= 2020–21 Pacific Tigers men's basketball team =

American college basketball season

2020–21 Pacific Tigers men's basketball
- Conference: West Coast Conference
- Record: 9–9 (6–7 WCC)
- Head coach: Damon Stoudamire (5th season)
- Assistant coaches: Leonard Perry; Luke Wicks; JayDee Luster
- Home arena: Alex G. Spanos Center

2020–21 West Coast Conference men's basketball standings
	Conf.				Overall
Team	W		L	PCT	W		L	PCT
No. 1 Gonzaga †	15	–	0	1.000	31	–	1	.969
No. 23 BYU	10	–	3	.769	20	–	7	.741
Loyola Marymount	7	–	5	.583	13	–	9	.591
Pepperdine	7	–	6	.538	15	–	12	.556
Pacific	6	–	7	.462	9	–	9	.500
Santa Clara	4	–	5	.444	12	–	8	.600
Saint Mary's	4	–	6	.400	14	–	10	.583
San Francisco	4	–	9	.308	11	–	14	.440
San Diego	2	–	7	.222	3	–	11	.214
Portland	0	–	11	.000	6	–	15	.286
† 2021 WCC tournament winner Rankings from AP poll

The 2020–21 Pacific Tigers men's basketball team represented the University of the Pacific during the 2020–21 NCAA Division I men's basketball season. The Tigers were led by fifth-year head coach Damon Stoudamire, and played their home games at the Alex G. Spanos Center in Stockton, California as members of the West Coast Conference.

== Previous season ==
The Tigers finished the 2019–20 season 23–10, 11–5 in WCC play to finish in a tie for third place. They lost in the third round of the WCC tournament to San Francisco.

== Offseason ==
=== Departures ===
Name	Number	Pos.	Height	Weight	Year	Hometown	Reason for departure
Jahlil Tripp	0	G	6'5"	220	Senior	Brooklyn, NY	Graduated/undrafted in 2020 NBA draft
Austin Vereen	1	G	6'4"	210	RS senior	Washington, D.C.	Graduated
Amari McCray	2	C	6'9"	265	Senior	Ruston, LA	Graduated
Jade Brahmbhatt	20	G	5'11"	167	Sophomore	Olney, MD	Transferred to Maryland
Shaquillo Fritz	35	F/C	6'8"	225	RS senior	Freeport, BAH	Graduated

=== Incoming transfers ===
Name	Number	Pos.	Height	Weight	Year	Hometown	Previous school
Marial Mading	0	F	6'11"	200	RS sophomore	Perth, Australia	Junior college, transferred from Chipola College
Jordan Bell	1	F	6'8"	221	RS senior	Inglewood, CA	Transferred from Loyola Marymount. was eligible to play immediately, since he graduated from Loyola Marymount.
Jalen Brown	2	G	6'3"	163	Sophomore	Vancouver, WA	Junior college, transferred from Eastern Arizona College
Jervay Green	12	G	6'4"	180	Senior	Denver, CO	Transferred from Nebraska. Was eligible to play immediately, since he graduated from Nebraska.
Nigel Shadd	45	F	6'9"	250	RS junior	Mesa, AZ	Transferred from Kansas State. Was granted a waiver for immediate eligibility. Had two years of remaining eligibility.

=== Recruiting class of 2020 ===
There was no recruiting class of 2020.

=== Recruiting class of 2021 ===
College recruiting
Name	Hometown	School	Height	Weight	Commit date
Jaden Byers; PG	Riverside, CA	Rancho Christian School	6 ft 5 in (1.96 m)	185 lb (84 kg)	Jul 18, 2020
Jaden Byers; PG	Recruit ratings: Scout: Rivals: (0)				
Jaden Phillips; SG	Bakersfield, CA	Modesto Christian School	6 ft 5 in (1.96 m)	187 lb (85 kg)	Nov 7, 2020
Jaden Phillips; SG	Recruit ratings: Scout: Rivals: (0)				
Overall recruit ranking: Scout: 98 Rivals: nr ESPN: nr
Note: In many cases, Scout, Rivals, 247Sports, On3, and ESPN may conflict in their listings of height and weight.; In these cases, the average was taken. ESPN grades are on a 100-point scale.; Sources: "Pacific 2021 Basketball Commitments". Rivals.; "2021 Pacific Basketball Commits". Scout.; "ESPN". ESPN.; "Scout.com Team Recruiting Rankings". Scout.; "2021 Team Ranking". Rivals.

== Roster ==
2020–21 Pacific Tigers men's basketball team
Players
Coaches

Pos.	#	Name	Height	Weight	Year	Previous school	Hometown
F	0	Marial Mading	6 ft 11 in (2.11 m)	200 lb (91 kg)	RS So	Abraham Lincoln; Chipola College	Perth, Australia
G	1	Jordan Bell	6 ft 8 in (2.03 m)	221 lb (100 kg)	Sr	Inglewood HS; Loyola Marymount	Inglewood, CA
G	2	Jalen Brown	6 ft 3 in (1.91 m)	170 lb (77 kg)	So	Jefferson HS; Eastern Arizona CC	Portland, OR
G	3	Pierre Crockrell II	6 ft 0 in (1.83 m)	175 lb (79 kg)	So	Prolific Prep	Tacoma, WA
G	4	Daniss Jenkins	6 ft 3 in (1.91 m)	165 lb (75 kg)	So	Hillcrest	Dallas, TX
F	10	Jonathan Salazar	6 ft 6 in (1.98 m)	250 lb (113 kg)	So	St. John Bosco	Panama
G	12	Jervay Green	6 ft 3 in (1.91 m)	200 lb (91 kg)	Sr	George Washington HS; Nebraska	Denver, CO
F	13	Jeremiah Bailey	6 ft 6 in (1.98 m)	220 lb (100 kg)	Sr	Monroe Catholic HS; Pima College	Fairbanks, AK
G	22	Jahbril Price-Noel	6 ft 7 in (2.01 m)	215 lb (98 kg)	Jr	Southwest Christian Academy	Scarborough, ON
G	24	Broc Finstuen	6 ft 4 in (1.93 m)	200 lb (91 kg)	Sr	Pine Island HS; Casper College	Pine Island, MN
G	25	Justin Moore	6 ft 4 in (1.93 m)	175 lb (79 kg)	RS Sr	Mission Bay HS; Georgia Tech	San Diego, CA
F	30	Takori Rooks (W)	6 ft 5 in (1.96 m)	215 lb (98 kg)	So	Bartlett HS	Memphis, TN
C	33	James Hampshire	7 ft 1 in (2.16 m)	242 lb (110 kg)	RS Sr	Coconino HS; Casper College	Flagstaff, AZ
F	45	Nigel Shadd	6 ft 9 in (2.06 m)	250 lb (113 kg)	RS Jr	Tri-City Christian Academy; Kansas State	Mesa, AZ

Head coach

- Damon Stoudamire (Arizona)

Assistant coach(es)

- Leonard Perry (Idaho)
- Luke Wicks (Northern State)
- JayDee Luster (Wyoming)

Legend

- (C) Team captain
- (S) Suspended
- (I) Ineligible
- (W) Walk-on
- Injured
- Current redshirt

Roster
Last update: November 19, 2020

== Schedule and results ==
Date time, TV	Rank^{#}	Opponent^{#}	Result	Record	High points	High rebounds	High assists	Site (attendance) city, state
Non-conference regular season
November 25, 2020*; 2:00 pm, WCC Network		UC Riverside	W 66–60	1–0	19 – Bailey	6 – Finstuen	2 – Crockrell II	Alex G. Spanos Center; Stockton, CA
November 27, 2020*; 6:00 pm, WCC Network		Fresno State	Canceled due to COVID-19 issues					Alex G. Spanos Center; Stockton, CA
November 30, 2020*; 7:00 pm, MW Network		at Nevada	L 58–70	1–1	19 – Jenkins	9 – Finstuen	3 – Tied	Lawlor Events Center; Reno, NV
December 2, 2020*; 2:00 pm, WCC Network		Montana State	W 74–70 ^{OT}	2–1	19 – Finstuen	10 – Bailey	2 – Tied	Alex G. Spanos Center; Stockton, CA
December 4, 2020*; 2:00 pm		Westmont	Postponed due to COVID-19 issues					Alex G. Spanos Center; Stockton, CA
December 6, 2020*; 3:00 pm		San Jose State	Canceled due to COVID-19 issues					Alex G. Spanos Center; Stockton, CA
December 12, 2020*; 3:00 pm		UC Davis	Canceled due to COVID-19 issues					Alex G. Spanos Center; Stockton, CA
December 16, 2020*; 4:00 pm		at Cal State Northridge	Postponed due to COVID-19 issues					Matadome; Northridge, CA
December 19, 2020*; 7:00 pm		at Cal State Fullerton	Canceled due to COVID-19 issues					Titan Gym; Fullerton, CA
December 20, 2020*; 5:00 pm		at Westmont rescheduled from December 4	W 92–64	3–1	16 – Finstuen	13 – Bailey	3 – Tied	Murchison Gymnasium; Santa Barbara, CA
December 21, 2020*; 2:00 pm		Saint Katherine	Canceled due to COVID-19 issues					Alex G. Spanos Center; Stockton, CA
December 22, 2020*; 3:00 pm		at Cal State Northridge rescheduled from December 16	Canceled due to COVID-19 issues					Matadome; Northridge, CA
December 29, 2020*; 3:00 pm		William Jessup	Canceled due to COVID-19 issues					Alex G. Spanos Center; Stockton, CA
WCC regular season
January 2, 2021; 2:00 pm, WCC Network		Portland	Postponed due to COVID-19 issues					Alex G. Spanos Center; Stockton, CA
January 7, 2020; 2:00 pm, WCC Network		at BYU	Postponed due to COVID-19 issues					Marriott Center; Provo, UT
January 9, 2020; WCC Network		San Diego	Postponed due to COVID-19 issues					Spanos Center; Stockton, CA
January 14, 2021; 2:00 pm		Santa Clara	W 79–58	4–1 (1–0)	17 – Bell	11 – Bell	5 – Crockrell II	Alex G. Spanos Center; Stockton, CA
January 16, 2021; 3:00 pm, NBCSBA		Loyola Marymount	W 58–49	5–1 (2–0)	18 – Jenkins	8 – Shadd	3 – Crockrell II	Alex G. Spanos Center; Stockton, CA
January 21, 2021; 6:00 pm, Stadium		at Pepperdine	L 68–85	5–2 (2–1)	19 – Crockrell II	7 – Bell	3 – Tied	Firestone Fieldhouse; Malibu, CA
January 23, 2021; 7:00 pm, RTNW		at No. 1 Gonzaga	L 49–95	5–3 (2–2)	17 – Jenkins	7 – Tied	2 – Green	McCarthey Athletic Center; Spokane, WA
January 28, 2021; 6:00 pm		at Santa Clara	Canceled due to COVID-19 issues					Kaiser Permanente Arena; Santa Cruz, CA
January 30, 2021; 4:00 pm		Saint Mary's	Canceled due to COVID-19 issues					Alex G. Spanos Center; Stockton, CA
January 30, 2021; 3:00 pm, CBSSN		at BYU rescheduled from January 7	L 87–95 ^{2OT}	5–4 (2–3)	18 – Moore	10 – Bell	4 – Moore	Marriott Center; Provo, UT
February 4, 2021*; 8:00 pm, ESPN2		San Francisco	Postponed due to COVID-19 issues					Alex G. Spanos Center; Stockton, CA
February 4, 2021; 8:00 pm, ESPN		No. 1 Gonzaga moved from February 25	L 58–76	5–5 (2–4)	13 – Jenkins	10 – Bell	6 – Crockrell II	Alex G. Spanos Center; Stockton, CA
February 6, 2021; 1:00 pm, WCC Network		at San Diego	Postponed due to COVID-19 issues					Jenny Craig Pavilion; San Diego, CA
February 11, 2021; 12:00 pm, WCC Network		San Diego rescheduled from January 8	Canceled due to COVID-19 issues					Spanos Center; Stockton, CA
February 11, 2021; 2:00 pm		Portland rescheduled from January 2	W 84–57	6–5 (3–4)	21 – Bailey	9 – Bell	8 – Crockrell II	Alex G. Spanos Center; Stockton, CA
February 13, 2021; 4:00 pm		at Loyola Marymount	L 76–80	6–6 (3–5)	28 – Bailey	5 – Bell	6 – Moore	Gersten Pavilion; Los Angeles, CA
February 18, 2021; 5:00 pm, CBSSN		BYU	L 52–80	6–7 (3–6)	12 – Finstuen	7 – Bell	4 – Tied	Alex G. Spanos Center; Stockton, CA
February 20, 2021; 1:00 pm, NBCSNW		at Portland	W 80–58	7–7 (4–6)	16 – Crockrell II	7 – Tied	7 – Crockrell II	Chiles Center; Portland, OR
February 23, 2021; 1:00 pm		at San Diego rescheduled from February 6	W 77–67	8–7 (5–6)	21 – Crockrell II	8 – Bell	5 – Crockrell II	Jenny Craig Pavilion; San Diego, CA
February 25, 2021; 8:00 pm, ESPN2		at Saint Mary's moved from February 27	L 46–58	8–8 (5–7)	12 – Jenkins	12 – Bell	3 – Crockrell II	University Credit Union Pavilion; Moraga, CA
February 27, 2021; 7:00 pm		San Francisco rescheduled from February 4	W 76–69	9–8 (6–7)	17 – Crockrell II	8 – Finstuen/Bell	8 – Crockrell II	Alex G. Spanos Center; Stockton, CA
WCC tournament
March 5, 2021; 9:00 pm, Stadium	(6)	vs. (7) Santa Clara; Second round	L 76–81	9–9	16 – Jenkins	9 – Bell	6 – Jenkins	Orleans Arena; Paradise, NV
*Non-conference game. ^{#}Rankings from AP Poll. (#) Tournament seedings in parentheses. All times are in Pacific Time.
