= 2020–21 San Diego Toreros men's basketball team =

American college basketball season

2020–21 San Diego Toreros men's basketball
- Conference: West Coast Conference
- Record: 3–11 (2–7 WCC)
- Head coach: Sam Scholl (3rd season)
- Assistant coaches: Martin Bahar; Jerry Brown; Lance Lavetter
- Home arena: Jenny Craig Pavilion

2020–21 West Coast Conference men's basketball standings
	Conf.				Overall
Team	W		L	PCT	W		L	PCT
No. 1 Gonzaga †	15	–	0	1.000	31	–	1	.969
No. 23 BYU	10	–	3	.769	20	–	7	.741
Loyola Marymount	7	–	5	.583	13	–	9	.591
Pepperdine	7	–	6	.538	15	–	12	.556
Pacific	6	–	7	.462	9	–	9	.500
Santa Clara	4	–	5	.444	12	–	8	.600
Saint Mary's	4	–	6	.400	14	–	10	.583
San Francisco	4	–	9	.308	11	–	14	.440
San Diego	2	–	7	.222	3	–	11	.214
Portland	0	–	11	.000	6	–	15	.286
† 2021 WCC tournament winner Rankings from AP poll

The 2020–21 San Diego Toreros men's basketball team represented the University of San Diego during the 2020–21 NCAA Division I men's basketball season. The Toreros were led by third-year head coach Sam Scholl. They played their home games at the Jenny Craig Pavilion in San Diego, California, as members of the West Coast Conference (WCC).

== Previous season ==
The Toreros finished the 2019–20 season 9–23, 2–14 in WCC play, to finish in 9th place. They lost in the first round of the WCC tournament to Loyola Marymount.

== Roster ==
2020–21 San Diego Toreros men's basketball team
Players
Coaches

Pos.	#	Name	Height	Weight	Year	Previous school	Hometown
G	0	Marion Humphrey	6 ft 2 in (1.88 m)	185 lb (84 kg)	RS So	Hoover HS	Hoover, AL
G	2	Joey Calcaterra	6 ft 3 in (1.91 m)	165 lb (75 kg)	RS Jr	Marin Catholic HS	Novato, CA
G	3	Frankie Hughes	6 ft 4 in (1.93 m)	195 lb (88 kg)	RS Jr	Garfield Heights HS; Duquesne	Cleveland, OH
F	4	Josh Parrish	6 ft 4 in (1.93 m)	215 lb (98 kg)	RS Sr	Seguin HS; Rice	Arlington, TX
G	5	Finn Sullivan	6 ft 4 in (1.93 m)	175 lb (79 kg)	Jr	Torrey Pines HS	San Diego, CA
F	10	Mikal Gjerde	6 ft 7 in (2.01 m)	200 lb (91 kg)	So	Woodstock Academy	Haugesund, Norway
F	11	Yavuz Gultekin	6 ft 7 in (2.01 m)	200 lb (91 kg)	So	Bishop Walsh HS; Texas A&M	Karşıyaka, Turkey
C	15	Vladimir Pinchuk	6 ft 11 in (2.11 m)	230 lb (104 kg)	RS Jr	Maerkischies Gymnasium; New Mexico	Schwelm, Germany
F	20	Jared Rodriguez	6 ft 7 in (2.01 m)	205 lb (93 kg)	RS Jr	Mountain Ridge HS; Idaho	Glendale, AZ
G	22	Scotty Prunty	5 ft 11 in (1.8 m)	165 lb (75 kg)	Fr	Cathedral Catholic HS	San Diego, CA
G	24	Chris Jr. Herren	6 ft 3 in (1.91 m)	175 lb (79 kg)	Jr	Tabor Academy; Boston College	Portsmouth, RI
F	25	Yauhen Massalski	6 ft 10 in (2.08 m)	245 lb (111 kg)	Sr	Gymnasium No. 15	Minsk, Belarus
G	31	Jason Gallant	6 ft 2 in (1.88 m)	180 lb (82 kg)	RS Fr	Saint Francis HS	La Cañada, CA
F	33	Ben Pyle	6 ft 7 in (2.01 m)	185 lb (84 kg)	Jr	McPherson HS	McPherson, KS
F	40	Jack Vaske	6 ft 10 in (2.08 m)	195 lb (88 kg)	Fr	St. Andrew's School	New Canaan, CT

Head coach

- Sam Scholl (San Diego)

Assistant coach(es)

- Jerry Brown (Fresno State)
- Martin Bahar (Vanderbilt)
- Lance Lavetter (Northern Arizona)

Legend

- (C) Team captain
- (S) Suspended
- (I) Ineligible
- (W) Walk-on
- Injured
- Current redshirt

Roster
Last update: July 14, 2024

== Schedule and results ==
On November 20, San Diego paused all activities for 14 days following COVID-19-positive tests, cancelling scheduled games during that time.

Date time, TV	Rank^{#}	Opponent^{#}	Result	Record	High points	High rebounds	High assists	Site (attendance) city, state
Non-conference regular season
December 9, 2020*; 6:00 p.m., P12N		at UCLA	L 56–83	0–1	18 – Calcaterra	14 – Massalski	3 – tied	Pauley Pavilion (0); Los Angeles, CA
December 11, 2020; 6:00 p.m.		Cal State Fullerton	Canceled due to COVID-19 issues					Jenny Craig Pavilion; San Diego, CA
December 14, 2020*; 6:00 p.m., WCC Network		Nevada	L 72–79	0–2	22 – Hughes	6 – tied	4 – Pyle	Jenny Craig Pavilion (0); San Diego, CA
December 16, 2020*; 3:00 p.m., BigWest.TV		at Cal Poly	W 70–61	1–2	18 – Calcaterra	11 – Massalski	4 – tied	Robert A. Mott Athletics Center (0); San Luis Obispo, CA
December 19, 2020*; 4:00 p.m., BigWest.TV		at UC Irvine	L 53–85	1–3	14 – Calcaterra	4 – Calcaterra	2 – tied	Bren Events Center (0); Irvine, CA
December 21, 2020*; 2:00 p.m., P12N		at Arizona	Canceled due to COVID-19 issues					McKale Center; Tucson, AZ
December 22, 2020*; WCC Network		Long Beach State	Canceled due to COVID-19 issues					Jenny Craig Pavilion; San Diego, CA
December 23, 2020; WCC Network		Cal State Fullerton	Canceled due to COVID-19 issues					Jenny Craig Pavilion; San Diego, CA
WCC regular season
December 31, 2020; 2:00 p.m., WCC Network		at San Francisco	L 62–70	1–4 (0–1)	15 – Parrish	8 – Parrish	3 – Sullivan	War Memorial Gymnasium (0); San Francisco, CA
January 2, 2020; 2:00 p.m., WCC Network		BYU	Postponed due to COVID-19 issues					Jenny Craig Pavilion; San Diego, CA
January 7, 2020; 4:00 p.m., WCC Network		Saint Mary's	Postponed due to COVID-19 issues					Jenny Craig Pavilion; San Diego, CA
January 9, 2020; WCC Network		at Pacific	Postponed due to COVID-19 issues					Spanos Center; Stockton, CA
January 14, 2020; 6:00 p.m., WCC Network		at Loyola Marymount	Postponed due to COVID-19 issues					Gersten Pavilion; Los Angeles, CA
January 16, 2020; 2:00 p.m., WCC Network		Santa Clara	Postponed due to COVID-19 issues					Jenny Craig Pavilion; San Diego, CA
January 17, 2021; 2:00 p.m., WCC Network		Santa Clara; Rescheduled from January 16	L 63–69	1–5 (0–2)	19 – Pinchuk	11 – Pinchuk	3 – Sullivan	Jenny Craig Pavilion (0); San Diego, CA
January 19, 2021; 6:00 p.m., NBC Sports CA		at Loyola Marymount; Rescheduled from January 14	L 69–72 ^{OT}	1–6 (0–3)	13 – tied	10 – Pinchuk	5 – Pyle	Gersten Pavilion (0); Los Angeles, CA
January 23, 2021; 2:00 p.m., NBCSNW		at Portland	W 78–70	2–6 (1–3)	20 – Parrish	8 – Parrish	5 – Sullivan	Chiles Center (0); Portland, OR
January 28, 2021; 6:00 p.m., RTNW		No. 1 Gonzaga	L 62–90	2–7 (1–4)	16 – Sullivan	5 – tied	6 – Sullivan	Jenny Craig Pavilion (0); San Diego, CA
January 30, 2021; 2:00 p.m., WCC Network		Loyola Marymount	Canceled due to COVID-19 issues					Jenny Craig Pavilion; San Diego, CA
February 2, 2021; 6:00 p.m., WCC Network		BYU; Rescheduled from January 2	Canceled due to COVID-19 issues					Jenny Craig Pavilion; San Diego, CA
February 4, 2021; 6:00 p.m., WCC Network		at Pepperdine	Canceled due to COVID-19 issues					Firestone Fieldhouse; Malibu, CA
February 6, 2021; 1:00 p.m., WCC Network		Pacific	Postponed due to COVID-19 issues					Jenny Craig Pavilion; San Diego, CA
February 8, 2021; 6:00 p.m., WCC Network		Saint Mary's; Rescheduled from January 7	Canceled due to COVID-19 issues					Jenny Craig Pavilion; San Diego, CA
February 11, 2021; 12:00 p.m., WCC Network		at Pacific; Rescheduled from January 9	Canceled due to COVID-19 issues					Spanos Center; Stockton, CA
February 13, 2021; 6:00 p.m., WCC Network		at BYU	Canceled due to COVID-19 issues					Marriott Center; Provo, UT
February 18, 2021; 6:00 p.m., WCC Network		at Santa Clara	W 71–60	3–7 (2–4)	23 – Calcaterra	10 – tied	5 – Parrish	Leavey Center (0); Santa Clara, CA
February 20, 2021; 5:00 p.m., ESPN2		at No. 1 Gonzaga	L 69–106	3–8 (2–5)	13 – Parrish	7 – Massalski	3 – tied	McCarthey Athletic Center (200); Spokane, WA
February 23, 2021; 12:00 p.m., WCC Network		Pacific; Rescheduled from February 6	L 67–77	3–9 (2–6)	12 – Calcaterra	11 – Massalski	3 – Sullivan	Jenny Craig Pavilion (0); San Diego, CA
February 25, 2021; 6:00 p.m.		Portland	Canceled due to COVID-19 issues					Jenny Craig Pavilion; San Diego, CA
February 27, 2021; 1:00 p.m.		Pepperdine	L 84–90	3–10 (2–7)	30 – Massalski	5 – 2 tied	4 – 3 tied	Jenny Craig Pavilion (0); San Diego, CA
WCC tournament
March 4, 2021; 6:00 p.m., Stadium	(9)	vs. (8) San Francisco; First round	L 51–67	3–11	12 – Sullivan	11 – Massalski	4 – Sullivan	Orleans Arena; Paradise, NV
*Non-conference game. ^{#}Rankings from AP poll. (#) Tournament seedings in parentheses. All times are in Pacific.
