= 2020–21 UC Santa Barbara Gauchos men's basketball team =

American college basketball season

2020–21 UC Santa Barbara Gauchos men's basketball

Big West regular season and tournament champions

NCAA tournament, first round
- Conference: Big West Conference
- Record: 22–5 (13–3 Big West)
- Head coach: Joe Pasternack (4th season)
- Associate head coach: John Rillie
- Assistant coaches: Larry Lewis; Ben Tucker
- Home arena: The Thunderdome

2020–21 Big West men's basketball standings
	Conf.				Overall
Team	W		L	PCT	W		L	PCT
UC Santa Barbara †	13	–	3	.813	22	–	5	.815
UC Irvine	10	–	4	.714	18	–	9	.667
UC Riverside	8	–	4	.667	14	–	8	.636
UC Davis	6	–	4	.600	10	–	8	.556
Cal State Bakersfield	9	–	7	.563	15	–	11	.577
Hawai'i	9	–	9	.500	11	–	10	.524
Cal State Fullerton	5	–	7	.417	6	–	10	.375
Cal State Northridge	5	–	9	.357	9	–	13	.409
Long Beach State	4	–	8	.333	6	–	12	.333
Cal Poly	1	–	15	.063	4	–	20	.167
UC San Diego*	0	–	0	–	7	–	10	.412
† 2021 Big West tournament winner * ineligible for the 2021 NCAA tournament and 2021 Big West tournament due to transition period; Big West games not counted in standings

The 2020–21 UC Santa Barbara Gauchos men's basketball team represented the University of California, Santa Barbara in the 2020–21 NCAA Division I men's basketball season. The Gauchos, led by fourth-year head coach Joe Pasternack, play their home games at The Thunderdome in Santa Barbara, California as members of the Big West Conference. They finished the season 22–5, 13–3 in Big West Play to finish as regular season champions. They defeated Long Beach State, UC Davis, and UC Irvine to be champions of the Big West tournament. They received the Big West’s automatic bid to the NCAA tournament where they lost in the first round to Creighton.

== Previous season ==
The Gauchos finished the 2019–20 season 21–10, 10–6 in Big West play to finish in a tie for second place. They were scheduled to play UC Riverside in the quarterfinals of the Big West tournament, however, the tournament was canceled due to the ongoing COVID-19 pandemic.

== Roster ==
2020–21 UC Santa Barbara Gauchos men's basketball team
Players
Coaches

Pos.	#	Name	Height	Weight	Year	Previous school	Hometown
G	0	Sékou Touré	6 ft 5 in (1.96 m)	185 lb (84 kg)	Jr	Prolific Prep Academy	Conakry, Guinea
F	1	Jay Nagle	6 ft 8 in (2.03 m)	215 lb (98 kg)	Jr	Will C. Wood High School	Vacaville, California
G	2	Josh Pierre-Louis	6 ft 4 in (1.93 m)	185 lb (84 kg)	So	Temple	Plainfield, New Jersey
G	3	JaQuori McLaughlin	6 ft 4 in (1.93 m)	190 lb (86 kg)	Sr	Oregon State	Tacoma, Washington
G	4	Devearl Ramsey	6 ft 0 in (1.83 m)	185 lb (84 kg)	Sr	Nevada	Los Angeles, California
F	5	Miles Norris	6 ft 10 in (2.08 m)	220 lb (100 kg)	Jr	City College of San Francisco	San Diego, California
G	11	Brandon Cyrus	6 ft 5 in (1.96 m)	190 lb (86 kg)	GS	DePaul	Oakville, Ontario
F	12	Amadou Sow	6 ft 9 in (2.06 m)	235 lb (107 kg)	Jr	Prolific Prep Academy	Bamako, Mali
G	13	Ajare Sanni	6 ft 3 in (1.91 m)	170 lb (77 kg)	RS So	Pacific	Houston, Texas
F	14	Jakov Kukic	6 ft 10 in (2.08 m)	230 lb (104 kg)	Fr	La Lumiere School	Split, Croatia
G	15	Max Cheylov	6 ft 3 in (1.91 m)	175 lb (79 kg)	RS Fr	Calabasas High School	Toronto, Canada
F	23	Destin Barnes	6 ft 7 in (2.01 m)	215 lb (98 kg)	GS	Jacksonville	Chicago, Illinois
F	24	Robinson Idehen	6 ft 10 in (2.08 m)	230 lb (104 kg)	Sr	Trinity Valley Community College	Tudela, Navarre, Spain
G	50	Gage Gomez	6 ft 3 in (1.91 m)	190 lb (86 kg)	Fr	Arroyo Grande High School	Arroyo Grande, California
G	52	Kyle MacLean	6 ft 2 in (1.88 m)	190 lb (86 kg)	Fr	Westlake High School	Westlake, California
F	54	Niko Rocak	6 ft 9 in (2.06 m)	220 lb (100 kg)	Fr	Phillips Exeter Academy	Geneva, Switzerland
G		Calvin Wishart (redshirt)	6 ft 2 in (1.88 m)	185 lb (84 kg)	Jr	Georgia Southern	Delano, Minnesota

Head coach

- Joe Pasternack (Indiana)

Assistant coach(es)

- John Rillie (Gonzaga)
- Larry Lewis (Morehouse)
- Ben Tucker (Arizona)

Legend

- (C) Team captain
- (S) Suspended
- (I) Ineligible
- (W) Walk-on
- Injured
- Current redshirt

Roster
Last update: December 26, 2020

== Schedule and results ==
Date time, TV	Rank^{#}	Opponent^{#}	Result	Record	Site (attendance) city, state
Non-conference regular season
November 29, 2020*; 4:00 pm		St. Katherine	W 92–55	1–0	The Thunderdome; Santa Barbara, CA
December 3, 2020*; 4:00 pm		Bethesda	W 123–52	2–0	The Thunderdome; Santa Barbara, CA
December 7, 2020*; 5:00 pm, BigWest.tv		Loyola Marymount	W 69–58	3–0	The Thunderdome; Santa Barbara, CA
December 12, 2020*; 2:00 pm		at Loyola Marymount	L 78–81	3–1	Gersten Pavilion; Los Angeles, CA
December 19, 2020*; 3:00 pm		at Pepperdine	W 75–63	4–1	Firestone Fieldhouse; Malibu, CA
Big West regular season
December 27, 2020; 4:00 pm, ESPN3		at UC Irvine	L 56–75	4–2 (0–1)	Bren Events Center; Irvine, CA
December 28, 2020; 4:00 pm, ESPN3		at UC Irvine	L 69–73	4–3 (0–2)	Bren Events Center; Irvine, CA
January 1, 2021; 5:00 pm, ESPN3		Cal State Fullerton	W 81–63	5–3 (1–2)	The Thunderdome; Santa Barbara, CA
January 2, 2021; 5:00 pm, ESPN3		Cal State Fullerton	W 65–61	6–3 (2–2)	The Thunderdome; Santa Barbara, CA
January 15, 2021; 5:00 pm, ESPN3		UC San Diego	W 69–52	7–3	The Thunderdome; Santa Barbara, CA
January 16, 2020; 5:00 pm, ESPN3		UC San Diego	W 84–53	8–3	The Thunderdome; Santa Barbara, CA
January 22, 2021; 4:00 pm		at Cal State Northridge	W 105–58	9–3 (3–2)	Matadome; Northridge, CA
January 23, 2021; 4:00 pm		at Cal State Northridge	W 80–66	10–3 (4–2)	Matadome; Northridge, CA
January 29, 2021; 4:00 pm		at UC Davis	W 72–51	11–3 (5–2)	The Pavilion; Davis, CA
January 30, 2021; 4:00 pm		at UC Davis	W 89–86 ^{OT}	12–3 (6–2)	The Pavilion; Davis, CA
February 5, 2021; 5:00 pm, ESPN3		Long Beach State	Postponed due to COVID-19 issues.		The Thunderdome; Santa Barbara, CA
February 6, 2021; 5:00 pm, ESPN3		Long Beach State	Postponed due to COVID-19 issues.		The Thunderdome; Santa Barbara, CA
February 12, 2021; 9:00 pm, Spectrum Sports		at Hawaii	W 59–50	13–3 (7–2)	Stan Sheriff Center (0); Honolulu, HI
February 13, 2021; 7:00 pm, Spectrum Sports		at Hawaii	W 81–74 ^{OT}	14–3 (8–2)	Stan Sheriff Center (0); Honolulu, HI
February 19, 2021; 8:00 pm, ESPN3		Cal State Bakersfield	W 71–66	15–3 (9–2)	The Thunderdome (0); Santa Barbara, CA
February 20, 2021; 7:00 pm, ESPN3		Cal State Bakersfield	W 63–44	16–3 (10–2)	The Thunderdome (0); Santa Barbara, CA
February 26, 2021; 4:00 pm, ESPN2		at UC Riverside	W 72–68	17–3 (11–2)	SRC Arena (0); Riverside, CA
February 27, 2021; 4:00 pm, ESPN3		at UC Riverside	L 52–68	17–4 (11–3)	SRC Arena (0); Riverside, CA
March 5, 2021; 5:00 pm, ESPN3		Cal Poly; Rivalry	W 71–57	18–4 (12–3)	The Thunderdome; Santa Barbara, CA
March 6, 2021; 5:00 pm, ESPN3		Cal Poly; Rivalry	W 70–54	19–4 (13–3)	The Thunderdome; Santa Barbara, CA
Big West tournament
March 11, 2021; 11:00 am, ESPN3	(1)	vs. (9) Long Beach State; Quarterfinals	W 95–87	20–4	Mandalay Bay Events Center (3); Las Vegas, NV
March 12, 2021; 6:00 pm, ESPN3	(1)	vs. (4) UC Davis; Semifinals	W 71–55	21–4	Mandalay Bay Events Center; Las Vegas, NV
March 13, 2021; 8:30 pm, ESPN2	(1)	vs. (2) UC Irvine; Championship	W 79–63	22–4	Mandalay Bay Events Center; Las Vegas, NV
NCAA tournament
March 20, 2021; 12:30 pm, truTV	(12 W)	vs. (5 W) No. 19 Creighton; First Round	L 62–63	22–5	Lucas Oil Stadium; Indianapolis, IN
*Non-conference game. ^{#}Rankings from AP Poll. (#) Tournament seedings in parentheses. W=West. All times are in Pacific.
