= 2020–21 Cal State Bakersfield Roadrunners men's basketball team =

American college basketball season

2020–21 Cal State Bakersfield Roadrunners men's basketball
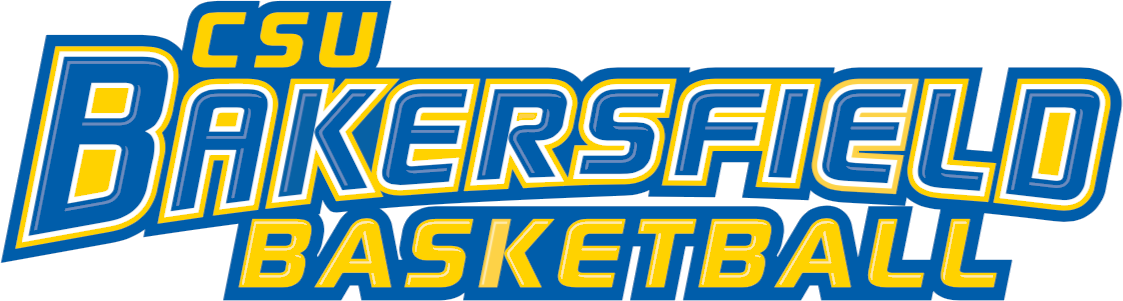
- Conference: Big West Conference
- Record: 15–11 (9–7 Big West)
- Head coach: Rod Barnes (10th season)
- Assistant coaches: Mike Scott (4th season); Brandon Barnes (2nd season); Chris Crevelone (1st season)
- Home arena: Icardo Center

2020–21 Big West men's basketball standings
	Conf.				Overall
Team	W		L	PCT	W		L	PCT
UC Santa Barbara †	13	–	3	.813	22	–	5	.815
UC Irvine	10	–	4	.714	18	–	9	.667
UC Riverside	8	–	4	.667	14	–	8	.636
UC Davis	6	–	4	.600	10	–	8	.556
Cal State Bakersfield	9	–	7	.563	15	–	11	.577
Hawai'i	9	–	9	.500	11	–	10	.524
Cal State Fullerton	5	–	7	.417	6	–	10	.375
Cal State Northridge	5	–	9	.357	9	–	13	.409
Long Beach State	4	–	8	.333	6	–	12	.333
Cal Poly	1	–	15	.063	4	–	20	.167
UC San Diego*	0	–	0	–	7	–	10	.412
† 2021 Big West tournament winner * ineligible for the 2021 NCAA tournament and 2021 Big West tournament due to transition period; Big West games not counted in standings

The 2020–21 Cal State Bakersfield Roadrunners men's basketball team represented California State University, Bakersfield during the 2020–21 NCAA Division I men's basketball season. The team was led by tenth-year head coach Rod Barnes, and played their home games at Icardo Center in Bakersfield, California as a first-year member of the Big West Conference.

== Previous season ==
The Roadrunners finished the season 12–19, 6–10 in WAC play to finish in seventh place. They were set to be the No. 7 seed in the WAC tournament, however, the tournament was cancelled amid the COVID-19 pandemic.

2019–20 was the final year in the WAC for the Roadrunners, as they joined the Big West Conference on July 1, 2020.

== Roster ==
2020–21 Cal State Bakersfield Roadrunners men's basketball team
Players
Coaches

Pos.	#	Name	Height	Weight	Year	Hometown
C	0	Ronne Readus	6 ft 9 in (2.06 m)	240 lb (109 kg)	Sr	San Diego, CA
G	1	Travis Williams	6 ft 3 in (1.91 m)	175 lb (79 kg)	RS So	St. Louis, MO
F	2	Shaun Henson	6 ft 6 in (1.98 m)	195 lb (88 kg)	Jr	Oxon Hill, MD
G	3	Cameron Smith	6 ft 7 in (2.01 m)	205 lb (93 kg)	Jr	Okolona, MS
F	4	Tazé Moore	6 ft 5 in (1.96 m)	185 lb (84 kg)	RS Sr	Southaven, MS
G	5	Czar Perry	6 ft 2 in (1.88 m)	190 lb (86 kg)	Sr	El Dorado, AR
G/F	10	Justin Edler-Davis	6 ft 4 in (1.93 m)	220 lb (100 kg)	RS Sr	San Diego, CA
F	11	Jack Schoemann	6 ft 7 in (2.01 m)	200 lb (91 kg)	Jr	Prairie Village, KS
G	13	De'Monte Buckingham	6 ft 4 in (1.93 m)	220 lb (100 kg)	RS Sr	Richmond, VA
G	21	Jahveon Madearis	6 ft 2 in (1.88 m)	160 lb (73 kg)	Fr	Downey, CA
G/F	22	Justin McCall	6 ft 6 in (1.98 m)	210 lb (95 kg)	Sr	Bakersfield, CA
C	24	Ray Somerville	6 ft 10 in (2.08 m)	230 lb (104 kg)	RS Fr	Media, PA
F	32	Shawn Stith	6 ft 8 in (2.03 m)	265 lb (120 kg)	Sr	East Oakland, CA
G	55	Grehlon Easter	6 ft 3 in (1.91 m)	180 lb (82 kg)	Jr	Little Rock, AR

Head coach

- Rod Barnes (Ole Miss)

Assistant coach(es)

- Mike Scott (Fairleigh Dickinson)
- Brandon Barnes (Cal State Bakersfield)
- Chris Crevelone (Adams State)

Legend

- (C) Team captain
- (S) Suspended
- (I) Ineligible
- (W) Walk-on
- Injured
- Current redshirt

Roster
Last update: January 27, 2021

== Schedule and results ==
Date time, TV	Rank^{#}	Opponent^{#}	Result	Record	Site (attendance) city, state
Non-conference regular season
December 2, 2020*; 7:30 p.m.		at Santa Clara	L 47–53	0–1	Leavey Center; Santa Clara, CA
December 7, 2020*; 4:00 p.m., ESPN3		Bethesda	W 94–43	1–1	Icardo Center; Bakersfield, CA
December 9, 2020*; 4:00 p.m., P12N		at Arizona	L 60–85	1–2	McKale Center; Tucson, AZ
December 12, 2020*; 1:00 p.m., ESPN3		Idaho	W 76–66	2–2	Icardo Center; Bakersfield, CA
December 19, 2020*; 1:00 p.m., ESPN3		Life Pacific	Canceled due to scheduling issue		Icardo Center; Bakersfield, CA
December 19, 2020*; 4:00 p.m.		St. Katherine	W 87–46	3–2	Icardo Center; Bakersfield, CA
December 21, 2020*; 6:00 p.m.		vs. Stanford	L 50–63	3–3	Kaiser Permanente Arena (30); Santa Cruz, CA
December 23, 2020*; 3:00 p.m.		Pepperdine	W 79–51	4–3	Firestone Fieldhouse; Malibu, CA
Big West regular season
December 27, 2020; 4:00 p.m., ESPN3		UC Davis	Canceled due to COVID-19 restrictions		Icardo Center; Bakersfield, CA
December 28, 2020; 4:00 p.m., ESPN3		UC Davis	Canceled due to COVID-19 restrictions		Icardo Center; Bakersfield, CA
January 1, 2021; 4:00 p.m., BigWest.tv		at Long Beach State	L 89–90 ^{OT}	4–4 (0–1)	Walter Pyramid; Long Beach, CA
January 2, 2021; 4:00 p.m., BigWest.tv		at Long Beach State	W 89–76	5–4 (1–1)	Walter Pyramid; Long Beach, CA
January 8, 2021; 7:00 p.m., ESPN3		Cal Poly	W 62–49	6–4 (2–1)	Icardo Center; Bakersfield, CA
January 9, 2021; 7:00 p.m., ESPN3		Cal Poly	W 65–50	7–4 (3–1)	Icardo Center; Bakersfield, CA
January 15, 2021; 9:00 p.m.		at Hawaii	W 60–55	8–4 (4–1)	Stan Sheriff Center; Honolulu, HI
January 16, 2021; 9:00 p.m.		at Hawaii	W 83–72	9–4 (5–1)	Stan Sheriff Center; Honolulu, HI
January 22, 2021; 4:00 p.m.		at UC Riverside	W 47–45	10–4 (6–1)	Student Recreation Center Arena; Riverside, CA
January 23, 2021; 4:00 p.m.		at UC Riverside	L 63–70	10–5 (6–2)	Student Recreation Center Arena; Riverside, CA
January 29, 2021; 8:00 p.m., ESPNU		Cal State Fullerton	L 84–90	10–6 (6–3)	Icardo Center; Bakersfield, CA
January 30, 2021; 7:00 p.m., ESPN3		Cal State Fullerton	W 83–73	11–6 (7–3)	Icardo Center; Bakersfield, CA
February 5, 2021; 4:00 p.m., ESPN3		at UC Irvine	L 53–70	11–7 (7–4)	Bren Events Center; Irvine, CA
February 6, 2021; 7:00 p.m., ESPNU		at UC Irvine	W 62–57	12–7 (8–4)	Bren Events Center; Irvine, CA
February 12, 2021; 4:00 p.m., ESPN3		UC San Diego	W 76–71	13–7	Icardo Center; Bakersfield, CA
February 13, 2021; 4:00 p.m., ESPN3		UC San Diego	W 65–50	14–7	Icardo Center; Bakersfield, CA
February 19, 2021; 8:00 p.m., ESPNU		at UC Santa Barbara	L 66–71	14–8 (8–5)	UC Santa Barbara Events Center; Santa Barbara, CA
February 20, 2021; 7:00 p.m., ESPN3		at UC Santa Barbara	L 44–63	14–9 (8–6)	UC Santa Barbara Events Center; Santa Barbara, CA
February 26, 2021; 7:00 p.m., ESPN3		Cal State Northridge	W 84–58	15–9 (9–6)	Icardo Center; Bakersfield, CA
February 27, 2021; 7:00 p.m., ESPN3		Cal State Northridge	L 87–90	15–10 (9–7)	Icardo Center; Bakersfield, CA
Big West tournament
March 11, 2021; 2:00 pm, ESPN3	(5)	vs. (4) UC Davis; Quarterfinals	L 56–58	15–11	Michelob Ultra Arena (10); Paradise, NV
*Non-conference game. ^{#}Rankings from AP Poll. (#) Tournament seedings in parentheses. All times are in Pacific Time.
