= Ron Artest III =

American basketball player (born 1999)

Personal information
- Born: April 30, 1999 (age 27) New York City, U.S.
- Listed height: 6 ft 7 in (2.01 m)
- Listed weight: 215 lb (98 kg)

Career information
- High school: Palisades (Los Angeles, California); Beverly Hills (Beverly Hills, California)
- College: Cal State Northridge (2018–2021)
- Playing career: 2021–2022
- Position: Power forward

Career history
- 2022: Delaware Blue Coats
- 2022: Newfoundland Rogues
- 2022: KW Titans

Ronald William Artest III (born April 30, 1999) is an American former professional basketball player. He played college basketball for the Cal State Northridge Matadors and is the son of former NBA All-Star Metta Sandiford-Artest.

== High school career ==
Artest played basketball for two seasons at Palisades High School in Pacific Palisades, California. He led his team in rebounding during his sophomore season. He transferred to Beverly Hills High School following his sophomore season.

=== Recruiting ===
Artest was considered a two-star recruit by ESPN.

== College career ==
Artest verbally committed to California State University, Northridge on September 3, 2018. During the 2018–19 season, Artest played in 16 games with no starts, averaging 2.4 points, 2.1 rebounds, and 0.2 assists per game. During the 2019–20 season, he played in 12 games with five starts, averaging 2.1 points, 3.3 rebounds, and 0.5 assists.

Artest's best season in college came during the 2020–21 season, where he played in six games with four starts and averaged 4.3 points, 3.5 rebounds, and 1.3 assists. Following his third college season, he declared for the 2021 NBA G League draft.

== Professional career ==
After going undrafted in the 2021 NBA G League draft, Artest signed with the Sioux Falls Skyforce on October 26, 2021. However, he was waived on November 4.

On January 9, 2022, Artest signed with the Delaware Blue Coats. He was then later waived on January 31, 2022.

On March 9, 2022, Artest signed with the KW Titans of the National Basketball League of Canada, and made his debut in a losing effort to the London Lightning.

Artest joined the Miami Heat for training camp in 2023, but was cut on June 15, 2023.

== Career statistics ==
=== College ===
Year	Team	GP	GS	MPG	FG%	3P%	FT%	RPG	APG	SPG	BPG	PPG
2018–19	CSUN	16	0	12.4	.548	–	.286	2.1	.2	.2	.6	2.4
2019–20	CSUN	12	5	13.7	.367	–	.300	3.3	.5	.3	.7	2.1
2020–21	CSUN	6	4	17.8	.314	–	.500	3.5	1.3	.2	.7	4.3
Career		34	9	13.8	.406	–	.344	2.8	.5	.2	.6	2.6
