= 2020–21 Cal State Northridge Matadors men's basketball team =

American college basketball season

2020–21 Cal State Northridge Matadors men's basketball
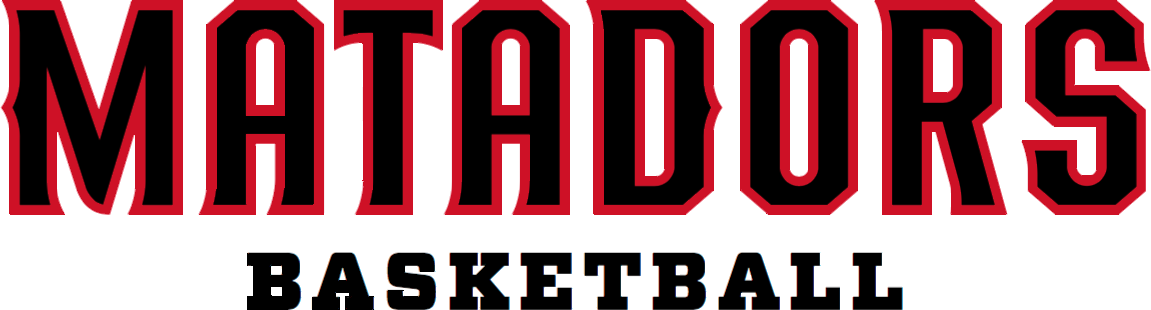
- Conference: Big West Conference
- Record: 9–13 (5–9 Big West)
- Head coach: Mark Gottfried (3rd season)
- Assistant coaches: Jim Harrick (3rd season); Jeff Dunlap (3rd season)
- Home arena: Matadome

2020–21 Big West men's basketball standings
	Conf.				Overall
Team	W		L	PCT	W		L	PCT
UC Santa Barbara †	13	–	3	.813	22	–	5	.815
UC Irvine	10	–	4	.714	18	–	9	.667
UC Riverside	8	–	4	.667	14	–	8	.636
UC Davis	6	–	4	.600	10	–	8	.556
Cal State Bakersfield	9	–	7	.563	15	–	11	.577
Hawai'i	9	–	9	.500	11	–	10	.524
Cal State Fullerton	5	–	7	.417	6	–	10	.375
Cal State Northridge	5	–	9	.357	9	–	13	.409
Long Beach State	4	–	8	.333	6	–	12	.333
Cal Poly	1	–	15	.063	4	–	20	.167
UC San Diego*	0	–	0	–	7	–	10	.412
† 2021 Big West tournament winner * ineligible for the 2021 NCAA tournament and 2021 Big West tournament due to transition period; Big West games not counted in standings

The 2020–21 Cal State Northridge Matadors men's basketball team represented California State University, Northridge in the 2020–21 NCAA Division I men's basketball season. The Matadors, led by third-year head coach Mark Gottfried, played their home games at the Matadome in Northridge, California as members of the Big West Conference.

== Previous season ==
The Matadors finished the 2019–20 season 15–17, 10–6 in Big West play to finish in a tie for second place. They were set to be the No. 2 seed in the Big West tournament, and face Cal State Fullerton, however, the tournament was cancelled amid the COVID-19 pandemic.

== Roster ==
2020–21 Cal State Northridge Matadors men's basketball team
Players
Coaches

Pos.	#	Name	Height	Weight	Year	Previous school	Hometown
F	0	Festus Ndumanya	6 ft 7 in (2.01 m)	220 lb (100 kg)	So	Capistrano Valley Christian School	Anambra, Nigeria
F	1	Lance Coleman II	6 ft 6 in (1.98 m)	205 lb (93 kg)	RS Sr	Fullerton College	Antioch, California
G	2	TJ Starks	6 ft 2 in (1.88 m)	196 lb (89 kg)	RS Jr	Texas A&M	Oak Cliff, Texas
G	3	Kailen Rains	6 ft 6 in (1.98 m)	195 lb (88 kg)	Fr	San Ysidro High School	San Diego, California
G	4	Atin Wright	6 ft 1 in (1.85 m)	160 lb (73 kg)	Fr	Fairmont Prep	Lakewood, California
F	5	Miles Brookins	6 ft 9 in (2.06 m)	220 lb (100 kg)	RS Jr	La Salle	Cypress, California
G	10	Darius Brown II	6 ft 2 in (1.88 m)	195 lb (88 kg)	Jr	Pasadena High School	Pasadena, California
G	11	Amound Anderson	6 ft 3 in (1.91 m)	185 lb (84 kg)	Fr	Leuzinger High School	Hawthorne, California
G	12	Marcel Stevens	6 ft 2 in (1.88 m)	175 lb (79 kg)	Fr	Impact Basketball Academy	Beverly Hills, California
G	13	Matt Solomon	6 ft 2 in (1.88 m)	185 lb (84 kg)	Fr	Newbury Park High School	Newbury Park, California
G	14	Vante Hendrix	6 ft 5 in (1.96 m)	195 lb (88 kg)	RS Jr	New Mexico	Woodland Hills, California
F	15	Ron Artest III	6 ft 7 in (2.01 m)	215 lb (98 kg)	Jr	Hillcrest Prep (AZ)	New York, New York
F	22	George Nwogu	6 ft 8 in (2.03 m)	210 lb (95 kg)	So	Lafitte Prep Academy	Baton Rouge, Louisiana
F	23	Alex Merkviladze	6 ft 9 in (2.06 m)	225 lb (102 kg)	Fr	Modesto Christian School	Kutaisi, Georgia
F	24	Fidelis Okereke	6 ft 6 in (1.98 m)	240 lb (109 kg)	Fr	King/Drew High School	Carson, California
G/F	32	Brendan Harrick	6 ft 5 in (1.96 m)	190 lb (86 kg)	RS So	Esperanza High School	Anaheim, California

Head coach

- Mark Gottfried (Alabama)

Assistant coach(es)

- Jim Harrick (Charleston (WV))
- Jeff Dunlap (UCLA)

Legend

- (C) Team captain
- (S) Suspended
- (I) Ineligible
- (W) Walk-on
- Injured
- Current redshirt

Roster
Last update: December 21, 2020

== Schedule and results ==
Date time, TV	Rank^{#}	Opponent^{#}	Result	Record	Site (attendance) city, state
Regular season
November 25, 2020*; 4:00 pm, Big West.TV		Westmont	W 97–79	1–0	Matadome; Northridge, CA
November 28, 2020*; 1:00 pm, FloHoops		vs. Air Force; Vegas Bubble	L 61–66	1–1	T-Mobile Arena; Paradise, NV
November 30, 2020*; 2:00 pm, FloHoops		vs. Seattle; Vegas Bubble	W 76–65	2–1	T-Mobile Arena; Paradise, NV
December 8, 2020*		at Fresno State	Canceled		Save Mart Center; Fresno, CA
December 12, 2020*; 6:00 pm, WCC Network		at Pepperdine	W 89–84	3–1	Firestone Fieldhouse; Malibu, CA
December 15, 2020*; 2:00 pm, ESPN3		Stanford	L 71–82	3–2	Matadome; Northridge, CA
December 16, 2020*; 4:00 pm, Big West.TV		Pacific	Postponed		Matadome; Northridge, CA
December 19, 2020*; 2:00 pm, P12N		at California	L 56–87	3–3	Haas Pavilion; Berkeley, CA
December 27, 2020; Big West.TV		at Cal State Fullerton	Canceled		Titan Gym; Fullerton, CA
December 28, 2020; Big West.TV		at Cal State Fullerton	Canceled		Titan Gym; Fullerton, CA
December 28, 2020*; 2:00 pm, Big West.TV		New Mexico State	W 66–63	4–3	Matadome; Northridge, CA
January 1, 2021; 4:00 pm, ESPN3		UC Irvine	Canceled		Matadome; Northridge, CA
January 2, 2021; 4:00 pm, ESPN3		UC Irvine	Canceled		Matadome; Northridge, CA
January 8, 2021; 5:00 pm, ESPN3		at UC San Diego	Canceled		RIMAC Arena; La Jolla, CA
January 9, 2021; 5:00 pm, ESPN3		at UC San Diego	Canceled		RIMAC Arena; La Jolla, CA
January 15, 2021; 4:00 pm, ESPN3		at Long Beach State	Canceled		Walter Pyramid; Long Beach, CA
January 16, 2021; 4:00 pm, ESPN3		at Long Beach State	Canceled		Walter Pyramid; Long Beach, CA
January 16, 2021; 7:00 pm, ESPN3		at Cal State Fullerton	W 86–85	5–3 (1–0)	Titan Gym; Fullerton, CA
January 17, 2021; 7:00 pm, Big West.TV		at Cal State Fullerton	L 77–85	5–4 (1–1)	Titan Gym; Fullerton, CA
January 22, 2021; 4:00 pm, Big West.TV		UC Santa Barbara	L 58–105	5–5 (1–2)	Matadome; Northridge, CA
January 23, 2021; 4:00 pm, Big West.TV		UC Santa Barbara	L 66–80	5–6 (1–3)	Matadome; Northridge, CA
January 29, 2021; 4:00 pm, Big West.TV		at Cal Poly	L 70–76	5–7 (1–4)	Mott Athletics Center; San Luis Obispo, CA
January 30, 2021; 4:00 pm, Big West.TV		at Cal Poly	W 64–51	6–7 (2–4)	Mott Athletics Center; San Luis Obispo, CA
February 5, 2021; 4:00 pm, ESPN3		UC Davis	W 80–77	7–7 (3–4)	Matadome; Northridge, CA
February 6, 2021; 2:00 pm, Big West.TV		UC Davis	L 63–75	7–8 (3–5)	Matadome; Northridge, CA
February 12, 2021*; 4:30 pm, GCU TV		at Grand Canyon	Canceled		GCU Arena; Phoenix, AZ
February 19, 2021; 4:00 pm, Big West.TV		Hawaii	L 74–75	7–9 (3–6)	Matadome; Northridge, CA
February 20, 2021; 4:00 pm, ESPN3		Hawaii	W 88–80 ^{OT}	8–9 (4–6)	Matadome; Northridge, CA
February 26, 2021; 7:00 pm, ESPN3		at Cal State Bakersfield	L 58–84	8–10 (4–7)	Icardo Center; Bakersfield, CA
February 27, 2021; 7:00 pm, ESPN3		at Cal State Bakersfield	W 90–87	9–10 (5–7)	Icardo Center; Bakersfield, CA
March 5, 2021; 4:00 pm, Big West.TV		UC Riverside	L 68–72	9–11 (5–8)	Matadome; Northridge, CA
March 6, 2021; 4:00 pm, Big West.TV		UC Riverside	L 65–66	9–12 (5–9)	Matadome; Northridge, CA
Big West tournament
March 9, 2021; 3:00 pm, ESPN3	(8)	vs. (9) Long Beach State; First Round	L 63–85	9–13	Mandalay Bay Events Center; Las Vegas, NV
*Non-conference game. ^{#}Rankings from AP Poll. (#) Tournament seedings in parentheses. All times are in Pacific.
