= Joe Pasternack =

American college basketball coach (born 1977)

Current position
- Title: Head coach
- Team: UC Santa Barbara
- Conference: Big West
- Record: 192–95 (.669)

Biographical details
- Born: April 15, 1977 (age 49); Metairie, Louisiana, U.S.
- Education: Indiana ('99)

Coaching career (HC unless noted)
- 2001–2007: California (assistant)
- 2007–2011: New Orleans
- 2011–2013: Arizona (assistant)
- 2013–2017: Arizona (assoc. HC)
- 2017–present: UC Santa Barbara

Head coaching record
- Overall: 246–155 (.613)
- Tournaments: 0–2 (NCAA Division I)

Accomplishments and honors

Championships
- 2 Big West regular season (2021, 2023); 2 Big West tournament (2021, 2023)

Awards
- Big West Coach of the Year (2021)

Joe Pasternack III (born April 15, 1977) is an American college basketball coach. He is the current head coach of the UC Santa Barbara Gauchos, having been appointed to the position in March 2017.

Pasternack served for four years (2007–11) as the head coach of the New Orleans Privateers. The University of Arizona hired Pasternack in 2011, and promoted him to Associate Head Coach of the Wildcats in 2013. In his six seasons with the team, he achieved a 174–47 record.

== Early and personal life ==
Pasternack was born in Metairie, Louisiana, grew up in New Orleans, Louisiana, and is Jewish. His parents are Joe Jr. and Sarah Pasternack. He attended Sunday school at a Reform synagogue in New Orleans, and became a bar mitzvah.

He and his wife, Lindsay (née Bernstein), have a son, Joe IV, and a daughter, Lilly. His wife served on the board of directors of the Tucson Jewish Community Center. Her brother Roxy Bernstein is a college basketball play-by-play announcer for ESPN.

== Education ==
Pasternack attended Metairie Park Country Day School in Metairie, Louisiana.

He attended Indiana University Bloomington, where he spent four years as a student manager for the Hoosiers men's basketball team under head coach Bob Knight. He graduated in 1999 with a B.S. in Marketing.

== Coaching career ==
Pasternack's first professional coaching position was at the University of California, Berkeley, where from 2000 until 2007 he worked in administrative roles and later served as assistant coach of the Golden Bears under head coach Ben Braun.

Pasternack next served for four years (2007–11) as the head coach of the University of New Orleans Privateers basketball team, a position he took in July 2007 after the resignation of Buzz Williams. He became the 11th head coach in UNO history. He earned a record of 54–60 (.474) while there. At the beginning of his second season at UNO, the university determined that Division 1 was not going to be economically feasible after Hurricane Katrina, and the university allowed its players to transfer as it planned to transition out of Division 1. His 2010–11 team went 16–6, topping the standings among Division I Independent institutions. Pasternack remained to fulfill his four-year contract, and then departed for an assistant position at Arizona.

The University of Arizona hired Pasternack, initially for $190,000, on May 19, 2011, after Archie Miller, brother of Arizona Head Coach Sean Miller, left the Wildcats to become head coach at Dayton. In June 2013 Pasternack was promoted to the position of Associate Head Coach. In his final season with the school, he earned $302,000. In his six seasons with the team, he achieved a 174–47 record.

On March 31, 2017, Pasternack, who was 39 years old at the time, was hired as the new Men's Head Basketball Coach for the UC Santa Barbara Gauchos. He became the third head coach of the team in 34 years.

For the 2020–21 season, Pasternack's Gauchos won the Big West regular season title and he was named conference coach of the year.

== Head coaching record ==
Record table
Season	Team	Overall	Conference	Standing	Postseason
New Orleans Privateers (Sun Belt Conference) (2007–2010)
2007–08	New Orleans	19–13	8–10	4th (West)	
2008–09	New Orleans	11–19	6–12	T–5th (West)	
2009–10	New Orleans	8–22	3–15	7th (West)	
New Orleans Privateers (Independent) (2010–2011)
2010–11	New Orleans	16–6			
New Orleans:		54–60 (.474)	17–37 (.315)		
UC Santa Barbara Gauchos (Big West Conference) (2017–present)
2017–18	UC Santa Barbara	23–9	11–5	T–2nd	
2018–19	UC Santa Barbara	22–10	10–6	T–2nd	
2019–20	UC Santa Barbara	21–10	10–6	T–2nd	NCAA Division I Cancelled
2020–21	UC Santa Barbara	22–5	13–3	1st	NCAA Division I Round of 64
2021–22	UC Santa Barbara	17–11	8–5	5th	
2022–23	UC Santa Barbara	27–8	15–5	T–1st	NCAA Division I Round of 64
2023–24	UC Santa Barbara	16–15	9–11	T–7th	
2024–25	UC Santa Barbara	21–13	11–9	5th	
2025–26	UC Santa Barbara	18–14	11–9	T–6th	
2026–27	UC Santa Barbara	5–0	0–0		
UCSB:		192–95 (.669)	95–59 (.617)		
Total:		246–155 (.613)			
National champion Postseason invitational champion Conference regular season champion Conference regular season and conference tournament champion Division regular season champion Division regular season and conference tournament champion Conference tournament champion
