= 2020–21 UC San Diego Tritons men's basketball team =

American college basketball team season

2020–21 UC San Diego Tritons men's basketball
- Conference: Big West Conference
- Record: 7–10 (4–8 Big West)
- Head coach: Eric Olen (8th season)
- Associate head coach: Clint Allard (7th season)
- Assistant coaches: Nick Booker (1st season); Brendan Clowry (7th season)
- Home arena: RIMAC Arena

2020–21 Big West men's basketball standings
	Conf.				Overall
Team	W		L	PCT	W		L	PCT
UC Santa Barbara †	13	–	3	.813	22	–	5	.815
UC Irvine	10	–	4	.714	18	–	9	.667
UC Riverside	8	–	4	.667	14	–	8	.636
UC Davis	6	–	4	.600	10	–	8	.556
Cal State Bakersfield	9	–	7	.563	15	–	11	.577
Hawai'i	9	–	9	.500	11	–	10	.524
Cal State Fullerton	5	–	7	.417	6	–	10	.375
Cal State Northridge	5	–	9	.357	9	–	13	.409
Long Beach State	4	–	8	.333	6	–	12	.333
Cal Poly	1	–	15	.063	4	–	20	.167
UC San Diego*	0	–	0	–	7	–	10	.412
† 2021 Big West tournament winner * ineligible for the 2021 NCAA tournament and 2021 Big West tournament due to transition period; Big West games not counted in standings

The 2020–21 UC San Diego Tritons men's basketball team represented the University of California, San Diego in the 2020–21 NCAA Division I men's basketball season. The Tritons, led by eighth-year head coach Eric Olen, were in their first season at the NCAA Division I level and played their games at RIMAC Arena as a member of the Big West Conference. Because of the transition period, games in the Big West did not count towards the standings or conference record, and the Tritons were ineligible for the postseason, including the Big West tournament.

== Previous season ==
The Tritons finished the 2019–20 season with a 30–1 record, 21–1 in California Collegiate Athletic Association (CCAA) play, to finish first in the CCAA. They later won the CCAA conference tournament with a 76–62 win over Cal Poly Pomona.

== Roster ==
2020–21 UC San Diego Tritons men's basketball team
Players
Coaches

Pos.	#	Name	Height	Weight	Year	Previous school	Hometown
G	0	Lunden Taylor	6 ft 3 in (1.91 m)	180 lb (82 kg)	RS So	San Joaquin Memorial HS	Fresno, CA
F	1	Hugh Baxter	6 ft 8 in (2.03 m)	210 lb (95 kg)	Sr	Scotch College, Melbourne	Melbourne, Australia
G	2	Tyrell Roberts	5 ft 11 in (1.8 m)	170 lb (77 kg)	RS Jr	Woodcreek HS	Sacramento, CA
G	3	Gabe Hadley	6 ft 4 in (1.93 m)	200 lb (91 kg)	Sr	Templestowe College	Launceston, Australia
G	4	Bryce Pope	6 ft 3 in (1.91 m)	185 lb (84 kg)	RS Fr	Torrey Pines HS	San Diego, CA
F	5	Marek Sullivan	6 ft 6 in (1.98 m)	195 lb (88 kg)	Sr	Torrey Pines HS	San Diego, CA
F	10	Toni Rocak (I)	6 ft 8 in (2.03 m)	220 lb (100 kg)	Jr	Phillips Exeter Academy; Regis	Geneva, Switzerland
F	11	Matt Gray	6 ft 8 in (2.03 m)	225 lb (102 kg)	RS So	Canobolas Rural Technology HS; Drake University; Salt Lake CC	Orange, Australia
G	12	Justin Pratt	6 ft 3 in (1.91 m)	190 lb (86 kg)	RS So	De La Salle HS (CA)	Lafayette, CA
F	13	Jake Kosakowski	6 ft 6 in (1.98 m)	202 lb (92 kg)	RS Fr	Whitney Young HS	Chicago, IL
G	14	Jake Killingsworth	6 ft 5 in (1.96 m)	205 lb (93 kg)	GS	Serra HS; Columbia University	San Carlos, CA
G	22	Jace Roquemore	6 ft 5 in (1.96 m)	160 lb (73 kg)	RS Fr	Foothill HS (NV)	Henderson, NV
G	23	Kaden Rasheed	6 ft 1 in (1.85 m)	185 lb (84 kg)	Jr	Santa Margarita HS	Ladera Ranch, CA
G	24	John Diener	6 ft 5 in (1.96 m)	190 lb (86 kg)	RS So	Cedarburg HS	Cedarburg, WI
F	25	Martin Tombe	6 ft 6 in (1.98 m)	209 lb (95 kg)	Sr	St. Augustine HS (CA)	San Diego, CA
G	32	Mikey Howell	6 ft 3 in (1.91 m)	165 lb (75 kg)	RS Sr	San Marcos HS	San Marcos, CA
F	33	Trace Ramsey	6 ft 7 in (2.01 m)	200 lb (91 kg)	Jr	Valparaiso HS	Valparaiso, IN

Head coach

- Eric Olen (Spring Hill)

Assistant coach(es)

- Clint Allard (UC San Diego)
  Associate head coach
- Nick Booker (Davidson)
- Brendan Clowry (Gardner–Webb)

Support staff

- Christian Bayne (UC San Diego)
  Director of operations

Athletic trainer(s)

- Vanessa Yang (Penn State)
  Associate AD – sports medicine

Legend

- (C) Team captain
- (S) Suspended
- (I) Ineligible
- (W) Walk-on
- Injured
- Current redshirt

Roster
Last update: December 7, 2020

== Schedule and results ==
Date time, TV	Rank^{#}	Opponent^{#}	Result	Record	High points	High rebounds	High assists	Site (attendance) city, state
Regular season
December 20, 2020*; 4:00 p.m., BigWest.TV		San Diego Christian	Cancelled due to the COVID-19 pandemic					RIMAC Arena; La Jolla, CA
December 22, 2020*; 6:00 p.m., BigWest.TV		St. Katherine	W 77–51	1–0	15 – Killingsworth	6 – Howell	5 – Roquemore	RIMAC Arena; La Jolla, CA
December 23, 2020*; 4:00 p.m., BigWest.TV		St. Katherine	W 75–39	2–0	13 – Killingsworth	6 – Rocak	7 – Roquemore	RIMAC Arena; La Jolla, CA
January 1, 2021; 4:00 p.m., BigWest.TV		at Cal Poly	Cancelled due to the COVID-19 pandemic					Mott Athletics Center; San Luis Obispo, CA
January 2, 2021; 3:00 p.m., BigWest.TV		at Cal Poly	Cancelled due to the COVID-19 pandemic					Mott Athletics Center; San Luis Obispo, CA
January 8, 2021; 5:00 p.m., ESPN3		Cal State Northridge	Cancelled due to the COVID-19 pandemic					RIMAC Arena; La Jolla, CA
January 9, 2021; 5:00 p.m., ESPN3		Cal State Northridge	Cancelled due to the COVID-19 pandemic					RIMAC Arena; La Jolla, CA
January 9, 2021*; 4:00 p.m., ESPN3		UC Irvine	L 65–79	2–1	21 – Pope	5 – Rocak	5 – Roquemore	RIMAC Arena; La Jolla, CA
January 15, 2021; 5:00 p.m., ESPN3		at UC Santa Barbara	L 52–69	2–2	13 – Pope	6 – Hadley	5 – Roquemore	The Thunderdome; Santa Barbara, CA
January 16, 2021; 5:00 p.m., ESPN3		at UC Santa Barbara	L 53–84	2–3	16 – Rocak	7 – Rocak	4 – Hadley	The Thunderdome; Santa Barbara, CA
January 22, 2021; 4:00 p.m., ESPN3		UC Davis	W 89–69	3–3	29 – Hadley	7 – tied	10 – Howell	RIMAC Arena; La Jolla, CA
January 23, 2021; 2:00 p.m., ESPN3		UC Davis	L 71–78	3–4	18 – Howell	7 – Baxter	4 – Howell	RIMAC Arena; La Jolla, CA
January 29, 2021; 4:00 p.m.		at Long Beach State	Cancelled due to the COVID-19 pandemic					Walter Pyramid; Long Beach, CA
January 30, 2021; 4:00 p.m.		at Long Beach State	Cancelled due to the COVID-19 pandemic					Walter Pyramid; Long Beach, CA
January 31, 2021*; 4:00 p.m., BigWest.TV		at UC Riverside	L 59–71	3–5	17 – Baxter	10 – Rocak	4 – Hadley	UCR Student Recreation Center; Riverside, CA
February 5, 2021; 5:00 p.m., ESPN3		Hawaii	Cancelled due to Big West Conference schedule realignment					RIMAC Arena; La Jolla, CA
February 6, 2021; 5:00 p.m., ESPN3		Hawaii	Cancelled due to Big West Conference schedule realignment					RIMAC Arena; La Jolla, CA
February 7, 2021*; 12:00 p.m., BigWest.TV		Bethesda	W 101–64	4–5	23 – Hadley	8 – Rocak	5 – tied	RIMAC Arena; La Jolla, CA
February 12, 2021; 7:00 p.m., ESPN3		at Cal State Bakersfield	L 71–76	4–6	20 – Rocak	12 – Rocak	6 – Howell	Icardo Center; Bakersfield, CA
February 13, 2021; 7:00 p.m., ESPN3		at Cal State Bakersfield	L 50–65	4–7	9 – Rocak	5 – Hadley	3 – Killingsworth	Icardo Center; Bakersfield, CA
February 19, 2021; 5:00 p.m., ESPN3		UC Riverside	L 75–81	4–8	19 – Rocak	5 – Rocak	11 – Howell	RIMAC Arena; La Jolla, CA
February 20, 2021; 5:00 p.m., ESPN3		UC Riverside	W 83–82 ^{OT}	5–8	25 – Hadley	5 – Rasheed	5 – Hadley	RIMAC Arena; La Jolla, CA
February 26, 2021; 4:00 p.m., ESPN3		at UC Irvine	L 55–80	5–9	11 – Baxter	6 – Rocak	3 – Taylor	Bren Events Center; Irvine, CA
February 27, 2021; 4:00 p.m., ESPN3		at UC Irvine	L 64–75	5–10	28 – Baxter	9 – Rocak	8 – Howell	Bren Events Center; Irvine, CA
March 5, 2021; 5:00 p.m., ESPN3		Cal State Fullerton	W 89–85	6–10	21 – Hadley	9 – Killingsworth	14 – Howell	RIMAC Arena; La Jolla, CA
March 6, 2021; 5:00 p.m., ESPN3		Cal State Fullerton	W 85–78	7–10	26 – Rocak	7 – tied	13 – Howell	RIMAC Arena; La Jolla, CA
*Non-conference game. ^{#}Rankings from AP poll. (#) Tournament seedings in parentheses. All times are in Pacific.
