= 2021 Big West Conference men's basketball tournament =

- Classification: Division I
- Season: 2020–21
- Teams: 10
- Site: Michelob Ultra Arena; Paradise, Nevada
- Champions: UC Santa Barbara (4th title)
- Winning coach: Joe Pasternack (1st title)
- MVP: JaQuori McLaughlin (UC Santa Barbara)
- Television: ESPN3; ESPNU; ESPN2

2020–21 Big West men's basketball standings
	Conf.				Overall
Team	W		L	PCT	W		L	PCT
UC Santa Barbara †	13	–	3	.813	22	–	5	.815
UC Irvine	10	–	4	.714	18	–	9	.667
UC Riverside	8	–	4	.667	14	–	8	.636
UC Davis	6	–	4	.600	10	–	8	.556
Cal State Bakersfield	9	–	7	.563	15	–	11	.577
Hawai'i	9	–	9	.500	11	–	10	.524
Cal State Fullerton	5	–	7	.417	6	–	10	.375
Cal State Northridge	5	–	9	.357	9	–	13	.409
Long Beach State	4	–	8	.333	6	–	12	.333
Cal Poly	1	–	15	.063	4	–	20	.167
UC San Diego*	0	–	0	–	7	–	10	.412
† 2021 Big West tournament winner * ineligible for the 2021 NCAA tournament and 2021 Big West tournament due to transition period; Big West games not counted in standings

The 2021 Big West Conference men's basketball tournament was the postseason men's basketball tournament for the Big West Conference of the 2020-21 NCAA Division I men's basketball season. It was held from March 9–13, 2021 at the Michelob Ultra Arena in Paradise, Nevada. The winner received the conference's automatic bid to the 2021 NCAA tournament.

== Seeds ==
Of the 11 conference teams, 10 were eligible for the tournament. UC San Diego was ineligible for this year's tournament, as they were in the first year of the four-year transition required for teams transferring to Division I from Division II. Teams were seeded by record within the conference, with a tiebreaker system to seed teams with identical conference records. Unlike previous years, reseeding teams after the quarterfinals did not take place for this year's tournament.

Seed	School	Conference	Tiebreaker
1	UC Santa Barbara	13–3	
2	UC Irvine	10–4	
3	UC Riverside	8–4	
4	UC Davis	6–4	
5	Cal State Bakersfield	9–7	
6	Hawaii	9–9	
7	Cal State Fullerton	5–7	
8	Cal State Northridge	5–9	
9	Long Beach State	4–8	
10	Cal Poly	1–15	

== Schedule and results ==
Game	Time	Matchup	Score	Television
First round – Tuesday, March 9
1	2:30 pm	No. 8 CSUN vs. No. 9 Long Beach State	63–85	ESPN3
2	5:00 pm	No. 7 CSU Fullerton vs. No. 10 Cal Poly	82–87	ESPN3
Quarterfinals – Thursday, March 11
3	11:00 am	No. 1 UC Santa Barbara vs. No. 9 Long Beach State	95–87	ESPN3
4	2:00 pm	No. 4 UC Davis vs. No. 5 CSU Bakersfield	58–56	ESPN3
5	5:00 pm	No. 2 UC Irvine vs. No. 10 Cal Poly	58–51	ESPN3
6	8:00 pm	No. 3 UC Riverside vs. No. 6 Hawaii	62–52	ESPN3
Semifinals – Friday, March 12
7	6:00 pm	No. 1 UC Santa Barbara vs. No. 4 UC Davis	71–55	ESPN3
8	9:00 pm	No. 2 UC Irvine vs. No. 3 UC Riverside	78–61	ESPNU
Final – Saturday, March 13
9	8:30 pm	No. 1 UC Santa Barbara vs. No. 2 UC Irvine	79–63	ESPN2
*Game times in PST. Rankings denote tournament seed

== Bracket ==
First round March 9 ESPN3
8	Cal State Northridge	63
9	Long Beach State	85
7	Cal State Fullerton	82
10	Cal Poly	87

Quarterfinals; March 11; ESPN3
1	UC Santa Barbara	95
9	Long Beach State	87
4	UC Davis	58
5	Cal State Bakersfield	56
2	UC Irvine	58
10	Cal Poly	51
3	UC Riverside	62
6	Hawaii	52

Semifinals; March 12; ESPN3/ESPNU
1	UC Santa Barbara	71
4	UC Davis	55
2	UC Irvine	78
3	UC Riverside	61

Championship; March 13; ESPN2
1	UC Santa Barbara	79
2	UC Irvine	63
