= 2020–21 UC Riverside Highlanders men's basketball team =

American college basketball team season

2020–21 UC Riverside Highlanders men's basketball
- Conference: Big West Conference
- Record: 14–8 (8–4 Big West)
- Head coach: Mike Magpayo (1st season)
- Assistant coaches: Michael Czepil (3rd season); Michael Lecak (2nd season); Wayne Hunter (1st season)
- Home arena: SRC Arena (Capacity: 2,750)

2020–21 Big West men's basketball standings
	Conf.				Overall
Team	W		L	PCT	W		L	PCT
UC Santa Barbara †	13	–	3	.813	22	–	5	.815
UC Irvine	10	–	4	.714	18	–	9	.667
UC Riverside	8	–	4	.667	14	–	8	.636
UC Davis	6	–	4	.600	10	–	8	.556
Cal State Bakersfield	9	–	7	.563	15	–	11	.577
Hawai'i	9	–	9	.500	11	–	10	.524
Cal State Fullerton	5	–	7	.417	6	–	10	.375
Cal State Northridge	5	–	9	.357	9	–	13	.409
Long Beach State	4	–	8	.333	6	–	12	.333
Cal Poly	1	–	15	.063	4	–	20	.167
UC San Diego*	0	–	0	–	7	–	10	.412
† 2021 Big West tournament winner * ineligible for the 2021 NCAA tournament and 2021 Big West tournament due to transition period; Big West games not counted in standings

The 2020–21 UC Riverside Highlanders men's basketball team represented the University of California, Riverside in the 2020–21 NCAA Division I men's basketball season. The Highlanders, led by first-year head coach Mike Magpayo, played their home games at SRC Arena in Riverside, California as members of the Big West Conference.

== Previous season ==
The Highlanders finished the 2019–20 season 17–15, 6–9 in Big West play to finish sixth in the Big West Conference standings. Initially set to play UC Santa Barbara in the Big West Conference tournament, the tournament was cancelled due to the COVID-19 pandemic, ending the Highlanders' season.

On July 1, 2020, associate head coach Mike Magpayo was elevated to head coach of the program, replacing David Patrick, who had accepted an associate coach position at Arkansas. Magpayo, who is Filipino–American, thus became the first head coach of Asian descent in Division I men's basketball history.

== Roster ==
Rather unusually, nine out of the fourteen players on UCR's roster during the 2020–21 season were from either Australia or New Zealand, with four players coming from the city of Melbourne alone, compared to only five who were from the United States.

2020–21 UC Riverside Highlanders men's basketball team
Players
Coaches

Pos.	#	Name	Height	Weight	Year	Previous school	Hometown
G	0	Dragan Elkaz	6 ft 5 in (1.96 m)	205 lb (93 kg)	Jr	Westfields Sports HS	Green Valley, NSW, Australia
F	1	Arinze Chidom	6 ft 9 in (2.06 m)	240 lb (109 kg)	RS Sr	Washington State	Oakland, CA
SG	2	Quinton Ford	6 ft 3 in (1.91 m)	185 lb (84 kg)	RS Fr	Copperas Cove HS	Copperas Cove, TX
G/F	4	Daniel Mading	6 ft 9 in (2.06 m)	200 lb (91 kg)	RS Jr	San Jacinto CC	Perth, WA, Australia
PG	5	Zyon Pullin	6 ft 4 in (1.93 m)	195 lb (88 kg)	So	College Park HS	Pleasant Hill, CA
PF	10	Oliver Hayes-Brown	6 ft 10 in (2.08 m)	210 lb (95 kg)	RS Fr	Peninsula Grammar	Melbourne, VIC, Australia
PG	11	Flynn Cameron	6 ft 5 in (1.96 m)	210 lb (95 kg)	Jr	DePaul	Auckland, New Zealand
SG	14	Wil Tattersall	6 ft 6 in (1.98 m)	198 lb (90 kg)	Fr	Center of Excellence	Melbourne, VIC, Australia
C	15	Jock Perry	7 ft 1 in (2.16 m)	250 lb (113 kg)	RS Sr	Saint Mary's	Melbourne, VIC, Australia
G	22	Dominick Pickett (W)	6 ft 3 in (1.91 m)	210 lb (95 kg)	RS Sr	Rancho Verde HS	Moreno Valley, CA
F/C	23	Angus McWilliam	6 ft 10 in (2.08 m)	240 lb (109 kg)	RS Jr	TCU	Christchurch, New Zealand
SG	24	Jaylen Cross	6 ft 4 in (1.93 m)	185 lb (84 kg)	So	Culver City HS	Melbourne, VIC, Australia
C	25	Callum McRae	7 ft 1 in (2.16 m)	275 lb (125 kg)	Jr	Palmerston North Boys HS	Palmerston North, New Zealand
G	35	George Willborn III	6 ft 3 in (1.91 m)	195 lb (88 kg)	Sr	UTSA	Chicago, IL

Head coach

- Mike Magpayo (UC Santa Barbara)

Assistant coach(es)

- Michael Czepil (Nicholls)
- Michael Lecak (Pittsburgh)
- Wayne Hunter (Saint Mary's)

Support staff

- Jordan Lee (UC Riverside)
  Director of Basketball Operations
- Tony Ontiveros (San Diego State)
  Associate AD/Sports Medicine & Performance

Legend

- (C) Team captain
- (S) Suspended
- (I) Ineligible
- (W) Walk-on
- Injured
- Current redshirt

Roster
Last update: December 4, 2020

== Schedule and results ==
Date time, TV	Rank^{#}	Opponent^{#}	Result	Record	High points	High rebounds	High assists	Site (attendance) city, state
Regular season
November 25, 2020*; 2:00 p.m.		at Pacific	L 60–66	0–1	16 – Chidom	8 – Cameron	4 – Pullin	Alex G. Spanos Center; Stockton, CA
November 30, 2020*		at Fresno State	Cancelled					Save Mart Center; Fresno, CA
December 1, 2020*; 1:00 p.m., Flohoops		at Washington; Men's Vegas Bubble	W 57–42	1–1	21 – Perry	12 – Chidom	9 – Pullin	T-Mobile Arena; Paradise, NV
December 2, 2020*; 4:00 p.m.		Bethesda	Postponed to a later date					SRC Arena; Riverside, CA
December 6, 2020*; 12:00 p.m.		at Denver	W 83–63	2–1	22 – Pullin	8 – Hayes-Brown	6 – Pickett	Hamilton Gymnasium; Denver, CO
December 10, 2020*; 5:00 p.m., Pluto TV		at Northern Arizona	W 74–50	3–1	17 – Chidom	7 – Hayes-Brown	5 – Cameron	Rolle Activity Center; Flagstaff, AZ
December 19, 2020*; 4:00 p.m.		Southern	Canceled due to positive COVID-19 tests					SRC Arena; Riverside, CA
December 27, 2020; 4:00 p.m.		Long Beach State	Postponed to a later date					SRC Arena; Riverside, CA
December 28, 2020; 4:00 p.m.		Long Beach State	Postponed to a later date					SRC Arena; Riverside, CA
January 1, 2021		at UC Davis	Canceled due to positive COVID-19 tests					The Pavilion; Davis, CA
January 2, 2021		at UC Davis	Canceled due to positive COVID-19 tests					The Pavilion; Davis, CA
January 8, 2021; 4:00 p.m., BigWest.tv		Hawaii	L 83–88	3–2 (0–1)	20 – Chidom	10 – Pullin	3 – Pickett	SRC Arena; Riverside, CA
January 9, 2021; 4:00 p.m., BigWest.tv		Hawaii	W 70–68	4–2 (1–1)	15 – Chidom	4 – Tied	4 – Chidom	SRC Arena; Riverside, CA
January 12, 2021*; 6:00 p.m., P12N		at USC	L 62–67 ^{OT}	4–3	16 – Pickett	10 – Perry	4 – Pickett	Galen Center; Los Angeles, CA
January 15, 2021; 4:00 p.m.		at Cal Poly	W 86–51	5–3 (2–1)	19 – Tattersall	7 – 3 tied	6 – Pullin	Mott Athletics Center; San Luis Obispo, CA
January 16, 2020; 4:00 p.m.		at Cal Poly	W 70–53	6–3 (3–1)	20 – Pullin	8 – Tied	6 – Pickett	Mott Athletics Center; San Luis Obispo, CA
January 22, 2021; 4:00 p.m.		Cal State Bakersfield	L 45–47	6–4 (3–2)	13 – Pullin	9 – Pullin	3 – Tied	SRC Arena; Riverside, CA
January 23, 2021; 4:00 p.m.		Cal State Bakersfield	W 70–63	7–4 (4–2)	14 – Tied	6 – Hayes-Brow	3 – Tied	SRC Arena; Riverside, CA
January 31, 2021; 4:00 p.m.		UC San Diego	W 71–59	8–4 (4–2)	14 – Perry	9 – Pullin	6 – Pullin	SRC Arena; Riverside, CA
February 5, 2021; 5:00 p.m.		at Cal State Fullerton	Canceled due to positive COVID-19 tests					Titan Gym; Fullerton, CA
February 6, 2021; 5:00 p.m.		at Cal State Fullerton	Canceled due to positive COVID-19 tests					Titan Gym; Fullerton, CA
February 12, 2021; 4:00 p.m.		UC Irvine	W 86–65	9–4 (5–2)	22 – Pickett	8 – Chidom	6 – Pullin	SRC Arena; Riverside, CA
February 13, 2021; 9:00 p.m., ESPNU		UC Irvine	L 67–73	9–5 (5–3)	17 – Chidom	6 – Cameron	4 – Pullin	SRC Arena; Riverside, CA
February 19, 2021; 5:00 p.m., ESPN3		at UC San Diego	W 81–75	10–5 (5–3)	19 – Pickett	7 – Chidom	6 – Pullin	RIMAC Arena; La Jolla, CA
February 20, 2021; 5:00 p.m., ESPN3		at UC San Diego	L 82–83 ^{OT}	10–6 (5–3)	19 – Chidom	8 – Cameron	6 – Pullin	RIMAC Arena; La Jolla, CA
February 26, 2021; 8:00 p.m., ESPN2		UC Santa Barbara	L 68–72	10–7 (5–4)	17 – Chidom	4 – Chidom	3 – Chidom	SRC Arena; Riverside, CA
February 27, 2021; 7:00 p.m., ESPN3		UC Santa Barbara	W 68–52	11–7 (6–4)	21 – Pullin	11 – Hayes-Brown	5 – Pullin	SRC Arena; Riverside, CA
March 5, 2021; 4:00 p.m.		at Cal State Northridge	W 72–68	12–7 (7–4)	17 – Pullin	8 – Perry	7 – Pullin	Matadome; Northridge, CA
March 6, 2021; 4:00 p.m.		at Cal State Northridge	W 66–65	13–7 (8–4)	18 – Cameron	8 – Perry	5 – Pullin	Matadome; Northridge, CA
Big West tournament
March 11, 2021; 6:30 p.m., ESPN3	(3)	vs. (6) Hawaii; Quarterfinals	W 62–52	14–7	14 – Pickett	7 – Perry	5 – Pullin	Michelob Ultra Arena; Paradise, NV
March 12, 2021; 9:00 pm, ESPNU	(3)	vs. (2) UC Irvine; Semifinals	L 61–78	14–8	16 – Perry	10 – Perry	5 – Pullin	Michelob Ultra Arena; Paradise, NV
*Non-conference game. ^{#}Rankings from AP Poll. (#) Tournament seedings in parentheses. All times are in Pacific Time Zone.
