= Main Event (college basketball) =

- Formerly: MGM Grand Main Event (2014); Men Who Speak Up Main Event (2015–2016); MGM Resorts Main Event (2017–2019); Men's Vegas Bubble (2020); Roman Main Event (2021)
- Sport: College Basketball
- Founded: 2014
- Folded: 2023
- Owner: bdG Sports
- No. of teams: 4
- Country: United States
- Venues: Heavyweight Bracket; T-Mobile Arena (2017–present); MGM Grand Garden Arena (2014–2016); Middleweight Bracket; Ed W. Clark High School (2019); Cox Pavilion (2018); T-Mobile Arena (2017); MGM Grand Garden Arena (2014–2016)
- Last champion: San Diego State
- Broadcasters: ESPN (2021–2022); ESPN2, ESPNU (2014–2019, 2021–present); FloHoops (2020); ESPN+ (2023–present)
- Sponsor: Continental Tire
- Related competitions: Ball Dawgs Classic
- Website: Continental Tire Main Event

The Continental Tire Main Event (formerly known as the MGM Grand Main Event, Men Who Speak Up Main Event, MGM Resorts Main Event, Roman Main Event, Men's Vegas Bubble) was a four-team college basketball tournament held during Monday and Wednesday of Thanksgiving week of the NCAA Division I men's basketball season, with the inaugural tournament beginning in 2014.

== Tournament format ==
The tournament originally featured two four-team brackets (labeled Heavyweight and Middleweight) with each team playing two games in Las Vegas. Members of the Heavyweight bracket each host at least one member of the Middleweight bracket on campus before the tournament. Since the Middleweight bracket's dissolution in 2021, the tournament continues to find opponents for members of the formerly named Heavyweight bracket to host on campus that would have played in the Middleweight bracket.

While the Heavyweight bracket pool always features four teams, the Middleweight bracket pool's size is variable, ranging from as little as two teams to as many as five. Despite this, only up to four teams in the Middleweight bracket pool played in Las Vegas. Since 2021, two teams that would have played in the Middleweight bracket each play two Heavyweight opponents before facing each other on campus.

== Tournament champions ==
Year	Team	Bracket
2014	Oklahoma State	Heavyweight
2014	Round Robin – No Winner	Middleweight
2015	Creighton	Heavyweight
2015	Howard	Middleweight
2016	Valparaiso	Heavyweight
2016	Round Robin – No Winner	Middleweight
2017	UNLV	Heavyweight
2017	Prairie View A&M	Middleweight
2018	Arizona State	Heavyweight
2018	Utah Valley	Middleweight
2019	Colorado	Heavyweight
2019	Round Robin – No Winner	Middleweight
2020	Baylor	-
2021	Arizona	−
2022	Virginia	−
2023	San Diego State	−

== Brackets ==
* – Denotes overtime period

=== 2023 – Continental Tire Main Event ===
First Round; November 17; ESPN+/ESPN2
Saint Mary's	54
San Diego State	79
Washington	74
Xavier	71

Championship; November 19; ESPN2
San Diego State	100*
Washington	97
Consolation; November 19; ESPN+
Saint Mary's	49
Xavier	66

=== 2022 – Continental Tire Main Event ===
First Round; November 18; ESPN2/ESPNU
5	Baylor	79
16	Virginia	86
19	Illinois	79
8	UCLA	70

Championship; November 20; ESPN
16	Virginia	70
19	Illinois	61
Consolation; November 20; ESPN
5	Baylor	80
8	UCLA	75

Campus-game contender(s): Norfolk State beat Monmouth 64–59.

=== 2021 – Roman Main Event ===
First Round; November 19; ESPNU/ESPN2
Arizona	82*
Wichita State	78
4	Michigan	74
UNLV	61

Championship; November 21; ESPN
Arizona	80
4	Michigan	62
Consolation; November 21; ESPN2
Wichita State	74
UNLV	73

Campus-game contender(s): North Dakota State beat Tarleton State 54–53.

=== 2020 – Men's Vegas Bubble ===
The event had a unique format due to the COVID-19 pandemic. It also adopted the temporary name "Men's Vegas Bubble" and aired on FloHoops. Despite including Baylor as the 2020 champion, no other records from this year are included in the tournament's history and records page.

==== Schedule ====
Date	Time	Winner	Loser	Score
November 28	1 p.m.	Air Force	CSUN	66–61
November 28	5 p.m.	Baylor	Louisiana	112–82
November 29	12 p.m.	Seattle	Air Force	63–45
November 29	3 p.m.	Baylor	Washington	86–52
November 30	2 p.m.	CSUN	Seattle	76–65
December 1	1 p.m.	Cal Riverside	Washington	57–42
WINNERS ARE IN BOLD. Game times in Pacific Time.

=== 2019 – MGM Resorts Main Event ===
==== Heavyweight Bracket ====
First Round; November 24; ESPN3/ESPN2
23	Colorado	56
Wyoming	41
Clemson	62*
TCU	60

Championship; November 26; ESPN2
21	Colorado	71
Clemson	67
Consolation; November 26; FloSports
Wyoming	47
TCU	64

==== Middleweight Bracket ====
	Detroit Mercy	UC Irvine	Louisiana
Detroit Mercy	—	86–74	62–81
UC Irvine	74–86	—	92–67
Louisiana	81–62	67–92	—

=== 2018 – MGM Resorts Main Event ===
==== Heavyweight Bracket ====
First Round; November 19; ESPNU/ESPN3
Arizona State	72
15	Mississippi State	67
Saint Mary's	63
Utah State	80

Championship; November 21; ESPNU
Arizona State	87
Utah State	82
Consolation; November 21; BD Global
15	Mississippi State	61
Saint Mary's	57

==== Middleweight Bracket ====
First Round; November 19
Utah Valley	72
Hartford	65
Iona	85
Long Beach State	86

Championship; November 21
Utah Valley	87
Long Beach State	72
Consolation; November 21
Hartford	75
Iona	80

Campus-game contender(s): McNeese State (Iona did not play any campus games.)

=== 2017 – MGM Resorts Main Event ===
==== Heavyweight Bracket ====
First Round; November 20; AT&T Sportsnet Rocky Mountain; AT&T Sportsnet
UNLV	95
Rice	68
Utah	83
Ole Miss	74

Championship; November 22; ESPN2
UNLV	85
Utah	58
Consolation; November 22; ESPNU
Rice	62
Ole Miss	79

==== Middleweight Bracket ====
First Round; November 20; Flohoops.com
Prairie View A&M	80
Eastern Kentucky	70
Georgia State	68
Eastern Washington	50

Championship; November 22; Flohoops.com
Prairie View A&M	71
Georgia State	56
Consolation; November 22; Flohoops.com
Eastern Kentucky	62
Eastern Washington	83

=== 2016 – Men Who Speak Up Main Event ===
==== Heavyweight Bracket ====
First Round; November 21; YouTube
Saint Louis	62
BYU	92
Alabama	60
Valparaiso	68

Championship; November 23; ESPN2
BYU	89
Valparaiso	92
Consolation; November 23; YouTube
Saint Louis	57
Alabama	62

==== Middleweight Bracket ====
	Ball State	Coppin State	Coastal Carolina	Southern Utah
Ball State	—	79–77	—	94–83
Coppin State	77–79	—	59–89	—
Coastal Carolina	—	89-59	—	83–68
Southern Utah	94–83	—	68–83	—

=== 2015 – Men Who Speak Up Main Event ===
==== Heavyweight Bracket ====
First Round; November 23; YouTube
Clemson	65
UMass	82
Creighton	85
Rutgers	75

Championship; November 25; ESPN2
UMass	76
Creighton	97
Consolation; November 25; ESPN2
Clemson	76
Rutgers	58

==== Middleweight Bracket ====
First Round; November 23
UTSA	84
Central Arkansas	98
Texas Southern	81
Howard	87

Championship; November 25
Central Arkansas	54
Howard	73
Consolation; November 25
UTSA	80
Texas Southern	91

=== 2014 – MGM Grand Main Event ===
==== Heavyweight Bracket ====
First Round; November 24; ESPN3/ESPNU
Oregon State	53
Oklahoma State	66
Auburn	35
Tulsa	53

Championship; November 26; ESPN2
Oklahoma State	73
Tulsa	58
Consolation; November 26; ESPN3
Oregon State	69
Auburn	71

==== Middleweight Bracket ====
On October 6, 2014, the Middleweight Bracket was revised to a round-robin format.

	Milwaukee	Louisiana–Lafayette	Oral Roberts
Milwaukee	—	56–52	66–69
Louisiana–Lafayette	52–56	—	76–52
Oral Roberts	69–66	52–76	—
