= 2020–21 UC Irvine Anteaters men's basketball team =

American college basketball season

2020–21 UC Irvine Anteaters men's basketball
- Conference: Big West Conference
- Record: 18–9 (10–4 Big West)
- Head coach: Russell Turner (11th season)
- Assistant coaches: Ryan Badrtalei; Michael Wilder; Alex Young
- Captains: Brad Greene; Collin Welp
- Home arena: Bren Events Center (Capacity: 5,000)

2020–21 Big West men's basketball standings
	Conf.				Overall
Team	W		L	PCT	W		L	PCT
UC Santa Barbara †	13	–	3	.813	22	–	5	.815
UC Irvine	10	–	4	.714	18	–	9	.667
UC Riverside	8	–	4	.667	14	–	8	.636
UC Davis	6	–	4	.600	10	–	8	.556
Cal State Bakersfield	9	–	7	.563	15	–	11	.577
Hawai'i	9	–	9	.500	11	–	10	.524
Cal State Fullerton	5	–	7	.417	6	–	10	.375
Cal State Northridge	5	–	9	.357	9	–	13	.409
Long Beach State	4	–	8	.333	6	–	12	.333
Cal Poly	1	–	15	.063	4	–	20	.167
UC San Diego*	0	–	0	–	7	–	10	.412
† 2021 Big West tournament winner * ineligible for the 2021 NCAA tournament and 2021 Big West tournament due to transition period; Big West games not counted in standings

The 2020–21 UC Irvine Anteaters men's basketball team represented the University of California, Irvine in the 2020–21 NCAA Division I men's basketball season. They played their home games at the Bren Events Center in Irvine, California as a member of the Big West Conference. The Anteaters were led by 11th-year head coach Russell Turner. The team finished the season with an 18–9 (10–4) record finishing 2nd place in the standings and advanced to the 2021 Big West Conference men's basketball tournament where they were defeated by UC Santa Barbara 63–79. The Anteaters continued their success finishing 1st or 2nd for 7 straight seasons in the Big West Conference and 4 straight Big West tournament Championship games (the 2020 Big West Conference men's basketball tournament was canceled due to the COVID-19 pandemic). The school set a new scoring record and the largest margin of victory (80) on November 28, 2020 over NAIA opponent Bethesda University by the score of 135–55. Also new school records broken in that game were assists (31) and FGs made (56). New Bren Events Center records broken were the most points scored in a first half (70) and game FG % (0.691).

== Previous season ==
The Anteaters finished the 2019–20 season 21–11, 13–3 in Big West play to win their second straight regular season title. However, the Big West tournament and all other postseason tournaments were canceled as a result of the ongoing COVID-19 pandemic, effectively ending their season.

The program has won at least 20 games in seven of the last eight seasons. Russell Turner became the winningest coach in program history on January 15 surpassing Pat Douglass's total of 197 wins and won his fourth Big West Coach of the Year Award. Evan Leonard, Eyassu Worku, and Tommy Rutherford all recorded their 1000th point during the season, the first time the program has had three players score 1,000 career points in the same season. The team was 12th in the nation in field goal percentage defense, holding opponents to (38.8%) shooting, 11th in total rebounds (1,269), and third in rebounding margin (+9.4). Brad Greene set a Bren Events Center record with 21 rebounds on January 11 vs Hawaii.

== Roster ==
The Anteaters had the 2nd youngest team in the nation with 13 underclassmen, behind Navy which had 19.

2019–20 UC Irvine Anteaters men's basketball team
Players
Coaches

Pos.	#	Name	Height	Weight	Year	Previous school	Hometown
F	0	JC Butler	6 ft 5 in (1.96 m)	200 lb (91 kg)	RS So	The Prairie School	Racine, Wisconsin
G	1	Dawson Baker	6 ft 3 in (1.91 m)	180 lb (82 kg)	Fr	Capistrano Valley High School	Coto De Caza, California
G	2	Justin Hohn	6 ft 1 in (1.85 m)	180 lb (82 kg)	RS Fr	Tea High	Sioux Falls, South Dakota
G	4	Andre Henry	6 ft 4 in (1.93 m)	175 lb (79 kg)	Fr	Saint Francis High School	La Cañada Flintridge, California
G	5	Isaiah Lee	6 ft 2 in (1.88 m)	195 lb (88 kg)	So	Australian Institute of Sport	Sydney, NSW, Australia
G	10	Ofure Ujadughele (W)	6 ft 3 in (1.91 m)	210 lb (95 kg)	RS Fr	Chino Hills High School	Chino Hills, California
F	11	Hunter Ruck	6 ft 9 in (2.06 m)	220 lb (100 kg)	Fr	Rancho Solano Prep	Scottsdale, Arizona
G	13	Austin Johnson	6 ft 9 in (2.06 m)	223 lb (101 kg)	So	Link Year Prep/Wheeler High School	Marietta, Georgia
G	15	Jeron Artest	6 ft 3 in (1.91 m)	184 lb (83 kg)	So	Bella Vista Prep	Scottsdale, Arizona
G	21	Jayce Catchings (W)	6 ft 4 in (1.93 m)	190 lb (86 kg)	Fr	Rancho Christian School	St. Louis, Missouri
G	22	DJ Davis	6 ft 0 in (1.83 m)	160 lb (73 kg)	Fr	Riverside Polytechnic High School	Moreno Valley, California
F	25	Emmanuel Tshimanga	7 ft 0 in (2.13 m)	300 lb (136 kg)	RS Fr	Bella Vista Prep	Scottsdale, Arizona
F	31	Dean Keeler	6 ft 9 in (2.06 m)	210 lb (95 kg)	So	Marina High School	Westminster, California
F	40	Collin Welp	6 ft 9 in (2.06 m)	225 lb (102 kg)	RS Jr	Seattle Preparatory School	Seattle, Washington
C	55	Brad Greene	6 ft 11 in (2.11 m)	270 lb (122 kg)	RS Sr	Lone Pine High School	Lone Pine, California

Head coach

- Russell Turner (Hampden–Sydney)

Assistant coach(es)

- Ryan Badrtalei (UCLA)
- Michael Wilder (UC Irvine)
- Alex Young (UC Irvine)

Legend

- (C) Team captain
- (S) Suspended
- (I) Ineligible
- (W) Walk-on
- Injured
- Current redshirt

Roster
Last update: 1 December 2020

== Schedule and results ==
Date time, TV	Rank^{#}	Opponent^{#}	Result	Record	High points	High rebounds	High assists	Site (attendance) city, state
Regular season
November 25, 2020*; 3:30 pm		vs. Pepperdine	L 72–86	0–1	20 – Greene	9 – Greene	6 – Baker	Viejas Arena (0); San Diego, CA
November 27, 2020*; 4:00 pm, MWN/YurView		at San Diego State	L 58–77	0–2	11 – Greene	8 – Greene	4 – Butler	Viejas Arena (0); San Diego, CA
November 28, 2020*; 8:00 pm, Big West TV		Bethesda	W 135–55	1–2	20 – Johnson	16 – Johnson	6 – Lee	Bren Events Center (0); Irvine, CA
December 02, 2020*; 6:00 pm, Big West TV		La Sierra	W 104–54	2–2	21 – Baker	9 – Butler	3 – Tied	Bren Events Center (0); Irvine, CA
December 08, 2020*; 7:00 pm, P12N		at USC	L 56–91	2–3	17 – Baker	7 – Tied	5 – Henry	Galen Center (0); Los Angeles, CA
December 17, 2020*; 7:00 pm, WCCN		at Loyola Marymount	L 48–51	2–4	12 – Baker	19 – Welp	2 – Welp	Gersten Pavilion (0); Los Angeles
December 19, 2020*; 4:00 pm, Big West TV		San Diego	W 85–53	3–4	16 – Welp	9 – Greene	6 – Lee	Bren Events Center (0); Irvine, CA
December 27, 2020; 4:00 pm, ESPN3		UC Santa Barbara	W 75–56	4–4 (1–0)	14 – Greene	12 – Greene	4 – Tied	Bren Events Center (0); Irvine, CA
December 28, 2020; 4:00 pm, ESPN3		UC Santa Barbara	W 73–69	5–4 (2–0)	16 – Welp	9 – Welp	3 – Welp	Bren Events Center (0); Irvine, CA
January 01, 2021; 4:00 pm		at Cal State Northridge	Canceled due to COVID-19 issues.					Matadome; Northridge, CA
January 02, 2021; 4:00 pm		at Cal State Northridge	Canceled due to COVID-19 issues.					Matadome; Northridge, CA
January 08, 2021; 4:00 pm		UC Davis	Canceled due to Yolo County restrictions.					Bren Events Center; Irvine, CA
January 09, 2021; 4:00 pm		UC Davis	Canceled due to Yolo County restrictions.					Bren Events Center; Irvine, CA
January 8, 2021*; 4:00 pm		at UC San Diego	Canceled due to COVID-19 issues.					RIMAC Arena; La Jolla, CA
January 9, 2021*; 4:00 pm, ESPN3		at UC San Diego	W 79–65	6–4	23 – Davis	6 – Welp	3 – Tied	RIMAC Arena (0); La Jolla, CA
January 22, 2021; 4:00 pm, ESPN3		Cal Poly	W 68–49	7–4 (3–0)	15 – Welp	8 – Greene	3 – Welp	Bren Events Center (0); Irvine, CA
January 23, 2021; 4:00 pm, ESPN3		Cal Poly	W 67–44	8–4 (4–0)	18 – Welp	7 – Tied	3 – Hohn	Bren Events Center (0); Irvine, CA
January 29, 2021; 9:00 pm, Spectrum OC16 Big West TV		at Hawaii	W 53–51	9–4 (5–0)	18 – Greene	14 – Greene	4 – Davis	Stan Sheriff Center (0); Honolulu, HI
January 30, 2021; 9:00 pm, Spectrum OC16 Big West TV		at Hawaii	L 61–62 ^{OT}	9–5 (5–1)	20 – Welp	11 – Greene	2 – Artest	Stan Sheriff Center (0); Honolulu, HI
February 05, 2021; 4:00 pm, ESPN3		Cal State Bakersfield	W 70–53	10–5 (6–1)	16 – Welp	8 – Greene	2 – Tied	Bren Events Center (0); Irvine, CA
February 06, 2021; 7:00 pm, ESPNU		Cal State Bakersfield	L 57–62	10–6 (6–2)	14 – Welp	8 – Welp	3 – Davis	Bren Events Center (0); Irvine, CA
February 12, 2021; 4:00 pm, ESPN3 Wildcard		at UC Riverside	L 65–86	10–7 (6–3)	21 – Davis	7 – Greene	3 – Welp	SRC (0); Riverside, CA
February 13, 2021; 9:00 pm, ESPNU		at UC Riverside	W 73–67	11–7 (7–3)	27 – Welp	13 – Welp	4 – Lee	SRC (0); Riverside, CA
February 19, 2021; 5:00 pm, Big West TV		at Cal State Fullerton	W 89–78	12–7 (8–3)	23 – Baker	11 – Welp	4 – Baker	Titan Gym (0); Fullerton, CA
February 20, 2021; 5:00 pm, Big West TV		at Cal State Fullerton	L 64–67	12–8 (8–4)	21 – Welp	13 – Greene	3 – Lee	Titan Gym (0); Fullerton, CA
February 26, 2021*; 4:00 pm, ESPN3		UC San Diego	W 80–55	13–8	29 – Welp	10 – Welp	4 – Davis	Bren Events Center (0); Irvine, CA
February 27, 2021*; 4:00 pm, ESPN3		UC San Diego	W 75–64	14–8	19 – Welp	12 – Welp	3 – Tied	Bren Events Center (0); Irvine, CA
March 05, 2021; 4:00 pm, ESPN3		at Long Beach State	W 71–68 ^{OT}	15–8 (9–4)	18 – Tied	9 – Greene	5 – Davis	Walter Pyramid (0); Long Beach, CA
March 06, 2021; 4:00 pm, ESPN3		at Long Beach State	W 73–58	16–8 (10–4)	14 – Baker	9 – Welp	3 – Tied	Walter Pyramid (0); Long Beach, CA
Big West tournament
March 11, 2021; 5:00 pm, ESPN3	(2)	vs. (10) Cal Poly; Quarterfinals	W 58–51	17–8	15 – Welp	10 – Welp	2 – Tied	Michelob Ultra Arena (0); Paradise, NV
March 12, 2021; 9:00 pm, ESPNU	(2)	vs. (3) UC Riverside; Semifinals	W 78–61	18–8	17 – Tied	7 – Greene	2 – Tied	Michelob Ultra Arena (0); Paradise, NV
March 13, 2021; 8:30 pm, ESPN2	(2)	vs. (1) UC Santa Barbara; Championship	L 63–79	18–9	22 – Welp	8 – Greene	2 – Greene	Michelob Ultra Arena (17); Paradise, NV
*Non-conference game. ^{#}Rankings from AP Poll. (#) Tournament seedings in parentheses.
