= 2020–21 Cal Poly Mustangs men's basketball team =

American college basketball season

2020–21 Cal Poly Mustangs men's basketball
- Conference: Big West Conference
- Record: 4–20 (1–15 Big West)
- Head coach: John Smith (2nd season)
- Associate head coach: Rodney Tention
- Assistant coaches: David Hanson; Justin Downer
- Home arena: Mott Athletics Center (Capacity: 3,032)

2020–21 Big West men's basketball standings
	Conf.				Overall
Team	W		L	PCT	W		L	PCT
UC Santa Barbara †	13	–	3	.813	22	–	5	.815
UC Irvine	10	–	4	.714	18	–	9	.667
UC Riverside	8	–	4	.667	14	–	8	.636
UC Davis	6	–	4	.600	10	–	8	.556
Cal State Bakersfield	9	–	7	.563	15	–	11	.577
Hawai'i	9	–	9	.500	11	–	10	.524
Cal State Fullerton	5	–	7	.417	6	–	10	.375
Cal State Northridge	5	–	9	.357	9	–	13	.409
Long Beach State	4	–	8	.333	6	–	12	.333
Cal Poly	1	–	15	.063	4	–	20	.167
UC San Diego*	0	–	0	–	7	–	10	.412
† 2021 Big West tournament winner * ineligible for the 2021 NCAA tournament and 2021 Big West tournament due to transition period; Big West games not counted in standings

The 2020–21 Cal Poly Mustangs men's basketball team represented California Polytechnic State University in the 2020–21 NCAA Division I men's basketball season. The Mustangs, led by second-year head coach John Smith, played their home games at the Mott Athletics Center in San Luis Obispo, California as members of the Big West Conference.

== Previous season ==
The Mustangs finished the 2019–20 season 7–23, 4–12 in Big West play to finish in last place. They failed to qualify for the Big West tournament (although the Big West tournament was ultimately cancelled due to the COVID-19 pandemic).

== Roster ==
2020–21 Cal Poly Mustangs men's basketball team
Players
Coaches

Pos.	#	Name	Height	Weight	Year	Previous school	Hometown
PG	0	Keith Smith	6 ft 0 in (1.83 m)	170 lb (77 kg)	RS Sr	VMI	Danville, CA
G	1	Camren Pierce	5 ft 10 in (1.78 m)	175 lb (79 kg)	Fr	Etiwanda HS	Rancho Cucamonga, CA
G	2	Kobe Sanders	6 ft 6 in (1.98 m)	175 lb (79 kg)	Fr	Christian HS	San Diego, CA
G	3	Colby Rogers	6 ft 5 in (1.96 m)	190 lb (86 kg)	So	Roselle Catholic HS	Covington, GA
F	4	Dyson Koehler	6 ft 7 in (2.01 m)	220 lb (100 kg)	Fr	Jordan HS	Salt Lake City, UT
G/F	5	Mark Crowe	6 ft 5 in (1.96 m)	205 lb (93 kg)	Sr	Wilson HS	Dallas, TX
G	11	Aidan Prukop	6 ft 4 in (1.93 m)	180 lb (82 kg)	Fr	Mater Dei HS	Ladera Ranch, CA
G	12	Ryan Evans	6 ft 2 in (1.88 m)	190 lb (86 kg)	Fr	Mater Dei HS	Coto de Caza, CA
G	13	Nick Carlson	6 ft 0 in (1.83 m)	155 lb (70 kg)	Fr	Helix HS	La Mesa, CA
F	14	Tuukka Jaakkola	6 ft 10 in (2.08 m)	240 lb (109 kg)	Jr	Helsinki Basketball Academy	Helsinki, Finland
F	15	Alimamy Koroma	6 ft 8 in (2.03 m)	220 lb (100 kg)	So	Prolific Prep Academy	Freetown, Sierra Leone
F	21	Riley Till	6 ft 7 in (2.01 m)	200 lb (91 kg)	GS	Iowa	Dubuque, IA
F	23	Brantly Stevenson	6 ft 4 in (1.93 m)	185 lb (84 kg)	Fr	Etiwanda HS	Rancho Cucamonga, CA
F	30	Hank Hollingsworth	6 ft 10 in (2.08 m)	235 lb (107 kg)	GS	Chelan HS	Chelan, WA
F	33	Kyle Colvin (injured)	6 ft 6 in (1.98 m)	200 lb (91 kg)	RS So	Mission Prep HS	San Luis Obispo, CA

Head coach

- John Smith (Dominican (CA))

Assistant coach(es)

- Rodney Tention (San Francisco)
- David Hanson (Cal Poly)
- Justin Downer (Jessup)

Legend

- (C) Team captain
- (S) Suspended
- (I) Ineligible
- (W) Walk-on
- Injured
- Current redshirt

Roster
Last update: November 25, 2020

== Schedule and results ==
Date time, TV	Rank^{#}	Opponent^{#}	Result	Record	Site (attendance) city, state
Non-conference regular season
November 27, 2020*; 4:00 pm, BigWest.TV		Bethesda	W 100–46	1–0	Mott Athletics Center; San Luis Obispo, CA
December 4, 2020*; 6:00 pm, BigWest.TV		San Francisco	L 60–88	1–1	Mott Athletics Center; San Luis Obispo, CA
December 9, 2020*; 6:00 pm, BigWest.TV		Santa Clara	L 69–76	1–2	Mott Athletics Center; San Luis Obispo, CA
December 13, 2020*; 1:00 pm, BigWest.TV		San Jose State	W 75–71	2–2	Mott Athletics Center; San Luis Obispo, CA
December 16, 2020*; 3:00 pm, BigWest.TV		San Diego	L 61–70	2–3	Mott Athletics Center; San Luis Obispo, CA
December 19, 2020*; 7:00 pm		at Loyola Marymount	L 52–76	2–4	Gersten Pavilion; Los Angeles, CA
Big West regular season
December 27, 2020		at Hawaii	Postponed		Stan Sheriff Center; Honolulu, HI
December 28, 2020		at Hawaii	Postponed		Stan Sheriff Center; Honolulu, HI
January 1, 2021		UC San Diego	Cancelled		Mott Athletics Center; San Luis Obispo, CA
January 2, 2021		UC San Diego	Cancelled		Mott Athletics Center; San Luis Obispo, CA
January 8, 2021; 7:00 pm, ESPN3		at Cal State Bakersfield	L 49–62	2–5 (0–1)	Icardo Center; Bakersfield, CA
January 9, 2021; 7:00 pm, ESPN3		at Cal State Bakersfield	L 50–65	2–6 (0–2)	Icardo Center; Bakersfield, CA
January 15, 2021; 4:00 pm, BigWest.TV		UC Riverside	L 51–86	2–7 (0–3)	Mott Athletics Center; San Luis Obispo, CA
January 16, 2021; 4:00 pm, BigWest.TV		UC Riverside	L 53–70	2–8 (0–4)	Mott Athletics Center; San Luis Obispo, CA
January 22, 2021; 4:00 pm		at UC Irvine	L 49–68	2–9 (0–5)	Bren Events Center; Irvine, CA
January 23, 2021; 4:00 pm		at UC Irvine	L 44–67	2–10 (0–6)	Bren Events Center; Irvine, CA
January 29, 2021; 4:00 pm, BigWest.TV		Cal State Northridge	W 76–70	3–10 (1–6)	Mott Athletics Center; San Luis Obispo, CA
January 30, 2021; 4:00 pm, BigWest.TV		Cal State Northridge	L 51–64	3–11 (1–7)	Mott Athletics Center; San Luis Obispo, CA
February 5, 2021; 9:00 pm		at Hawaii	L 68–84	3–12 (1–8)	Stan Sheriff Center; Honolulu, Hawaii
February 6, 2021; 9:00 pm		at Hawaii	L 64–81	3–13 (1–9)	Stan Sheriff Center; Honolulu, Hawaii
February 12, 2021; 4:00 pm, BigWest.TV		Cal State Fullerton	Canceled		Mott Athletics Center; San Luis Obispo, CA
February 13, 2021; 4:00 pm, BigWest.TV		Cal State Fullerton	Canceled		Mott Athletics Center; San Luis Obispo, CA
February 19, 2021; 4:00 pm		at Long Beach State	L 60–64	3–14 (1–10)	Walter Pyramid; Long Beach, CA
February 20, 2021; 4;00 pm		at Long Beach State	L 69–74	3–15 (1–11)	Walter Pyramid; Long Beach, CA
February 26, 2021; 4:00 pm		UC Davis	L 61–69	3–16 (1–12)	Walter Pyramid; Long Beach, CA
February 27, 2021; 4:00 pm		UC Davis	L 66–68 ^{OT}	3–17 (1–13)	Walter Pyramid; Long Beach, CA
March 5, 2021; 5:00 pm, ESPN3		at UC Santa Barbara; Blue–Green Rivalry	L 57–71	3–18 (1–14)	The Thunderdome; Santa Barbara, CA
March 6, 2021; 5:00 pm		at UC Santa Barbara; Blue–Green Rivalry	L 54–70	3–19 (1–15)	The Thunderdome; Santa Barbara, CA
Big West tournament
March 9, 2021; 6:00 pm, ESPN3	(10)	vs. (7) Cal State Fullerton; First round	W 87–82	4–19	Michelob Ultra Arena; Las Vegas, NV
March 11, 2021; 5:00 pm, ESPN3	(10)	vs. (2) UC Irvine; Quarterfinals	L 51–58	4–20	Michelob Ultra Arena; Las Vegas, NV
*Non-conference game. ^{#}Rankings from AP Poll. (#) Tournament seedings in parentheses. All times are in Pacific.
