= 2020–21 Hawaii Rainbow Warriors basketball team =

American college basketball season

2020–21 Hawaii Rainbow Warriors basketball
- Conference: Big West Conference
- Record: 11–10 (9–9 Big West)
- Head coach: Eran Ganot (6th season)
- Assistant coaches: Chris Gerlufsen (2nd season); John Montgomery (6th season); Jabari Trotter (3rd season)
- Captains: Justin Webster; Casdon Jardine
- Home arena: Stan Sheriff Center (Capacity: 10,300)

2020–21 Big West men's basketball standings
	Conf.				Overall
Team	W		L	PCT	W		L	PCT
UC Santa Barbara †	13	–	3	.813	22	–	5	.815
UC Irvine	10	–	4	.714	18	–	9	.667
UC Riverside	8	–	4	.667	14	–	8	.636
UC Davis	6	–	4	.600	10	–	8	.556
Cal State Bakersfield	9	–	7	.563	15	–	11	.577
Hawai'i	9	–	9	.500	11	–	10	.524
Cal State Fullerton	5	–	7	.417	6	–	10	.375
Cal State Northridge	5	–	9	.357	9	–	13	.409
Long Beach State	4	–	8	.333	6	–	12	.333
Cal Poly	1	–	15	.063	4	–	20	.167
UC San Diego*	0	–	0	–	7	–	10	.412
† 2021 Big West tournament winner * ineligible for the 2021 NCAA tournament and 2021 Big West tournament due to transition period; Big West games not counted in standings

The 2020–21 Hawaii Rainbow Warriors basketball team represented the University of Hawaii at Manoa during the 2020–21 NCAA Division I men's basketball season. The Rainbow Warriors, led by sixth-year head coach Eran Ganot, played their home games at the Stan Sheriff Center in Honolulu, Hawaii. Hawaii was a member of the Big West Conference, and participated in their 9th season in that league.

== Previous season ==
The Rainbow Warriors finished the 2019–20 season 17–13, 8–8 in Big West play to finish fourth place. However, they were unable to play a single game in the Big West Conference tournament due to the COVID-19 pandemic.

== Departures ==
Name	Number	Position	Height	Weight	Year	Hometown	Reason for departure
Drew Buggs	1	G	6' 3"	195	Redshirt Junior	Long Beach, California	Transferred to Missouri
Eddie Stansberry	3	G	6' 3"	190	Senior	San Francisco, California	Graduated
Jessiya Villa	4	G	5' 11"	175	Freshman	Laie, Hawaii	Transferred to Chaminade
Garrett Cason	12	F	6' 6"	200	Freshman	Fairfield, California	Departed program
Zigmars Raimo	14	F	6' 9"	225	Senior	Madona, Latvia	Graduated
Owen Hulland	15	C	7' 0"	230	Sophomore	Adelaide, Australia	Departed program
Ahmed Ali	23	G	5' 11"	170	Senior	Toronto, Ontario	Transferred to Portland
Dawson Carper	44	C	7' 0"	250	Sophomore	Colorado Springs, Colorado	Transferred to Missouri State

=== Incoming transfers ===
Name	Position	Height	Year	Hometown	Notes
Manel Ayol	F	6' 7"	Junior	Melbourne, Australia	Junior college transfer from Western Wyoming College
Noel Coleman	G	6' 1"	Sophomore	Leopoldsburg, Belgium	Transferred from San Diego
Casdon Jardine	F	6' 7"	Senior	Twin Falls, Idaho	Transferred from Utah Valley
James Jean-Marie	F/C	6' 8"	Senior	Montreal, Canada	Transferred from San Diego
JoVon McClanahan	G	5' 11"	Sophomore	Vallejo, California	Junior college transfer from Sheridan College

== 2020 Commitments ==
College recruiting information
Name	Hometown	School	Height	Weight	Commit date
Biwali Bayles; G	Sydney, Australia	BA Centre of Excellence	6 ft 1 in (1.85 m)	180 lb (82 kg)	
Biwali Bayles; G	Recruit ratings: No ratings found				
Beon Riley; G	San Diego, California	Cathedral Catholic High School	6 ft 6 in (1.98 m)	230 lb (100 kg)	
Beon Riley; G	Recruit ratings: No ratings found				
Overall recruit ranking:
Note: In many cases, Scout, Rivals, 247Sports, On3, and ESPN may conflict in their listings of height and weight.; In these cases, the average was taken. ESPN grades are on a 100-point scale.; Sources: "2020 Team Ranking". Rivals.

== Preseason ==
=== Media poll ===
The preseason poll was released on November 12, 2020. Hawaiʻi was picked to finish fourth in the Big West Conference standings.

Predicted finish	Team	Votes (1st place)
1	UC Irvine	270 (18)
2	UC Santa Barbara	254 (9)
3	UC Davis	182 (1)
4	Hawaii	165
5	UC Riverside	160
6	Long Beach State	141
7	CSU Bakersfield	117
8	CSU Northridge	102
9	Cal State Fullerton	95
10	Cal Poly	54

=== Preseason Big West Men's Basketball All-Conference Team ===
The Rainbow Warriors did not have anyone named to the preseason All-Conference Team.

== Roster ==
2020–21 Hawaii Rainbow Warriors men's basketball team
Players
Coaches

Pos.	#	Name	Height	Weight	Year	Previous school	Hometown
G	0	Junior Madut	6 ft 6 in (1.98 m)	180 lb (82 kg)	RS Jr	Wyndham HS; Eastern Florida State College	Sydney, Australia
F/C	1	James Jean-Marie	6 ft 8 in (2.03 m)	230 lb (104 kg)	Sr	Athlos Leadership Academy; Navarro College; San Diego	Montreal, Canada
G	2	Justin Webster (C)	6 ft 3 in (1.91 m)	180 lb (82 kg)	So	Hargrave Military Academy	Dallas, Texas
G	3	Jovan McClanahan	5 ft 11 in (1.8 m)	170 lb (77 kg)	So	Salesian College Prep; Sheridan College	Vallejo, California
G	4	Noel Coleman	6 ft 1 in (1.85 m)	175 lb (79 kg)	So	Sunrise Christian Academy; San Diego	Leopoldsburg, Belgium
F	5	Bernardo da Silva	6 ft 9 in (2.06 m)	220 lb (100 kg)	So	Wasatch Academy	Rio das Ostras, Brazil
G	10	Beon Riley	6 ft 5 in (1.96 m)	230 lb (104 kg)	Fr	Cathedral Catholic HS	Chula Vista, California
C	11	Mate Colina	7 ft 0 in (2.13 m)	245 lb (111 kg)	RS Jr	Lake Ginninderra HS	Melbourne, Australia
G	14	Biwali Bayles	6 ft 1 in (1.85 m)	185 lb (84 kg)	Fr	Alexandria Park Community School	Redfern, NSW, Australia
F	20	Zoar Nedd	6 ft 7 in (2.01 m)	225 lb (102 kg)	RS So	Kapolei HS	Kapolei, Hawaii
F	22	Casdon Jardine (C)	6 ft 7 in (2.01 m)	215 lb (98 kg)	Sr	Twin Falls HS; Utah Valley	Twin Falls, Idaho
F	23	Manel Ayol	6 ft 7 in (2.01 m)	185 lb (84 kg)	Jr	Notre Dame Catholic School; Western Wyoming College	Melbourne, Australia
G/F	32	Samuta Avea (Opt-out) (redshirt)	6 ft 6 in (1.98 m)	200 lb (91 kg)	Sr	Kahuku HS	Hauʻula, Hawaii
G/F	42	Justin Hemsley	6 ft 6 in (1.98 m)	195 lb (88 kg)	RS Jr	Damien HS	Rancho Cucamonga, California
G	50	Kameron Ng	5 ft 11 in (1.8 m)	170 lb (77 kg)	So	Saint Francis School	Kaneohe, Hawaii

Head coach

- Eran Ganot (Swarthmore)

Assistant coach(es)

- Chris Gerlufsen (Randolph–Macon)
  Offensive Coordinator/Guards
- John Montgomery (Loyola Marymount)
  Defensive Coordinator/Passing Coordinator/Post Players/Scouting Coordinator
- Jabari Trotter (Dartmouth)
  Wing Players/Rebounding & Transition

Support staff

- Jesse Nakanishi (Lewis & Clark)
  Director of Basketball Operations
- Dominic Drury (Saint Mary's)
  Assistant Director of Basketball Operations
- Gibson Johnson (Hawaiʻi)
  Graduate Manager
- Jack Rydquist (San Diego State)
  Graduate Manager

Strength and conditioning coach(es)

- Tanner Hull (Missouri)
  Assistant Strength & Conditioning Coordinator

Athletic trainer(s)

- Lawrence Lam
  Assistant Athletic Trainer

Legend

- (C) Team captain
- (S) Suspended
- (I) Ineligible
- (W) Walk-on
- Injured
- Current redshirt

Roster
Last update: December 11, 2020

== Schedule and results ==
Date time, TV	Rank^{#}	Opponent^{#}	Result	Record	High points	High rebounds	High assists	Site (attendance) city, state
Non-conference regular season
December 11, 2020*; 7:00 p.m., Spectrum Sports		Hawaii Pacific	W 83–50	1–0	21 – Jean-Marie	11 – Jean-Marie	3 – Coleman	Stan Sheriff Center; Honolulu, HI
December 19, 2020*; 7:00 p.m., Spectrum Sports		Hawaii–Hilo	W 89–66	2–0	15 – Webster	10 – Jardine	5 – Bayles	Stan Sheriff Center; Honolulu, HI
Big West regular season
December 27, 2020 (Note: The series was originally canceled, but later rescheduled after the UC San Diego series was canceled by mutual agreement.)		Cal Poly	Postponed due to the COVID-19 pandemic; rescheduled for February 5					Stan Sheriff Center; Honolulu, HI
December 28, 2020		Cal Poly	Postponed due to the COVID-19 pandemic; rescheduled for February 6					Stan Sheriff Center; Honolulu, HI
January 8, 2021; 2:00 p.m., BigWest.tv		at UC Riverside	W 88–83	3–0 (1–0)	24 – Jean-Marie	7 – Madut	3 – Madut	SRC Arena; Riverside, CA
January 9, 2021; 2:00 p.m., BigWest.tv		at UC Riverside	L 68–70	3–1 (1–1)	26 – Jardine	9 – Jardine	3 – McClanahan	SRC Arena; Riverside, CA
January 15, 2021; 7:00 p.m., Spectrum Sports		Cal State Bakersfield	L 55–60	3–2 (1–2)	12 – Madut	10 – Madut	3 – Bayles	Stan Sheriff Center; Honolulu, HI
January 16, 2021; 7:00 p.m., Spectrum Sports		Cal State Bakersfield	L 72–83	3–3 (1–3)	23 – Webster	3 – Tied	3 – Tied	Stan Sheriff Center; Honolulu, HI
January 22, 2021; 3:00 p.m., ESPN3		at Cal State Fullerton	L 67–83	3–4 (1–4)	20 – Webster	9 – Bayles	4 – Tied	Titan Gym; Fullerton, CA
January 23, 2021; 3:00 p.m., ESPN3		at Cal State Fullerton	W 76–53	4–4 (2–4)	14 – Madut	11 – Colina	5 – McClanahan	Titan Gym; Fullerton, CA
January 29, 2021; 7:00 p.m., Spectrum Sports		UC Irvine	L 51–53	4–5 (2–5)	14 – Jardine	6 – Jean-Marie	5 – McClanahan	Stan Sheriff Center; Honolulu, HI
January 30, 2021; 7:00 p.m., Spectrum Sports		UC Irvine	W 62–61 ^{OT}	5–5 (3–5)	22 – Madut	7 – Colina	3 – Madut	Stan Sheriff Center; Honolulu, HI
February 5, 2021 (Note: The series against UC San Diego was cancelled by mutual agreement; thus, the Cal Poly series was rescheduled for these dates, and deemed postponed.); 7:00 p.m., Spectrum Sports		Cal Poly	W 84–68	6–5 (4–5)	20 – Webster	9 – Colina	3 – Tied	Stan Sheriff Center; Honolulu, HI
February 6, 2021; 7:00 p.m., Spectrum Sports		Cal Poly	W 81–64	7–5 (5–5)	20 – Jean-Marie	8 – Jardine	7 – McClanahan	Stan Sheriff Center; Honolulu, HI
February 12, 2021; 7:00 p.m., Spectrum Sports		UC Santa Barbara	L 50–59	7–6 (5–6)	10 – Jean-Marie	6 – Colina	1 – Tied	Stan Sheriff Center; Honolulu, HI
February 13, 2021; 5:00 p.m., Spectrum Sports		UC Santa Barbara	L 74–81 ^{OT}	7–7 (5–7)	25 – Jardine	6 – Jardine	5 – Bayles	Stan Sheriff Center; Honolulu, HI
February 19, 2021; 2:00 p.m., ESPN3		at Cal State Northridge	W 75–74	8–7 (6–7)	23 – Madut	7 – Jean-Marie	3 – Tied	Matadome; Northridge, CA
February 20, 2021; 2:00 p.m., ESPN3		at Cal State Northridge	L 80–88 ^{OT}	8–8 (6–8)	22 – Jardine	3 – Bayles	6 – Bayles	Matadome; Northridge, CA
February 26, 2021; 7:00 p.m., Spectrum Sports		Long Beach State	W 78–76	9–8 (7–8)	16 – Webster	7 – Hemsley	3 – McClanahan	Stan Sheriff Center; Honolulu, HI
February 27, 2021; 5:00 p.m., Spectrum Sports		Long Beach State	W 79–76	10–8 (8–8)	20 – Jean-Marie	12 – Jean-Marie	4 – Madut	Stan Sheriff Center; Honolulu, HI
March 5, 2021; 2:00 p.m., BigWest.tv		at UC Davis	W 73–68	11–8 (9–8)	17 – Webster	8 – Jean-Marie	4 – Tied	The Pavilion; Davis, CA
March 6, 2021; 2:00p.m., BigWest.tv		at UC Davis	L 66–74	11–9 (9–9)	19 – Jean-Marie	8 – Jean-Marie	2 – Jean-Marie	The Pavilion; Davis, CA
Big West tournament
March 11, 2021; 6:30 p.m., ESPN3	(6)	vs. (3) UC Riverside; Quarterfinals	L 52–62	11–10	12 – Madut	8 – Jardine	3 – Tied	Michelob Ultra Arena; Paradise, NV
*Non-conference game. ^{#}Rankings from AP Poll. (#) Tournament seedings in parentheses. All times are in Hawaii–Aleutian Time.

=== Notes ===
Source:
