= 2020–21 Long Beach State Beach men's basketball team =

American college basketball season

2020–21 Long Beach State Beach men's basketball
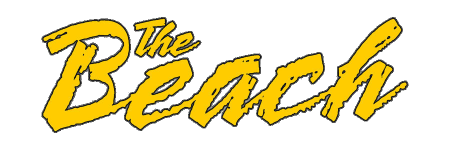
- Conference: Big West Conference
- Record: 6–12 (4–8 Big West)
- Head coach: Dan Monson (14th season)
- Assistant coaches: Myke Scholl; Senque Carey; Bobby Braswell
- Home arena: Walter Pyramid (Capacity: 4,200)

2020–21 Big West men's basketball standings
	Conf.				Overall
Team	W		L	PCT	W		L	PCT
UC Santa Barbara †	13	–	3	.813	22	–	5	.815
UC Irvine	10	–	4	.714	18	–	9	.667
UC Riverside	8	–	4	.667	14	–	8	.636
UC Davis	6	–	4	.600	10	–	8	.556
Cal State Bakersfield	9	–	7	.563	15	–	11	.577
Hawai'i	9	–	9	.500	11	–	10	.524
Cal State Fullerton	5	–	7	.417	6	–	10	.375
Cal State Northridge	5	–	9	.357	9	–	13	.409
Long Beach State	4	–	8	.333	6	–	12	.333
Cal Poly	1	–	15	.063	4	–	20	.167
UC San Diego*	0	–	0	–	7	–	10	.412
† 2021 Big West tournament winner * ineligible for the 2021 NCAA tournament and 2021 Big West tournament due to transition period; Big West games not counted in standings

The 2020–21 Long Beach State men's basketball team represented California State University, Long Beach, in the 2020–21 NCAA Division I men's basketball season. The Beach were led by 14th-year head coach Dan Monson and played their home game at the Walter Pyramid in Long Beach, California as a member of the Big West Conference. In a season limited due to the ongoing COVID-19 pandemic, they finished the season 6–12, 4–8 in Big West play to finish in ninth place. They defeated Cal State Northridge in the first round of the Big West tournament before losing to UC Santa Barbara in the quarterfinals.

== Previous season ==
Long Beach State finished the 2019–20 season 11–21, 6–10 in Big West play to finish in a tie for seventh place. The Big West tournament was canceled due to the ongoing COVID-19 pandemic effectively ending the 49ers season.

== Roster ==
2020–21 Long Beach State Beach men's basketball team
Players
Coaches

Pos.	#	Name	Height	Weight	Year	Previous school	Hometown
G	0	RJ Rhoden	6 ft 3 in (1.91 m)	195 lb (88 kg)	RS Fr	Mainland HS	Daytona Beach, Florida
G/F	2	Jordan Roberts	6 ft 9 in (2.06 m)	200 lb (91 kg)	Sr	Ridgeview HS	Bakersfield, California
G	3	Drew Cobb	6 ft 4 in (1.93 m)	205 lb (93 kg)	Sr	Fresno City College	Sacramento, California
G	4	Justin Rene	6 ft 3 in (1.91 m)	175 lb (79 kg)	RS Fr	Long Beach Poly HS	Long Beach, California
G	5	Shaden Knight	5 ft 10 in (1.78 m)	150 lb (68 kg)	RS Fr	Rancho Cucamonga HS	Rancho Cucamonga, California
G	11	Isaiah Washington	6 ft 1 in (1.85 m)	195 lb (88 kg)	Sr	Iona	Harlem, New York
G	12	Jadon Jones	6 ft 5 in (1.96 m)	170 lb (77 kg)	Fr	St. Anthony HS	Long Beach, California
F	13	Romelle Mansel	6 ft 9 in (2.06 m)	230 lb (104 kg)	So	St. Bernard HS	Playa del Rey, California
G	14	Colin Slater	6 ft 1 in (1.85 m)	175 lb (79 kg)	Sr	Tulane	New Orleans, Louisiana
F	24	Joe Hampton	6 ft 8 in (2.03 m)	250 lb (113 kg)	Jr	East Los Angeles CC	Washington, D.C.
F	25	Teddy Ochieng	6 ft 8 in (2.03 m)	195 lb (88 kg)	So	Panola CC	Nairobi, Kenya
G	31	Chance Hunter	6 ft 6 in (1.98 m)	190 lb (86 kg)	Jr	Cerritos CC	Inglewood, California
C	32	Trever Irish	7 ft 0 in (2.13 m)	185 lb (84 kg)	Jr	Central Arizona CC	Lewiston, Maine
F	35	Raymond Hawkins III	6 ft 9 in (2.06 m)	240 lb (109 kg)	So	Alabama	East Oakland, California
C	40	Jeffrey Yan	6 ft 9 in (2.06 m)	275 lb (125 kg)	So	Capistrano Valley Christian School	Shanghai, China
C		Milos Apic	6 ft 10 in (2.08 m)	200 lb (91 kg)	Jr	Sandy Spring Friends School	Novi Sad, Serbia

Head coach

- Dan Monson (Idaho)

Assistant coach(es)

- Myke Scholl (Loyola Marymount)
- Senque Carey (New Mexico)
- Bobby Braswell (Cal State Northridge)
- Marc Rodgers (Central Washington)

Legend

- (C) Team captain
- (S) Suspended
- (I) Ineligible
- (W) Walk-on
- Injured
- Current redshirt

Roster
Last update: March 26, 2021

== Schedule and results ==
Date time, TV	Rank^{#}	Opponent^{#}	Result	Record	High points	High rebounds	High assists	Site (attendance) city, state
Regular season
November 30, 2020*; 6:30 p.m., P12N		at UCLA	Canceled due to COVID-19 issues					Pauley Pavilion; Los Angeles, CA
December 4, 2020*; 6:00 p.m.		at Loyola Marymount	L 61–85	0–1	19 – Carter III	9 – Mansel	3 – Tied	Gersten Pavilion (0); Los Angeles, CA
December 6, 2020*; 2:00 p.m.		Seattle	W 80–75	1–1	21 – Washington	13 – Hunter	7 – Washington	Walter Pyramid (0); Long Beach, CA
December 10, 2020*; 6:00 p.m.		at San Francisco	L 62–107	1–2	9 – Hampton	8 – Hunter	2 – Washington	War Memorial Gymnasium (0); San Francisco, CA
December 27, 2020		at UC Riverside	Canceled due to COVID-19 issues					SRC Arena; Riverside, CA
December 28, 2020		at UC Riverside	Canceled due to COVID-19 issues					SRC Center; Riverside, CA
January 1, 2021; 4:00 p.m., ESPN3		Cal State Bakersfield	W 90–89 ^{OT}	2–2 (1–0)	25 – Carter III	6 – Washington	4 – Carter III	Walter Pyramid (0); Long Beach, CA
January 2, 2021; 4:00 p.m., ESPN3		Cal State Bakersfield	L 76–89	2–3 (1–1)	18 – Washington	6 – Rhoden	3 – Washington	Walter Pyramid (0); Long Beach, CA
January 8, 2021; 5:00 p.m.		at Cal State Fullerton	W 82–80	3–3 (2–1)	20 – Washington	7 – Tied	3 – Tied	Titan Gym (0); Fulerton, CA
January 9, 2021; 5:00 p.m.		at Cal State Fullerton	L 72–75 ^{OT}	3–4 (2–2)	17 – Jones	12 – Irish	9 – Washington	Titan Gym (0); Fulerton, CA
January 15, 2021; 4:00 p.m., ESPN3		Cal State Northridge	Canceled due to COVID-19 issues					Walter Pyramid; Long Beach, CA
January 16, 2021; 4:00 p.m., ESPN3		Cal State Northridge	Canceled due to COVID-19 issues					Walter Pyramid; Long Beach, CA
January 23, 2021*; 6:00 p.m.		at California Baptist	L 75–96	3–5	16 – Carter III	3 – 4 tied	5 – Washington	CBU Events Center (0); Riverside, CA
January 29, 2021; 4:00 p.m., ESPN3		UC San Diego	Canceled due to COVID-19 issues					Walter Pyramid; Long Beach, CA
January 30, 2021; 4:00 p.m., ESPN3		UC San Diego	Canceled due to COVID-19 issues					Walter Pyramid; Long Beach, CA
February 5, 2021; 5:00 p.m.		at UC Santa Barbara	Canceled due to COVID-19 issues					UCSB Events Center; Santa Barbara, CA
February 6, 2021; 5:00 p.m.		at UC Santa Barbara	Canceled due to COVID-19 issues					UCSB Events Center; Santa Barbara, CA
February 12, 2021; 3:00 p.m.		at UC Davis	L 66–68	3–6 (2–3)	19 – Hampton	8 – Cobb	3 – 3 tied	The Pavilion (0); Davis, CA
February 13, 2021; 1:00 p.m.		at UC Davis	L 76–78 ^{OT}	3–7 (2–4)	20 – Jones	9 – Hampton	6 – Carter III	The Pavilion (0); Davis, CA
February 19, 2021; 4:00 p.m.		Cal Poly	W 64–60	4–7 (3–4)	23 – Carter III	10 – Carter III	3 – Washington	Walter Pyramid (0); Long Beach, CA
February 20, 2021; 4:00 p.m.		Cal Poly	W 74–69	5–7 (4–4)	15 – Carter III	7 – Hunter	7 – Washington	Walter Pyramid (0); Long Beach, CA
February 26, 2021; 9:00 p.m.		at Hawaii	L 76–78	5–8 (4–5)	23 – Hunter	9 – Hunter	4 – Washington	Stan Sheriff Center (0); Honolulu, HI
February 27, 2021; 7:00 p.m.		at Hawaii	L 76–79	5–9 (4–6)	20 – Carter III	7 – tied	5 – Washington	Stan Sheriff Center (0); Honolulu, HI
March 5, 2021; 4:00 p.m., ESPN 3		UC Irvine	L 68–71 ^{OT}	5–10 (4–7)	17 – Washington	13 – Hunter	6 – Washington	Walter Pyramid (0); Long Beach, CA
March 6, 2021; 4:00 p.m., ESPN 3		UC Irvine	L 58–73	5–11 (4–8)	15 – Slater	6 – Jones	4 – Washington	Walter Pyramid (0); Long Beach, CA
Big West tournament
March 9, 2021; 3:00 p.m., ESPN3	(9)	(8) Cal State Northridge; First Round	W 85–63	6–11	19 – Jones	11 – Jones	4 – Washington	Michelob Ultra Arena; Paradise, NV
March 11, 2021; 11:00 a.m., ESPN3	(9)	(1) UC Santa Barbara; Quarterfinals	L 87–95	6–12	20 – Slater	9 – Washington	10 – Washington	Michelob Ultra Arena; Paradise, NV
*Non-conference game. ^{#}Rankings from AP Poll. (#) Tournament seedings in parentheses. All times are in Pacific Time Zone.
