= 2020–21 Cal State Fullerton Titans men's basketball team =

American college basketball team season

2020–21 Cal State Fullerton Titans men's basketball
- Conference: Big West Conference
- Record: 5–6 (4–6 Big West)
- Head coach: Dedrique Taylor (8th season)
- Associate head coach: Gus Argenal (2nd season)
- Assistant coaches: Brandon Dunson (2nd season); Anthony Santos (4th season)
- Home arena: Titan Gym (Capacity: 4,000)

2020–21 Big West men's basketball standings
	Conf.				Overall
Team	W		L	PCT	W		L	PCT
UC Santa Barbara †	13	–	3	.813	22	–	5	.815
UC Irvine	10	–	4	.714	18	–	9	.667
UC Riverside	8	–	4	.667	14	–	8	.636
UC Davis	6	–	4	.600	10	–	8	.556
Cal State Bakersfield	9	–	7	.563	15	–	11	.577
Hawai'i	9	–	9	.500	11	–	10	.524
Cal State Fullerton	5	–	7	.417	6	–	10	.375
Cal State Northridge	5	–	9	.357	9	–	13	.409
Long Beach State	4	–	8	.333	6	–	12	.333
Cal Poly	1	–	15	.063	4	–	20	.167
UC San Diego*	0	–	0	–	7	–	10	.412
† 2021 Big West tournament winner * ineligible for the 2021 NCAA tournament and 2021 Big West tournament due to transition period; Big West games not counted in standings

The 2020–21 Cal State Fullerton Titans men's basketball team represented California State University, Fullerton in the 2020–21 NCAA Division I men's basketball season. The Titans, led by eighth-year head coach Dedrique Taylor, played their home games at Titan Gym as members of the Big West Conference.

== Previous season ==
The Titans finished the 2019–20 season 11–20 overall, 6–10 in Big West Conference play to finish tied for 7th in the conference standings. A 7th seed in the Big West Conference tournament, the tournament was cancelled due to the COVID-19 pandemic, ending the Titans season.

== Roster ==
2020–21 Cal State Fullerton Titans men's basketball team
Players
Coaches

Pos.	#	Name	Height	Weight	Year	Previous school	Hometown
G	0	Jalen Harris	6 ft 1 in (1.85 m)	180 lb (82 kg)	Jr	Windward HS; Casper CC	Los Angeles, California
G	1	Christian McCray	6 ft 6 in (1.98 m)	170 lb (77 kg)	Jr	Oakl Hill Academy (VA); West Los Angeles CC	Plantation, Florida
G	2	Tray Maddox Jr.	6 ft 6 in (1.98 m)	200 lb (91 kg)	Jr	Novi HS; Oakland	Novi, Michigan
G	3	Latrell Wrightsell Jr.	6 ft 3 in (1.91 m)	189 lb (86 kg)	Fr	Omaha Central HS	Omaha, Nebraska
G/F	5	Landis Spivey	6 ft 5 in (1.96 m)	170 lb (77 kg)	Jr	Aspire Langston Hughes Academy; Columbia CC	Stockton, California
F	10	Jalon Andrews	6 ft 8 in (2.03 m)	220 lb (100 kg)	Jr	South Pike HS; Southwest Mississippi CC	Magnolia, Mississippi
G	11	Wayne Arnold	6 ft 4 in (1.93 m)	170 lb (77 kg)	Jr	Dominguez HS	South Central Los Angeles, California
G	12	Raul Torres	6 ft 1 in (1.85 m)	180 lb (82 kg)	So	Mater Dei HS	Santa Ana, California
F	13	Vincent Lee	6 ft 8 in (2.03 m)	230 lb (104 kg)	RS So	Midlothian HS (TX); Nevada	Midlothian, Texas
F	15	Doctor Bradley	6 ft 7 in (2.01 m)	185 lb (84 kg)	RS Fr	Junípero Serra HS	Gardena, California
G	21	Dante Maddox Jr.	6 ft 2 in (1.88 m)	195 lb (88 kg)	Fr	Bloom HS	Chicago Heights, Illinois
G	23	Tory San Antonio	6 ft 3 in (1.91 m)	165 lb (75 kg)	So	Rancho Verde HS	Moreno Valley, California
F	33	Josh Hall	6 ft 7 in (2.01 m)	213 lb (97 kg)	GS	Genesis Academy; Nevada; Missouri	Los Angeles, California
F	34	Johnny Yang	6 ft 9 in (2.06 m)	240 lb (109 kg)	Sr	Santa MArgarita Catholic HS	Beijing, China
G	35	Cameron Carter	6 ft 2 in (1.88 m)	180 lb (82 kg)	So	Damonte Ranch HS	Reno, Nevada

Head coach

- Dedrique Taylor (UC Davis)

Assistant coach(es)

- Gus Argenal (UC Davis)
  Associate Head Coach
- Brandon Dunson (Arizona State)
- Anthony Santos (Cal State Fullerton)

Support staff

- Rob Zewe (Pittsburgh)
  Director of Basketball
- Alex Lieu (Cal State Northridge)
  Support Staff
- Colin Kirk (Gonzaga)
  Support Staff
- Omari Prince
  Student Manager/Video Coordinator
- Quinton Adams
  Student Manager

Athletic trainer(s)

- Kyle Burnett (Pacific)
  Assistant Athletic Trainer

Legend

- (C) Team captain
- (S) Suspended
- (I) Ineligible
- (W) Walk-on
- Injured
- Current redshirt

Roster
Last update: December 7, 2020

== Schedule and results ==
Date time, TV	Rank^{#}	Opponent^{#}	Result	Record	High points	High rebounds	High assists	Site (attendance) city, state
Non-conference regular season
November 25, 2020*; 6:00 p.m.		at San Diego	Canceled due to COVID-19 issues					Jenny Craig Pavilion; San Diego, CA
December 13, 2020*; 12:00 p.m.		San Diego Christian	W 94–70	1–0	19 – Arnold	6 – Tied	5 – San Antonio	Titan Gym (0); Fullerton, CA
December 19, 2020*; 3:00 p.m.		Westmont	Canceled due to COVID-19 issues					Titan Gym; Fullerton, CA
Big West regular season
January 1, 2021; 5:00 p.m., ESPN3		at UC Santa Barbara	L 63–81	1–1 (0–1)	27 – T. Maddox Jr.	10 – Hall	3 – Wrightsell Jr.	The Thunderdome (0); Santa Barbara, CA
January 2, 2021; 5:00 p.m.		at UC Santa Barbara	L 61–65	1–2 (0–2)	19 – D. Maddox Jr.	9 – Hall	3 – D. Maddox Jr.	The Thunderdome (0); Santa Barbara, CA
January 8, 2021; 5:00 p.m.		Long Beach State	L 80–82	1–3 (0–3)	18 – T. Maddox Jr.	9 – Hall	5 – Hall	Titan Gym (0); Fullerton, CA
January 9, 2021; 5:00 p.m.		Long Beach State	W 75–72 ^{OT}	2–3 (1–3)	22 – T. Maddox Jr.	11 – Lee	4 – T. Maddox Jr.	Titan Gym (0); Fullerton, CA
January 15, 2021		at UC Davis	Postponed due to COVID-19 issues					The Pavilion; Davis, CA
January 16, 2021		at UC Davis	Postponed due to COVID-19 issues					The Pavilion; Davis, CA
January 16, 2021; 7:00 p.m., ESPN3		Cal State Northridge	L 85–86	2–4 (1–4)	21 – San Antonio	11 – Hall	3 – 3 tied	Titan Gym (0); Fullerton, CA
January 17, 2020		Cal State Northridge	W 85–77	3–4 (2–4)	25 – Lee	11 – Lee	4 – Hall	Titan Gym (0); Fullerton, CA
January 22, 2020; 5:00 p.m., ESPN3		Hawaii	W 83–67	4–4 (3–4)	23 – T. Maddox Jr.	6 – Lee	3 – Harris	Titan Gym (0); Fullerton, CA
January 23, 2021; 5:00 p.m., ESPN3		Hawaii	L 53–76	4–5 (3–5)	12 – T. Maddox Jr.	5 – Hall	4 – D. Maddox Jr.	Titan Gym (0); Fullerton, CA
January 29, 2021; 8:00 p.m., ESPNU		at Cal State Bakersfield	W 90–84	5–5 (4–5)	22 – D. Maddox Jr.	9 – Hall	3 – T. Maddox Jr.	Icardo Center; Bakersfield, CA
January 30, 2021; 7:00 p.m., ESPN3		at Cal State Bakersfield	L 73–83	5–6 (4–6)	15 – Tied (3)	6 – San Antonio	4 – Tied (2)	Icardo Center; Bakersfield, CA
February 5, 2021; 5:00 p.m.		UC Riverside	Canceled due to COVID-19 issues					Titan Gym; Fullerton, CA
February 6, 2021; 5:00 p.m.		UC Riverside	Canceled due to COVID-19 issues					Titan Gym; Fullerton, CA
February 12, 2021; 4:00 p.m.		at Cal Poly	Canceled due to COVID-19 issues					Mott Athletics Center; San Luis Obispo, CA
February 13, 2021; 4:00 p.m.		at Cal Poly	Canceled due to COVID-19 issues					Mott Athletics Center; San Luis Obispo, CA
February 19, 2021; 5:00 p.m.		UC Irvine	L 78-89	5–7 (4–7)	– –	– –	– –	Titan Gym; Fullerton, CA
February 20, 2021; 5:00 p.m.		UC Irvine	W 67-64	6–7 (5–7)	– –	– –	– –	Titan Gym; Fullerton, CA
March 5, 2021; 5:00 p.m., ESPN3		at UC San Diego	L 85-89	6–8	– –	– –	– –	RIMAC Arena; La Jolla, CA
March 6, 2021; 5:00 p.m., ESPN3		at UC San Diego	L 78-85	6–9	– –	– –	– –	RIMAC Arena; La Jolla, CA
*Non-conference game. ^{#}Rankings from AP Poll. (#) Tournament seedings in parentheses. All times are in Pacific Time Zone.
