= 2020–21 UC Davis Aggies men's basketball team =

American college basketball season

2020–21 UC Davis Aggies men's basketball
- Conference: Big West Conference
- Record: 10–8 (6–4 Big West)
- Head coach: Jim Les (10th season)
- Associate head coach: Kyle Nosek (19th season)
- Assistant coaches: Kyle Vogt (9th season); Jonathan Metzger-Jones (5th season)
- Home arena: The Pavilion

2020–21 Big West men's basketball standings
	Conf.				Overall
Team	W		L	PCT	W		L	PCT
UC Santa Barbara †	13	–	3	.813	22	–	5	.815
UC Irvine	10	–	4	.714	18	–	9	.667
UC Riverside	8	–	4	.667	14	–	8	.636
UC Davis	6	–	4	.600	10	–	8	.556
Cal State Bakersfield	9	–	7	.563	15	–	11	.577
Hawai'i	9	–	9	.500	11	–	10	.524
Cal State Fullerton	5	–	7	.417	6	–	10	.375
Cal State Northridge	5	–	9	.357	9	–	13	.409
Long Beach State	4	–	8	.333	6	–	12	.333
Cal Poly	1	–	15	.063	4	–	20	.167
UC San Diego*	0	–	0	–	7	–	10	.412
† 2021 Big West tournament winner * ineligible for the 2021 NCAA tournament and 2021 Big West tournament due to transition period; Big West games not counted in standings

The 2020–21 UC Davis Aggies men's basketball team represented the University of California, Davis in the 2020–21 NCAA Division I men's basketball season. The Aggies, led by Jim Les in his tenth season with the program, played their games at The Pavilion in Davis, California as members of the Big West Conference.

== Previous season ==
The Aggies finished the 2019–20 season 14–18 overall, 8–8 in Big West play, to finish tied for fourth in the Big West standings. Initially set to play Hawaii in the first round of the Big West Conference tournament, the tournament was cancelled due to the COVID-19 pandemic, ending the Aggies' season.

== Roster ==
2020–21 UC Davis Aggies men's basketball team
Players
Coaches

Pos.	#	Name	Height	Weight	Year	Previous school	Hometown
G	1	Damion Squire	6 ft 0 in (1.83 m)	185 lb (84 kg)	Jr	Wasatch Academy	Montreal, QC
F	2	Caleb McGill	6 ft 7 in (2.01 m)	215 lb (98 kg)	Fr	Grandview HS (CO)	Aurora, CO
F	3	Aaron Murray	6 ft 6 in (1.98 m)	220 lb (100 kg)	RS Fr	Modesto Christian School	Modesto, CA
F	4	Christian Anigwe	6 ft 9 in (2.06 m)	220 lb (100 kg)	Jr	Desert Vista HS; San Jose State	Phoenix, AZ
G	5	Ezra Manjon	5 ft 11 in (1.8 m)	170 lb (77 kg)	So	Heritage HS (CA)	Antioch, CA
F	10	Kennedy Koehler	6 ft 7 in (2.01 m)	220 lb (100 kg)	Sr	Coronado HS (NV); Pima CC	Las Vegas, NV
G	11	Caleb Fuller	6 ft 5 in (1.96 m)	210 lb (95 kg)	Jr	Barking Abbey School	Ipswich, England
G	15	Ran Pehka	6 ft 3 in (1.91 m)	185 lb (84 kg)	Fr	Tallinn Audentes Sports Gymnasium	Tallinn, Estonia
G	20	B.J. Shaw	6 ft 6 in (1.98 m)	195 lb (88 kg)	So	Bishop O'Dowd HS	Oakland, CA
G	22	Noah Haynesworth	6 ft 2 in (1.88 m)	190 lb (86 kg)	Jr	Tamalpais HS; Skyline CC	Mill Valley, CA
G	24	Ade Adebayo	6 ft 4 in (1.93 m)	200 lb (91 kg)	Jr	Barking Abbey School	London, England
G	30	Cameron Ba	6 ft 3 in (1.91 m)	180 lb (82 kg)	So	St. Joseph Notre Dame HS	Alameda, CA
F	34	Hugh Hogland	6 ft 10 in (2.08 m)	230 lb (104 kg)	GS	ʻIolani School; Portland	Waimānalo, HI
G	40	Elijah Pepper	6 ft 4 in (1.93 m)	200 lb (91 kg)	So	Selah HS	Selah, WA
F	55	Francesco Borra	6 ft 11 in (2.11 m)	250 lb (113 kg)	Fr	JSerra Catholic HS	Moncalieri, Italy

Head coach

- Jim Les (Bradley)

Assistant coach(es)

- Kevin Nosek (UC Davis)
  Associate head coach
- Kyle Vogt (Lakeland)
- Jonathan Metzger-Jones (Pacific)

Support staff

- Ryan Oliver (Siena)
  Director of operations
- Darik Artis (Ohio State)
  Video coordinator
- Luis Reyes (Cal Poly)
  Operations & video assistant

Strength and conditioning coach(es)

- Charles Young (Western Michigan)
  Associate strength and conditioning coach

Athletic trainer(s)

- Samm Brockel (San Francisco State)
  Assistant athletic trainer

Legend

- (C) Team captain
- (S) Suspended
- (I) Ineligible
- (W) Walk-on
- Injured
- Current redshirt

Roster
Last update: December 3, 2020

== Schedule and results ==
Date time, TV	Rank^{#}	Opponent^{#}	Result	Record	High points	High rebounds	High assists	Site (attendance) city, state
Regular season
November 25, 2020*; 7:00 p.m.		vs. Nicholls; Bronco Invitational	L 93–101	0–1	25 – Manjon	5 – Koehler	5 – tied	Leavey Center; Santa Clara, CA
November 27, 2020*; 1:00 p.m., WCC Network		at Santa Clara; Bronco Invitational	L 63–66	0–2	21 – Manjon	9 – Pepper	4 – Manjon	Leavey Center; Santa Clara, CA
November 28, 2020*; 7:00 p.m.		vs. Idaho State; Bronco Invitational	W 70–61	1–2	23 – Manjon	6 – Pepper	3 – Manjon	Leavey Center; Santa Clara, CA
December 4, 2020*; 4:00 p.m., BigWest.TV		William Jessup	W 95–62	2–2	16 – tied	6 – Koehler	3 – tied	The Pavilion; Davis, CA
December 8, 2020*; 1:30 p.m.		at Cal Baptist	Canceled due to positive COVID-19 Yolo County restrictions					CBU Events Center; Riverside, CA
December 12, 2020*; 3:00 p.m., WCC Network		at Pacific	Canceled due to positive COVID-19 Yolo County restrictions					Alex G. Spanos Center; Stockton, CA
December 19, 2020*; 12:05 p.m., Pluto TV		at Sacramento State	Canceled due to positive COVID-19 Yolo County restrictions					Hornets Nest; Sacramento, CA
December 27, 2020; ESPN3		at Cal State Bakersfield	Canceled due to positive COVID-19 Yolo County restrictions					Icardo Center; Bakersfield, CA
December 28, 2020; ESPN3		at Cal State Bakersfield	Canceled due to positive COVID-19 Yolo County restrictions					Icardo Center; Bakersfield, CA
January 1, 2021; BigWest.TV		UC Riverside	Canceled due to positive COVID-19 Yolo County restrictions					The Pavilion; Davis, CA
January 2, 2021; BigWest.TV		UC Riverside	Canceled due to positive COVID-19 Yolo County restrictions					The Pavilion; Davis, CA
January 8, 2021; BigWest.TV		at UC Irvine	Canceled due to positive COVID-19 Yolo County restrictions					Bren Events Center; Irvine, CA
January 9, 2021; BigWest.TV		at UC Irvine	Canceled due to positive COVID-19 Yolo County restrictions					Bren Events Center; Irvine, CA
January 15, 2021; BigWest.TV		Cal State Fullerton	Canceled due to positive COVID-19 Yolo County restrictions					The Pavilion; Davis, CA
January 16, 2021; BigWest.TV		Cal State Fullerton	Canceled due to positive COVID-19 Yolo County restrictions					The Pavilion; Davis, CA
January 22, 2021*; 4:00 p.m., ESPN3		at UC San Diego	L 69–89	2–3	19 – Squire	8 – Anigwe	4 – Squire	RIMAC Arena; La Jolla, CA
January 23, 2021*; 2:00 p.m., ESPN3		at UC San Diego	W 78–71	3–3	20 – Pepper	6 – Koehler	6 – tied	RIMAC Arena; La Jolla, CA
January 29, 2021; 4:00 p.m., BigWest.TV		UC Santa Barbara	L 51–72	3–4 (0–1)	14 – Squire	9 – Shaw	2 – tied	The Pavilion; Davis, CA
January 30, 2021; 4:00 p.m., BigWest.TV		UC Santa Barbara	L 86–89 ^{OT}	3–5 (0–2)	23 – Pepper	8 – Pepper	4 – Manjon	The Pavilion; Davis, CA
February 5, 2021; 4:00 p.m., ESPN3		at Cal State Northridge	L 77–80	3–6 (0–3)	30 – Fuller	6 – tied	3 – Manjon	Matadome; Northridge, CA
February 6, 2021; 2:00 p.m., BigWest.TV		at Cal State Northridge	W 75–63	4–6 (1–3)	18 – Pepper	10 – Koehler	6 – Koehler	Matadome; Northridge, CA
February 12, 2021; 3:00 p.m., BigWest.TV		Long Beach State	W 68–66	5–6 (2–3)	19 – Manjon	9 – Anigwe	6 – Manjon	The Pavilion; Davis, CA
February 13, 2021; 1:00 p.m., BigWest.TV		Long Beach State	W 78–76 ^{OT}	6–6 (3–3)	32 – Pepper	9 – Fuller	3 – Manjon	The Pavilion; Davis, CA
February 26, 2021; 2:00 p.m., BigWest.TV		at Cal Poly	W 69–61	7–6 (4–3)	14 – Squire	6 – Anigwe	3 – Manjon	Mott Athletics Center; San Luis Obispo, CA
February 27, 2021; 2:00 p.m., BigWest.TV		at Cal Poly	W 68–66 ^{OT}	8–6 (5–3)	20 – Manjon	9 – Koehler	2 – tied	Mott Athletics Center; San Luis Obispo, CA
March 5, 2021; 4:00 p.m., BigWest.TV		Hawaii	L 68–73	8–7 (5–4)	19 – Pepper	7 – Koehler	3 – tied	The Pavilion; Davis, CA
March 6, 2021; 4:00 p.m., BigWest.TV		Hawaii	W 74–66	9–7 (6–4)	16 – Manjon	11 – Pepper	4 – Manjon	The Pavilion; Davis, CA
Big West tournament
March 11, 2021; 2:00 p.m., ESPN3	(4)	vs. (5) Cal State Bakersfield; Quarterfinals	W 58–56	10–7	16 – Manjon	4 – tied	4 – Squire	Michelob Ultra Arena; Paradise, NV
March 12, 2021; 6:00 p.m., ESPN3	(4)	vs. (1) UC Santa Barbara; Semifinals	L 55–71	10–8	15 – Anigwe	8 – Anigwe	4 – Manjon	Michelob Ultra Arena; Paradise, NV
*Non-conference game. ^{#}Rankings from AP poll. (#) Tournament seedings in parentheses. All times are in Pacific.
