= 2019–20 Long Beach State Beach men's basketball team =

American college basketball season

2019–20 Long Beach State Beach men's basketball
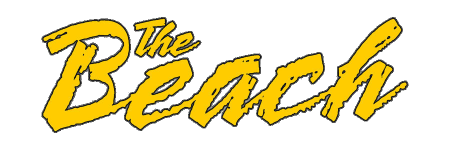
- Conference: Big West Conference
- Record: 11–21 (6–10 Big West)
- Head coach: Dan Monson (13th season)
- Assistant coaches: Myke Scholl; Senque Carey; Bobby Braswell
- Home arena: Walter Pyramid (Capacity: 4,200)

2019–20 Big West men's basketball standings
	Conf.				Overall
Team	W		L	PCT	W		L	PCT
UC Irvine	13	–	3	.813	21	–	11	.656
Cal State Northridge	10	–	6	.625	15	–	17	.469
UC Santa Barbara	10	–	6	.625	21	–	10	.677
Hawai'i	8	–	8	.500	17	–	13	.567
UC Davis	8	–	8	.500	14	–	18	.438
UC Riverside	7	–	9	.438	17	–	15	.531
Cal State Fullerton	6	–	10	.375	11	–	20	.355
Long Beach State	6	–	10	.375	11	–	21	.344
Cal Poly	4	–	12	.250	7	–	23	.233
Note: The 2020 Big West tournament was canceled due to the COVID-19 pandemic.

The 2019–20 Long Beach State Beach men's basketball team represented California State University, Long Beach in the 2019–20 NCAA Division I men's basketball season. The Beach were led by thirteenth-year head coach Dan Monson and played their home games at the Walter Pyramid as members of the Big West Conference. They finished the season 11–21, 6–10 in Big West play to finish in a tie for seventh place. They were set to be the No. 8 seed in the Big West tournament. However, the Big West tournament was canceled amid the COVID-19 pandemic.

The 2019–20 season was the first for their athletics' program's new nickname, Beach. They had previously been known as the 49ers through 2018–19.

== Previous season ==
Long Beach State finished the 2018–19 season 15–19 overall, and 8–8 in conference play. They lost in the second round of the Big West Conference tournament in Anaheim, having defeated 4th-seeded Hawaii in the first round before losing to top seed UC Irvine 67–75, ending their season.

== Roster ==
2019–20 Long Beach State Beach men's basketball team
Players
Coaches

Pos.	#	Name	Height	Weight	Year	Previous school	Hometown
G	0	RJ Rhoden	6 ft 3 in (1.91 m)	195 lb (88 kg)	Fr	Mainland HS	Daytona Beach, Florida
G	1	Michael Carter III	6 ft 5 in (1.96 m)	175 lb (79 kg)	So	Washington	Seattle, Washington
G/F	2	Jordan Roberts	6 ft 9 in (2.06 m)	200 lb (91 kg)	Jr	Ridgeview HS	Bakersfield, California
G	3	Drew Cobb	6 ft 4 in (1.93 m)	205 lb (93 kg)	Jr	Fresno City College	Sacramento, California
G	4	Justin Rene	6 ft 3 in (1.91 m)	175 lb (79 kg)	Fr	Long Beach Poly HS	Long Beach, California
G	10	Max De Geest	6 ft 3 in (1.91 m)	185 lb (84 kg)	Fr	Christ's College	Oamaru, New Zealand
G	11	Jordan Griffin	6 ft 3 in (1.91 m)	165 lb (75 kg)	Sr	Centennial HS	Corona, California
F	12	Breyon Jackson	6 ft 8 in (2.03 m)	215 lb (98 kg)	Jr	Cloud Country CC	Washington, D.C.
F	13	Romelle Mansel	6 ft 9 in (2.06 m)	230 lb (104 kg)	Fr	St. Bernard HS	Playa del Rey, California
G	14	Colin Slater	6 ft 1 in (1.85 m)	175 lb (79 kg)	Jr	Tulane	New Orleans, Louisiana
C	23	Jeffrey Yan	6 ft 9 in (2.06 m)	275 lb (125 kg)	RS Fr	Capistrano Valley Christian School	Shanghai, China
C	24	Joshua Morgan	6 ft 11 in (2.11 m)	195 lb (88 kg)	Fr	Sheldon HS	Sacramento, California
G	31	Chance Hunter	6 ft 6 in (1.98 m)	190 lb (86 kg)	So	Cerritos CC	Inglewood, California
C	32	Trever Irish	7 ft 0 in (2.13 m)	185 lb (84 kg)	So	Central Arizona CC	Lewiston, Maine
C	35	Milos Apic	6 ft 10 in (2.08 m)	200 lb (91 kg)	RS So	Sandy Spring Friends School	Novi Sad, Serbia

Head coach

- Dan Monson (Idaho)

Assistant coach(es)

- Myke Scholl (Loyola Marymount)
- Senque Carey (New Mexico)
- Bobby Braswell (Cal State Northridge)

Legend

- (C) Team captain
- (S) Suspended
- (I) Ineligible
- (W) Walk-on
- Injured
- Current redshirt

Roster
Last update: 22 Nov 2019

== Schedule ==
Date time, TV	Rank^{#}	Opponent^{#}	Result	Record	High points	High rebounds	High assists	Site (attendance) city, state
Non-conference regular season
November 6, 2019*; 8:00 pm, P12N		at UCLA	L 65–69	0–1	20 – Carter III	7 – Morgan	3 – Carter III	Pauley Pavilion (6,265); Los Angeles, CA
November 9, 2019*; 3:30 pm		San Diego	W 74–62	1–1	21 – Hunter	9 – Hunter	2 – Tied	Walter Pyramid (3,548); Long Beach, CA
November 12, 2019*; 6:00 pm, P12N		at Stanford	L 58–86	1–2	13 – De Geest	6 – Tied	3 – Morgan	Maples Pavilion (2,558); Stanford, CA
November 14, 2019*; 7:00 pm		at No. 18 Saint Mary's	L 63–81	1–3	14 – Slater	5 – Morgan	3 – Carter III	University Credit Union Pavilion (2,715); Moraga, CA
November 22, 2019*; 7:00 pm		Fresno Pacific	W 93–62	2–3	21 – Hunter	8 – Cobb	6 – Carter III	Walter Pyramid (1,829); Long Beach, CA
November 24, 2019*; 5:30 pm, P12N		at No. 14 Arizona; Wooden Legacy campus-site game	L 67–104	2–4	11 – Carter III	5 – Tied	2 – Tied	McKale Center (12,943); Tucson, AZ
November 28, 2019*; 11:00 am, ESPNU		vs. Providence; Wooden Legacy quarterfinals	W 66–65	3–4	23 – Carter III	9 – Morgan	5 – Cobb	Anaheim Arena; Anaheim, CA
November 29, 2019*; 11:00 am, ESPN2		vs. Wake Forest; Wooden Legacy semifinals	L 75–88	3–5	18 – Carter III	7 – Morgan	9 – Carter III	Anaheim Arena; Anaheim, CA
December 1, 2019*; 10:30 am, ESPN2		vs. Penn; Wooden Legacy 3rd place game	L 79–95	3–6	24 – Hunter	8 – Carter III	4 – Carter III	Anaheim Arena; Anaheim, CA
December 7, 2019*; 4:00 pm		Pacific	L 46–65	3–7	20 – Slater	6 – Morgan	1 – Tied	Walter Pyramid (2,695); Long Beach, CA
December 15, 2019*; 3:30 pm, P12N		at USC	L 76–87	3–8	18 – Hunter	8 – Rbberts	3 – 3 tied	Galen Center (4,275); Los Angeles, CA
December 19, 2019*; 7:00 pm		Southern Utah	L 63–84	3–9	13 – Carter III	5 – Tied	5 – De Geest	Walter Pyramid (1,336); Long Beach, CA
December 21, 2019*; 4:00 pm		Utah Valley	W 68–65	4–9	15 – Tied	9 – Hunter	3 – Tied	Walter Pyramid (1,386); Long Beach, CA
December 23, 2019*; 3:00 pm		at Seattle	L 57–79	4–10	11 – Morgan	6 – Hunter	3 – Tied	Redhawk Center (940); Seattle, WA
December 28, 2019*; 9:00 am, SECN		at Florida	L 63–102	4–11	20 – Hunter	7 – Morgan	3 – Slater	O'Connell Center (9,067); Gainesville, FL
January 4, 2019*; 4:30 pm		Cal State Los Angeles	W 76–60	5–11	18 – Slater	18 – Carter III	4 – Carter III	Walter Pyramid (1,646); Long Beach, CA
Big West regular season
January 8, 2020; 7:00 pm, ESPN3		at Cal State Northridge	L 77–95	5–12 (0–1)	19 – Carter III	6 – Hunter	3 – Carter III	Matadome (635); Northridge, CA
January 11, 2020; 7:00 pm		at UC Santa Barbara	W 55–52	6–12 (1–1)	16 – Hunter	7 – Morgan	6 – Carter III	The Thunderdome (1,753); Santa Barbara, CA
January 16, 2020; 7:00 pm, ESPN3		UC Davis	L 82–85	6–13 (1–2)	28 – Hunter	14 – Morgan	4 – Morgan	Walter Pyramid (1,553); Long Beach, CA
January 18, 2020; 7:00 pm		Cal State Fullerton	L 62–66	6–14 (1–3)	19 – Slater	7 – 3 tied	3 – Slater	Walter Pyramid (2,179); Long Beach, CA
January 22, 2020; 7:00 p.m., ESPN3		UC Irvine	W 63–56	7–14 (2–3)	19 – Slater	6 – Morgan	3 – Slater	Walter Pyramid (2,262); Long Beach, CA
January 30, 2020; 7:00 pm, ESPN3		at UC Riverside	L 69–77	7–15 (2–4)	20 – Hunter	8 – Hunter	3 – Morgan	SRC Arena (923); Riverside, CA
February 1, 2020; 4:00 pm, ESPN3		UC Santa Barbara	L 62–87	7–16 (2–5)	19 – Hunter	8 – Hunter	4 – Cobb	Walter Pyramid (1,829); Long Beach, CA
February 5, 2020; 7:00 pm		at Cal Poly	L 75–92	7–17 (2–6)	15 – Tied	7 – Mansel	3 – Tied	Mott Athletics Center (1,562); San Luis Obispo, CA
February 12, 2020; 9:00 pm		at Hawaii	W 50–49	8–17 (3–6)	11 – Morgan	7 – Mansel	3 – Carter III	Stan Sheriff Center (5,588); Honolulu, HI
February 15, 2020; 4:00 pm, ESPN3		UC Riverside	W 65–63 ^{OT}	9–17 (4–6)	17 – Morgan	8 – Tied	5 – Cobb	Walter Pyramid (1,626); Long Beach, CA
February 19, 2020; 7:00 pm, ESPN3		at UC Irvine	L 55–70	9–18 (4–7)	16 – Carter III	10 – Roberts	3 – Cobb	Bren Events Center (2,312); Irvine, CA
February 22, 2020; 4:00 pm, ESPN3		Hawaii	W 64–60	10–18 (5–7)	15 – Carter III	7 – Roberts	3 – Tied	Walter Pyramid (2,100); Long Beach, CA
February 26, 2020; 7:00 p.m., ESPN3		Cal State Northridge	L 64–73	10–19 (5–8)	11 – De Geest	7 – Morgan	3 – Tied	Walter Pyramid (1,816); Long Beach, CA
February 29, 2020; 7:00 p.m.		at UC Davis	L 76–77	10–20 (5–9)	25 – Hunter	8 – Hunter	5 – Cobb	The Pavilion (2,377); Davis, CA
March 5, 2020; 7:00 pm, ESPN3		Cal Poly	W 80–73 ^{OT}	11–20 (6–9)	18 – Griffin	10 – Morgan	4 – Carter III	Walter Pyramid (1,641); Long Beach, CA
March 7, 2020; 7:30 pm, ESPN3		at Cal State Fullerton	L 69–75	11–21 (6–10)	21 – Carter III	9 – Morgan	3 – Tied	Titan Gym (1,821); Fullerton, CA
Big West tournament
March 12, 2020; 6:00 pm, ESPN3	(8)	vs. (1) UC Irvine; Quarterfinals	Cancelled due to the COVID-19 pandemic					Honda Center; Anaheim, CA
*Non-conference game. ^{#}Rankings from AP Poll. (#) Tournament seedings in parentheses. All times are in Pacific.
