= 2019–20 Stanford Cardinal men's basketball team =

American college basketball season

2019–20 Stanford Cardinal men's basketball
- Conference: Pac-12 Conference
- Record: 20–12 (9–9 Pac-12)
- Head coach: Jerod Haase (4th season)
- Assistant coaches: Jeff Wulbrun; Adam Cohen; Jesse Pruitt
- Home arena: Maples Pavilion

2019–20 Pac-12 Conference men's basketball standings
	Conf.				Overall
Team	W		L	PCT	W		L	PCT
No. 13 Oregon	13	–	5	.722	24	–	7	.774
UCLA	12	–	6	.667	19	–	12	.613
USC	11	–	7	.611	22	–	9	.710
Arizona State	11	–	7	.611	20	–	11	.645
Arizona	10	–	8	.556	21	–	11	.656
Colorado	10	–	8	.556	21	–	11	.656
Stanford	9	–	9	.500	20	–	12	.625
Oregon State	7	–	11	.389	18	–	13	.581
Utah	7	–	11	.389	16	–	15	.516
California	7	–	11	.389	14	–	18	.438
Washington State	6	–	12	.333	16	–	16	.500
Washington	5	–	13	.278	15	–	17	.469
Note: The 2020 Pac-12 Tournament was canceled prior to the quarterfinals due to the COVID-19 pandemic. Rankings from AP poll

The 2019–20 Stanford Cardinal men's basketball team represented Stanford University during the 2019–20 NCAA Division I men's basketball season. The Cardinal were led by fourth-year head coach Jerod Haase and played their home games at Maples Pavilion as a member of the Pac-12 Conference. They finished the season 20–12, 9–9 in Pac-12 play to finish in seventh place. They lost in the first round of the Pac-12 tournament to California.

== Previous season ==
The Cardinal finished the 2018–19 season 15–16, 8–10 in Pac-12 play to finish in a three-way tie for eighth place, losing the tie-breakers against Arizona and USC ultimately finishing in tenth place. They lost in the first round of the Pac-12 tournament to the seven seed UCLA 79–72, finishing their year.

== Offseason ==
=== Departures ===
Name	Pos.	Height	Weight	Year	Hometown	Reason for departure
Josh Sharma	C	7'0"	230	Senior	Lexington, MA	Graduated
KZ Okpala	F	6'8"	215	Sophomore	Placentia, CA	Declared for the NBA draft; selected 32nd overall by the Phoenix Suns.
Marcus Sheffield	G/F	6'5"	180	RS Junior	Alpharetta, GA	Graduate transferred to Elon
Trevor Stanback	C	6'11"	225	RS Junior	Pasadena, CA	Retired, assumed position as student assistant coach
Cormac Ryan	G	6'5"	190	Freshman	New York City, NY	Transferred to Notre Dame

=== 2019 recruiting class ===
College recruiting information
Name	Hometown	School	Height	Weight	Commit date
Tyrell Terry; PG	Minneapolis, MN	DeLaSalle (MN)	6 ft 3 in (1.91 m)	180 lb (82 kg)	Jun 10, 2018
Tyrell Terry; PG	Recruit ratings: Scout: Rivals: 247Sports: ESPN:				
Spencer Jones; SF	Roeland Park, KS	Bishop Miege (KS)	6 ft 7 in (2.01 m)	195 lb (88 kg)	May 16, 2019
Spencer Jones; SF	Recruit ratings: Scout: Rivals: 247Sports: ESPN:				
James Keefe; SF	Los Angeles, CA	Loyola (CA)	6 ft 9 in (2.06 m)	210 lb (95 kg)	Oct 17, 2018
James Keefe; SF	Recruit ratings: Scout: Rivals: 247Sports: ESPN:				
Overall recruit ranking:
Note: In many cases, Scout, Rivals, 247Sports, On3, and ESPN may conflict in their listings of height and weight.; In these cases, the average was taken. ESPN grades are on a 100-point scale.; Sources: "2019 Stanford Commits". Rivals.; "2019 Team Ranking". Rivals.

=== 2020 Recruiting class ===
College recruiting information (2020)
Name	Hometown	School	Height	Weight	Commit date
Max Murrell; PF	Omaha, NE	Millard North (NE)	6 ft 9 in (2.06 m)	195 lb (88 kg)	Sep 9, 2019
Max Murrell; PF	Recruit ratings: Rivals: 247Sports: ESPN: (79)				
Brandon Angel; SF	San Diego, CA	Torrey Pines (CA)	6 ft 8 in (2.03 m)	200 lb (91 kg)	Sep 30, 2019
Brandon Angel; SF	Recruit ratings: Rivals: 247Sports: ESPN: (75)				
Noah Taitz; SG	Las Vegas, NV	Bishop Gorman (NV)	6 ft 3 in (1.91 m)	175 lb (79 kg)	Oct 5, 2019
Noah Taitz; SG	Recruit ratings: Rivals: 247Sports: ESPN: (81)				
Ziaire Williams; SF	Lancaster, CA	Sierra Canyon (CA)	6 ft 8 in (2.03 m)	180 lb (82 kg)	Apr 12, 2020
Ziaire Williams; SF	Recruit ratings: Rivals: 247Sports: ESPN: (95)				
Michael O'Connell; PG	Mineola, NY	Blair Academy (NJ)	6 ft 2 in (1.88 m)	175 lb (79 kg)	Jun 1, 2020
Michael O'Connell; PG	Recruit ratings: Rivals: 247Sports:				
Overall recruit ranking: Rivals: 15 247Sports: 11 ESPN: 10
Note: In many cases, Scout, Rivals, 247Sports, On3, and ESPN may conflict in their listings of height and weight.; In these cases, the average was taken. ESPN grades are on a 100-point scale.; Sources: "Stanford 2020 Basketball Commitments". Rivals.; "2020 Stanford Cardinal Recruiting Class". ESPN.; "2020 Team Ranking". Rivals.

== Roster ==
2019–20 Stanford Cardinal men's basketball team
Players
Coaches

Pos.	#	Name	Height	Weight	Year	Previous school	Hometown
G	1	Daejon Davis	6 ft 3 in (1.91 m)	185 lb (84 kg)	Jr	Garfield	Seattle, WA
G	2	Bryce Wills	6 ft 6 in (1.98 m)	195 lb (88 kg)	So	Iona Preparatory School	White Plains, NY
G	3	Tyrell Terry	6 ft 2 in (1.88 m)	160 lb (73 kg)	Fr	DeLaSalle	Minneapolis, MN
G	4	Isaac White	6 ft 2 in (1.88 m)	180 lb (82 kg)	Jr	Sacred Heart College	Adelaide, Australia
F	5	Kodye Pugh (injured)	6 ft 8 in (2.03 m)	205 lb (93 kg)	RS Jr	Blair Academy	Baltimore, MD
F	11	Jaiden Delaire	6 ft 9 in (2.06 m)	200 lb (91 kg)	So	Loomis Chaffee School	North Granby, CT
C	12	Keenan Fitzmorris	7 ft 0 in (2.13 m)	210 lb (95 kg)	RS Fr	New Hampton School	Overland Park, KS
F	13	Oscar da Silva	6 ft 9 in (2.06 m)	225 lb (102 kg)	Jr	Ludwig Gymnasium	Munich, Germany
F	14	Spencer Jones	6 ft 7 in (2.01 m)	195 lb (88 kg)	Fr	Bishop Miege	Roeland Park, KS
G	15	Rodney Herenton	6 ft 1 in (1.85 m)	185 lb (84 kg)	Sr	Stevenson	Chicago, IL
G	21	Daniel Begovich (W)	6 ft 5 in (1.96 m)	200 lb (91 kg)	Jr	St. Ignatius College Prep	San Francisco, CA
F	22	James Keefe	6 ft 9 in (2.06 m)	220 lb (100 kg)	Fr	Loyola	Los Angeles, CA
F	23	Neal Begovich (W)	6 ft 9 in (2.06 m)	220 lb (100 kg)	Fr	St. Ignatius College Prep	San Francisco, CA
G	24	Sam Beskind	6 ft 4 in (1.93 m)	193 lb (88 kg)	RS Fr	Catalina Foothills	Tucson, AZ
C	32	Lukas Kišūnas	6 ft 10 in (2.08 m)	245 lb (111 kg)	So	Brewster Academy	Vilnius, Lithuania

Head coach

- Jerod Haase (Kansas)

Assistant coach(es)

- Jeff Wulbrun (Cal State Fullerton)
- Adam Cohen (Arizona)
- Jesse Pruitt (UC Davis)

Legend

- (C) Team captain
- (S) Suspended
- (I) Ineligible
- (W) Walk-on
- Injured
- Current redshirt

Roster

- Kodye Pugh will miss the entire 2019–20 season due to injury received on August 25 against SAM Basket Massagno.
- Trevor Stanback has retired from basketball, but will remain with the team as a student assistant coach.

== Schedule and results ==
Date time, TV	Rank^{#}	Opponent^{#}	Result	Record	High points	High rebounds	High assists	Site (attendance) city, state
Exhibition
November 1, 2019*; 7:00 pm		Sonoma State	Cancelled					Maples Pavilion; Stanford, CA
Non-conference regular season
November 6, 2019*; 7:00 pm, P12N		Montana	W 73–62	1–0	21 – da Silva	4 – Tied	4 – Tied	Maples Pavilion; Stanford, CA
November 9, 2019*; 8:00 pm, P12N		Cal State Fullerton	W 70–54	2–0	14 – Tied	7 – Wills	5 – Wills	Maples Pavilion (2,756); Stanford, CA
November 12, 2019*; 6:00 pm, P12N		Long Beach State	W 86–58	3–0	14 – Tied	7 – Tied	6 – Terry	Maples Pavilion (2,558); Stanford, CA
November 16, 2019*; 7:00 pm, P12N		Santa Clara	W 82–64	4–0	21 – Terry	10 – Tied	4 – da Silva	Maples Pavilion (3,491); Stanford, CA
November 19, 2019*; 7:00 pm, P12N		Maryland Eastern Shore; Hall of Fame Classic campus-site game	W 76–55	5–0	21 – Delaire	6 – Wills	4 – Davis	Maples Pavilion (2,173); Stanford, CA
November 22, 2019*; 7:00 pm, P12N		William & Mary; Hall of Fame Classic campus-site game	W 81–50	6–0	21 – Terry	10 – Terry	4 – Davis	Maples Pavilion (2,502); Stanford, CA
November 25, 2019*; 6:30 pm, ESPN2		vs. Oklahoma; Hall of Fame Classic semifinals	W 73–54	7–0	20 – Terry	11 – Tied	4 – Davis	Sprint Center (8,963); Kansas City, MO
November 26, 2019*; 6:30 pm, ESPN2		vs. Butler; Hall of Fame Classic championship	L 67–68	7–1	21 – Terry	4 – Terry	6 – Davis	Sprint Center (8,506); Kansas City, MO
December 1, 2019*; 1:00 pm, P12N		UNC Wilmington	W 72–54	8–1	26 – da Silva	7 – Jones	5 – Tied	Maples Pavilion (3,298); Stanford, CA
December 14, 2019*; 4:00 pm, CBSSN		at San Jose State	W 78–58	9–1	25 – da Silva	8 – Tied	5 – Terry	Provident Credit Union Event Center (2,898); San Jose, CA
December 17, 2019*; 6:00 pm, P12N		San Francisco	W 64–56	10–1	18 – Tied	5 – Tied	4 – Davis	Maples Pavilion (3,303); Stanford, CA
December 21, 2019*; 12:00 pm, P12N		vs. San Diego; Al Attles Classic	W 62–59	11–1	20 – Terry	11 – da Silva	4 – Davis	Chase Center (3,586); San Francisco, CA
December 29, 2019*; 12:00 pm, ABC		No. 5 Kansas	L 56–72	11–2	19 – da Silva	4 – Tied	3 – Tied	Maples Pavilion (6,582); Stanford, CA
Pac-12 Regular season
January 2, 2020; 8:00 pm, ESPN2		California	W 68–52	12–2 (1–0)	20 – Davis	6 – Davis	5 – Davis	Maples Pavilion (3,691); Stanford, CA
January 9, 2020; 6:00 pm, FS1		Washington	W 61–55	13–2 (2–0)	14 – Jones	9 – Terry	6 – Terry	Maples Pavilion (5,328); Stanford, CA
January 11, 2020; 3:00 pm, P12N		Washington State	W 88–62	14–2 (3–0)	22 – Terry	6 – Terry	5 – Wills	Maples Pavilion (3,526); Stanford, CA
January 15, 2020; 7:00 pm, P12N		at UCLA	W 74–59	15–2 (4–0)	24 – Terry	6 – Wills	5 – Davis	Pauley Pavilion (5,148); Los Angeles, CA
January 18, 2020; 3:30 pm, P12N		at USC	L 78–82 ^{OT}	15–3 (4–1)	21 – da Silva	9 – da Silva	6 – Terry	Galen Center (5,017); Los Angeles, CA
January 26, 2020; 3:00 pm, ESPNU		at California	L 50–52	15–4 (4–2)	13 – da Silva	7 – da Silva	2 – Davis	Haas Pavilion (9,168); Berkeley, CA
January 30, 2020; 8:00 pm, P12N		Oregon State	L 63–68	15–5 (4–3)	22 – da Silva	8 – da Silva	4 – Davis	Maples Pavilion (2,820); Stanford, CA
February 1, 2020; 3:00 pm, P12N		No. 11 Oregon	W 70–60	16–5 (5–3)	27 – da Silva	15 – da Silva	3 – Tied	Maples Pavilion (5,523); Stanford, CA
February 6, 2020; 7:00 pm, P12N		at Utah	L 56–64	16–6 (5–4)	14 – Terry	11 – da Silva	2 – Tied	Jon M. Huntsman Center (10,049); Salt Lake City, UT
February 8, 2020; 3:00 pm, P12N		at No. 24 Colorado	L 74–81	16–7 (5–5)	19 – Delaire	6 – Kisunas	3 – Davis	CU Events Center (10,930); Boulder, CO
February 13, 2020; 8:00 pm, ESPN2		Arizona State	L 69–74	16–8 (5–6)	24 – Terry	4 – Tied	4 – Davis	Maples Pavilion (3,312); Stanford, CA
February 15, 2020; 5:00 pm, P12N		Arizona	L 60–69	16–9 (5–7)	25 – Wills	5 – Tied	2 – Davis	Maples Pavilion (4,839); Stanford, CA
February 20, 2020; 7:00 pm, P12N		at Washington	W 72–64	17–9 (6–7)	16 – da Silva	9 – da Silva	4 – Terry	Alaska Airlines Arena (8,622); Seattle, WA
February 23, 2020; 5:00 pm, ESPNU		at Washington State	W 75–57	18–9 (7–7)	19 – da Silva	10 – da Silva	5 – Terry	Beasley Coliseum (3,618); Pullman, WA
February 26, 2020; 7:00 pm, P12N		Utah	W 70–62	19–9 (8–7)	27 – Terry	7 – da Silva	4 – Davis	Maples Pavilion (2,978); Stanford, CA
March 1, 2020; 3:00 pm, ESPNU		No. 21 Colorado	W 72–64	20–9 (9–7)	19 – Wills	5 – Tied	5 – Davis	Maples Pavilion (7,123); Stanford, CA
March 5, 2020; 6:00 pm, P12N		at Oregon State	L 65–68	20–10 (9–8)	16 – Willis	10 – Terry	5 – Tied	Gill Coliseum (3,718); Corvallis, OR
March 7, 2020; 8:00 pm, FS1		at No. 13 Oregon	L 67–80	20–11 (9–9)	18 – da Silva	7 – da Silva	7 – Davis	Matthew Knight Arena (10,862); Eugene, OR
Pac-12 tournament
March 11, 2020; 6:00 pm, P12N	(7)	vs. (10) California; First round	L 51–63	20–12	16 – Davis	7 – da Silva	3 – Davis	T-Mobile Arena (7,452); Paradise, NV
*Non-conference game. ^{#}Rankings from AP Poll. (#) Tournament seedings in parentheses. All times are in Pacific Time.

== Ranking movement ==
Ranking movements Legend: ██ Increase in ranking ██ Decrease in ranking — = Not ranked RV = Received votes
	Week																				
Poll	Pre	1	2	3	4	5	6	7	8	9	10	11	12	13	14	15	16	17	18	19	Final
AP	—	—	—	—	—	—	RV	RV	RV	—	RV	RV	—	RV	—	—	—	RV	—		Not released
Coaches	—	—	—	—	RV	RV	RV	RV	—	—	25	RV	RV	RV	—	—	—	RV	RV		

*AP does not release post-NCAA Tournament rankings.
^Coaches did not release a Week 2 poll.
