= 2019–20 Cal State Northridge Matadors men's basketball team =

American college basketball season

2019–20 Cal State Northridge Matadors men's basketball
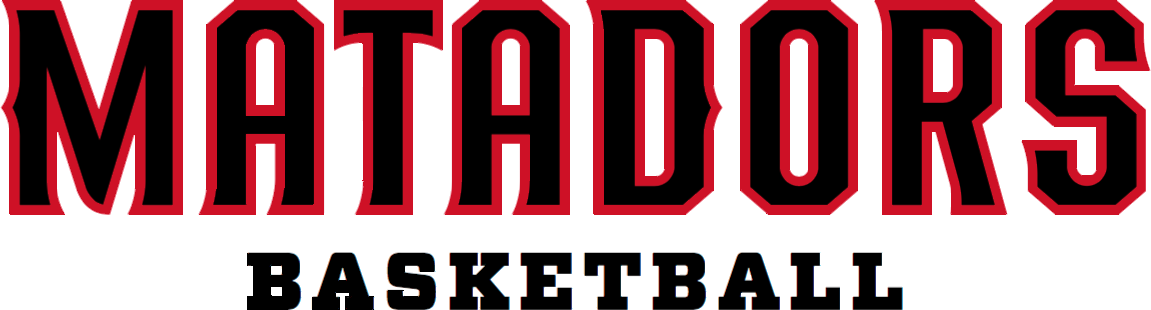
- Conference: Big West Conference
- Record: 15–17 (10–6 Big West)
- Head coach: Mark Gottfried (2nd season)
- Assistant coaches: Jim Harrick (2nd season); Jeff Dunlap (2nd season); Mo Williams (2nd season)
- Home arena: Matadome (Capacity: 1,250)

2019–20 Big West men's basketball standings
	Conf.				Overall
Team	W		L	PCT	W		L	PCT
UC Irvine	13	–	3	.813	21	–	11	.656
Cal State Northridge	10	–	6	.625	15	–	17	.469
UC Santa Barbara	10	–	6	.625	21	–	10	.677
Hawai'i	8	–	8	.500	17	–	13	.567
UC Davis	8	–	8	.500	14	–	18	.438
UC Riverside	7	–	9	.438	17	–	15	.531
Cal State Fullerton	6	–	10	.375	11	–	20	.355
Long Beach State	6	–	10	.375	11	–	21	.344
Cal Poly	4	–	12	.250	7	–	23	.233
Note: The 2020 Big West tournament was canceled due to the COVID-19 pandemic.

The 2019–20 Cal State Northridge Matadors men's basketball team represented California State University, Northridge in the 2019–20 NCAA Division I men's basketball season. The Matadors, led by second-year head coach Mark Gottfried, played their home games at the Matadome in Northridge, California as members of the Big West Conference. They finished the season 15–17, 10–6 in Big West play to finish in a tie for second place. They were set to be the No. 2 seed in the Big West tournament. However, the Big West tournament was canceled amid the COVID-19 pandemic.

== Previous season ==
The Matadors finished the 2018–19 season 13–21 overall, 7–9 in Big West play, finishing in a tie for 6th place. In the Big West tournament, they were defeated by UC Santa Barbara in the quarterfinals. They were invited to the CBI, where they fell to Utah Valley in the first round.

== Roster ==
2019–20 Cal State Northridge Matadors men's basketball team
Players
Coaches

Pos.	#	Name	Height	Weight	Year	Previous school	Hometown
F	0	Lance Coleman II	6 ft 6 in (1.98 m)	205 lb (93 kg)	RS Jr	Fullerton College	Antioch, California
G	1	Rodney Henderson Jr.	6 ft 5 in (1.96 m)	185 lb (84 kg)	Sr	Santiago Canyon College	Carson, California
G	2	Elijah Harkless	6 ft 4 in (1.93 m)	195 lb (88 kg)	So	Etiwanda High School	Rialto, California
G	3	Terrell Gomez	5 ft 8 in (1.73 m)	160 lb (73 kg)	Jr	Middlebrooks Academy	Los Angeles, California
G	10	Darius Brown II	6 ft 1 in (1.85 m)	180 lb (82 kg)	So	Pasadena High School	Pasadena, California
F	11	Festus Ndumanya	6 ft 7 in (2.01 m)	220 lb (100 kg)	Fr	Capistrano Valley Christian School	Anambra, Nigeria
G	12	Alex Sokol	6 ft 5 in (1.96 m)	175 lb (79 kg)	Jr	Valley Christian High School	San Jose, California
C	14	Dmytro Skapintsev	7 ft 1 in (2.16 m)	260 lb (118 kg)	Jr	Cherkasy Polytechnic Technical College	Cherkasy, Ukraine
F	15	Ron Artest III	6 ft 7 in (2.01 m)	215 lb (98 kg)	So	Hillcrest Prep	New York, New York
F	20	Miles Brookins	6 ft 9 in (2.06 m)	220 lb (100 kg)	Jr	La Salle	Cypress, California
F	25	Jared Pearre	6 ft 9 in (2.06 m)	190 lb (86 kg)	RS So	McKinney North High School	McKinney, Texas
C	30	Michael Ou	6 ft 9 in (2.06 m)	230 lb (104 kg)	So	Menaul School	Guangdong, China
G/F	32	Brendan Harrick	6 ft 5 in (1.96 m)	190 lb (86 kg)	RS Fr	Esperanza High School	Anaheim, California
C	34	Mahamadou Kaba-Camara	7 ft 0 in (2.13 m)	270 lb (122 kg)	Sr	Balboa High School	Conakry, Guinea
F	35	Lamine Diane	6 ft 7 in (2.01 m)	205 lb (93 kg)	RS So	Findlay Prep	Dakar, Senegal

Head coach

- Mark Gottfried (Alabama)

Assistant coach(es)

- Jim Harrick (Charleston (WV))
- Jeff Dunlap (UCLA)
- Mo Williams (Alabama)

Legend

- (C) Team captain
- (S) Suspended
- (I) Ineligible
- (W) Walk-on
- Injured
- Current redshirt

Roster
Last update: January 8, 2020

== Schedule and results ==
Date time, TV	Rank^{#}	Opponent^{#}	Result	Record	Site (attendance) city, state
Exhibition
October 28, 2019*; 7:00 pm, Big West.TV		Cal State Dominguez Hills	W 81–70		Matadome; Northridge, CA
Non-conference regular season
November 5, 2019*; 8:00 pm, P12N		at Oregon State	L 67–87	0–1	Gill Coliseum (3,422); Corvallis, OR
November 9, 2019*; 6:00 pm, Mountain West Network		at New Mexico	L 70–97	0–2	The Pit (10,335); Albuquerque, NM
November 12, 2019*; 7:00 pm, Big West.TV		Pepperdine	L 82–94	0–3	Matadome (1,321); Northridge, CA
November 15, 2019*; 4:00 pm, SECN		at No. 22 Auburn; Legends Classic campus-site game	L 70–116	0–4	Auburn Arena (8,389); Auburn, AL
November 17, 2019*; 1:00 pm, ESPN+		at Richmond; Legends Classic campus-site game	L 62–90	0–5	Robins Center (4,604); Richmond, VA
November 24, 2019*; 2:00 pm, FloSports		vs. Colgate; Legends Classic Subregional	L 56–64	0–6	Resch Center (152); Ashwaubenon, WI
November 25, 2019*; 5:00 pm, FloSports		at Green Bay; Legends Classic Subregional	L 84–85	0–7	Resch Center (1,436); Ashwaubenon, WI
November 30, 2019*; 3:00 pm, Big West.TV		Fresno State	W 73–72	1–7	Matadome (545); Northridge, CA
December 4, 2019*; 7:00 pm, Stadium		at Portland	W 71–64	2–7	Chiles Center (1,044); Portland, OR
December 6, 2019*; 7:35 pm, Pluto TV		at Portland State	L 67–73	2–8	Viking Pavilion (849); Portland, OR
December 11, 2019*; 7:00 pm, Big West.TV		North Dakota State	L 62–71	2–9	Matadome (832); Northridge, CA
December 15, 2019*; 3:00 pm, TheW.TV		at Pacific	L 73–79	2–10	Alex G. Spanos Center (1,284); Stockton, CA
December 22, 2019*; 3:00 pm, Big West.TV		San Francisco State	W 85–50	3–10	Matadome (506); Northridge, CA
December 28, 2019*; 3:00 pm, Mountain West Network		at Boise State	L 72–103	3–11	ExtraMile Arena (4,121); Boise, ID
December 31, 2019*; 12:00 pm, Big West.TV		Morgan State	W 93–82	4–11	Matadome (410); Northridge, CA
January 4, 2020*; 3:00 pm, Big West.TV		St. Katherine	W 109–75	5–11	Matadome (575); Northridge, CA
Big West regular season
January 8, 2020; 7:00 pm, ESPN3		Long Beach State	W 95–77	6–11 (1–0)	Matadome (635); Northridge, CA
January 11, 2020; 7:00 pm		at Cal Poly	L 56–74	6–12 (1–1)	Mott Athletics Center (2,089); San Luis Obispo, CA
January 16, 2020; 7:00 pm		at UC Riverside	W 80–68	7–12 (2–1)	SRC Arena (855); Riverside, CA
January 18, 2020; 3:00 pm, ESPN3		UC Davis	L 62–66	7–13 (2–2)	Matadome (712); Northridge, CA
January 22, 2020; 7:00 pm		at UC Santa Barbara	W 83–75	8–13 (3–2)	The Thunderdome (1,026); Santa Barbara, CA
January 25, 2020; 7:30 pm		at Cal State Fullerton	L 75–82	8–14 (3–3)	Titan Gym (941); Fullerton, CA
January 30, 2020; 8:00 pm, ESPNU		UC Santa Barbara	W 79–67	9–14 (4–3)	Matadome (2,075); Northridge, CA
February 1, 2020; 10:00 pm		at Hawaii	L 75–80	9–15 (4–4)	Stan Sheriff Center (6,553); Honolulu, HI
February 8, 2020; 7:00 pm, Big West.TV		UC Riverside	W 61–59	10–15 (5–4)	Matadome (815); Northridge, CA
February 13, 2020; 7:00 pm, ESPN3		Cal Poly	W 81–73	11–15 (6–4)	Matadome (693); Northridge, CA
February 15, 2020; 5:00 pm, Big West.TV		at UC Davis	L 98–110	11–16 (6–5)	The Pavilion (1,811); Davis, CA
February 22, 2020; 7:00 pm, Big West.TV		UC Irvine	L 64–87	11–17 (6–6)	Matadome (1,544); Northridge, CA
February 26, 2020; 7:00 pm, ESPN3		at Long Beach State	W 73–64	12–17 (7–6)	Walter Pyramid (1,816); Long Beach, CA
February 29, 2020; 7:00 pm, Big West.TV		Cal State Fullerton	W 99–92	13–17 (8–6)	Matadome (636); Northridge, CA
March 4, 2020; 7:00 pm, ESPN3		at UC Irvine	W 72–70	14–17 (9–6)	Bren Events Center (2,954); Irvine, CA
March 7, 2020; 7:00 pm, Big West.TV		Hawaii	W 86–82	15–17 (10–6)	Matadome (1,624); Northridge, CA
Big West tournament
March 12, 2020; 12:00 pm, ESPN3	(2)	vs. (7) Cal State Fullerton; Quarterfinals	Cancelled due to the COVID-19 pandemic		Honda Center; Anaheim, CA
*Non-conference game. ^{#}Rankings from AP Poll. (#) Tournament seedings in parentheses. All times are in Pacific.
