= 2020–21 Big West Conference men's basketball season =

- League: NCAA Division I
- Sport: Basketball
- Teams: 11

Regular season

Tournament

Big West men's basketball seasons

2020–21 Big West men's basketball standings
	Conf.				Overall
Team	W		L	PCT	W		L	PCT
UC Santa Barbara †	13	–	3	.813	22	–	5	.815
UC Irvine	10	–	4	.714	18	–	9	.667
UC Riverside	8	–	4	.667	14	–	8	.636
UC Davis	6	–	4	.600	10	–	8	.556
Cal State Bakersfield	9	–	7	.563	15	–	11	.577
Hawai'i	9	–	9	.500	11	–	10	.524
Cal State Fullerton	5	–	7	.417	6	–	10	.375
Cal State Northridge	5	–	9	.357	9	–	13	.409
Long Beach State	4	–	8	.333	6	–	12	.333
Cal Poly	1	–	15	.063	4	–	20	.167
UC San Diego*	0	–	0	–	7	–	10	.412
† 2021 Big West tournament winner * ineligible for the 2021 NCAA tournament and 2021 Big West tournament due to transition period; Big West games not counted in standings

The 2020–21 Big West Conference men's basketball season began with practices in October 2020, followed by the start of the 2020–21 NCAA Division I men's basketball season in November. Conference play began in January 2021 and concluded in March 2021. Games against UC San Diego were counted as non-conference games as their results were not counted in the league standings during their transition period.

== Preseason awards ==
Preseason awards were announced by the league office on November 11, 2020.

=== Preseason men's basketball media poll ===
(First place votes in parentheses)

1. UC Irvine (28) 270
2. UC Santa Barbara (9) 254
3. UC Davis (1) 182
4. Hawaii 165
5. UC Riverside 160
6. Long Beach State 141
7. CSU Bakersfield 117
8. CSU Northridge 102
9. Cal State Fullerton 95
10. Cal Poly 54

== Conference matrix ==
	Cal Poly	Cal State Bakersfield	CSU Fullerton	CSU Northridge	Hawaii	Long Beach State	UC Davis	UC Irvine	UC Riverside	UC San Diego	UC Santa Barbara
vs. Cal Poly	–	2−0	0−0	1−1	2−0	2−0	2−0	2−0	2−0	0−0	1–0
vs. Cal State Bakersfield	0–2	–	1−1	1−1	0−2	1−1	0−0	1−1	1−1	0−0	2–0
vs. CSU Fullerton	0–0	1−1	–	1–1	1−1	1−1	0−0	1−1	0−0	0–0	2–0
vs. CSU Northridge	1–1	1−1	1−1	–	1−1	0−0	1−1	0−0	1−0	0−0	2–0
vs. Hawaii	0–2	2−0	1−1	1−1	–	0−2	0−1	1−1	1−1	0–0	2–0
vs. Long Beach State	0−2	1−1	1−1	0−0	2−0	–	2−0	0−0	0−0	0–0	0–0
vs. UC Davis	0–2	0−0	0−0	1−1	1−0	0−2	–	0−0	0−0	0–0	2–0
vs. UC Irvine	0–2	1−1	1−1	0−0	1−1	0−0	0−0	–	1−1	0–0	0−2
vs. UC Riverside	0–2	1−1	0−0	0−1	1−1	0−0	0−0	1−1	–	0–0	1–1
vs. UC San Diego	0−0	0−0	0−0	0−0	0−0	0−0	0−0	0−0	1−0	–	0–0
vs. UC Santa Barbara	0–1	0−2	0−2	0−2	0−2	0−0	0−2	2−0	1−1	0–0	−
Total	1–14	9–7	5–7	5–7	9–8	4–6	5–4	8–4	7–4	0–0	12–3

== All-Big West awards ==
=== Big West men's basketball weekly awards ===
Week	Player(s) of the Week	School
Nov 30	Erza Manjon	UC Davis
Dec 7	Zyon Pullin	UC Riverside
Dec 14	TJ Starks	CSUN
Dec 21	JaQuori McLaughlin	UC Santa Barbara
Dec 28	Collin Welp	UC Irvine
Jan 4	JaQuori McLaughlin (2)	UC Santa Barbara
Jan 11	DJ Davis	UC Irvine
Jan 18	Tazé Moore	Cal State Bakersfield
Jan 25	JaQuori McLaughlin (3)	UC Santa Barbara
Feb 1	Justin McCall	Cal State Bakersfield
Feb 8	Justin Webster	Hawaii
Feb 15	Elijah Pepper	UC Davis
Feb 22	Darius Brown II	CSUN
Mar 1	Collin Welp (2)	UC Irvine
Mar 8	Zyon Pullin (2)	UC Riverside
