= 2019–20 UC Irvine Anteaters men's basketball team =

American college basketball season

2019–20 UC Irvine Anteaters men's basketball

Big West regular-season champions
- Conference: Big West Conference
- Record: 21–11 (13–3 Big West)
- Head coach: Russell Turner (10th season)
- Assistant coaches: Blaine Taylor; Ryan Badrtalei; Michael Wilder
- Home arena: Bren Events Center (Capacity: 5,000)

2019–20 Big West men's basketball standings
	Conf.				Overall
Team	W		L	PCT	W		L	PCT
UC Irvine	13	–	3	.813	21	–	11	.656
Cal State Northridge	10	–	6	.625	15	–	17	.469
UC Santa Barbara	10	–	6	.625	21	–	10	.677
Hawai'i	8	–	8	.500	17	–	13	.567
UC Davis	8	–	8	.500	14	–	18	.438
UC Riverside	7	–	9	.438	17	–	15	.531
Cal State Fullerton	6	–	10	.375	11	–	20	.355
Long Beach State	6	–	10	.375	11	–	21	.344
Cal Poly	4	–	12	.250	7	–	23	.233
Note: The 2020 Big West tournament was canceled due to the COVID-19 pandemic.

The 2019–20 UC Irvine Anteaters men's basketball team represented the University of California, Irvine in the 2019–20 NCAA Division I men's basketball season. The Anteaters were led by tenth-year head coach Russell Turner and played their home games at the Bren Events Center. UC Irvine was a member of the Big West Conference. The team won their second straight Big West regular-season title before the 2020 Big West Conference men's basketball tournament; subsequently, the remainder of the 2019–20 NCAA Division I men's basketball season and postseason tournaments were canceled as a result of the COVID-19 pandemic. The team finished 21–11, and won at least a share of 3 of the last 4 Big West regular-season titles. The program has won at least 20 games in 7 of the last 8 seasons. Turner became the winningest coach in program history on January 15 surpassing Pat Douglass's total of 197 wins and won his 4th Big West Coach of the Year Award. Evan Leonard, Eyassu Worku and Tommy Rutherford all recorded their 1,000th point during the season, the first time the program has had three players score 1,000 career points in the same season. The team was 12th in the nation in FG% defense, holding opponents to 38.8% shooting, 11th in total rebounds (1,269), and 3rd in rebounding margin (+9.4). Brad Greene pulled down a Bren Events Center-record 21 rebounds on January 11 vs. Hawaii.

== Previous season ==
The Anteaters finished the season a program-best 31–6 overall, and 15–1 in the conference, and recorded their first-ever NCAA tournament win over Kansas State in the South Region first round before falling to Oregon in the second round. During the season, the Anteaters participated in the 2019 Gulf Coast Showcase, which was held in Estero, Florida, where they were runners-up upon defeating UTSA and Tulane before losing to Toledo. Prior to the season, the Anteaters competed in the 2018 Asia-Pacific University Basketball Challenge, hosted by the KBA and Yonsei University where they were also runners-up.

== Offseason ==
=== Departures ===
Name	Pos.	Height	Weight	Year	Hometown	Reason for departure
Max Hazzard	G	5'10"	170	RS Junior	Los Angeles, CA	Graduated
Darrian Traylor	G	6'4"	210	RS Junior	Las Vegas, NV	Graduated
Spencer Rivers	G	6'2"	200	Senior	Winter Park, FL	Walk-on; graduated
Elston Jones	F	6'9"	275	RS Senior	Goodyear, AZ	Graduated
Robert Cartwright	G	6'2"	180	Graduate	Pasadena, CA	Graduated
Jonathan Galloway	C	6'10"	235	Graduate	Brentwood, CA	Graduated; signed with Bakken Bears
Solomon Ruddell	C	7'1"	235	Sophomore	Los Osos, California	Transferred to Biola

== Roster ==
2019–20 UC Irvine Anteaters men's basketball team
Players
Coaches

Pos.	#	Name	Height	Weight	Year	Previous school	Hometown
F	0	JC Butler (W)	6 ft 5 in (1.96 m)	200 lb (91 kg)	So	The Prairie School	Racine, WI
G	1	Devin Cole (W)	5 ft 11 in (1.8 m)	175 lb (79 kg)	RS Fr	Buena High School	Ventura, CA
G	2	Justin Hohn	6 ft 1 in (1.85 m)	175 lb (79 kg)	Fr	Tea High	Sioux Falls, SD
G	4	Aiden Krause	6 ft 4 in (1.93 m)	198 lb (90 kg)	RS Fr	Australian Institute of Sport	Mackay, Australia
G	5	Isaiah Lee	6 ft 2 in (1.88 m)	190 lb (86 kg)	Fr	Australian Institute of Sport	Sydney, Australia
G	10	Ofure Ujadughele	6 ft 3 in (1.91 m)	210 lb (95 kg)	Fr	Chino Hills High School	Chino Hills, CA
F	11	John Jr. Edgar	6 ft 5 in (1.96 m)	215 lb (98 kg)	Sr	Ayala High School	Chino Hills, CA
G	13	Austin Johnson	6 ft 9 in (2.06 m)	223 lb (101 kg)	RS Fr	Link Year Prep/Wheeler High School	Marietta, GA
G	14	Evan Leonard	6 ft 1 in (1.85 m)	185 lb (84 kg)	Sr	Cerritos High School	Cerritos, CA
G	15	Jeron Artest	6 ft 3 in (1.91 m)	184 lb (83 kg)	Fr	Bella Vista Prep	Scottsdale, AZ
G	24	Eyassu Worku	6 ft 2 in (1.88 m)	175 lb (79 kg)	Sr	Los Alamitos High School	Artesia, CA
F	25	Emmanuel Tshimanga	7 ft 0 in (2.13 m)	300 lb (136 kg)	Fr	Bella Vista Prep	Scottsdale, AZ
F	31	Dean Keeler	6 ft 9 in (2.06 m)	210 lb (95 kg)	Fr	Marina High School	Westminster, CA
F	40	Collin Welp	6 ft 9 in (2.06 m)	215 lb (98 kg)	RS So	Seattle Preparatory School	Seattle, WA
F	42	Tommy Rutherford	6 ft 8 in (2.03 m)	240 lb (109 kg)	Sr	Grossmont High School	El Cajon, CA
C	55	Brad Greene	6 ft 11 in (2.11 m)	270 lb (122 kg)	RS Jr	Lone Pine High School	Lone Pine, CA

Head coach

- Russell Turner (Hampden–Sydney)

Assistant coach(es)

- Blaine Taylor (Montana)
- Ryan Badrtalei (UCLA)
- Michael Wilder (UC Irvine)

Legend

- (C) Team captain
- (S) Suspended
- (I) Ineligible
- (W) Walk-on
- Injured
- Current redshirt

Roster
Last update: July 15, 2024

== Schedule ==
Date time, TV	Rank^{#}	Opponent^{#}	Result	Record	High points	High rebounds	High assists	Site (attendance) city, state
Exhibition
November 1, 2019*; 7:00 p.m.		UC San Diego	W 80–64		15 – Leonard	9 – Welp	3 – tied	Bren Events Center (3,413); Irvine, CA
Non-conference regular season
November 5, 2019*; 7:00 p.m., WCCN		at San Diego	W 76–73	1–0	19 – Leonard	7 – Edgar	3 – Worku	Jenny Craig Pavilion (1,517); San Diego, CA
November 9, 2019*; 5:00 p.m., WCCN		at Pepperdine	L 73–77	1–1	26 – Worku	9 – Welp	4 – Lee	Firestone Fieldhouse (1,475); Malibu, CA
November 12, 2019*; 7:00 p.m., Big West TV		Life Pacific	W 98–52	2–1	18 – Welp	10 – Greene	7 – Worku	Bren Events Center (1,392); Irvine, CA
November 15, 2019*; 6:00 p.m., MWN		at Boise State	W 69–60	3–1	15 – Worku	8 – Greene	5 – Welp	ExtraMile Arena; Boise, ID
November 18, 2019*; 6:00 p.m., P12N		at No. 23 Colorado; MGM Main Event campus-site game	L 53–69	3–2	12 – Welp	9 – Johnson	3 – tied	CU Events Center (5,904); Boulder, CO
November 21, 2019*; 4:00 p.m., FSSW+FCSP		at TCU; MGM Main Event campus-site game	L 58–59	3–3	14 – Welp	12 – Greene	5 – Worku	Schollmaier Arena (5,892); Fort Worth, TX
November 24, 2019*; 12:00 p.m., FloHoops		vs. Detroit Mercy; MGM Main Event Middleweight Bracket	L 74–86	3–4	14 – Rutherford	18 – Welp	5 – tied	Clark High School; Las Vegas, NV
November 26, 2019*; 1:00 p.m., FloHoops		vs. Louisiana; MGM Main Event Middleweight Bracket	W 92–67	4–4	20 – Rutherford	9 – Edgar	5 – tied	Clark High School; Las Vegas, NV
November 30, 2019*; 7:00 p.m., Big West TV		Eastern Michigan	W 77–56	5–4	31 – Welp	6 – Welp	5 – Lee	Bren Events Center (2,813); Irvine, CA
December 7, 2019*; 7:00 p.m., Big West TV		California Baptist	L 60–68	5–5	15 – tied	10 – Greene	6 – Worku	Bren Events Center (1,938); Irvine, CA
December 14, 2019*; 7:00 p.m., Big West TV		Pacific Union	W 120–63	6–5	22 – Johnson	10 – Krause	9 – Lee	Bren Events Center (1,463); Irvine, CA
December 16, 2019*; 4:00 p.m.		vs. Kent State; Sun Bowl Invitational semifinals	W 74–68	7–5	18 – Welp	7 – Welp	6 – Worku	Don Haskins Center (5,969); El Paso, TX
December 17, 2019*; 6:00 p.m., CUSA TV		at UTEP; Sun Bowl Invitational championship	L 61–67	7–6	19 – Worku	9 – Greene	4 – Lee	Don Haskins Center (6,934); El Paso, TX
December 20, 2019*; 5:00 p.m., ESPN3		at UIC	L 67–76	7–7	19 – Worku	7 – tied	4 – tied	Credit Union 1 Arena (1,567); Chicago, IL
December 28, 2019*; 7:00 p.m., Big West TV		Pacific	W 69–56	8–7	17 – Welp	9 – Greene	5 – Worku	Bren Events Center (1,855); Irvine, CA
January 4, 2020*; 11:00 a.m., ESPN+		at Harvard	L 73–77	8–8	21 – Worku	10 – Welp	4 – Worku	Lavietes Pavilion (1,636); Boston, MA
Big West regular season
January 11, 2020; 7:00 p.m., ESPN3		Hawaii	W 74–60	9–8 (1-0)	18 – Welp	21 – Greene	2 – tied	Bren Events Center (2,938); Irvine, CA
January 15, 2020; 7:00 p.m., ESPN3		at Cal State Fullerton	W 74–61	10–8 (2–0)	20 – tied	14 – Rutherford	4 – Krause	Titan Gym (689); Fullerton, CA
January 18, 2020; 7:30 p.m., KDOC-TV		UC Riverside	W 69–53	11–8 (3–0)	13 – Leonard	6 – Lee	5 – Worku	Bren Events Center (2,106); Irvine, CA
January 22, 2020; 7:00 p.m., ESPN3		at Long Beach State; Black & Blue Rivalry	L 56–63	11–9 (3–1)	14 – Leonard	8 – Welp	5 – Welp	Walter Pyramid (2,262); Long Beach, CA
January 25, 2020; 7:00 p.m., ESPN3		Cal Poly	W 74–67	12–9 (4–1)	18 – tied	8 – Greene	10 – Worku	Bren Events Center (3,941); Irvine, CA
January 30, 2020; 7:00 p.m., Big West TV		at UC Davis	W 80–65	13–9 (5–1)	19 – Worku	10 – Welp	4 – Edgar	The Pavilion (1,002); Davis, CA
February 1, 2020; 7:30 p.m., KDOC-TV		Cal State Fullerton	W 91–61	14–9 (6–1)	18 – tied	12 – Greene	6 – Worku	Bren Events Center (2,780); Irvine, CA
February 6, 2020; 7:00 p.m., ESPN3		UC Davis	W 83–72	15–9 (7–1)	17 – Greene	12 – Greene	6 – Leonard	Bren Events Center (1,756); Irvine, CA
February 8, 2020; 7:00 p.m., ESPNU		at UC Santa Barbara	L 61–64	15–10 (7–2)	16 – Greene	6 – Greene	3 – Worku	The Thunderdome (3,187); Santa Barbara, CA
February 12, 2020; 7:00 p.m., ESPN3		at UC Riverside	W 63–59	16–10 (8–2)	18 – Worku	10 – Greene	2 – 3 tied	SRC Arena (733); Riverside, CA
February 15, 2020; 9:00 p.m., ESPN2		at Hawaii	W 70–63	17–10 (9–2)	19 – Worku	8 – Greene	2 – Leonard	Stan Sheriff Center (7,591); Honolulu, HI
February 19, 2020; 7:00 p.m., ESPN3		Long Beach State; Black & Blue Rivalry	W 70–55	18–10 (10–2)	16 – Ruthreford	11 – Greene	3 – 3 tied	Bren Events Center (2,312); Irvine, CA
February 22, 2020; 7:00 p.m., Big West TV		at Cal State Northridge	W 87–64	19–10 (11–2)	18 – Leonard	11 – Greene	9 – Worku	Matadome (1,544); Northridge, CA
February 27, 2020; 8:00 p.m., ESPNU		at Cal Poly	W 82–76	20–10 (12–2)	22 – Leonard	6 – Edgar	5 – Worku	Mott Athletics Center (2,703); San Luis Obispo, CA
February 29, 2020; 7:00 p.m., ESPN3		UC Santa Barbara; Homecoming	W 69–58	21–10 (13–2)	20 – Worku	15 – Greene	5 – Worku	Bren Events Center (5,000); Irvine, CA
March 4, 2020; 7:00 p.m., ESPN3		Cal State Northridge	L 70–72	21–11 (13–3)	14 – Greene	11 – Greene	5 – Worku	Bren Events Center (2,954); Irvine, CA
Big West tournament
March 12, 2020; 6:00 p.m., ESPN3	(1)	vs. (8) Long Beach State; Quarterfinals	Cancelled due to the COVID-19 pandemic					Honda Center; Anaheim, CA
*Non-conference game. ^{#}Rankings from AP Poll. (#) Tournament seedings in parentheses.
