= 2019–20 Utah Utes men's basketball team =

American college basketball season

2019–20 Utah Utes men's basketball
- Conference: Pac-12 Conference
- Record: 16–15 (7–11 Pac–12)
- Head coach: Larry Krystkowiak (9th season)
- Assistant coaches: Tommy Connor; Andy Hill; Henry Martinez
- Home arena: Jon M. Huntsman Center

2019–20 Pac-12 Conference men's basketball standings
	Conf.				Overall
Team	W		L	PCT	W		L	PCT
No. 13 Oregon	13	–	5	.722	24	–	7	.774
UCLA	12	–	6	.667	19	–	12	.613
USC	11	–	7	.611	22	–	9	.710
Arizona State	11	–	7	.611	20	–	11	.645
Arizona	10	–	8	.556	21	–	11	.656
Colorado	10	–	8	.556	21	–	11	.656
Stanford	9	–	9	.500	20	–	12	.625
Oregon State	7	–	11	.389	18	–	13	.581
Utah	7	–	11	.389	16	–	15	.516
California	7	–	11	.389	14	–	18	.438
Washington State	6	–	12	.333	16	–	16	.500
Washington	5	–	13	.278	15	–	17	.469
Note: The 2020 Pac-12 Tournament was canceled prior to the quarterfinals due to the COVID-19 pandemic. Rankings from AP poll

The 2019–20 Utah Runnin' Utes men's basketball team represented the University of Utah during the 2019–20 NCAA Division I men's basketball season. The team was led by ninth-year head coach Larry Krystkowiak. They played their home games at the Jon M. Huntsman Center in Salt Lake City, Utah as members of the Pac-12 Conference. They finished the season 16–15, 7–11 in Pac-12 play to finish in a three-way tie for eighth place. They lost in the first round of the Pac-12 tournament to Oregon State.

== Previous season ==
The Utes finished the 2018–19 season finished the season 17–14, 11–7 in Pac-12 play to finish in third place. They lost in the quarterfinals of the Pac-12 tournament to Oregon.

== Off-season ==
On August 6, 2019, the NCAA placed the Utes on two years probation due to impermissible recruiting activities in April 2018.

=== Departures ===
Name	Num	Pos.	Height	Weight	Year	Hometown	Reason for departure
Naseem Gaskin	0	G	6'3"	175	Freshman	Oakland, CA	Transferred to Montana
Charles Jones Jr.	1	G	6'2"	200	Junior	Portland, OR	Transferred to Portland State
Sedrick Barefield	2	G	6'2"	190	Senior	Corona, CA	Graduated
Donnie Tillman	3	F	6'7"	225	Sophomore	Detroit, MI	Transferred to UNLV
Parker Van Dyke	5	G	6'3'	185	RS Senior	Salt Lake City, UT	Graduated
Christian Popoola	10	G	6'4"	190	Sophomore	Las Vegas, NV	Transferred to Salt Lake CC
Novak Topalovic	13	F	7'0"	230	RS Senior	Niš, Serbia	Graduated
Vante Hendrix	14	G	6'5"	190	RS Freshman	Woodland Hills, CA	Mid season transferred to New Mexico
Kevin Kremer	15	G	6'4"	190	Freshman	Chico, CA	Walk-on; transferred to Chaminade
Beau Rydalch	25	G	6'6"	205	Junior	Oakley, UT	Walk-on; left the team for personal reasons
Brandon Morley	31	F/C	7'0"	235	Junior	South Jordan, UT	Walk-on; graduate transferred to Utah Valley
Jayce Johnson	34	F/C	7'0"	235	RS Junior	Mission Viejo, CA	Graduate transferred to Marquette

=== Incoming transfers ===
Name	Num	Pos.	Height	Weight	Year	Hometown	Previous school
Alfonso Plummer	25	G	6'1"	175	Junior	Fajardo, PR	Arizona Western College

=== 2019 recruiting class ===
College recruiting information
Name	Hometown	School	Height	Weight	Commit date
Rylan Jones; PG	Logan, UT	Logan High School	5 ft 11 in (1.80 m)	150 lb (68 kg)	Aug 8, 2017
Rylan Jones; PG	Recruit ratings: Scout: Rivals: 247Sports: ESPN: (83)				
Matt Van Komen; C	Lehi, UT	Pleasant Grove High School	7 ft 4 in (2.24 m)	150 lb (68 kg)	Jul 30, 2018
Matt Van Komen; C	Recruit ratings: Scout: Rivals: 247Sports: ESPN: (82)				
Mikael Jantunen; PF	Helsinki, Finland	Helsinki Basketball Academy	6 ft 9 in (2.06 m)	215 lb (98 kg)	Oct 8, 2018
Mikael Jantunen; PF	Recruit ratings: Scout: Rivals: 247Sports: ESPN: (NR)				
Brendan Wenzel; SG	Helotes, TX	O'Connor High School	6 ft 5 in (1.96 m)	170 lb (77 kg)	Apr 18, 2019
Brendan Wenzel; SG	Recruit ratings: Scout: Rivals: 247Sports: ESPN: (NR)				
Overall recruit ranking:
Note: In many cases, Scout, Rivals, 247Sports, On3, and ESPN may conflict in their listings of height and weight.; In these cases, the average was taken. ESPN grades are on a 100-point scale.; Sources: "2019 Utah Basketball Commitment List". Rivals.; "Utah Utes 2019 Player Commits". ESPN.; "2019 Team Ranking". Rivals.

=== 2020 recruiting class ===
College recruiting information (2020)
Name	Hometown	School	Height	Weight	Commit date
Ian Martinez; SG	San Juan Capistrano, CA	J. Serra Catholic High School	6 ft 3 in (1.91 m)	165 lb (75 kg)	May 29, 2019
Ian Martinez; SG	Recruit ratings: Scout: Rivals: 247Sports: ESPN: (0)				
Mason Falslev; SG	Smithfield, UT	Sky View High School	6 ft 3 in (1.91 m)	180 lb (82 kg)	Jul 28, 2018
Mason Falslev; SG	Recruit ratings: Scout: Rivals: 247Sports: ESPN: (0)				
Overall recruit ranking:
Note: In many cases, Scout, Rivals, 247Sports, On3, and ESPN may conflict in their listings of height and weight.; In these cases, the average was taken. ESPN grades are on a 100-point scale.; Sources: "2020 Utah Basketball Commitment List". Rivals.; "Utah Utes 2020 Player Commits". ESPN.; "2020 Team Ranking". Rivals.

== Regular season ==
On November 8, the Utes defeated Mississippi Valley State 143–49 to set an NCAA record for largest margin of victory (94 points) over a Division I opponent.

== Roster ==
2019–20 Utah Utes men's basketball team
Players
Coaches

Pos.	#	Name	Height	Weight	Year	Previous school	Hometown
F	0	Luc Krystkowiak (W)	6 ft 4 in (1.93 m)	190 lb (86 kg)	Fr	Bingham HS	Salt Lake City, Utah
F	1	Timmy Allen	6 ft 6 in (1.98 m)	210 lb (95 kg)	So	Red Mountain HS	Mesa, Arizona
C	2	Matt Van Komen	7 ft 4 in (2.24 m)	220 lb (100 kg)	Fr	Pleasant Grove HS	Pleasant Grove, Utah
G	5	Jaxon Brenchley	6 ft 5 in (1.96 m)	190 lb (86 kg)	Fr	Ridgeline HS	Providence, Utah
G	10	Brandon Haddock (W)	6 ft 2 in (1.88 m)	165 lb (75 kg)	Fr	Carroll HS	Southlake, Texas
G	11	Both Gach	6 ft 7 in (2.01 m)	195 lb (88 kg)	So	AZ Compass Prep School	Austin, Minnesota
G	13	Elias Ballstaedt (W)	6 ft 6 in (1.98 m)	195 lb (88 kg)	Fr	Wasatch HS	Heber City, Utah
G	14	Brooks King (W)	6 ft 3 in (1.91 m)	200 lb (91 kg)	RS So	Centennial HS	Boise, Idaho
G	15	Rylan Jones	6 ft 1 in (1.85 m)	170 lb (77 kg)	Fr	Olympus HS	Salt Lake City, Utah
F	20	Mikael Jantunen	6 ft 8 in (2.03 m)	215 lb (98 kg)	Fr	Helsinki Basketball Academy	Helsinki, Finland
F	21	Riley Battin	6 ft 9 in (2.06 m)	220 lb (100 kg)	So	Oak Park HS	Oak Park, California
G	25	Alfonso Plummer	6 ft 1 in (1.85 m)	175 lb (79 kg)	Jr	Arizona Western College	Fajardo, Puerto Rico
G	30	Brendan Wenzel	6 ft 6 in (1.98 m)	180 lb (82 kg)	Fr	O'Connor HS	San Antonio, Texas
F	32	Lahat Thioune	6 ft 10 in (2.08 m)	210 lb (95 kg)	RS Fr	Florida Prep	Dakar, Senegal
F	35	Branden Carlson	6 ft 11 in (2.11 m)	210 lb (95 kg)	Fr	Bingham HS	South Jordan, Utah
F	40	Marc Reininger (W)	6 ft 9 in (2.06 m)	220 lb (100 kg)	Sr	Regis Jesuit HS	Monument, Colorado
G	45	Ben Bittner (W)	6 ft 6 in (1.98 m)	190 lb (86 kg)	So	Copper Hills HS	West Jordan, Utah

Head coach

- Larry Krystkowiak (Montana)

Assistant coach(es)

- Andy Hill (Eastern Washington)
- Tommy Connor (Utah)
- Henry Martinez

Legend

- (C) Team captain
- (S) Suspended
- (I) Ineligible
- (W) Walk-on
- Injured
- Current redshirt

Roster

== Schedule and results ==
Date time, TV	Rank^{#}	Opponent^{#}	Result	Record	Site (attendance) city, state
Exhibition
October 30, 2019*; 6:30 pm, P12N		UT Tyler	W 88–47		Jon M. Huntsman Center (7,994); Salt Lake City, UT
Non-conference regular season
November 5, 2019*; 8:30 pm, CBSSN		at Nevada	W 79–74	1–0	Lawlor Events Center (8,324); Reno, NV
November 8, 2019*; 7:00 pm, P12N		Mississippi Valley State	W 143–49	2–0	Jon M. Huntsman Center (9,926); Salt Lake City, UT
November 15, 2019*; 7:00 pm, P12N		Minnesota	W 73–69	3–0	Jon M. Huntsman Center (12,760); Salt Lake City, UT
November 21, 2019*; 5:00 pm, ESPNews		at Coastal Carolina; Myrtle Beach Invitational quarterfinals	L 57–79	3–1	HTC Center (2,269); Conway, SC
November 22, 2019*; 5:30 pm, ESPNews		vs. Ohio; Myrtle Beach Invitational 2nd round consolation	W 80–66	4–1	HTC Center (1,921); Conway, SC
November 24, 2019*; 8:30 am, ESPNU		vs. Tulane; Myrtle Beach Invitational 5th place game	L 61–65	4–2	HTC Center (3,212); Conway, SC
November 29, 2019*; 7:00 pm, P12N		UC Davis	W 77–73	5–2	Jon M. Huntsman Center (10,546); Salt Lake City, UT
December 4, 2019*; 6:00 pm, P12N		BYU; Rivalry/Old Oquirrh Bucket	W 102–95 ^{OT}	6–2	Jon M. Huntsman Center (11,565); Salt Lake City, UT
December 7, 2019*; 3:00 pm, P12N		Central Arkansas	W 98–67	7–2	Jon M. Huntsman Center (9,888); Salt Lake City, UT
December 14, 2019*; 2:00 pm, P12N		vs. Weber State; Old Oquirrh Bucket/Beehive Classic	W 60–49	8–2	Vivint Smart Home Arena; Salt Lake City, UT
December 18, 2019*; 9:00 pm, ESPN2		vs. No. 6 Kentucky; Neon Hoops Showcase	W 69–66	9–2	T-Mobile Arena (5,507); Paradise, NV
December 21, 2019*; 4:30 pm, P12N		vs. No. 20 San Diego State; Basketball Hall of Fame Classic	L 52–80	9–3	Staples Center (8,296); Los Angeles, CA
Pac-12 regular season
January 2, 2020; 6:30 pm, P12N		Oregon State	W 81–69	10–3 (1–0)	Jon M. Huntsman Center (9,579); Salt Lake City, UT
January 4, 2020; 3:00 pm, P12N		No. 4 Oregon	L 64–69	10–4 (1–1)	Jon M. Huntsman Center (13,104); Salt Lake City, UT
January 12, 2020; 4:00 pm, ESPNU		at No. 25 Colorado	L 52–91	10–5 (1–2)	CU Events Center (8,017); Boulder, CO
January 16, 2020; 6:30 pm, P12N		at Arizona	L 77–93	10–6 (1–3)	McKale Center (13,549); Tucson, AZ
January 18, 2020; 7:00 pm, P12N		at Arizona State	L 64–83	10–7 (1–4)	Desert Financial Arena (9,608); Tempe, AZ
January 23, 2020; 6:00 pm, P12N		Washington	W 67–66	11–7 (2–4)	Jon M. Huntsman Center (9,396); Salt Lake City, UT
January 25, 2020; 5:00 pm, P12N		Washington State	W 76–64	12–7 (3–4)	Jon M. Huntsman Center (9,807); Salt Lake City, UT
January 30, 2020; 7:30 pm, FS1		at USC	L 52–56	12–8 (3–5)	Galen Center (4,478); Los Angeles, CA
February 2, 2020; 1:00 pm, FS1		at UCLA	L 57–73	12–9 (3–6)	Pauley Pavilion (4,497); Los Angeles, CA
February 6, 2020; 8:00 pm, P12N		Stanford	W 64–56	13–9 (4–6)	Jon M. Huntsman Center (10,049); Salt Lake City, UT
February 8, 2020; 6:00 pm, P12N		California	W 60–45	14–9 (5–6)	Jon M. Huntsman Center (10,766); Salt Lake City, UT
February 13, 2020; 7:00 pm, P12N		at Oregon State	L 51–70	14–10 (5–7)	Gill Coliseum (4,118); Corvallis, OR
February 16, 2020; 7:00 pm, FS1		at No. 17 Oregon	L 62–80	14–11 (5–8)	Matthew Knight Arena (8,542); Eugene, OR
February 20, 2020; 8:30 pm, FS1		UCLA	L 58–69	14–12 (5–9)	Jon M. Huntsman Center (9,815); Salt Lake City, UT
February 23, 2020; 4:00 pm, ESPNU		USC	W 79–65	15–12 (6–9)	Jon M. Huntsman Center (9,765); Salt Lake City, UT
February 26, 2020; 8:00 pm, P12N		at Stanford	L 62–70	15–13 (6–10)	Maples Pavilion (2,978); Stanford, CA
February 29, 2020; 4:00 pm, P12N		at California	L 79–86 ^{OT}	15–14 (6–11)	Haas Pavilion (6,420); Berkeley, CA
March 7, 2020; 12:30 pm, P12N		Colorado	W 74–72 ^{OT}	16–14 (7–11)	Jon M. Huntsman Center (10,886); Salt Lake City, UT
Pac-12 tournament
March 11, 2020; 1:00 pm, P12N	(9)	vs. (8) Oregon State; First round	L 69–71	16–15	T-Mobile Arena (8,048); Paradise, NV
*Non-conference game. ^{#}Rankings from AP Poll. (#) Tournament seedings in parentheses. All times are in Mountain Time.
