= 2019–20 Cal Poly Mustangs men's basketball team =

American college basketball season

2019–20 Cal Poly Mustangs men's basketball
- Conference: Big West Conference
- Record: 7–23 (4–12 Big West)
- Head coach: John Smith (1st season)
- Associate head coach: Rodney Tention
- Assistant coaches: David Hanson; Justin Downer
- Home arena: Mott Athletics Center (Capacity: 3,032)

2019–20 Big West men's basketball standings
	Conf.				Overall
Team	W		L	PCT	W		L	PCT
UC Irvine	13	–	3	.813	21	–	11	.656
Cal State Northridge	10	–	6	.625	15	–	17	.469
UC Santa Barbara	10	–	6	.625	21	–	10	.677
Hawai'i	8	–	8	.500	17	–	13	.567
UC Davis	8	–	8	.500	14	–	18	.438
UC Riverside	7	–	9	.438	17	–	15	.531
Cal State Fullerton	6	–	10	.375	11	–	20	.355
Long Beach State	6	–	10	.375	11	–	21	.344
Cal Poly	4	–	12	.250	7	–	23	.233
Note: The 2020 Big West tournament was canceled due to the COVID-19 pandemic.

The 2019–20 Cal Poly Mustangs men's basketball team represented California Polytechnic State University in the 2019–20 NCAA Division I men's basketball season. The Mustangs, led by first-year head coach John Smith, played their home games at the Mott Athletics Center in San Luis Obispo, California as members of the Big West Conference. They finished the season 7–23, 4–12 in Big West play to finish in last place. They failed to qualify for the Big West tournament (although the Big West tournament was ultimately cancelled due to the COVID-19 pandemic).

== Previous season ==
The Mustangs finished the 2018–19 season 6–23 overall, 2–14 in Big West play to finish in ninth place. They failed to qualify for the Big West Conference tournament.

On March 6, 2019, it was announced that head coach Joe Callero would not be retained after his 10th season. He compiled a record of 126–184 while at Cal Poly. On March 27, it was announced that Cal State Fullerton associate head coach John Smith would be named the 11th head coach in program history.

== Roster ==
2019–20 Cal Poly Mustangs men's basketball team
Players
Coaches

Pos.	#	Name	Height	Weight	Year	Previous school	Hometown
PG	0	Keith Smith	6 ft 0 in (1.83 m)	170 lb (77 kg)	RS Jr	VMI	Danville, California
G	1	Job Alexander	6 ft 4 in (1.93 m)	200 lb (91 kg)	Sr	Trinidad State Junior College	Milwaukee, Wisconsin
G/F	2	Malek Harwell	6 ft 5 in (1.96 m)	188 lb (85 kg)	GS	Boise State	Pocatello, Idaho
G	3	Colby Rogers	6 ft 5 in (1.96 m)	190 lb (86 kg)	Fr	Roselle Catholic High School	Covington, Georgia
G/F	5	Mark Crowe	6 ft 5 in (1.96 m)	205 lb (93 kg)	Jr	Wilson High School	Dallas, Texas
G	10	Jared Rice	5 ft 10 in (1.78 m)	180 lb (82 kg)	So	Central Catholic High School	Modesto, California
F	14	Tuukka Jaakkola	6 ft 10 in (2.08 m)	240 lb (109 kg)	So	Helsinki Basketball Academy	Helsinki, Finland
F	15	Alimamy Koroma	6 ft 8 in (2.03 m)	220 lb (100 kg)	Fr	Prolific Prep Academy	Freetown, Sierra Leone
G	22	Colin McCarthy	6 ft 4 in (1.93 m)	205 lb (93 kg)	RS Fr	Serra High School	Redwood City, California
G	24	Junior Ballard	6 ft 3 in (1.91 m)	200 lb (91 kg)	So	Modesto Christian School	Stockton, California
G	25	Jamal Smith	6 ft 3 in (1.91 m)	170 lb (77 kg)	GS	Cal State Fullerton	Moreno Valley, California
F	30	Hank Hollingsworth	6 ft 10 in (2.08 m)	235 lb (107 kg)	Sr	Chelan High School	Chelan, Washington
F	31	Nolan Taylor	6 ft 7 in (2.01 m)	260 lb (118 kg)	RS Jr	Pepperdine	Keller, Texas
F	33	Kyle Colvin	6 ft 6 in (1.98 m)	200 lb (91 kg)	RS Fr	Mission Prep High School	San Luis Obispo, California

Head coach

- John Smith (Dominican (CA))

Assistant coach(es)

- Rodney Tention (San Francisco)
- David Hanson (Cal Poly)
- Justin Downer (Jessup)

Legend

- (C) Team captain
- (S) Suspended
- (I) Ineligible
- (W) Walk-on
- Injured
- Current redshirt

Roster
Last update: January 8, 2020

== Schedule and results ==
Date time, TV	Opponent	Result	Record	Site (attendance) city, state
Tour of London
September 3, 2019*; 11:00 am	at Surrey Scorchers	W 81–69		Surrey Sports Park (100); Guildford, England
September 4, 2019*; 8:00 am	at Barking Abbey Basketball Academy	W 75–61		Barking Abbey School; Barking, England
September 6, 2019*; 11:00 am	at London Lions	L 71–89		Copper Box Arena (1,500); Hackney, England
September 7, 2019*; 10:00 am	at Solent Kestrels	L 90–93 ^{OT}		Solent Sports Complex; Southampton, England
Non-conference regular season
November 8, 2019*; 7:00 pm	at Santa Clara	L 63–77	0–1	Leavey Center (2,000); Santa Clara, CA
November 11, 2019*; 11:00 am, ESPN+	at North Dakota State	L 67–74	0–2	Scheels Center (2,006); Fargo, ND
November 15, 2019*; 7:00 pm	Simpson	W 89–45	1–2	Mott Athletics Center (1,762); San Luis Obispo, CA
November 17, 2019*; 5:00 pm	at No. 18 Saint Mary's	L 48–79	1–3	University Credit Union Pavilion (3,306); Moraga, CA
November 22, 2019*; 6:00 pm, FS1	at Creighton; Continental Tire Las Vegas Invitational campus-site game	L 70–86	1–4	CHI Health Center Omaha (16,783); Omaha, NE
November 24, 2019*; 2:00 pm, BTN	at Iowa; Continental Tire Las Vegas Invitational campus-site game	L 59–85	1–5	Carver–Hawkeye Arena (10,730); Iowa City, IA
November 28, 2019*; 11:00 am	vs. Tennessee State; Continental Tire Las Vegas Invitational semifinals	L 72–82	1–6	Orleans Arena; Las Vegas, NV
November 29, 2019*; 11:00 am	vs. LIU; Continental Tire Las Vegas Invitational third-place game	L 69–82	1–7	Orleans Arena; Las Vegas, NV
December 7, 2019*; 7:00 pm	Siena	W 70–66	2–7	Mott Athletics Center (1,632); San Luis Obispo, CA
December 14, 2019*; 7:00 pm	Fresno State	L 37–62	2–8	Mott Athletics Center (1,965); San Luis Obispo, CA
December 18, 2019*; 7:05 pm	at Sacramento State	L 56–57	2–9	The Nest (522); Sacramento, CA
December 21, 2019*; 7:00 pm	Cal State Bakersfield	L 50–72	2–10	Mott Athletics Center (1,545); San Luis Obispo, CA
December 28, 2019*; 4:00 pm, FSSD	at No. 15 San Diego State	L 57–73	2–11	Viejas Arena (12,414); San Diego, CA
January 3, 2020*; 7:00 pm	Vanguard	W 85–82	3–11	Mott Athletics Center (1,262); San Luis Obispo, CA
Big West regular season
January 8, 2020; 7:00 pm	UC Santa Barbara; Rivalry	L 45–63	3–12 (0–1)	Mott Athletics Center (2,682); San Luis Obispo, CA
January 11, 2020; 7:00 pm	Cal State Northridge	W 74–56	4–12 (1–1)	Mott Athletics Center (2,089); San Luis Obispo, CA
January 16, 2020; 9:00 pm	at Hawaii	L 61–65	4–13 (1–2)	Stan Sheriff Center (4,811); Honolulu, HI
January 23, 2020; 7:00 pm, ESPN3	at UC Riverside	L 64–97	4–14 (1–3)	SRC Arena (703); Riverside, CA
January 25, 2020; 7:00 pm, ESPN3	at UC Irvine	L 67–74	4–15 (1–4)	Bren Events Center (3,941); Irvine, CA
January 30, 2020; 7:00 pm	Cal State Fullerton	W 101–100 ^{OT}	5–15 (2–4)	Mott Athletics Center (1,483); San Luis Obispo, CA
February 1, 2020; 5:00 pm	at UC Davis	L 51–66	5–16 (2–5)	The Pavilion (2,263); Davis, CA
February 5, 2020; 7:00 pm	Long Beach State	W 92–75	6–16 (3–5)	Mott Athletics Center (1,562); San Luis Obispo, CA
February 8, 2020; 7:00 pm	Hawaii	W 79–75	7–16 (4–5)	Mott Athletics Center (2,235); San Luis Obispo, CA
February 13, 2020; 7:00 pm, ESPN3	at Cal State Northridge	L 73–81	7–17 (4–6)	Matadome (693); Northridge, CA
February 15, 2020; 6:00 pm, ESPN3	at Cal State Fullerton	L 101–105 ^{4OT}	7–18 (4–7)	Titan Gym (692); Fullerton, CA
February 20, 2020; 7:00 pm	UC Davis	L 62–77	7–19 (4–8)	Mott Athletics Center (1,588); San Luis Obispo, CA
February 22, 2020; 7:00 pm	UC Riverside	L 49–61	7–20 (4–9)	Mott Athletics Center (1,935); San Luis Obispo, CA
February 27, 2020; 7:00 pm	UC Irvine	L 76–82	7–21 (4–10)	Mott Athletics Center (2,703); San Luis Obispo, CA
March 5, 2020; 7:00 pm, ESPN3	at Long Beach State	L 73–80	7–22 (4–11)	Walter Pyramid (1,641); Long Beach, CA
March 7, 2020; 7:00 pm	at UC Santa Barbara; Rivalry	L 67–69	7–23 (4–12)	The Thunderdome; Santa Barbara, CA
*Non-conference game. ^{#}Rankings from AP Poll. (#) Tournament seedings in parentheses. All times are in Pacific.
