= 2019–20 UC Santa Barbara Gauchos men's basketball team =

American college basketball season

2019–20 UC Santa Barbara Gauchos men's basketball
- Conference: Big West Conference
- Record: 21–10 (10–6 Big West)
- Head coach: Joe Pasternack (3rd season)
- Associate head coach: John Rillie
- Assistant coaches: Larry Lewis; Ben Tucker
- Home arena: The Thunderdome (Capacity: 5,600)

2019–20 Big West men's basketball standings
	Conf.				Overall
Team	W		L	PCT	W		L	PCT
UC Irvine	13	–	3	.813	21	–	11	.656
Cal State Northridge	10	–	6	.625	15	–	17	.469
UC Santa Barbara	10	–	6	.625	21	–	10	.677
Hawai'i	8	–	8	.500	17	–	13	.567
UC Davis	8	–	8	.500	14	–	18	.438
UC Riverside	7	–	9	.438	17	–	15	.531
Cal State Fullerton	6	–	10	.375	11	–	20	.355
Long Beach State	6	–	10	.375	11	–	21	.344
Cal Poly	4	–	12	.250	7	–	23	.233
Note: The 2020 Big West tournament was canceled due to the COVID-19 pandemic.

The 2019–20 UC Santa Barbara Gauchos men's basketball team represent the University of California, Santa Barbara in the 2019–20 NCAA Division I men's basketball season. The Gauchos, led by 3rd-year head coach Joe Pasternack, play their home games at The Thunderdome in Santa Barbara, California as members of the Big West Conference.

== Previous season ==
The Gauchos finished the 2018–19 season 22–10 overall, 10–6 in Big West play, finishing in 2nd place. In the Big West tournament, they defeated Cal State Northridge in the quarterfinals, before falling to Cal State Fullerton in the semifinals.

== Roster ==
2019–20 UC Santa Barbara Gauchos men's basketball team
Players
Coaches

Pos.	#	Name	Height	Weight	Year	Previous school	Hometown
G	0	Sékou Touré	6 ft 5 in (1.96 m)	185 lb (84 kg)	So	Coliseum College Prep Academy	Conakry, Guinea
G	1	Roberto Gittens	6 ft 5 in (1.96 m)	220 lb (100 kg)	Jr	College of Southern Idaho	Tacoma, Washington
F	2	Matt Freeman	6 ft 10 in (2.08 m)	220 lb (100 kg)	GS	Oklahoma	Auckland, New Zealand
G	3	JaQuori McLaughlin	6 ft 4 in (1.93 m)	190 lb (86 kg)	Jr	Oregon State	Tacoma, Washington
G	4	Devearl Ramsey	6 ft 0 in (1.83 m)	185 lb (84 kg)	Jr	Nevada	Los Angeles, California
F	5	Jay Nagle	6 ft 8 in (2.03 m)	215 lb (98 kg)	So	Will C. Wood HS	Vacaville, California
G	11	Brandon Cyrus	6 ft 5 in (1.96 m)	190 lb (86 kg)	Jr	DePaul	Oakville, Ontario
F	12	Amadou Sow	6 ft 9 in (2.06 m)	235 lb (107 kg)	So	Coliseum College Prep Academy	Bamako, Mali
F	14	Jakov Kukic	6 ft 10 in (2.08 m)	230 lb (104 kg)	Fr	La Lumiere School	Split, Croatia
G	15	Max Cheylov	6 ft 3 in (1.91 m)	175 lb (79 kg)	Fr	Calabasas HS	Toronto, Canada
G	21	Max Heidegger	6 ft 3 in (1.91 m)	180 lb (82 kg)	Sr	Oaks Christian School	Malibu, California
F	34	Eric Bower	6 ft 7 in (2.01 m)	210 lb (95 kg)	So	Hillsdale HS	San Mateo, California
F	35	Robinson Idehen	6 ft 10 in (2.08 m)	230 lb (104 kg)	Jr	Trinity Valley CC	Tudela, Navarre, Spain
F	40	Andrew Pickles	6 ft 7 in (2.01 m)	225 lb (102 kg)	Sr	Mercer Island HS	Seattle, Washington
G	55	Darren Long	6 ft 3 in (1.91 m)	165 lb (75 kg)	Fr	Harvard-Westlake School	Altadena, California
G		Ajare Sanni (redshirt)	6 ft 3 in (1.91 m)	170 lb (77 kg)	RS So	Pacific	Houston, Texas

Head coach

- Joe Pasternack (Indiana)

Assistant coach(es)

- John Rillie (Gonzaga)
- Larry Lewis (Morehouse)
- Ben Tucker (Arizona)

Legend

- (C) Team captain
- (S) Suspended
- (I) Ineligible
- (W) Walk-on
- Injured
- Current redshirt

Roster
Last update: June 6, 2020

== Schedule and results ==
Date time, TV	Rank^{#}	Opponent^{#}	Result	Record	Site (attendance) city, state
Non-conference regular season
November 6, 2019*; 7:00 pm, BigWest.tv		Jackson State	W 83–62	1–0	The Thunderdome (1,517); Santa Barbara, CA
November 10, 2019*; 4:00 pm, P12N		at UCLA	L 61–77	1–1	Pauley Pavilion (6,235); Los Angeles, CA
November 16, 2019*; 2:00 pm		Rice	L 81–82	1–2	The Thunderdome (1,503); Santa Barbara, CA
November 20, 2019*; 7:00 pm, P12N		at Oregon State; Continental Tire Las Vegas Classic campus-site game	L 67–78	1–3	Gill Coliseum (3,553); Corvallis, OR
November 23, 2019*; 1:00 pm		Menlo	W 88–69	2–3	The Thunderdome (712); Santa Barbara, CA
November 27, 2019*; 7:00 pm		Portland State; Continental Tire Las Vegas Classic campus-site game	W 81–70	3–3	The Thunderdome (1,077); Santa Barbara, CA
November 29, 2019*; 7:00 pm		Grambling State	W 67–58	4–3	The Thunderdome (1,039); Santa Barbara, CA
December 3, 2019*; 7:00 pm, ESPN3		at Cal State Bakersfield	W 64–60	5–3	Icardo Center (2,808); Bakersfield, CA
December 7, 2019*; 12:00 pm, ESPN+		at UT Arlington	W 72–68	6–3	College Park Center (1,392); Arlington, TX
December 14, 2019*; 1:00 pm		at Southern Utah	L 61–62	6–4	America First Event Center (1,810); Cedar City, UT
December 16, 2019*; 6:30 pm		at Idaho State	W 74–68 ^{OT}	7–4	Reed Gym (1,084); Pocatello, ID
December 20, 2019*; 7:00 pm		Southern	W 77–68	8–4	The Thunderdome (837); Santa Barbara, CA
December 22, 2019*; 2:00 pm		Merrimack	W 68–50	9–4	The Thunderdome (749); Santa Barbara, CA
December 29, 2019*; 3:00 pm, ESPN+		at Louisiana	W 85–77	10–4	Cajundome (3,455); Lafayette, LA
January 2, 2020*; 7:00 pm		Westmont	W 87–66	11–4	The Thunderdome (1,767); Santa Barbara, CA
Big West regular season
January 8, 2020; 7:00 pm		at Cal Poly; Rivalry	W 63–45	12–4 (1–0)	Mott Athletics Center (2,682); San Luis Obispo, CA
January 11, 2020; 4:00 pm		Long Beach State	L 52–55	12–5 (1–1)	The Thunderdome (1,753); Santa Barbara, CA
January 18, 2020; 10:00 pm		at Hawaii	L 63–70	12–6 (1–2)	Stan Sheriff Center (5,614); Honolulu, HI
January 22, 2020; 7:00 pm, Big West TV		Cal State Northridge	L 75–83	12–7 (1–3)	The Thunderdome (1,026); Santa Barbara, CA
January 25, 2020; 7:00 pm		UC Riverside	W 65–63	13–7 (2–3)	The Thunderdome (1,498); Santa Barbara, CA
January 30, 2020; 8:00 pm, ESPNU		at Cal State Northridge	L 67–79	13–8 (2–4)	Matadome (2,075); Northridge, CA
February 1, 2020; 4:00 pm, ESPN3		at Long Beach State	W 87–62	14–8 (3–4)	Walter Pyramid (1,829); Long Beach, CA
February 6, 2020; 7:00 pm		Hawaii	W 76–66	15–8 (4–4)	The Thunderdome (1,346); Santa Barbara, CA
February 8, 2020; 7:00 pm, ESPNU		UC Irvine	W 64–61	16–8 (5–4)	The Thunderdome (3,187); Santa Barbara, CA
February 13, 2020; 7:00 pm		at UC Davis	L 75–84	16–9 (5–5)	The Pavilion (2,237); Davis, CA
February 20, 2020; 7:00 pm		at Cal State Fullerton	W 75–66	17–9 (6–5)	Titan Gym (789); Fullerton, CA
February 22, 2020; 7:00 pm		UC Davis	W 70–56	18–9 (7–5)	The Thunderdome (2,219); Santa Barbara, CA
February 27, 2020; 8:00 pm		at UC Riverside	W 65–60	19–9 (8–5)	SRC Arena (607); Riverside, CA
February 29, 2020; 7:00 pm, ESPN3		at UC Irvine	L 58–69	19–10 (8–6)	Bren Events Center (5,000); Irvine, CA
March 5, 2020; 7:00 pm		Cal State Fullerton	W 55–53	20–10 (9–6)	The Thunderdome (1,079); Santa Barbara, CA
March 7, 2020; 7:00 pm		Cal Poly; Rivalry	W 69–67	21–10 (10–6)	The Thunderdome; Santa Barbara, CA
Big West tournament
March 12, 2020; 2:30 pm, ESPN3	(3)	vs. (6) UC Riverside; Quarterfinals	Cancelled due to the COVID-19 pandemic		Honda Center; Anaheim, CA
*Non-conference game. ^{#}Rankings from AP Poll. (#) Tournament seedings in parentheses. All times are in Pacific.
