= 2019–20 UC Riverside Highlanders men's basketball team =

American college basketball season

2019–20 UC Riverside Highlanders men's basketball
- Conference: Big West Conference
- Record: 17–15 (7–9 Big West)
- Head coach: David Patrick (2nd season)
- Assistant coaches: Mike Magpayo; Michael Czepil; Michael Lecak
- Home arena: SRC Arena (Capacity: 2,750)

2019–20 Big West men's basketball standings
	Conf.				Overall
Team	W		L	PCT	W		L	PCT
UC Irvine	13	–	3	.813	21	–	11	.656
Cal State Northridge	10	–	6	.625	15	–	17	.469
UC Santa Barbara	10	–	6	.625	21	–	10	.677
Hawai'i	8	–	8	.500	17	–	13	.567
UC Davis	8	–	8	.500	14	–	18	.438
UC Riverside	7	–	9	.438	17	–	15	.531
Cal State Fullerton	6	–	10	.375	11	–	20	.355
Long Beach State	6	–	10	.375	11	–	21	.344
Cal Poly	4	–	12	.250	7	–	23	.233
Note: The 2020 Big West tournament was canceled due to the COVID-19 pandemic.

The 2019–20 UC Riverside Highlanders men's basketball team represented the University of California, Riverside in the 2019–20 NCAA Division I men's basketball season. The Highlanders, led by second-year head coach David Patrick, played their home games at SRC Arena in Riverside, California as members of the Big West Conference. They finished the season 17–15, 7–9 in Big West play to finish in sixth place. They were set to be the No. 6 seed in the Big West tournament. However, the Big West tournament was canceled amid the COVID-19 pandemic.

== Previous season ==
The Highlanders finished the 2018–19 season 10–23 overall, 4–12 in Big West play, finishing in 8th place. In the Big West tournament, they were defeated by UC Irvine in the quarterfinals.

== Roster ==
2019–20 UC Riverside Highlanders men's basketball team
Players
Coaches

Pos.	#	Name	Height	Weight	Year	Previous school	Hometown
G	0	Dragan Elkaz	6 ft 5 in (1.96 m)	205 lb (93 kg)	So	Westfields Sports HS	Green Valley, Australia
F	1	Arinze Chidom	6 ft 9 in (2.06 m)	240 lb (109 kg)	RS Jr	Washington State	Oakland, CA
SG	2	Quinton Ford	6 ft 3 in (1.91 m)	185 lb (84 kg)	Fr	Copperas Cove HS	Copperas Cove, TX
G	3	DJ McDonald	5 ft 11 in (1.8 m)	175 lb (79 kg)	So	Bishop Alemany HS	Sylmar, CA
SF	4	Daniel Mading	6 ft 9 in (2.06 m)	200 lb (91 kg)	RS So	San Jacinto College	Perth, Australia
PG	5	Zyon Pullin	6 ft 4 in (1.93 m)	195 lb (88 kg)	Fr	College Park HS	Pleasant Hill, CA
F	11	Zac Watson	6 ft 7 in (2.01 m)	210 lb (95 kg)	So	Liberty HS	Plano, TX
PG	13	Khyber Kabellis	6 ft 4 in (1.93 m)	185 lb (84 kg)	GS	Pacific	Escondido, CA
G	15	Dikymbe Martin	6 ft 1 in (1.85 m)	170 lb (77 kg)	Sr	JW North HS	Riverside, CA
G	22	Dominick Pickett	6 ft 3 in (1.91 m)	210 lb (95 kg)	RS Jr	Rancho Verde HS	Moreno Valley, CA
F/C	23	Angus McWilliam	6 ft 10 in (2.08 m)	240 lb (109 kg)	RS So	TCU	Christchurch, New Zealand
SG	24	Jaylen Cross	6 ft 4 in (1.93 m)	185 lb (84 kg)	Fr	Culver City HS	Melbourne, Australia
C	25	Callum McRae	7 ft 1 in (2.16 m)	275 lb (125 kg)	So	Palmerston North Boys' HS	Palmerston North, New Zealand
G	35	George Willborn III	6 ft 3 in (1.91 m)	195 lb (88 kg)	Jr	UTSA	Chicago, IL

Head coach

- David Patrick (Louisiana)

Assistant coach(es)

- Mike Magpayo (UC Santa Barbara)
- Michael Czepil (Nicholls State)
- Michael Lecak (Pittsburgh)

Legend

- (C) Team captain
- (S) Suspended
- (I) Ineligible
- (W) Walk-on
- Injured
- Current redshirt

Roster
Last update: June 7, 2024

== Schedule and results ==
Date time, TV	Rank^{#}	Opponent^{#}	Result	Record	Site (attendance) city, state
Exhibition
November 1, 2019*; 7:00 p.m.		Life Pacific	W 73–45		SRC Arena; Riverside, CA
Non-conference regular season
November 5, 2019*; 6:00 p.m., BTN		at Nebraska	W 66–47	1–0	Pinnacle Bank Arena (15,745); Lincoln, NE
November 9, 2019*; 2:00 p.m., BigWest.TV		Idaho	W 58–51	2–0	SRC Arena (463); Riverside, CA
November 15, 2019*; 7:05 p.m., Pluto TV		at Sacramento State	L 49–62	2–1	Hornets Nest (635); Sacramento, CA
November 17, 2019*; 3:00 p.m., Stadium		at Pacific; College Roadshow (MTE)	L 51–58	2–2	Alex G. Spanos Center (1,243); Stockton, CA
November 21, 2019*; 4:00 p.m., BigWest.TV		Redlands; College Roadshow (MTE)	W 76–44	3–2	SRC Arena (298); Riverside, CA
November 23, 2019*; 3:00 p.m.		Denver	W 73–49	4–2	SRC Arena (702); Riverside, CA
November 26, 2019*; 7:00 p.m., BigWest.TV		Longwood; College Roadshow (MTE)	W 71–58	5–2	SRC Arena (274); Riverside, CA
November 29, 2019*; 2:00 p.m., BigWest.TV		SIU Edwardsville; College Roadshow (MTE)	W 69–51	6–2	SRC Arena (304); Riverside, CA
December 4, 2019*; 7:00 p.m., ESPN+		at California Baptist; Crosstown Showdown	L 67–79	6–3	CBU Events Center (4,067); Riverside, CA
December 6, 2019*; 7:00 p.m., BigWest.TV		Cal Lutheran	W 74–40	7–3	SRC Arena (363); Riverside, CA
December 15, 2019*; 1:30 p.m., P12N		at Washington State	L 56–70	7–4	Beasley Coliseum (1,995); Pullman, WA
December 19, 2019*; 7:00 p.m., BigWest.TV		Northern Arizona	L 56–63	7–5	SRC Arena (400); Riverside, CA
December 22, 2019*; 2:00 p.m.		at San Jose State	W 80–65	8–5	Provident Credit Union Event Center (1,264); San Jose, CA
December 28, 2019*; 6:00 p.m.		at Fresno State	W 60–57	9–5	Save Mart Center (4,740); Fresno, CA
December 31, 2019*; 1:00 p.m., Mountain West Network		at Air Force	L 56–105	9–6	Clune Arena (1,356); Colorado Springs, CO
January 4, 2020*; 5:00 p.m., BigWest.TV		San Diego Christian	W 89–51	10–6	SRC Arena (225); Riverside, CA
Big West regular season
January 9, 2020; 7:00 p.m.		at UC Davis	W 65–59	11–6 (1–0)	The Pavilion (1,322); Davis, CA
January 11, 2020; 5:00 p.m., BigWest.TV		Cal State Fullerton	W 65–59	12–6 (2–0)	SRC Arena (620); Riverside, CA
January 16, 2020; 7:00 p.m., BigWest.TV		Cal State Northridge	L 68–80	12–7 (2–1)	SRC Arena (855); Riverside, CA
January 18, 2020; 7:30 p.m., KDOC-TV		at UC Irvine	L 53–69	12–8 (2–2)	Bren Events Center (2,106); Irvine, CA
January 23, 2020; 7:00 p.m., ESPN3		Cal Poly	W 97–64	13–8 (3–2)	SRC Arena (703); Riverside, CA
January 25, 2020; 7:00 p.m.		at UC Santa Barbara	L 63–65	13–9 (3–3)	The Thunderdome (1,498); Santa Barbara, CA
January 30, 2020; 7:00 p.m., ESPN3		Long Beach State	W 77–69	14–9 (4–3)	SRC Arena (923); Riverside, CA
February 5, 2020; 7:00 p.m., ESPN3		at Cal State Fullerton	L 48–61	14–10 (4–4)	Titan Gym (790); Fullerton, CA
February 8, 2020; 7:00 p.m.		at Cal State Northridge	L 59–61	14–11 (4–5)	Matadome (815); Northridge, CA
February 12, 2020; 7:00 p.m., ESPN3		UC Irvine	L 59–63	14–12 (4–6)	SRC Arena (733); Riverside, CA
February 15, 2020; 4:00 p.m.		at Long Beach State	L 63–65 ^{OT}	14–13 (4–7)	Walter Pyramid (1,626); Long Beach, CA
February 20, 2020; 8:00 p.m., BigWest.TV		Hawaii	L 55–56	14–14 (4–8)	SRC Arena (937); Riverside, CA
February 22, 2020; 7:00 p.m.		at Cal Poly	W 61–49	15–14 (5–8)	Mott Athletics Center (1,935); San Luis Obispo, CA
February 27, 2020; 8:00 p.m., BigWest.TV		UC Santa Barbara	L 60–65	15–15 (5–9)	SRC Arena (607); Riverside, CA
February 29, 2020; 9:00 p.m., Spectrum Sports HI		at Hawaii	W 49–43	16–15 (6–9)	Stan Sheriff Center (6,884); Honolulu, HI
March 7, 2020; 7:00 p.m., BigWest.TV		UC Davis	W 66–61	17–15 (7–9)	SRC Arena (879); Riverside, CA
Big West tournament
March 12, 2020; 2:30 p.m., ESPN3	(6)	vs. (3) UC Santa Barbara; Quarterfinals	Cancelled due to the COVID-19 pandemic		Honda Center; Anaheim, CA
*Non-conference game. ^{#}Rankings from AP poll. (#) Tournament seedings in parentheses. All times are in Pacific.
