= 2019–20 Cal State Fullerton Titans men's basketball team =

American college basketball season

2019–20 Cal State Fullerton Titans men's basketball
- Conference: Big West Conference
- Record: 11–20 (6–10 Big West)
- Head coach: Dedrique Taylor (7th season)
- Associate head coach: Gus Argenal
- Assistant coaches: Brandon Dunson; Anthony Santos
- Home arena: Titan Gym (Capacity: 4,000)

2019–20 Big West men's basketball standings
	Conf.				Overall
Team	W		L	PCT	W		L	PCT
UC Irvine	13	–	3	.813	21	–	11	.656
Cal State Northridge	10	–	6	.625	15	–	17	.469
UC Santa Barbara	10	–	6	.625	21	–	10	.677
Hawai'i	8	–	8	.500	17	–	13	.567
UC Davis	8	–	8	.500	14	–	18	.438
UC Riverside	7	–	9	.438	17	–	15	.531
Cal State Fullerton	6	–	10	.375	11	–	20	.355
Long Beach State	6	–	10	.375	11	–	21	.344
Cal Poly	4	–	12	.250	7	–	23	.233
Note: The 2020 Big West tournament was canceled due to the COVID-19 pandemic.

The 2019–20 Cal State Fullerton Titans men's basketball team represented California State University, Fullerton in the 2019–20 NCAA Division I men's basketball season. The Titans, led by seventh-year head coach Dedrique Taylor, played their home games at the Titan Gym in Fullerton, California as members of the Big West Conference. They finished the season 11–20, 6–10 in Big West play to finish in a tie for seventh place. They were set to be the No. 7 seed in the Big West tournament. However, the Big West tournament was canceled amid the COVID-19 pandemic.

== Previous season ==
The Titans finished the 2018–19 season 16–18 overall, 10–6 in Big West play, finishing in a tie for 2nd place. In the Big West tournament, they defeated UC Davis in the quarterfinals, and UC Santa Barbara in the semifinals, advancing to the championship game against top-seeded UC Irvine, in an attempt to reach the NCAA tournament for the second successive year; however, the Titans were handily defeated by the Anteaters, 92–64, in a rematch of the previous year's championship. They were invited to the CIT, where they fell to Cal State Bakersfield in the first round.

== Roster ==
2019–20 Cal State Fullerton Titans men's basketball team
Players
Coaches

Pos.	#	Name	Height	Weight	Year	Previous school	Hometown
G	0	Joshua Jones Jr.	6 ft 6 in (1.98 m)	190 lb (86 kg)	Fr	Lynwood High School	Del Amo, California
G	1	Brandon Kamga	6 ft 5 in (1.96 m)	215 lb (98 kg)	Sr	High Point	Reston, Virginia
G	2	Daniel Venzant	5 ft 10 in (1.78 m)	169 lb (77 kg)	RS So	Midland High School	Midland, Texas
G	3	Doctor Bradley	6 ft 7 in (2.01 m)	185 lb (84 kg)	Fr	Junípero Serra High School	Gardena, California
F	5	Davon Clare	6 ft 6 in (1.98 m)	220 lb (100 kg)	Sr	Harker Heights High School	Killeen, Texas
G	10	Austen Awosika	6 ft 3 in (1.91 m)	193 lb (88 kg)	Sr	Ayala High School	Carson, California
G	12	Mojus Mojus	6 ft 4 in (1.93 m)	175 lb (79 kg)	Fr	Balboa School	San Diego, California
F	13	Vincent Lee	6 ft 8 in (2.03 m)	230 lb (104 kg)	RS Fr	Nevada	Midlothian, Texas
G	14	Raul Torres	6 ft 1 in (1.85 m)	180 lb (82 kg)	Fr	Mater Dei High School	Santa Ana, California
F	15	Emmanuel Taban	6 ft 7 in (2.01 m)	171 lb (78 kg)	Fr	Apollo High School	Phoenix, Arizona
G	23	Tory San Antonio	6 ft 3 in (1.91 m)	165 lb (75 kg)	Fr	Rancho Verde High School	Moreno Valley, California
F	24	Josh Pitts	6 ft 9 in (2.06 m)	262 lb (119 kg)	Jr	Memorial High School	San Antonio, Texas
F	33	Johnny Wang	6 ft 9 in (2.06 m)	240 lb (109 kg)	Jr	Santa Margarita Catholic High School	Beijing, China
F	34	Jackson Rowe	6 ft 7 in (2.01 m)	210 lb (95 kg)	Sr	Wasatch Academy	Toronto, Canada
G	35	Wayne Arnold	6 ft 4 in (1.93 m)	170 lb (77 kg)	So	Dominguez High School	Los Angeles, California
G	41	Cameron Carter	6 ft 2 in (1.88 m)	180 lb (82 kg)	Fr	Damonte Ranch High School	Reno, Nevada

Head coach

- Dedrique Taylor (UC Davis)

Assistant coach(es)

- Gus Argenal (UC Davis)
- Brandon Dunson (Arizona State)
- Anthony Santos (Cal State Fullerton)

Legend

- (C) Team captain
- (S) Suspended
- (I) Ineligible
- (W) Walk-on
- Injured
- Current redshirt

Roster
Last update: January 8, 2020

== Schedule and results ==
Date time, TV	Rank^{#}	Opponent^{#}	Result	Record	Site (attendance) city, state
Exhibition
October 31, 2019*; 6:00 pm		Cal State Dominguez Hills	L 76–83		Titan Gym; Fullerton, CA
Non-conference regular season
November 5, 2019*; 6:00 pm, BYUtv		at BYU	L 58–76	0–1	Marriott Center (11,116); Provo, UT
November 9, 2019*; 8:00 pm, P12N		at Stanford	L 54–70	0–2	Maples Pavilion (2,756); Stanford, CA
November 13, 2019*; 6:00 pm		at Wyoming	W 60–53	1–2	Arena-Auditorium (3,003); Laramie, WY
November 16, 2019*; 8:00 pm		Stanislaus State	W 82–62	2–2	Titan Gym (1,971); Fullerton, CA
November 24, 2019*; 5:00 pm		Hofstra	L 57–79	2–3	Titan Gym (588); Fullerton, CA
November 27, 2019*; 4:30 pm		vs. Southeast Missouri State; Cable Car Classic	W 64–57	3–3	Leavey Center (912); Santa Clara, CA
November 29, 2019*; 4:30 pm		vs. Denver; Cable Car Classic	L 62–65	3–4	Leavey Center (1,009); Santa Clara, CA
November 30, 2019*; 3:30 pm		at Santa Clara; Cable Car Classic	L 55–70	3–5	Leavey Center (993); Santa Clara, CA
December 4, 2019*; 7:00 pm		at Pacific	L 59–62	3–6	Alex G. Spanos Center (1,534); Stockton, CA
December 7, 2019*; 6:00 pm		Sacramento State	L 59–62	3–7	Titan Gym (576); Fullerton, CA
December 11, 2019*; 7:00 pm		San Diego	L 54–66	3–8	Titan Gym (723); Fullerton, CA
December 14, 2019*; 2:00 pm		San Francisco	L 69–91	3–9	Titan Gym (601); Fullerton, CA
December 22, 2019*; 1:00 pm		at Loyola Marymount	L 46–53	3–10	Gersten Pavilion; Los Angeles, CA
December 28, 2019*; 2:00 pm, P12N		at UCLA	W 77–74	4–10	Pauley Pavilion (6,418); Los Angeles, CA
January 3, 2020*; 7:00 pm		St. Katherine	W 103–52	5–10	Titan Gym (595); Fullerton, CA
Big West regular season
January 9, 2020; 7:00 pm, ESPN3		Hawaii	L 69–75	5–11 (0–1)	Titan Gym (693); Fullerton, CA
January 11, 2020; 5:00 pm		at UC Riverside	L 59–65	5–12 (0–2)	SRC Arena (620); Riverside, CA
January 15, 2020; 7:00 pm, ESPN3		UC Irvine	L 61–74	5–13 (0–3)	Titan Gym (687); Fullerton, CA
January 18, 2020; 4:30 pm		at Long Beach State	W 66–62	6–13 (1–3)	Walter Pyramid (2,179); Long Beach, CA
January 22, 2020; 7:00 pm		at UC Davis	W 78–74	7–13 (2–3)	The Pavilion (1,078); Davis, CA
January 25, 2020; 7:30 pm		Cal State Northridge	W 82–75	8–13 (3–3)	Titan Gym (941); Fullerton, CA
January 30, 2020; 7:00 pm		at Cal Poly	L 100–101 ^{OT}	8–14 (3–4)	Mott Athletics Center (1,483); San Luis Obispo, CA
February 1, 2020; 7:30 pm, KDOC-TV		at UC Irvine	L 61–91	8–15 (3–5)	Bren Events Center (2,780); Irvine, CA
February 5, 2020; 7:00 pm, ESPN3		UC Riverside	W 61–48	9–15 (4–5)	Titan Gym (790); Fullerton, CA
February 8, 2020; 7:30 pm, ESPN3		UC Davis	L 81–87	9–16 (4–6)	Titan Gym (809); Fullerton, CA
February 15, 2020; 6:00 pm, ESPN3		Cal Poly	W 105–101 ^{4OT}	10–16 (5–6)	Titan Gym (692); Fullerton, CA
February 20, 2020; 7:00 pm		UC Santa Barbara	L 66–75	10–17 (5–7)	Titan Gym (789); Fullerton, CA
February 27, 2020; 10:00 pm, Spectrum Sports HI		at Hawaii	L 59–70	10–18 (5–8)	Stan Sheriff Center (5,322); Honolulu, HI
February 29, 2020; 7:00 pm		at Cal State Northridge	L 92–99	10–19 (5–9)	Matadome (636); Northridge, CA
March 5, 2020; 7:00 pm		at UC Santa Barbara	L 53–55	10–20 (5–10)	The Thunderdome (1,079); Santa Barbara, CA
March 7, 2020; 7:30 pm		Long Beach State	W 75–69	11–20 (6–10)	Titan Gym (1,821); Fullerton, CA
Big West tournament
March 12, 2020; 12:00 pm, ESPN3	(7)	vs. (2) Cal State Northridge; Quarterfinals	Cancelled due to the COVID-19 pandemic		Honda Center; Anaheim, CA
*Non-conference game. ^{#}Rankings from AP Poll. (#) Tournament seedings in parentheses. All times are in Pacific.
