= 2019–20 Hawaii Rainbow Warriors basketball team =

College basketball team

2019–20 Hawaii Rainbow Warriors basketball
- Conference: Big West Conference
- Record: 17–13 (8–8 Big West)
- Head coach: Eran Ganot (5th season); Chris Gerlufsen (acting, November 6–December 28th)
- Assistant coaches: Chris Gerlufsen; John Montgomery; Jabari Trotter
- Captains: Drew Buggs; Zigmars Raimo
- Home arena: Stan Sheriff Center

2019–20 Big West men's basketball standings
	Conf.				Overall
Team	W		L	PCT	W		L	PCT
UC Irvine	13	–	3	.813	21	–	11	.656
Cal State Northridge	10	–	6	.625	15	–	17	.469
UC Santa Barbara	10	–	6	.625	21	–	10	.677
Hawai'i	8	–	8	.500	17	–	13	.567
UC Davis	8	–	8	.500	14	–	18	.438
UC Riverside	7	–	9	.438	17	–	15	.531
Cal State Fullerton	6	–	10	.375	11	–	20	.355
Long Beach State	6	–	10	.375	11	–	21	.344
Cal Poly	4	–	12	.250	7	–	23	.233
Note: The 2020 Big West tournament was canceled due to the COVID-19 pandemic.

The 2019–20 Hawaii Rainbow Warriors basketball team represented the University of Hawaiʻi at Mānoa during the 2019–20 NCAA Division I men's basketball season. The Rainbow Warriors, led by fifth-year head coach Eran Ganot, played their home games at the Stan Sheriff Center in Honolulu, Hawaii. Hawaii was a member of the Big West Conference, and participated in their eighth season in that league. On November 6, Ganot took a temporary leave of absence to deal with an undisclosed medical issue. He returned to coaching on December 29 for their game against Maine. First year assistant Chris Gerlufsen served as acting head coach from November 6 to December 28, compiling an 8–5 record. They finished the season 17–13, 8–8 in Big West play to finish in a tie for fourth place. They were set to be the No. 4 seed in the Big West tournament. However, the Big West tournament was canceled amid the COVID-19 pandemic.

== Departures ==
Name	Number	Pos.	Height	Weight	Year	Hometown	Reason for departure
Leland Green	0	G	6'2"	185	Junior	Los Angeles, California	Transferred to Humboldt State
Brocke Stepteau	2	G	5'9"	170	Senior	Dallas, Texas	Graduated
Brandon Thomas	4	G	6'4"	175	Sophomore	Los Angeles, California	Departed Program
Jack Purchase	12	F	6'9"	220	Senior	Melbourne, Australia	Graduated
Sheriff Drammeh	23	G	6'3"	160	Senior	Stockholm, Sweden	Graduated
Hutifah Abdeljawad	24	G	6'0"	160	Sophomore	Honolulu, Hawaii	Departed Program

=== Incoming transfers ===
Name	Number	Pos.	Height	Weight	Year	Hometown	Notes
Ahmed Ali	23	G	5'11"	165	Senior	Toronto, Ontario	Transferred from Washington State

== 2019 Commitments ==
College recruiting information
Name	Hometown	School	Height	Weight	Commit date
Garrett Carson; F	San Francisco, California	St. Ignatius College Prep	6 ft 6 in (1.98 m)	200 lb (91 kg)	
Garrett Carson; F	Recruit ratings: Scout: Rivals: 247Sports: ESPN:				
Bernardo Da Silva; F	Rio Das Ostras, Brazil	Wasatch Academy	6 ft 9 in (2.06 m)	200 lb (91 kg)	
Bernardo Da Silva; F	Recruit ratings: Scout: Rivals: 247Sports: ESPN:				
Kameron Ng; G	Kaneohe, Hawaii	Saint Francis School	5 ft 11 in (1.80 m)	165 lb (75 kg)	
Kameron Ng; G	Recruit ratings: Scout: Rivals: 247Sports: ESPN:				
Jessiya Villa; G	Laie, Hawaii	Kahuku High School	5 ft 11 in (1.80 m)	175 lb (79 kg)	
Jessiya Villa; G	Recruit ratings: Scout: Rivals: 247Sports: ESPN:				
Justin Webster; G	Dallas, Texas	Hargrave Military Academy	6 ft 3 in (1.91 m)	175 lb (79 kg)	
Justin Webster; G	Recruit ratings: Scout: Rivals: 247Sports: ESPN:				
Overall recruit ranking:
Note: In many cases, Scout, Rivals, 247Sports, On3, and ESPN may conflict in their listings of height and weight.; In these cases, the average was taken. ESPN grades are on a 100-point scale.; Sources: "2019 Team Ranking". Rivals.

== Roster ==
2019–20 Hawaii Rainbow Warriors men's basketball team
Players
Coaches

Pos.	#	Name	Height	Weight	Year	Previous school	Hometown
G	1	Drew Buggs (C)	6 ft 3 in (1.91 m)	195 lb (88 kg)	RS Jr	Long Beach Poly HS	Long Beach, California
G	2	Justin Webster	6 ft 3 in (1.91 m)	175 lb (79 kg)	Fr	Hargrave Military Academy	Dallas, Texas
G	3	Eddie Stansberry	6 ft 3 in (1.91 m)	190 lb (86 kg)	Sr	Archbishop Riordan HS; City College of San Francisco	San Francisco, CA
G	4	Jessiya Villa	5 ft 11 in (1.8 m)	175 lb (79 kg)	Fr	Kahuku HS	Laie, Hawaii
F	5	Bernardo da Silva	6 ft 9 in (2.06 m)	200 lb (91 kg)	Fr	Wasatch Academy	Rio das Ostras, Brazil
C	11	Mate Colina	7 ft 0 in (2.13 m)	240 lb (109 kg)	So	Lake Ginninderra HS	Melbourne, Australia
F	12	Garrett Cason	6 ft 6 in (1.98 m)	200 lb (91 kg)	Fr	St. Ignatius College Prep	Fairfield, California
F	14	Zigmars Raimo (C)	6 ft 7 in (2.01 m)	235 lb (107 kg)	Sr	Riga Secondary School No. 49	Madona, Latvia
C	15	Owen Hulland	7 ft 0 in (2.13 m)	230 lb (104 kg)	So	Lake Ginninderra HS	Adelaide, Australia
F	20	Zoar Nedd (W)	6 ft 5 in (1.96 m)	210 lb (95 kg)	RS Fr	Kapolei HS	Kapolei, Hawaii
G/F	32	Samuta Avea	6 ft 6 in (1.98 m)	195 lb (88 kg)	Jr	Kahuku HS	Hauʻula, Hawaii
G/F	42	Justin Hemsley	6 ft 5 in (1.96 m)	185 lb (84 kg)	RS So	Damien HS	Rancho Cucamonga, California
C	44	Dawson Carper	7 ft 0 in (2.13 m)	250 lb (113 kg)	So	Rampart HS	Colorado Springs, Colorado
G	50	Kameron Ng	5 ft 11 in (1.8 m)	165 lb (75 kg)	Fr	Saint Francis School	Kaneohe, Hawaii

Head coach

- Eran Ganot (Swarthmore College)

Assistant coach(es)

- Chris Gerlufsen (Randolph–Macon)
- John Montgomery (Loyola Marymount)
- Jabari Trotter (Dartmouth)

Support staff

- Jesse Nakanishi (Lewis & Clark) – Director of Basketball Operations
- Dominic Drury (St. Mary's) – Assistant Director of Basketball Operations
- Jack Rydquist (San Diego State) – Graduate Manager
- Gibson Johnson (Hawaii) – Graduate Manager

Strength and conditioning coach(es)

- Tanner Hull (Missouri)

Legend

- (C) Team captain
- (S) Suspended
- (I) Ineligible
- (W) Walk-on
- Injured
- Current redshirt

Roster
Last update: November 10, 2018

== Schedule and results ==
Date time, TV	Rank^{#}	Opponent^{#}	Result	Record	High points	High rebounds	High assists	Site (attendance) city, state
Exhibition
October 30, 2019*; 7:00 pm		Chaminade	W 83–66		19 – Raimo	14 – Carper	6 – Buggs	Stan Sheriff Center (4,467); Honolulu, HI
Non-conference regular season
November 8, 2018*; 7:00 pm, Spectrum Sports		Florida A&M; Outrigger Resorts Rainbow Classic	W 65–52	1–0	15 – Avea	9 – Avea	5 – Tied	Stan Sheriff Center (5,093); Honolulu, HI
November 10, 2019*; 5:00 pm, Spectrum Sports		South Dakota; Outrigger Resorts Rainbow Classic	L 75–81	1–1	21 – Stansberry	6 – Tied	5 – Buggs	Stan Sheriff Center (5,200); Honolulu, HI
November 11, 2019*; 5:00 pm, Spectrum Sports		Pacific; Outrigger Resorts Rainbow Classic	W 72–67	2–1	26 – Stansberry	4 – Raimo	4 – Buggs	Stan Sheriff Center (4,935); Honolulu, HI
November 15, 2019*; 7:00 pm, Spectrum Sports		Portland State	W 83–75	3–1	28 – Stansberry	14 – Raimo	7 – Raimo	Stan Sheriff Center (5,014); Honolulu, HI
November 18, 2019*; 3:00 pm, ESPNU		at Illinois	L 53–66	3–2	16 – Raimo	6 – Tied	4 – Buggs	State Farm Center (11,589); Champaign, IL
November 24, 2019*; 5:00 pm, Spectrum Sports		New Orleans	W 79–71	4–2	24 – Stansberry	9 – Raimo	4 – Tied	Stan Sheriff Center (5,188); Honolulu, HI
November 29, 2019*; 7:30 pm, Spectrum Sports		San Francisco	W 85–75	5–2	25 – Buggs	7 – Raimo	6 – Buggs	Stan Sheriff Center (6,200); Honolulu, HI
December 1, 2019*; 4:00 pm, Spectrum Sports		Hawaii Pacific	W 58–41	6–2	15 – Stansberry	5 – Tied	5 – Buggs	Stan Sheriff Center (5,838); Honolulu, HI
December 7, 2019*; 2:00 pm, P12N		at No. 13 Oregon	L 64–89	6–3	24 – Stansberry	5 – Tied	8 – Buggs	Matthew Knight Arena (6,599); Eugene, OR
December 15, 2019*; 3:30 pm, Spectrum Sports		Samford	W 94–73	7–3	23 – Stansberry	11 – Raimo	8 – Raimo	Stan Sheriff Center (5,014); Honolulu, HI
December 22, 2019*; 6:30 pm, ESPN2		UTEP; Diamond Head Classic Quarterfinals	W 67–63	8–3	17 – Da Silva	8 – Avea	8 – Buggs	Stan Sheriff Center (6,179); Honolulu, HI
December 23, 2019*; 6:00 pm, ESPN2		No. 21 Washington; Diamond Head Classic Semifinals	L 61–72	8–4	16 – Webster	15 – Raimo	9 – Buggs	Stan Sheriff Center (5,585); Honolulu, HI
December 25, 2019*; 1:30 pm, ESPN2		Georgia Tech; Diamond Head Classic 3rd Place Game	L 53–70	8–5	9 – Tied	5 – Tied	4 – Tied	Stan Sheriff Center (6,356); Honolulu, HI
December 29, 2019*; 5:00 pm, Spectrum Sports		Maine	W 91–51	9–5	21 – Stansberry	8 – Raimo	7 – Buggs	Stan Sheriff Center (5,036); Honolulu, HI
Big West regular season
January 9, 2020; 5:00 pm, ESPN3		at Cal State Fullerton	W 75–69	10–5 (1–0)	25 – Stansberry	10 – Da Silva	4 – Buggs	Titan Gym (693); Fullerton, CA
January 11, 2020; 5:00 pm, ESPN3		at UC Irvine	L 60–74	10–6 (1–1)	14 – Avea	6 – Tied	4 – Raimo	Bren Events Center (2,938); Irvine, CA
January 16, 2020; 8:00 pm, Spectrum Sports		Cal Poly	W 65–61	11–6 (2–1)	17 – Stansberry	14 – Raimo	5 – Buggs	Stan Sheriff Center (4,811); Honolulu, HI
January 18, 2020; 8:00 pm, Spectrum Sports		UC Santa Barbara	W 70–63	12–6 (3–1)	12 – Buggs	7 – Tied	12 – Buggs	Stan Sheriff Center (5,614); Honolulu, HI
January 25, 2020; 7:00 pm, Spectrum Sports		UC Davis	W 76–75	13–6 (4–1)	23 – Stansberry	8 – Buggs	11 – Buggs	Stan Sheriff Center (6,160); Honolulu, HI
February 1, 2020; 8:00 pm, Spectrum Sports		Cal State Northridge	W 80–75	14–6 (5–1)	22 – Stansberry	6 – Team	10 – Buggs	Stan Sheriff Center (6,553); Honolulu, HI
February 6, 2020; 5:00 pm, Big West TV		at UC Santa Barbara	L 66–76	14–7 (5–2)	13 – Hemsley	5 – Tied	9 – Buggs	The Thunderdome (1,346); Santa Barbara, CA
February 8, 2020; 5:00 pm, Big West TV		at Cal Poly	L 75–79 OT	14–8 (5–3)	20 – Carper	11 – Tied	5 – Raimo	Mott Athletics Center (2,235); San Luis Obispo, CA
February 12, 2020; 7:00pm, Spectrum Sports		Long Beach State	L 49–50	14–9 (5–4)	19 – Stansberry	9 – Webster	6 – Webster	Stan Sheriff Center (5,588); Honolulu, HI
February 15, 2020; 7:00 pm, ESPN2		UC Irvine	L 63–70	14–10 (5–5)	17 – Buggs	7 – Raimo	7 – Buggs	Stan Sheriff Center (7,591); Honolulu, HI
February 20, 2020; 6:00 pm, ESPNU		at UC Riverside	W 56–55	15–10 (6–5)	18 – Webster	8 – Avea	3 – Buggs	SRC Arena (937); Riverside, CA
February 22, 2020; 2:00 pm, ESPN3		at Long Beach State	L 60–64	15–11 (6–6)	19 – Stansberry	9 – Raimo	3 – Avea	Walter Pyramid (2,100); Long Beach, CA
February 27, 2020; 7:00 pm, Spectrum Sports		Cal State Fullerton	W 70–59	16–11 (7–6)	20 – Buggs	5 – Tied	3 – Tied	Stan Sheriff Center (5,322); Honolulu, HI
February 29, 2020; 7:00 pm, Spectrum Sports		UC Riverside	L 43–49	16–12 (7–7)	10 – Avea	7 – Avea	2 – Tied	Stan Sheriff Center (6,884); Honolulu, HI
March 5, 2020; 5:00 pm, Big West TV		at UC Davis	W 67–65	17–12 (8–7)	18 – Avea	7 – Tied	4 – Tied	The Pavilion (1,648); Davis, CA
March 7, 2020; 5:00 pm, ESPN3		at Cal State Northridge	L 82–86	17–13 (8–8)	31 – Stansberry	9 – Avea	3 – Tied	Matadome (1,624); Los Angeles, CA
Big West tournament
March 12, 2020; 6:30 pm, ESPN3	(4)	vs. (5) UC Davis; Quarterfinals	Cancelled due to the COVID-19 pandemic					Honda Center; Anaheim, CA
*Non-conference game. ^{#}Rankings from AP Poll. (#) Tournament seedings in parentheses. All times are in Hawaii–Aleutian Time..
