= 2020 Big West Conference men's basketball tournament =

- Classification: Division I
- Season: 2019–20
- Teams: 8
- Site: Honda Center; Anaheim, California
- Champions: Not awarded
- Television: ESPN3; ESPNU; ESPN2

2019–20 Big West men's basketball standings
	Conf.				Overall
Team	W		L	PCT	W		L	PCT
UC Irvine	13	–	3	.813	21	–	11	.656
Cal State Northridge	10	–	6	.625	15	–	17	.469
UC Santa Barbara	10	–	6	.625	21	–	10	.677
Hawai'i	8	–	8	.500	17	–	13	.567
UC Davis	8	–	8	.500	14	–	18	.438
UC Riverside	7	–	9	.438	17	–	15	.531
Cal State Fullerton	6	–	10	.375	11	–	20	.355
Long Beach State	6	–	10	.375	11	–	21	.344
Cal Poly	4	–	12	.250	7	–	23	.233
Note: The 2020 Big West tournament was canceled due to the COVID-19 pandemic.

The 2020 Big West Conference men's basketball tournament was to be the postseason men's basketball tournament for the Big West Conference of the 2019–20 NCAA Division I men's basketball season. It was scheduled be held from March 12 through March 14, 2020 at the Honda Center in Anaheim, California. It was cancelled on March 12 in the effort to contain the spread of the coronavirus.

== Seeds ==
The top eight conference teams were eligible for the tournament. Teams were seeded by record within the conference, with a tiebreaker system to seed teams with identical conference records. Teams were to be reseeded after the quarterfinals.

Seed	School	Conference record	Tiebreaker
1	UC Irvine	13–3	
2	Cal State Northridge	10–6	2–0 vs. UC Santa Barbara
3	UC Santa Barbara	10–6	0–2 vs. Cal State Northridge
4	Hawaii	8–8	2–0 vs. UC Davis
5	UC Davis	8–8	0–2 vs. Hawaii
6	UC Riverside	7–9	
7	Cal State Fullerton	6–10	
8	Long Beach State	6–10	

== Schedule and results ==
Game	Time	Matchup	Score	Television
Quarterfinals – Thursday, March 12
1	12:00 pm	No. 2 Cal State Northridge vs. No. 7 Cal State Fullerton	cancelled	ESPN3
2	2:30 pm	No. 3 UC Santa Barbara vs. No. 6 UC Riverside	cancelled	ESPN3
3	6:00 pm	No. 1 UC Irvine vs. No. 8 Long Beach State	cancelled	ESPN3
4	8:30 pm	No. 4 Hawaii vs. No. 5 UC Davis	cancelled	ESPN3
Semifinals – Friday, March 13
5	6:30 pm	Game 1 Winner vs. Game 2 Winner	cancelled	ESPN3
6	9:00 pm	Game 3 Winner vs. Game 4 Winner	cancelled	ESPNU
Championship – Saturday, March 14
7	8:30 pm	Game 5 Winner vs. Game 6 Winner	cancelled	ESPN2
Game times PT. Rankings denote tournament seeding. All games held at Honda Center, Anaheim, California

== Bracket ==
Quarterfinals; March 12; ESPN3
1	UC Irvine
8	Long Beach State
4	Hawaii
5	UC Davis
(Pairings are reseeded after the first round)
2	Cal State Northridge
7	Cal State Fullerton
3	UC Santa Barbara
6	UC Riverside

Semifinals; March 13; ESPN3/ESPNU (re-seeded)

Championship; March 14; ESPN2

== Attendance ==
On March 10, due to concerns over the coronavirus pandemic, the Big West Conference announced that both the Men's and Women's Tournaments would be played without paid spectators.
