= 2019–20 UC Davis Aggies men's basketball team =

American college basketball season

2019–20 UC Davis Aggies men's basketball
- Conference: Big West Conference
- Record: 14–18 (8–8 Big West)
- Head coach: Jim Les (9th season)
- Associate head coach: Kevin Nosek
- Assistant coaches: Kyle Vogt; Jonathan Metzger-Jones
- Home arena: The Pavilion (Capacity: 5,931)

2019–20 Big West men's basketball standings
	Conf.				Overall
Team	W		L	PCT	W		L	PCT
UC Irvine	13	–	3	.813	21	–	11	.656
Cal State Northridge	10	–	6	.625	15	–	17	.469
UC Santa Barbara	10	–	6	.625	21	–	10	.677
Hawai'i	8	–	8	.500	17	–	13	.567
UC Davis	8	–	8	.500	14	–	18	.438
UC Riverside	7	–	9	.438	17	–	15	.531
Cal State Fullerton	6	–	10	.375	11	–	20	.355
Long Beach State	6	–	10	.375	11	–	21	.344
Cal Poly	4	–	12	.250	7	–	23	.233
Note: The 2020 Big West tournament was canceled due to the COVID-19 pandemic.

The 2019–20 UC Davis Aggies men's basketball team represented the University of California, Davis in the 2019–20 NCAA Division I men's basketball season. The Aggies, led by ninth-year head coach Jim Les, played their home games at The Pavilion in Davis, California as members of the Big West Conference. They finished the season 14–18, 8–8 in Big West play, to finish in a tie for fourth place. They were set to be the No. 5 seed in the Big West tournament; however, the tournament was canceled amid the COVID-19 pandemic.

== Previous season ==
The Aggies finished the 2018–19 season 11–20 overall, 7–9 in Big West play, finishing in a tie for sixth place. In the Big West tournament, they were defeated by Cal State Fullerton in the quarterfinals.

== Roster ==
2019–20 UC Davis Aggies men's basketball team
Players
Coaches

Pos.	#	Name	Height	Weight	Year	Previous school	Hometown
F	0	Wes Harris	6 ft 6 in (1.98 m)	210 lb (95 kg)	So	Otero Junior College	Phoenix, AZ
G	1	Damion Squire	6 ft 0 in (1.83 m)	175 lb (79 kg)	So	Wasatch Academy	Montreal, QC
G	2	Stefan Gonzalez	6 ft 2 in (1.88 m)	195 lb (88 kg)	Sr	Saint Mary's	Pocatello, ID
F	3	Aaron Murphy	6 ft 6 in (1.98 m)	220 lb (100 kg)	Fr	Modesto Christian	Modesto, CA
G	5	Ezra Manjon	5 ft 11 in (1.8 m)	165 lb (75 kg)	Fr	Heritage HS	Brentwood, CA
F	10	Kennedy Koehler	6 ft 7 in (2.01 m)	220 lb (100 kg)	Jr	Pima Community College	Las Vegas, NV
G	11	Caleb Fuller	6 ft 5 in (1.96 m)	210 lb (95 kg)	So	Barking Abbey School	Ipswich, England
C	13	Matt Neufeld	6 ft 11 in (2.11 m)	240 lb (109 kg)	Sr	Saint Louis	Victoria, BC
G	20	B.J. Shaw	6 ft 6 in (1.98 m)	180 lb (82 kg)	RS Fr	Brewster Academy	Oakland, CA
G	22	Joe Mooney	6 ft 3 in (1.91 m)	187 lb (85 kg)	Sr	Notre Dame College Prep	Wauconda, IL
G	23	Rogers Printup	6 ft 4 in (1.93 m)	205 lb (93 kg)	Sr	Orange Lutheran HS	Orange, CA
G	24	Ade Adebayo	6 ft 4 in (1.93 m)	180 lb (82 kg)	Fr	Barking Abbey School	London, England
G	30	Cameron Ba	6 ft 3 in (1.91 m)	175 lb (79 kg)	RS Fr	St. Joseph Notre Dame HS	Alameda, CA
F	33	Oliver Gehrke	6 ft 7 in (2.01 m)	215 lb (98 kg)	Fr	Jämtland Gymnasium Wargentim	Stockholm, Sweden
G	40	Elijah Pepper	6 ft 4 in (1.93 m)	200 lb (91 kg)	Fr	Selah HS	Selah, WA

Head coach

- Jim Les (Bradley)

Assistant coach(es)

- Kevin Nosek (UC Davis)
- Kyle Vogt (Lakeland)
- Jonathan Metzger-Jones (Pacific)

Legend

- (C) Team captain
- (S) Suspended
- (I) Ineligible
- (W) Walk-on
- Injured
- Current redshirt

Roster
Last update: June 21, 2025

== Schedule and results ==
Date time, TV	Rank^{#}	Opponent^{#}	Result	Record	Site (attendance) city, state
Non-conference regular season
November 5, 2019*; 5:05 p.m., ESPN3		at Loyola–Chicago	L 48–82	0–1	Joseph J. Gentile Arena (3,244); Chicago, IL
November 7, 2019*; 7:00 p.m., BigWest.TV		William Jessup	W 109–63	1–1	The Pavilion (1,339); Davis, CA
November 14, 2019*; 3:00 p.m.		vs. Idaho; Red Wolves Classic	W 65–64	2–1	First National Bank Arena (108); Jonesboro, AR
November 15, 2019*; 5:30 p.m.		at Arkansas State; Red Wolves Classic	L 67–80	2–2	First National Bank Arena (1,176); Jonesboro, AR
November 17, 2019*; 9:00 a.m.		vs. VMI; Red Wolves Classic	L 84–89 ^{2OT}	2–3	First National Bank Arena (103); Jonesboro, AR
November 20, 2019*; 3:00 p.m.		vs. Sacramento State; Rivalry	L 51–61	2–4	Golden 1 Center (4,774); Sacramento, CA
November 23, 2019*; 1:00 p.m., TheW.TV		at Portland	L 62–72	2–5	Chiles Center (1,286); Portland, OR
November 26, 2019*; 7:00 p.m., P12N		at California	L 66–72	2–6	Haas Pavilion (3,063); Berkeley, CA
November 29, 2019*; 6:00 p.m., P12N		at Utah	L 73–77	2–7	Jon M. Huntsman Center (10,546); Salt Lake City, UT
December 4, 2019*; 5:00 p.m., Pluto TV		at Northern Arizona	W 85–66	3–7	Rolle Activity Center (434); Flagstaff, AZ
December 7, 2019*; 5:00 p.m., BigWest.TV		Northern Illinois	W 66–57	4–7	The Pavilion (949); Davis, CA
December 14, 2019*; 7:00 p.m., TheW.TV		at San Diego	L 54–58	4–8	Jenny Craig Pavilion (1,199); San Diego, CA
December 16, 2019*; 7:00 p.m., BigWest.TV		Loyola Marymount	W 67–65	5–8	The Pavilion (634); Davis, CA
December 21, 2019*; 2:00 p.m., TheW.TV		at San Francisco	L 84–93	5–9	War Memorial Gymnasium (1,745); San Francisco, CA
December 29, 2019*; 1:00 p.m., MWN		at New Mexico	L 69–74	5–10	The Pit (10,693); Albuquerque, NM
January 3, 2020*; 7:00 p.m., BigWest.TV		Holy Names	W 101–41	6–10	The Pavilion (625); Davis, CA
Big West regular season
January 9, 2020; 7:00 p.m., BigWest.TV		UC Riverside	L 59–65	6–11 (0–1)	The Pavilion (1,322); Davis, CA
January 16, 2020; 7:00 p.m., ESPN3		at Long Beach State	W 85–82	7–11 (1–1)	Walter Pyramid (1,553); Long Beach, CA
January 18, 2020; 3:00 p.m., ESPN3		at Cal State Northridge	W 66–62	8–11 (2–1)	Matadome (712); Northridge, CA
January 22, 2020; 7:00 p.m., BigWest.TV		Cal State Fullerton	L 74–78	8–12 (2–2)	The Pavilion (1,078); Davis, CA
January 25, 2020; 9:00 p.m., BigWest.TV		at Hawaii	L 75–76	8–13 (2–3)	Stan Sheriff Center (6,160); Honolulu, HI
January 30, 2020; 7:00 p.m., BigWest.TV		UC Irvine	L 65–80	8–14 (2–4)	The Pavilion (1,002); Davis, CA
February 1, 2020; 5:00 p.m., BigWest.TV		Cal Poly; Rivalry	W 66–51	9–14 (3–4)	The Pavilion (2,263); Davis, CA
February 6, 2020; 7:00 p.m., ESPN3		at UC Irvine	L 72–83	9–15 (3–5)	Bren Events Center (1,756); Irvine, CA
February 8, 2020; 7:30 p.m., BigWest.TV		at Cal State Fullerton	W 87–81	10–15 (4–5)	Titan Gym (809); Fullerton, CA
February 13, 2020; 7:00 p.m., BigWest.TV		UC Santa Barbara	W 84–75	11–15 (5–5)	The Pavilion (2,237); Davis, CA
February 15, 2020; 5:00 p.m., BigWest.TV		Cal State Northridge	W 110–98	12–15 (6–5)	The Pavilion (1,811); Davis, CA
February 20, 2020; 7:00 p.m., BigWest.TV		at Cal Poly; Rivalry	W 77–62	13–15 (7–5)	Mott Athletics Center (1,588); San Luis Obispo, CA
February 22, 2020; 7:00 p.m., BigWest.TV		at UC Santa Barbara	L 56–70	13–16 (7–6)	The Thunderdome (2,219); Santa Barbara, CA
February 29, 2020; 5:00 p.m., BigWest.TV		Long Beach State	W 77–76	14–16 (8–6)	The Pavilion (2,377); Davis, CA
March 5, 2020; 7:00 p.m., BigWest.TV		Hawaii	L 65–67	14–17 (8–7)	The Pavilion (1,648); Davis, CA
March 7, 2020; 7:00 p.m., BigWest.TV		at UC Riverside	L 61–66	14–18 (8–8)	SRC Arena (879); Riverside, CA
Big West tournament
March 12, 2020; 8:30 p.m., ESPN3	(5)	vs. (4) Hawaii; Quarterfinals	Cancelled due to the COVID-19 pandemic		Honda Center; Anaheim, CA
*Non-conference game. ^{#}Rankings from AP poll. (#) Tournament seedings in parentheses. All times are in Pacific.
