= 2020–21 West Coast Conference men's basketball season =

- League: NCAA Division I
- Sport: Men's basketball
- Number of teams: 10

Regular season
- Season champions: Gonzaga
- Runners-up: BYU
- Season MVP: Corey Kispert, Gonzaga

Tournament
- Champions: Gonzaga
- Runners-up: BYU
- Finals MVP: Jalen Suggs, Gonzaga

Basketball seasons
- ← 2019–20 2021–22 →

2020–21 West Coast Conference men's basketball standings
	Conf.				Overall
Team	W		L	PCT	W		L	PCT
No. 1 Gonzaga †	15	–	0	1.000	31	–	1	.969
No. 23 BYU	10	–	3	.769	20	–	7	.741
Loyola Marymount	7	–	5	.583	13	–	9	.591
Pepperdine	7	–	6	.538	15	–	12	.556
Pacific	6	–	7	.462	9	–	9	.500
Santa Clara	4	–	5	.444	12	–	8	.600
Saint Mary's	4	–	6	.400	14	–	10	.583
San Francisco	4	–	9	.308	11	–	14	.440
San Diego	2	–	7	.222	3	–	11	.214
Portland	0	–	11	.000	6	–	15	.286
† 2021 WCC tournament winner Rankings from AP poll

The 2020–21 West Coast Conference men's basketball season began with practices in September 2020 and ended with the 2021 West Coast Conference men's basketball tournament in March 2021. This was the 70th season for WCC men's basketball, and the 32nd under its current name of "West Coast Conference". The conference was founded in 1952 as the California Basketball Association, became the West Coast Athletic Conference in 1956, and dropped the word "Athletic" in 1989.

== Head coaches ==
=== Coaching changes ===
On March 8, 2020, it was announced that Mike Dunlap would end his tenure as head coach at Loyola Marymount. He spent six seasons as their head coach and posted a record of 81–108. During the 2018–19 season, LMU began the season with eight straight wins and reached the semifinals of the College Basketball Invitational. However, in the 2019–20 season their record was 11-21 and they only reached the second round of the WCC tournament. Soon thereafter, on March 20, Loyola Marymount announced that Stan Johnson, the associate head coach at Marquette, would become their new head coach. Johnson played college basketball at Southern Utah University and has coached at various universities in the West and Midwest. On February 5, 2021, the University of Portland announced that Terry Porter had been released as head coach and Ben Johnson had been named as interim head coach until the end of the season.

=== Coaches ===
Team	Head coach	Previous job	Years at school	Overall record	WCC record	WCC Tournament record	NCAA Tournaments	Sweet Sixteens
BYU	Mark Pope	Utah Valley	2	24–8 (.750)	13–3 (.813)	0–1 (.000)	0	0
Gonzaga	Mark Few	Gonzaga (asst.)	22	599–124 (.828)	291–31 (.904)	43–5 (.896)	20	9
Loyola Marymount	Stan Johnson	Marquette (asst.)	1	0–0 (–)	0–0 (–)	0–0 (–)	0	0
Pacific	Damon Stoudamire	Memphis Grizzlies (asst.)	5	62–68 (.477)	28–40 (.412)	1–4 (.200)	0	0
Pepperdine	Lorenzo Romar	Arizona (asst.)	3	32–34 (.485)	14–18 (.438)	4–2 (.667)	7	3
Portland	Terry Porter	Minnesota Timberwolves (asst.)	5	37–92 (.287)	7–61 (.103)	1–4 (.200)	0	0
Portland	Ben Johnson (interim)	Portland (asst.)	1	0–0 (–)	0–0 (–)	0–0 (–)	0	0
Saint Mary's	Randy Bennett	Saint Louis(asst.)	20	440–182 (.707)	219–92 (.704)	24–16 (.600)	7	1
San Diego	Sam Scholl	San Diego (asst.)	3	32–40 (.444)	9–23 (0.281)	3–2 (0.600)	0	0
San Francisco	Todd Golden	San Francisco (asst.)	2	22–12 (.647)	9–7 (.563)	2–1 (.667)	0	0
Santa Clara	Herb Sendek	Arizona State	5	64–64 (.500)	32–35 (.478)	2–4 (.333)	8	1

Notes:

- Year at school includes 2020–21 season.
- Overall and WCC records are from time at current school and are through the beginning of the 2020–21 season.

== Preseason ==
=== Preseason poll ===
2020-21 WCC Preseason Men's Basketball Coaches Poll
Rank	Team (First Place Votes)	Points
1.	Gonzaga (9)	81
2.	BYU (1)	69
3.	Saint Mary's	63
4.	Pepperdine	57
5.	San Francisco	52
6.	Santa Clara	38
7.	Loyola Marymount	33
8.	Pacific	31
8.	San Diego	16
10.	Portland	10

=== All-WCC Preseason Men's Basketball team ===
Honor	Recipient
Preseason All-WCC Team	Joel Ayayi, Gonzaga
Preseason All-WCC Team	Alex Barcello, BYU
Preseason All-WCC Team	Jamaree Bouyea, San Francisco
Preseason All-WCC Team	Kessler Edwards, Pepperdine
Preseason All-WCC Team	Corey Kispert, Gonzaga
Preseason All-WCC Team	Colbey Ross, Pepperdine
Preseason All-WCC Team	Eli Scott, LMU
Preseason All-WCC Team	Matthias Tass, Saint Mary's
Preseason All-WCC Team	Drew Timme, Gonzaga
Preseason All-WCC Team	Josip Vrankic, Santa Clara

== Rankings ==
Legend
	Improvement in ranking
	Drop in ranking
	Not ranked previous week
RV	Received votes but were not ranked in Top 25 of poll
(Italics)	Number of first place votes

		Pre/ Wk 1	Wk 2	Wk 3	Wk 4	Wk 5	Wk 6	Wk 7	Wk 8	Wk 9	Wk 10	Wk 11	Wk 12	Wk 13	Wk 14	Wk 15	Wk 16	Wk 17	Post
BYU	AP	RV	RV			RV	RV	RV			RV		RV	RV	RV	RV	RV	23T	--
BYU	C	RV	--			RV									RV	RV	RV	RV	RV
Gonzaga	AP	1 (28)	1 (57)	1 (54)	1 (54)	1 (61)	1 (62)	1 (63)	1 (63)	1 (62)	1 (62)	1 (61)	1 (55)	1 (59)	1 (60)	1 (59)	1 (61)	1 (60)	--
Gonzaga	C	2 (10)	--	1 (23)	1 (24)	1 (25)	1 (29)	1 (29)	1 (29)	1 (28)	1 (29)	1 (28)	1 (28)	1 (28)	1 (27)	1 (31)	1 (31)	1 (32)	2
Loyola Marymount	AP																		
Loyola Marymount	C																		
Pacific	AP																		
Pacific	C																		
Pepperdine	AP																		
Pepperdine	C																		
Portland	AP																		
Portland	C																		
Saint Mary's	AP																		
Saint Mary's	C	RV	--				RV	RV											
San Diego	AP																		
San Diego	C																		
San Francisco	AP																		
San Francisco	C																		
Santa Clara	AP																		
Santa Clara	C																		

== Regular season ==
=== Conference matrix ===
	BYU	Gonzaga	Loyola Marymount	Pacific	Pepperdine	Portland	Saint Mary's	San Diego	San Francisco	Santa Clara
vs. BYU	–	2−0	0−1	0−2	1−1	0−2	0−2	0−0	0−2	0–0
vs. Gonzaga	0−2	–	0−1	0−2	0−2	0−1	0−2	0−2	0−2	0–1
vs. Loyola Marymount	1−0	1−0	–	1−1	0−1	0−1	1−0	0−1	0−2	1−1
vs. Pacific	2–0	2−0	1−1	–	1−0	0−2	1−0	0−1	0−1	0−1
vs. Pepperdine	1−1	2−0	1−0	0−1	–	0−2	1–1	0−1	0−1	1−0
vs. Portland	2−0	1−0	1−0	2−0	2−0	–	0−0	1−0	2−0	0−0
vs. Saint Mary's	2−0	2−0	0−1	0−1	1−1	0−0	–	0−0	0−1	1−0
vs. San Diego	0−0	2−0	1−0	1−0	1−0	0−1	0−0	–	1−0	1−1
vs. San Francisco	2−0	2−0	2−0	1−0	1−0	0−2	1−0	0−1	–	0–1
vs. Santa Clara	0−0	1−0	1−1	1−0	0−1	0−0	0−1	1−1	1−0	–
Total	10−3	15−0	7−5	6−7	7−6	0−11	4−6	2−7	4−9	4−5

=== Early season tournaments ===
The following table summarizes the multiple-team events (MTE) or early season tournaments in which teams from the West Coast Conference participated.

Team	Tournament	Dates	Arena	Arena Location	Record	Bracketed	Finish	TV Partner
BYU	Roman Legends Classic	December 1–3, 2020	Mohegan Sun Arena	Uncasville, Connecticut	1–1	No	N/A	ESPN
Gonzaga	Rocket Mortgage Fort Myers Tip-Off	November 26–27, 2020	Suncoast Credit Union Arena	Fort Myers, Florida	2–0	Yes	1st of 4	FOX
Loyola Marymount	Minnesota MTE	November 28–30, 2020	Williams Arena	Minneapolis, Minnesota	0–2	No	2nd of 2	Big Ten Network
Pepperdine	San Diego State MTE	November 25 & 27, 2020	Viejas Arena	San Diego, California	1–1	No	2nd of 4	CBS & Pac-12 Network
Portland	U.S. Bank Portland Invitational	November 25–29, 2020	Chiles Center	Portland, Oregon	2–1	No	N/A	N/A
Saint Mary's	Bad Boy Mowers Crossover Classic	November 25–27, 2020	Sanford Pentagon	Sioux Falls, South Dakota	2–1	Yes	5th of 8	ESPN
San Francisco	Bubbleville	November 25–29, 2020	Mohegan Sun Arena	Uncasville, Connecticut	2–2	No	N/A	ESPN
Santa Clara	Bronco Invitational	November 25–28, 2020	Leavey Center	Santa Clara, California	3–0	No	1st of 4	WCC Network

=== WCC Player/Freshman of the Week ===
Throughout the year, the West Coast Conference named a player of the week and a freshman of the week as follows:

Week	Date	Player of the Week	Freshman of the Week
1	November 30, 2020	Drew Timme (Gonzaga)	Jalen Suggs (Gonzaga)
2	December 7, 2020	Andrew Nembhard (Gonzaga)	Leemet Bockler (St. Mary's)
3	December 14, 2020	Ahmed Ali (Portland)	Caleb Lohner (BYU)
4	December 21, 2020	Jalen Suggs (Gonzaga)	Jalen Suggs (Gonzaga)
5	December 28, 2020	Corey Kispert (Gonzaga)	Jalen Suggs (Gonzaga)
6	January 4, 2021	Joel Ayayi (Gonzaga)	Oumar Ballo (Gonzaga)
7	January 11, 2021	Joel Ayayi (Gonzaga)	Jalen Suggs (Gonzaga)
8	January 18, 2021	Corey Kispert (Gonzaga)	Jalen Suggs (Gonzaga)
9	January 25, 2021	Kessler Edwards (Pepperdine)	Jalen Suggs (Gonzaga)
10	February 1, 2021	Drew Timme (Gonzaga)	Jalen Suggs (Gonzaga)
11	February 8, 2021	Colbey Ross (Pepperdine)	Jalen Suggs (Gonzaga)
12	February 15, 2021	Drew Timme (Gonzaga)	Jalen Suggs (Gonzaga)
13	February 22, 2021	Eli Scott (Loyola Marymount)	Caleb Lohner (BYU)
14	March 1, 2021	Corey Kispert (Gonzaga)	Jalen Suggs (Gonzaga)

== National Awards and Teams ==
=== All-Americans ===
The following WCC players were named as national All-Americans as follows:

Player	School	Associated Press	United States Basketball Writers Association	National Association of Basketball Coaches	Sporting News	Consensus Points
Corey Kispert	Gonzaga	1	1	1	1	12
Jalen Suggs	Gonzaga	2	2	2	2	8
Drew Timme	Gonzaga	2	2	2	2	8

AP Honorable Mention:

- Joël Ayayi, Gonzaga
- Alex Barcello, BYU

=== Other National Awards ===
The following WCC players were named to national award watch lists and received awards as follows:

==== Wooden Award - Player of the Year ====
Preseason Top 50	Midseason Top 25	Late Season Top 20	Top 15 Ballot	Wooden 10 All Americans	5 Finalists
Corey Kispert, Gonzaga	Corey Kispert, Gonzaga	Corey Kispert, Gonzaga	Corey Kispert, Gonzaga	Corey Kispert, Gonzaga	Corey Kispert, Gonzaga
Colbey Ross, Pepperdine	Jalen Suggs, Gonzaga	Jalen Suggs, Gonzaga	Jalen Suggs, Gonzaga	Jalen Suggs, Gonzaga	
Drew Timme, Gonzaga	Drew Timme, Gonzaga	Drew Timme, Gonzaga	Drew Timme, Gonzaga	Drew Timme, Gonzaga	

==== Naismith Award - Player of the Year ====
Preseason Top 50	Midseason Top 30	10 Semifinalists	4 Finalists
Corey Kispert, Gonzaga	Corey Kispert, Gonzaga	Corey Kispert, Gonzaga	Corey Kispert, Gonzaga
Colbey Ross, Pepperdine	Jalen Suggs, Gonzaga	Drew Timme, Gonzaga	
Drew Timme, Gonzaga	Drew Timme, Gonzaga		
Jalen Suggs, Gonzaga			
Joel Ayayi, Gonzaga			

==== Bob Cousy Award - Point Guard ====
Preseason Top 20	Midseason Top 10	5 Finalists
Jalen Suggs, Gonzaga	Jalen Suggs, Gonzaga	Jalen Suggs, Gonzaga
Colbey Ross, Pepperdine		

==== Jerry West Award - Shooting Guard ====
Preseason Top 20	Midseason Top 10	5 Finalists
Joel Ayayi, Gonzaga	Joel Ayayi, Gonzaga	Joel Ayayi, Gonzaga

==== Julius Erving Award - Small Forward ====
Preseason Top 20	Midseason Top 10	5 Finalists	Winner
Corey Kispert, Gonzaga	Corey Kispert, Gonzaga	Corey Kispert, Gonzaga	Corey Kispert, Gonzaga

==== Karl Malone Award - Power Forward ====
Preseason Top 20	Midseason Top 10	5 Finalists	Winner
Drew Timme, Gonzaga	Drew Timme, Gonzaga	Drew Timme, Gonzaga	Drew Timme, Gonzaga

==== Kareem Abdul-Jabbar Award - Center ====
Preseason Top 20
Matt Haarms, BYU

== All-WCC Awards and Teams ==
On March 2, 2021, the West Coast Conference announced the following awards:

Honor	Recipient	School
Player of the Year	Corey Kispert	Gonzaga
Coach of the Year	Mark Few	Gonzaga
Defensive Player of the Year	Matt Haarms	BYU
Newcomer of the Year	Jalen Suggs	Gonzaga
All-WCC First Team	Joël Ayayi	Gonzaga
All-WCC First Team	Alex Barcello	BYU
All-WCC First Team	Jamaree Bouyea	San Francisco
All-WCC First Team	Kessler Edwards	Pepperdine
All-WCC First Team	Corey Kispert	Gonzaga
All-WCC First Team	Colbey Ross	Pepperdine
All-WCC First Team	Eli Scott	LMU
All-WCC First Team	Jalen Suggs	Gonzaga
All-WCC First Team	Drew Timme	Gonzaga
All-WCC First Team	Josip Vrankic	Santa Clara
All-WCC Second Team	Brandon Averette	BYU
All-WCC Second Team	Matt Haarms	BYU
All-WCC Second Team	Logan Johnson	Saint Mary's
All-WCC Second Team	Andrew Nembhard	Gonzaga
All-WCC Second Team	Khalil Shabazz	San Francisco
All-WCC Freshman Team	Jalin Anderson	LMU
All-WCC Freshman Team	Oumar Ballo	Gonzaga
All-WCC Freshman Team	Caleb Lohner	BYU
All-WCC Freshman Team	Mitchell Saxen	Saint Mary's
All-WCC Freshman Team	Jalen Suggs	Gonzaga
WCC Honorable Mention	Ahmed Ali	Portland
WCC Honorable Mention	Jeremiah Bailey	Pacific
WCC Honorable Mention	Joey Calcaterra	San Diego
WCC Honorable Mention	Dameane Douglas	LMU
WCC Honorable Mention	Daniss Jenkins	Pacific
WCC Honorable Mention	Keli Leaupepe	LMU
WCC Honorable Mention	Dzmitry Ryuny	San Francisco
WCC Honorable Mention	Jalen Williams	Santa Clara

== Postseason ==
=== West Coast Conference tournament ===
Gonzaga defeated BYU 88–78 in the Championship game to win the tournament on March 9. Mark Few was the winning coach and Jalen Suggs was named the MVP of the tournament.

=== NCAA tournament ===
BYU and Gonzaga participated in the 2021 NCAA Tournament. Gonzaga earned an automatic bid to the tournament by winning the WCC tournament and was awarded the number one overall seed. BYU was awarded an at-large selection as the 23rd overall seed and the 6-seed in the East Regional. BYU was defeated in the first round by UCLA 72–63 while Gonzaga advanced to the National Championship game eventually losing to the overall champions Baylor 86–70.

=== National Invitation Tournament (NIT) ===
Saint Mary's was selected as a 2-seed in a field of 16 teams to participate in the NIT Tournament. Saint Mary's was eliminated in the first round by 3-seed Western Kentucky 69–67.

=== College Basketball Invitational (CBI) tournament ===
Pepperdine was selected as part of the field of 8 teams to participate in the CBI Tournament. Pepperdine won the tournament by defeating Coastal Carolina 84–61 in the Championship game on March 24.
