= 2020–21 Loyola Marymount Lions men's basketball team =

Loyola Marymount University NCAA team

2020–21 Loyola Marymount Lions men's basketball
- Conference: West Coast Conference
- Record: 13–9 (7–5 WCC)
- Head coach: Stan Johnson (1st season)
- Assistant coaches: David Carter; Allen Edwards; Greg Youncofski
- Home arena: Gersten Pavilion

2020–21 West Coast Conference men's basketball standings
	Conf.				Overall
Team	W		L	PCT	W		L	PCT
No. 1 Gonzaga †	15	–	0	1.000	31	–	1	.969
No. 23 BYU	10	–	3	.769	20	–	7	.741
Loyola Marymount	7	–	5	.583	13	–	9	.591
Pepperdine	7	–	6	.538	15	–	12	.556
Pacific	6	–	7	.462	9	–	9	.500
Santa Clara	4	–	5	.444	12	–	8	.600
Saint Mary's	4	–	6	.400	14	–	10	.583
San Francisco	4	–	9	.308	11	–	14	.440
San Diego	2	–	7	.222	3	–	11	.214
Portland	0	–	11	.000	6	–	15	.286
† 2021 WCC tournament winner Rankings from AP poll

The 2020–21 Loyola Marymount Lions men's basketball team represented Loyola Marymount University during the 2020–21 NCAA Division I men's basketball season. The Lions were led by first-year head coach Stan Johnson. They played their home games at Gersten Pavilion in Los Angeles, California as members of the West Coast Conference

== Previous season ==
The Lions finished the season 11–21 overall and 4–12 in WCC play to finish in eighth place. They defeated San Diego in the first round of the WCC tournament before losing in the second round to San Francisco.

On March 8, 2020, head coach Mike Dunlap was fired. He finished at LMU with a six-year record of 81–108. On March 20, the school announced that Marquette associate head coach Stan Johnson had been named the new head coach of the Lions.

== Offseason ==
=== Departures ===
Name	Number	Pos.	Height	Weight	Year	Hometown	Reason for departure
Jonathan Dos Anjos	10	F	6'7"	202	Freshman	Curitiba, Brazil	Transferred to Florida SouthWestern State College
Deovaunta Williams	12	G	6'1"	160	Freshman	Memphis, TN	Transferred to Walters State CC
Reilly Seebold	15	G	6'1"	161	Freshman	Dallas, TX	Walk-on; left the team for personal reasons
Erik Johnansson	20	G	6'6"	185	Senior	Södertälje, Sweden	Graduated
Seikou Sisoho Jawara	21	G	6'3"	194	Freshman	Mataró, Spain	Transferred to Weber State
Lazar Živanović	22	G	6'7"	195	Freshman	Šabac, Serbia	Not on team roster
Jordan Bell	23	F	6'8"	221	RS Junior	Inglewood, CA	Graduate transferred to Pacific

=== Incoming transfers ===
Name	Number	Pos.	Height	Weight	Year	Hometown	Previous school
Kodye Pugh	5	F	6'8"	205	RS Senior	Baltimore, MD	Transferred from Stanford. Will be eligible to play immediately since Pugh graduated from Stanford.
Quentin Jackson Jr.	10	G	6'2"	180	RS Senior	Cary, NC	Transferred from Temple. Will be eligible to play immediately since Jackson Jr. graduated from Temple.

=== 2020 recruiting class ===
College recruiting information
Name	Hometown	School	Height	Weight	Commit date
Jalin Anderson; PG	Chandler, AZ	Compass Prep	6 ft 2 in (1.88 m)	210 lb (95 kg)	Jul 24, 2020
Jalin Anderson; PG	Recruit ratings: Scout: Rivals: 247Sports: (0)				
Mayoum Mayoum; SG	Melbourne, Australia	The Potter's House Christian Academy	6 ft 2 in (1.88 m)	170 lb (77 kg)	Apr 1, 2020
Mayoum Mayoum; SG	Recruit ratings: Scout: Rivals: 247Sports: (0)				
Overall recruit ranking: Scout: nr Rivals: nr ESPN: nr
Note: In many cases, Scout, Rivals, 247Sports, On3, and ESPN may conflict in their listings of height and weight.; In these cases, the average was taken. ESPN grades are on a 100-point scale.; Sources: "Loyola Marymount Lions 2020 Basketball Commitments". Rivals.; "2020 Loyola Marymount Lions Basketball Commits". Scout.; "ESPN 2020 Loyola Marymount Lions Basketball recruits". ESPN.; "Scout.com Team Recruiting Rankings". Scout.; "2020 Team Ranking". Rivals.

=== 2021 Recruiting class ===
College recruiting information (2021)
Name	Hometown	School	Height	Weight	Commit date
Lamaj Lewis; SG	Bellflower, CA	St. John Bosco High School	6 ft 4 in (1.93 m)	175 lb (79 kg)	May 13, 2020
Lamaj Lewis; SG	Recruit ratings: Scout: Rivals: 247Sports: (0)				
James Nobles; SG	Van Nuys, CA	Birmingham High School	6 ft 3 in (1.91 m)	160 lb (73 kg)	May 13, 2020
James Nobles; SG	Recruit ratings: Scout: Rivals: 247Sports: (0)				
David Elliott; SG	Van Nuys, CA	Birmingham High School	6 ft 2 in (1.88 m)	175 lb (79 kg)	May 14, 2020
David Elliott; SG	Recruit ratings: Scout: Rivals: 247Sports: (0)				
Overall recruit ranking: Scout: nr Rivals: nr ESPN: nr
Note: In many cases, Scout, Rivals, 247Sports, On3, and ESPN may conflict in their listings of height and weight.; In these cases, the average was taken. ESPN grades are on a 100-point scale.; Sources: "Loyola Marymount Lions 2021 Basketball Commitments". Rivals.; "2021 Loyola Marymount Lions Basketball Commits". Scout.; "ESPN 2021 Loyola Marymount Lions Basketball recruits". ESPN.; "Scout.com Team Recruiting Rankings". Scout.; "2021 Team Ranking". Rivals.

== Roster ==
2020–21 Loyola Marymount Lions men's basketball team
Players
Coaches

Pos.	#	Name	Height	Weight	Year	Previous school	Hometown
G/F	0	Eli Scott	6 ft 6 in (1.98 m)	232 lb (105 kg)	Sr	Chino Hills HS	Chino Hills, CA
G/F	1	Dameane Douglas	6 ft 7 in (2.01 m)	203 lb (92 kg)	RS So	San Joaquin Memorial HS	Hanford, CA
G	2	Joe Quintana	6 ft 2 in (1.88 m)	170 lb (77 kg)	RS Jr	Bonita HS	West Covina, CA
F	3	Lazar Nekić	7 ft 0 in (2.13 m)	231 lb (105 kg)	So	Tri-City Christian School	Belgrade, Serbia
F	5	Kodye Pugh	6 ft 8 in (2.03 m)	214 lb (97 kg)	Sr	Blair Academy; Stanford	Baltimore, MD
F	10	Quentin Jackson, Jr.	6 ft 2 in (1.88 m)	181 lb (82 kg)	Sr	Cape Fear Christian Academy; Temple	Cary, NC
F	11	Parker Dortch	6 ft 7 in (2.01 m)	211 lb (96 kg)	Sr	Northern Burlington HS; Kaskaskia College	Columbus, NJ
G	12	Jalin Anderson	6 ft 4 in (1.93 m)	177 lb (80 kg)	Fr	Dream City Christian HS	Jackson, TN
C	14	Mattias Markusson	7 ft 3 in (2.21 m)	265 lb (120 kg)	RS Sr	Kfum Jämtland BBK	Vasterled, Stockholm, Sweden
G	20	Anthony Yu	6 ft 2 in (1.88 m)	170 lb (77 kg)	Fr	SPIRE Academy	Foster City, CA
G	22	Luke Frasso	6 ft 5 in (1.96 m)	182 lb (83 kg)	Fr	Palos Verdes Peninsula HS	Palos Verdes, CA
G	23	Mayoum Mayoum	6 ft 4 in (1.93 m)	181 lb (82 kg)	Fr	The Potter's House Christian Academy	Melbourne, Australia
F	34	Keli Leaupepe	6 ft 6 in (1.98 m)	248 lb (112 kg)	So	Box Hill Senior	Melbourne, Australia
F	35	Ivan Alipiev	6 ft 8 in (2.03 m)	215 lb (98 kg)	Jr	Lycée Alphonse de Lamartine	Sofia, Bulgaria
G	40	L Simpson	6 ft 2 in (1.88 m)	188 lb (85 kg)	Fr	Sierra Canyon HS	Chatsworth, CA

Head coach

- Stan Johnson (Bemidji State)

Assistant coach(es)

- David Carter (Saint Mary's)
- Allen Edwards (Kentucky)
- Greg Youncofski (Kansas)

Legend

- (C) Team captain
- (S) Suspended
- (I) Ineligible
- (W) Walk-on
- Injured
- Current redshirt

Roster
Last update: November 19, 2020

== Schedule and results ==
Date time, TV	Rank^{#}	Opponent^{#}	Result	Record	Site (attendance) city, state
Non-conference regular season
November 25, 2020*; 5:00 pm		Southern Utah	W 85–83	1–0	Gersten Pavilion (0); Los Angeles, CA
November 28, 2020*; 3:00 pm, BTN		at Minnesota	L 73–88	1–1	Williams Arena (0); Minneapolis, MN
November 30, 2020*; 5:00 pm, BTN		at Minnesota	L 64–67	1–2	Williams Arena (0); Minneapolis, MN
December 4, 2020*; 7:00 pm		Long Beach State	W 85–61	2–2	Gersten Pavilion (0); Los Angeles, CA
December 7, 2020*; 5:00 pm		at UC Santa Barbara	L 58–69	2–3	The Thunderdome (0); Santa Barbara, CA
December 9, 2020*; 2:00 pm, P12N		at Stanford	Canceled due to COVID-19 issues		Maples Pavilion; Stanford, CA
December 12, 2020*; 2:00 pm		UC Santa Barbara	W 81–76	3–3	Gersten Pavilion (0); Los Angeles, CA
December 17, 2020*; 6:00 pm, Stadium		UC Irvine	W 51–48	4–3	Gersten Pavilion (0); Los Angeles, CA
December 19, 2019*; 7:00 pm		Cal Poly	W 76–52	5–3	Gersten Pavilion (0); Los Angeles, CA
December 21, 2020*; 6:00 pm		California Baptist	Canceled due to COVID-19 issues		Gersten Pavilion; Los Angeles, CA
December 22, 2020*		at Boise State	Canceled due to COVID-19 issues		ExtraMile Arena; Boise, ID
December 29, 2020*; 4:00 pm, P12N		at USC	Canceled due to COVID-19 issues		Galen Center; Los Angeles, CA
WCC regular season
January 2, 2020; 2:00 pm, WCC Network		vs. Santa Clara	Postponed due to COVID-19 issues		Kaiser Permanente Arena; Santa Cruz, CA
January 7, 2021; 5:00 pm		at Portland	Postponed due to COVID-19 issues		Chiles Center; Portland, OR
January 10, 2021; 4:00 pm		San Francisco	W 68–60	6–3 (1–0)	Gersten Pavilion (0); Los Angeles, CA
January 14, 2020; 6:00 pm, WCC Network		at San Diego	Postponed due to COVID-19 issues		Gersten Pavilion; Los Angeles, CA
January 16, 2021; 4:00 pm, NBCSBA		at Pacific	L 49–58	6–4 (1–1)	Alex G. Spanos Center (0); Stockton, CA
January 19, 2021; 6:00 pm, FS West		San Diego rescheduled from January 14	W 72–69 ^{OT}	7–4 (2–1)	Gersten Pavilion (0); Los Angeles, CA
January 21, 2021; 5:00 pm, Stadium		Saint Mary's	L 61–65	7–5 (2–2)	Gersten Pavilion; Los Angeles, CA
January 23, 2021; 4:00 pm		Santa Clara	L 69–72	7–6 (2–3)	Gersten Pavilion; Los Angeles, CA
January 25, 2021; 2:00 pm		at Portland rescheduled from January 7	W 75–50	8–6 (3–3)	Chiles Center; Portland, OR
January 30, 2021; 2:00 pm		at San Diego	Canceled due to COVID-19 issues		Jenny Craig Pavilion; San Diego, CA
February 4, 2021; 6:00 pm		at No. 1 Gonzaga	Postponed due to COVID-19 issues		McCarthey Athletic Center; Spokane, WA
February 6, 2021; 3:00 pm, WCC Network		at Saint Mary's	Canceled due to COVID-19 issues		University Credit Union Pavilion; Moraga, CA
February 11, 2021; 6:00 pm		Pepperdine	Canceled due to COVID-19 issues		Gersten Pavilion; Los Angeles, CA
February 13, 2021; 4:00 pm		Pacific	W 80–76	9–6 (4–3)	Gersten Pavilion; Los Angeles, CA
February 16, 2021; 6:00 pm		at Santa Clara rescheduled from January 2	W 76–73	10–6 (5–3)	Leavey Center; Santa Clara, CA
February 18, 2021; 6:00 pm		at San Francisco	W 68–63	11–6 (6–3)	War Memorial Gymnasium; San Francisco, CA
February 20, 2021; 12:00 pm, CBSSN		BYU	L 71–88	11–7 (6–4)	Gersten Pavilion; Los Angeles, CA
February 25, 2021; 6:00 pm		at Pepperdine	W 81–74	12–7 (7–4)	Firestone Fieldhouse; Malibu, CA
February 27, 2021; 4:00 pm		at Portland	Canceled due to scheduling changes		Gersten Pavilion; Los Angeles, CA
February 27, 2021; 7:00 pm, ESPN		at No. 1 Gonzaga rescheduled from February 4	L 69–86	12–8 (7–5)	McCarthey Athletic Center; Spokane, WA
WCC tournament
March 5, 2021; 6:00 pm, Stadium	(5)	vs. (8) San Francisco; Second round	W 70–66	13–8	Orleans Arena; Paradise, NV
March 6, 2021; 6:00 pm, ESPNU	(5)	vs. (4) Saint Mary's; Quarterfinals	L 47–52	13–9	Orleans Arena; Paradise, NV
*Non-conference game. ^{#}Rankings from AP Poll. (#) Tournament seedings in parentheses.
