= 2020–21 San Francisco Dons men's basketball team =

American college basketball season

2020–21 San Francisco Dons men's basketball
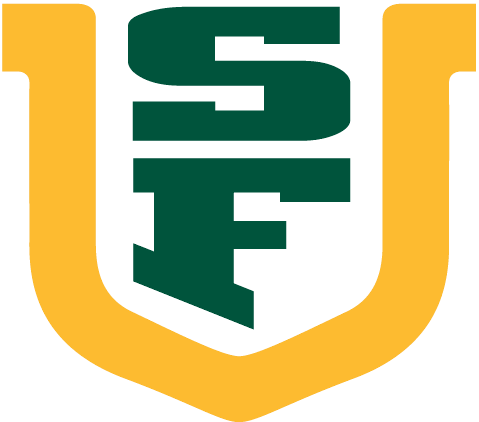
- Conference: West Coast Conference
- Record: 11–14 (4–9 WCC)
- Head coach: Todd Golden (2nd season)
- Assistant coaches: Kevin Hovde; Mamadou N'Diaye; Vinnie McGhee
- Home arena: War Memorial Gymnasium

2020–21 West Coast Conference men's basketball standings
	Conf.				Overall
Team	W		L	PCT	W		L	PCT
No. 1 Gonzaga †	15	–	0	1.000	31	–	1	.969
No. 23 BYU	10	–	3	.769	20	–	7	.741
Loyola Marymount	7	–	5	.583	13	–	9	.591
Pepperdine	7	–	6	.538	15	–	12	.556
Pacific	6	–	7	.462	9	–	9	.500
Santa Clara	4	–	5	.444	12	–	8	.600
Saint Mary's	4	–	6	.400	14	–	10	.583
San Francisco	4	–	9	.308	11	–	14	.440
San Diego	2	–	7	.222	3	–	11	.214
Portland	0	–	11	.000	6	–	15	.286
† 2021 WCC tournament winner Rankings from AP poll

The 2020–21 San Francisco Dons men's basketball team represented the University of San Francisco during the 2020–21 NCAA Division I men's basketball season. The Dons were led by head coach Todd Golden, his second year in the position. They played their home games at the War Memorial Gymnasium as members of the West Coast Conference.

== Previous season ==
The Dons concluded the 2019–20 season 22–12, 9–7 in WCC play to finish in fifth place. They lost in the quarterfinals of the WCC tournament to Pepperdine.

All postseason play was canceled due to the COVID-19 pandemic.

== Offseason ==
=== Departures ===
Name	Number	Pos.	Height	Weight	Year	Hometown	Reason for departure
Jimbo Lull	5	C	7'0"	252	Senior	Manhattan Beach, CA	Graduated
Remu Raitanen	11	F	6'9"	198	Senior	Helsinki, Finland	Graduated
Charles Minlend	14	G	6'4"	208	RS Junior	Concord, NC	Transferred to Louisville
Jordan Ratinho	25	G	6'5"	210	Senior	Livermore, CA	Graduated

=== Incoming transfers ===
Name	Number	Pos.	Height	Weight	Year	Hometown	Previous School
Julian Rishwain	5	G	6'5"	190	Sophomore	Los Angeles, CA	Boston College
Samba Kane	43	C	7'0"	220	Junior	Dakar, Senegal	Indian Hills CC

=== 2020 recruiting class ===
College recruiting information
Name	Hometown	School	Height	Weight	Commit date
Anthony Roy; SG	Oakland, CA	Dublin High School	6 ft 3 in (1.91 m)	175 lb (79 kg)	
Anthony Roy; SG	Recruit ratings: Scout: Rivals: (NR)				
Maj Dušanić; PF	Ljubljana, Slovenia	Dream City Christian School	6 ft 8 in (2.03 m)	215 lb (98 kg)	
Maj Dušanić; PF	Recruit ratings: Scout: Rivals: (NR)				
Overall recruit ranking: Scout: nr Rivals: nr ESPN: nr
Note: In many cases, Scout, Rivals, 247Sports, On3, and ESPN may conflict in their listings of height and weight.; In these cases, the average was taken. ESPN grades are on a 100-point scale.; Sources: "San Francisco Dons 2020 Basketball Commitments". Rivals.; "2020 San Francisco Dons Basketball Commits". Scout.; "ESPN". ESPN.; "Scout.com Team Recruiting Rankings". Scout.; "2020 Team Ranking". Rivals.

== Roster ==
2020–21 San Francisco Dons men's basketball team
Players
Coaches

Pos.	#	Name	Height	Weight	Year	Previous school	Hometown
G	0	Khalil Shabazz	6 ft 1 in (1.85 m)	170 lb (77 kg)	RS Jr	Rainier Beach; Central Washington	Seattle, WA
G	1	Jamaree Bouyea	6 ft 2 in (1.88 m)	180 lb (82 kg)	Sr	Palma	Seaside, CA
G	2	Justin Bieker (W)	6 ft 5 in (1.96 m)	175 lb (79 kg)	RS Fr	Jesuit	Portland, OR
F	3	Isaiah Hawthorne	6 ft 8 in (2.03 m)	205 lb (93 kg)	RS Fr	Tracy	Tracy, CA
G	5	Julian Rishwain	6 ft 5 in (1.96 m)	190 lb (86 kg)	So	Notre Dame; Boston College	Los Angeles, CA
F	10	Josh Kunen	6 ft 8 in (2.03 m)	210 lb (95 kg)	So	Centre of Excellence	Melbourne, Australia
G	11	Damari Milstead	6 ft 2 in (1.88 m)	195 lb (88 kg)	RS Jr	Moreau Catholic; Grand Canyon	Oakland, CA
G	12	Trevante Anderson	6 ft 2 in (1.88 m)	185 lb (84 kg)	Jr	Lincoln	Tacoma, WA
G	14	Anthony Roy	6 ft 3 in (1.91 m)	175 lb (79 kg)	Fr	Dublin	Oakland, CA
F	15	Maj Dušanić	6 ft 8 in (2.03 m)	215 lb (98 kg)	Fr	Dream City Christian	Ljubljana, Slovenia
F	22	Dzmitry Ryuny	6 ft 9 in (2.06 m)	205 lb (93 kg)	Jr	Central Park Christian	Minsk, Belarus
C	31	Jonas Visser	6 ft 10 in (2.08 m)	240 lb (109 kg)	So	Centre for Sports & Education	Amsterdam, Netherlands
F	34	Taavi Jurkatamm	6 ft 9 in (2.06 m)	210 lb (95 kg)	Sr	Audentes Sports Gymnasium	Tallinn, Estonia
C	43	Samba Kane	7 ft 0 in (2.13 m)	220 lb (100 kg)	Jr	Illinois; Indian Hills	Dakar, Senegal
G	45	Emmanuel Nwabueze (W) (redshirt)	6 ft 3 in (1.91 m)	215 lb (98 kg)	RS Jr	International	San Francisco, CA

Head coach

- Todd Golden (Saint Mary's)

Assistant coach(es)

- Kevin Hovde (Richmond)
- Mamadou N'Diaye (Auburn)
- Vinnie McGhee (Cal State Northridge)

Legend

- (C) Team captain
- (S) Suspended
- (I) Ineligible
- (W) Walk-on
- Injured
- Current redshirt

Roster

== Schedule and results ==
Date time, TV	Rank^{#}	Opponent^{#}	Result	Record	High points	High rebounds	High assists	Site (attendance) city, state
Non-conference regular season
November 25, 2020*; 1:00 pm		vs. UMass Lowell; Bubbleville	L 68–76	0–1	31 – Shabazz	6 – Kane	4 – Bouyea	Mohegan Sun Arena (0); Uncasville, CT
November 26, 2020*; 12:30 pm		vs. Towson; Bubbleville	W 79–68	1–1	20 – Bouyea	10 – Ryuny	6 – Bouyea	Mohegan Sun Arena (0); Uncasville, CT
November 27, 2020*; 8:30 am, ESPN		vs. No. 4 Virginia; HomeLight Classic	W 61–60	2–1	19 – Bouyea	7 – Kunen	6 – Bouyea	Mohegan Sun Arena (0); Uncasville, CT
November 29, 2020*; 2:30 pm, ESPNU		vs. Rhode Island; Hall of Fame Tip Off final	L 71–84	2–2	22 – Bouyea	10 – Ryuny	5 – Bouyea	Mohegan Sun Arena (0); Uncasville, CT
December 2, 2020*; 6:00 pm		at Nevada	W 85–60	3–2	22 – Shabazz	7 – Kunen	5 – Milstead	Lawlor Events Center (50); Reno, NV
December 4, 2020*; 6:00 pm		at Cal Poly	W 88–60	4–2	18 – Bouyea	10 – Ryuny	5 – Bouyea	Mott Athletics Center (0); San Luis Obispo, CA
December 5, 2020*; 6:00 pm		Nevada	Canceled due to COVID-19 issues					War Memorial Gymnasium; San Francisco, CA
December 10, 2020*; 6:00 pm, WCC Network		Long Beach State	W 107–62	5–2	24 – Milstead	9 – Ryuny	6 – Milstead	War Memorial Gymnasium (0); San Francisco, CA
December 13, 2020*; 12:00 pm, P12N		at California	L 70–72	5–3	24 – Bouyea	6 – Tied	5 – Jurkatamm	Haas Pavilion (0); Berkeley, CA
December 16, 2020*; 6:00 pm, P12N		at USC	Canceled due to COVID-19 issues					Galen Center; Los Angeles, CA
December 17, 2020*; 5:00 pm, P12N		at Oregon	L 64–74	5–4	15 – Jurkatamm	7 – Ryuny	4 – Bouyea	Matthew Knight Arena (0); Eugene, OR
December 20, 2020*; 4:00 pm		vs. Grand Canyon; Far West Classic	W 68–65	6–4	22 – Shabazz	6 – Tied	3 – Tied	T-Mobile Arena (0); Las Vegas, NV
WCC regular season
December 31, 2020; 2:00 pm, WCC Network		San Diego	W 70–62	7–4 (1–0)	24 – Bouyea	8 – Tied	5 – Bouyea	War Memorial Gymnasium (0); San Francisco, CA
January 2, 2021; 7:00 pm, ESPN2		at No. 1 Gonzaga	L 62–85	7–5 (1–1)	18 – Bouyea	7 – Shabazz	3 – Shabazz	McCarthey Athletic Center (0); Spokane, WA
January 7, 2021		Pepperdine	Postponed due to COVID-19 issues					War Memorial Gymnasium; San Francisco, CA
January 7, 2021; 6:00 pm, ESPNU		Portland moved from February 11	W 88–64	8–5 (2–1)	19 – Shabazz	9 – Kunen	7 – Bouyea	War Memorial Gymnasium (0); San Francisco, CA
January 10, 2021; 4:00 pm, WCC Network		at Loyola Marymount	L 60–68	8–6 (2–2)	16 – Shabazz	6 – Tied	2 – Tied	Gersten Pavilion (0); Los Angeles, CA
January 14, 2021; 5:00 pm, WCC Network		at Portland	W 79–63	9–6 (3–2)	28 – Bouyea	11 – Kunen	5 – Kunen	Chiles Center (0); Portland, OR
January 16, 2021; 7:00 pm, ESPN		BYU	L 63–72	9–7 (3–3)	30 – Shabazz	6 – Jurkatamm	3 – Jurkatamm	War Memorial Gymnasium (0); San Francisco, CA
January 21, 2021; 7:00 pm, NBCSCA		at Santa Clara	W 73–50	10–7 (4–3)	22 – Shabazz	11 – Jurkatamm	4 – Bouyea	Kaiser Permanente Arena (0); Santa Cruz, CA
January 23, 2021; 4:00 pm, CBSSN		Saint Mary's	L 63–67	10–8 (4–4)	21 – Bouyea	11 – Jurkatamm	4 – Bouyea	War Memorial Gymnasium (0); San Francisco, CA
January 30, 2021; 8:00 pm, CBSSN		at BYU	Postponed due to COVID-19 issues					Marriott Center; Provo, UT
February 4, 2021; 8:00 pm, ESPN2		at Pacific	Postponed due to COVID-19 issues					Alex G. Spanos Center; Stockton, CA
February 8, 2021; 1:00 pm, Stadium		at Pepperdine	Canceled due to COVID-19 issues					Firestone Fieldhouse; Malibu, CA
February 10, 2021; 2:00 pm, NBC Sports Bay Area		Pepperdine rescheduled from January 7	L 68–76	10–9 (4–5)	20 – Shabazz	8 – Kunen	3 – Kunen	War Memorial Gymnasium (0); San Francisco, CA
February 13, 2021; 3:00 pm, ESPN2		No. 1 Gonzaga	L 61–100	10–10 (4–6)	14 – Tied	5 – Tied	3 – Bouyea	War Memorial Gymnasium (0); San Francisco, CA
February 18, 2021; 6:00 pm, NBC Sports Bay Area		Loyola Marymount	L 63–68	10–11 (4–7)	33 – Bouyea	5 – Kunen	3 – Tied	War Memorial Gymnasium (0); San Francisco, CA
February 25, 2021		Saint Mary's	Canceled due to scheduling changes					University Credit Union Pavilion; Moraga, CA
February 25, 2021; 6:00 pm, CBSSN		at BYU rescheduled from January 30	L 73–79	10–12 (4–8)	25 – Rishwain	5 – Rishwain	4 – Bouyea	Marriott Center (0); Provo, UT
February 27, 2021		Santa Clara	Canceled due to scheduling changes					War Memorial Gymnasium; San Francisco, CA
February 27, 2021; 7:00 pm, NBC Sports Bay Area		at Pacific rescheduled from February 4	L 69–76	10–13 (4–9)	22 – Bouyea	10 – Bouyea	3 – Shabazz	Alex G. Spanos Center (0); Stockton, CA
WCC tournament
March 4, 2021; 6:00 pm, Stadium	(8)	vs. (9) San Diego; First round	W 67–51	11–13	18 – Bouyea	9 – Ryuny	6 – Bouyea	Orleans Arena; Paradise, NV
March 5, 2021; 9:30 pm, Stadium	(8)	vs. (5) Loyola Marymount; Second round	L 66–70	11–14	19 – Ryuny	6 – Bouyea	7 – Bouyea	Orleans Arena; Paradise, NV
*Non-conference game. ^{#}Rankings from AP Poll. (#) Tournament seedings in parentheses. All times are in Pacific Time.
