= 2020–21 Saint Mary's Gaels men's basketball team =

American college basketball season

2020–21 Saint Mary's Gaels men's basketball

NIT, First Round
- Conference: West Coast Conference
- Record: 14–10 (4–6 WCC)
- Head coach: Randy Bennett (20th season)
- Assistant coaches: Marcus Schroeder; Justin Joyner; Mickey McConnell
- Home arena: University Credit Union Pavilion

2020–21 West Coast Conference men's basketball standings
	Conf.				Overall
Team	W		L	PCT	W		L	PCT
No. 1 Gonzaga †	15	–	0	1.000	31	–	1	.969
No. 23 BYU	10	–	3	.769	20	–	7	.741
Loyola Marymount	7	–	5	.583	13	–	9	.591
Pepperdine	7	–	6	.538	15	–	12	.556
Pacific	6	–	7	.462	9	–	9	.500
Santa Clara	4	–	5	.444	12	–	8	.600
Saint Mary's	4	–	6	.400	14	–	10	.583
San Francisco	4	–	9	.308	11	–	14	.440
San Diego	2	–	7	.222	3	–	11	.214
Portland	0	–	11	.000	6	–	15	.286
† 2021 WCC tournament winner Rankings from AP poll

The 2020–21 Saint Mary's Gaels men's basketball team represented Saint Mary's College of California during the 2020–21 NCAA Division I men's basketball season. The team were led by head coach Randy Bennett in his 20th season at Saint Mary's. The Gaels played their home games at the University Credit Union Pavilion in Moraga, California as members of the West Coast Conference. They finished the season 14-10, 4-6 to finish in 7th place. They defeated Pepperdine in the quarterfinals in the WCC Tournament before losing in the semifinals to Gonzaga. They received an invitation to the NIT where they lost in the first round to Western Kentucky.

== Previous season ==
The Gaels finished the 2019–20 season 26–8, 11–5 in WCC play to finish in a tie for third place. They defeated Pepperdine and BYU to advance to the championship game of the WCC tournament where they lost to Gonzaga. Despite being a virtual lock to receive an at-large bid to NCAA tournament, all postseason play was cancelled amid the COVID-19 pandemic.

== Offseason ==
=== Departures ===
Name	Number	Pos.	Height	Weight	Year	Hometown	Reason for departure
Tanner Krebs	00	G	6'6"	205	RS Senior	Hobart, Australia	Graduated/Signed to play professionally with Brisbane Bullets
Jordan Ford	3	G	6'1"	175	Senior	Folsom, CA	Graduated
Jock Perry	5	C	7'1"	250	RS Junior	Melbourne, Australia	Graduate transferred to UC Riverside
Elijah Thomas	10	F	6'5"	220	RS Junior	Peroia, AZ	Graduated transferred to Cal Baptist
Dan Sheets	15	F	6'5"	205	RS Senior	San Ramon, CA	Walk-on; graduated
Kristers Zoriks	23	G	6'4"	190	RS Sophomore	Dobele, Latvia	Signed to play professionally with BK VEF Rīga
Malik Fitts	24	F	6'8"	230	RS Junior	Rancho Cucamoga, CA	Declare for 2020 NBA draft
Aaron Menzies	41	C	7'3"	265	RS Senior	Manchester, England	Graduated

=== Incoming transfers ===
Name	Number	Pos.	Height	Weight	Year	Hometown	Previous school
Matt Van Komen	23	C	7'4"	220	Sophomore	Pleasant Grove, UT	Transferred from Utah. Van Komen is granted a waiver for immediate eligibility. Will have three years of remaining eligibility.

=== 2020 recruiting class ===
College recruiting information
Name	Hometown	School	Height	Weight	Commit date
Judah Brown; SF	Santa Monica, CA	Pacifica Christian High School	6 ft 7 in (2.01 m)	180 lb (82 kg)	Jan 7, 2019
Judah Brown; SF	Recruit ratings: (79)				
Jabe Mullins; SG	Snoqualmie, WA	Mount Si High School	6 ft 5 in (1.96 m)	195 lb (88 kg)	Sep 25, 2019
Jabe Mullins; SG	Recruit ratings: No ratings found				
Mitchell Saxen; SG	Seattle, WA	Ingraham High School	6 ft 5 in (1.96 m)	195 lb (88 kg)	Sep 18, 2019
Mitchell Saxen; SG	Recruit ratings: No ratings found				
Leemet Böckler; SG	Tallinn, Estonia	TalTech Basketball	6 ft 6 in (1.98 m)	215 lb (98 kg)	Mar 20, 2020
Leemet Böckler; SG	Recruit ratings: No ratings found				
Overall recruit ranking: Scout: nr Rivals: nr ESPN: nr
Note: In many cases, Scout, Rivals, 247Sports, On3, and ESPN may conflict in their listings of height and weight.; In these cases, the average was taken. ESPN grades are on a 100-point scale.; Sources: "ESPN". ESPN.; "2020 Team Ranking". Rivals.

=== 2021 recruiting class ===
College recruiting information (2021)
Name	Hometown	School	Height	Weight	Commit date
Chris Howell #38 PF	San Marcos, CA	Torrey Pines High School	6 ft 5 in (1.96 m)	185 lb (84 kg)	Sep 25, 2020
Chris Howell #38 PF	Recruit ratings: Scout: Rivals: (81)				
Overall recruit ranking: Scout: nr Rivals: nr ESPN: nr
Note: In many cases, Scout, Rivals, 247Sports, On3, and ESPN may conflict in their listings of height and weight.; In these cases, the average was taken. ESPN grades are on a 100-point scale.; Sources: "ESPN". ESPN.; "2021 Team Ranking". Rivals.

== Roster ==
2020–21 Saint Mary's Gaels men's basketball team
Players
Coaches

Pos.	#	Name	Height	Weight	Year	Previous school	Hometown
G	0	Logan Johnson	6 ft 2 in (1.88 m)	170 lb (77 kg)	Jr	Saint Francis HS; Cincinnati	Mountain View, California
G	2	Quinn Clinton	6 ft 3 in (1.91 m)	185 lb (84 kg)	RS So	Christchurch Boys HS	Christchurch, New Zealand
G	5	Jabe Mullins	6 ft 5 in (1.96 m)	190 lb (86 kg)	RS Fr	Mount Si HS	Snoqualmie, Washington
C	10	Mitchell Saxen	6 ft 10 in (2.08 m)	230 lb (104 kg)	Fr	Ingraham HS	Seattle, Washington
F/C	11	Matthias Tass	6 ft 10 in (2.08 m)	245 lb (111 kg)	Jr	Tallinn Secondary School of Science	Tallinn, Estonia
G	12	Tommy Kuhse	6 ft 2 in (1.88 m)	185 lb (84 kg)	RS Sr	Mountain View HS	Mesa, Arizona
F	14	Kyle Bowen	6 ft 8 in (2.03 m)	225 lb (102 kg)	So	Centre of Excellence	Perth, WA, Australia
C	22	Matt Van Komen	7 ft 4 in (2.24 m)	250 lb (113 kg)	So	Pleasant Grove HS; Utah	Pleasant Grove, Utah
G	23	Leemet Böckler	6 ft 6 in (1.98 m)	215 lb (98 kg)	RS Fr	Tallinn Tech	Tallinn, Estonia
F	25	Judah Brown	6 ft 6 in (1.98 m)	205 lb (93 kg)	Fr	Pacifica Christian HS	Bermuda Dunes, California
G/F	33	Luke Barrett	6 ft 6 in (1.98 m)	190 lb (86 kg)	RS Fr	Piedmont HS	Piedmont, California
F	42	Dan Fotu	6 ft 7 in (2.01 m)	225 lb (102 kg)	Jr	Rangitoto College	Auckland, New Zealand
G/F	44	Alex Ducas	6 ft 6 in (1.98 m)	215 lb (98 kg)	So	Centre of Excellence	Geraldton, WA, Australia

Head coach

- Randy Bennett (UC San Diego)

Assistant coach(es)

- Marcus Schroeder (Princeton)
- Justin Joyner (UC Santa Barbara)
- Mickey McConnell (Saint Mary's)

Legend

- (C) Team captain
- (S) Suspended
- (I) Ineligible
- (W) Walk-on
- Injured
- Current redshirt

Roster
Last update: November 19, 2020

== Schedule and results ==
Date time, TV	Rank^{#}	Opponent^{#}	Result	Record	Site (attendance) city, state
Non-conference regular season
November 25, 2020*; 11:30 am, ESPN2		vs. Memphis; Crossover Classic quarterfinals	L 56–73	0–1	Sanford Pentagon; Sioux Falls, SD
November 26, 2020*; 2:00 pm, ESPN		vs. Northern Iowa; Crossover Classic consolation 2nd round	W 66–64	1–1	Sanford Pentagon; Sioux Falls, SD
November 27, 2020*; 3:30 pm, ESPN2		vs. South Dakota State; Crossover Classic 5th place game	W 72–59	2–1	Sanford Pentagon; Sioux Falls, SD
December 1, 2020*; 7:00 pm, WCC Network		Nicholls	W 73–50	3–1	University Credit Union Pavilion; Moraga, CA
December 3, 2020*; 7:00 pm, WCC Network		Texas Southern	W 82–70	4–1	University Credit Union Pavilion; Moraga, CA
December 8, 2020*; 7:00 pm, WCC Network		UTEP	W 73–61	5–1	University Credit Union Pavilion; Moraga, CA
December 11, 2020*; 7:00 pm, WCC Network		San Jose State	W 96–61	6–1	University Credit Union Pavilion; Moraga, CA
December 15, 2020*; 7:00 pm, WCC Network		Eastern Washington	W 80–75	7–1	University Credit Union Pavilion; Moraga, CA
December 19, 2020*; 5:00 pm, WCC Network		Colorado State	W 53–33	8–1	University Credit Union Pavilion; Moraga, CA
December 22, 2020*; 6:00 pm, CBSSN		vs. San Diego State	L 49–74	8–2	Robert A. Mott Athletics Center; San Luis Obispo, CA
December 30, 2020*; 7:00 pm, WCC Network		Sacramento State	W 63–45	9–2	University Credit Union Pavilion; Moraga, CA
WCC regular season
January 2, 2021; 5:00 pm, WCC Network		Pepperdine	Postponed due to COVID-19 issues		University Credit Union Pavilion; Moraga, CA
January 7, 2021; 4:00 pm, WCC Network		at San Diego	Postponed due to COVID-19 issues		Jenny Craig Pavilion; San Diego, CA
January 9, 2021; 4:00 pm, CBSSN		Santa Clara	L 64–66	9–3 (0–1)	University Credit Union Pavilion; Moraga, CA
January 14, 2021; 8:00 pm, ESPN2		BYU	L 52–62	9–4 (0–2)	University Credit Union Pavilion; Moraga, CA
January 16, 2021; 5:00 pm, ESPN		No. 1 Gonzaga; Rivalry	L 59–73	9–5 (0–3)	University Credit Union Pavilion; Moraga, CA
January 21, 2021; 5:00 pm, WCC Network		at Loyola Marymount	W 65–61	10–5 (1–3)	Gersten Pavilion; Los Angeles, CA
January 23, 2021; 4:00 pm, CBSSN		at San Francisco	W 67–63	11–5 (2–3)	War Memorial Gymnasium; San Francisco, CA
January 28, 2021; 8:00 pm, NBCSCA		Portland	Canceled due to COVID-19 issues		University Credit Union Pavilion; Moraga, CA
January 30, 2021; 4:00 pm, WCC Network		at Pacific	Canceled due to COVID-19 issues		Alex G. Spanos Center; Stockton, CA
February 4, 2021; 4:00 pm, WCC Network		at Santa Clara	Canceled due to COVID-19 issues		Kaiser Permanente Arena; Santa Cruz, CA
February 6, 2021; 3:00 pm, WCC Network		Loyola Marymount	Canceled due to COVID-19 issues		University Credit Union Pavilion; Moraga, CA
February 8, 2021; 6:00 pm, WCC Network		at San Diego rescheduled from January 7	Canceled due to COVID-19 issues		Jenny Craig Pavilion; San Diego, CA
February 11, 2021; 8:00 pm, ESPN2		at BYU	Postponed due to COVID-19 issues		Marriott Center; Provo, UT
February 13, 2021; 5:00 pm, CBSSN		at Pepperdine	L 58–60	11–6 (2–4)	Firestone Fieldhouse; Malibu, CA
February 18, 2021; 6:00 pm, ESPN		at No. 1 Gonzaga; Rivalry	L 65–87	11–7 (2–5)	McCarthey Athletic Center; Spokane, WA
February 22, 2021; 4:00 pm, NBCSBA		Pepperdine rescheduled from January 2	W 66–61	12–7 (3–5)	University Credit Union Pavilion; San Francisco, CA
February 25, 2021		San Francisco	Canceled due to scheduling changes		University Credit Union Pavilion; Moraga, CA
February 25, 2021; 8:00 pm, ESPN2		Pacific moved from February 27	W 58–46	13–7 (4–5)	University Credit Union Pavilion; Moraga, CA
February 27, 2021; 1:00 pm, ESPN2		at BYU rescheduled from February 11	L 51–65	13–8 (4–6)	Marriott Center; Provo, UT
WCC tournament
March 6, 2021; 6:00 pm, ESPNU	(4)	vs. (5) Loyola Marymount; Quarterfinals	W 52–47	14–8	Orleans Arena; Paradise, NV
March 8, 2021; 6:00 pm, ESPN	(4)	vs. (1) No. 1 Gonzaga; Semifinals	L 55–78	14–9	Orleans Arena; Paradise, NV
NIT
March 17, 2021; 6:00 pm, ESPN2	(2)	vs. (3) Western Kentucky; First Round – Ole Miss bracket	L 67–69	14–10	Comerica Center; Frisco, TX
*Non-conference game. ^{#}Rankings from AP Poll. (#) Tournament seedings in parentheses. All times are in Pacific Time.

== Rankings ==
Ranking movements Legend: — = Not ranked RV = Received votes
	Week																			
Poll	Pre	1	2	3	4	5	6	7	8	9	10	11	12	13	14	15	16	17	18	Final
AP*	—																			
Coaches	RV																			

*AP does not release post-NCAA Tournament rankings
