= 2020–21 Pepperdine Waves men's basketball team =

American college basketball season

2020–21 Pepperdine Waves men's basketball

CBI, Champions
- Conference: West Coast Conference
- Record: 15–12 (7–6 WCC)
- Head coach: Lorenzo Romar (3rd, 6th overall season)
- Assistant coaches: Ken Bone; Curtis Allen; Gerald Brown
- Home arena: Firestone Fieldhouse

2020–21 West Coast Conference men's basketball standings
	Conf.				Overall
Team	W		L	PCT	W		L	PCT
No. 1 Gonzaga †	15	–	0	1.000	31	–	1	.969
No. 23 BYU	10	–	3	.769	20	–	7	.741
Loyola Marymount	7	–	5	.583	13	–	9	.591
Pepperdine	7	–	6	.538	15	–	12	.556
Pacific	6	–	7	.462	9	–	9	.500
Santa Clara	4	–	5	.444	12	–	8	.600
Saint Mary's	4	–	6	.400	14	–	10	.583
San Francisco	4	–	9	.308	11	–	14	.440
San Diego	2	–	7	.222	3	–	11	.214
Portland	0	–	11	.000	6	–	15	.286
† 2021 WCC tournament winner Rankings from AP poll

The 2020–21 Pepperdine Waves men's basketball team represented Pepperdine University during the 2020–21 NCAA Division I men's basketball season. The Waves are led by head coach Lorenzo Romar, in the third season of his second stint after coaching the Waves from 1996 to 1999. They played their home games at the Firestone Fieldhouse in Malibu, California as members of the West Coast Conference. They finished the season 15–12, 7–6 to finish in 4th place. They defeated Santa Clara in the quarterfinals of the WCC tournament before losing in the semifinals to BYU. They received an invitation to the CBI where they defeated Longwood, Bellarmine, and Coastal Carolina to become CBI Champions.

== Previous season ==
The Waves finished the 2019–20 season 16–16, 8–8 in WCC play to finish in sixth place. They defeated Santa Clara in the second round of the WCC tournament before losing in the third round to Saint Mary's.

== Roster ==
2020–21 Pepperdine Waves men's basketball team
Players
Coaches

Pos.	#	Name	Height	Weight	Year	Previous school	Hometown
G	0	Sedrick Altman	6 ft 2 in (1.88 m)	180 lb (82 kg)	So	Colony HS	Rialto, CA
G	2	Darryl Polk Jr.	5 ft 9 in (1.75 m)	155 lb (70 kg)	Jr	Long Beach Poly HS	Long Beach, CA
G	3	Michael Wexler (W)	5 ft 11 in (1.8 m)	175 lb (79 kg)	RS Sr	Benilde-St. Margaret's School	Plymouth, MN
G	4	Colbey Ross	6 ft 1 in (1.85 m)	185 lb (84 kg)	Sr	Eaglecrest HS	Aurora, CO
G	5	Jade' Smith	6 ft 4 in (1.93 m)	165 lb (75 kg)	RS Jr	St. Joseph Notre Dame HS	Oakland, CA
F	10	Andre Ball	6 ft 7 in (2.01 m)	190 lb (86 kg)	RS So	Chino Hills HS	Chino Hills, CA
F	12	Kendall Munson	6 ft 8 in (2.03 m)	220 lb (100 kg)	Fr	Garfield HS	Seattle, WA
G	13	Malachy Caffrey	6 ft 1 in (1.85 m)	175 lb (79 kg)	Fr	La Salle HS	Yakima, WA
G	14	Jay Yoon (W)	6 ft 4 in (1.93 m)	195 lb (88 kg)	Jr	Arcadia HS	Arcadia, CA
F	15	Kessler Edwards	6 ft 8 in (2.03 m)	215 lb (98 kg)	Jr	Etiwanda HS	Rancho Cucamonga, CA
G	22	Majok Deng	6 ft 5 in (1.96 m)	190 lb (86 kg)	RS Fr	Salpointe Catholic HS	Tucson, AZ
F	24	Kene Chukwuka	6 ft 9 in (2.06 m)	225 lb (102 kg)	Sr	Soderslatts Gymnasiet; Pittsburgh	Stockholm, Sweden
F	25	Everett Perrot (W)	6 ft 6 in (1.98 m)	215 lb (98 kg)	RS So	Christian Brothers HS	Elk Grove, CA
F	31	Jan Zidek	6 ft 9 in (2.06 m)	240 lb (109 kg)	So	Gymnasium Ota Pavel	Prague, Czech Republic
C	34	Victor Ohia Obioha	6 ft 9 in (2.06 m)	220 lb (100 kg)	Jr	Hillcrest HS	Owerri, Nigeria
G	44	Robbie Heath	6 ft 3 in (1.91 m)	180 lb (82 kg)	So	Abington HS; West Chester	Whittlesea, Australia

Head coach

- Lorenzo Romar (Washington)

Assistant coach(es)

- Ken Bone (Seattle Pacific)
- Curtis Allen (Washington)
- Gerald Brown (Pepperdine)

Legend

- (C) Team captain
- (S) Suspended
- (I) Ineligible
- (W) Walk-on
- Injured
- Current redshirt

Roster
Last update: November 19, 2020

== Schedule and results ==
Date time, TV	Rank^{#}	Opponent^{#}	Result	Record	High points	High rebounds	High assists	Site (attendance) city, state
Non conference regular season
November 25, 2020*; 3:30 pm		vs. UC Irvine	W 86–72	1–0	20 – Edwards	7 – Tied	8 – Ross	Viejas Arena; San Diego, CA
November 27, 2020*; 12:00 pm, P12N		vs. No. 22 UCLA	L 98–107 ^{3OT}	1–1	33 – Ross	6 – Tied	6 – Altman	Viejas Arena; San Diego, CA
December 2, 2020*; 5:00 pm		San Jose State	Canceled due to COVID-19 issues					Firestone Fieldhouse; Malibu, CA
December 3, 2020*; 6:30 pm		Saint Katherine	W 94–45	2–1	26 – Ross	11 – Chukwuka	9 – Ross	Firestone Fieldhouse; Malibu, CA
December 5, 2020*; 3:00 pm		Fresno State	Canceled due to COVID-19 issues					Firestone Fieldhouse; Malibu, CA
December 6, 2020*; 1:30 pm		at San Diego State	L 60–65	2–2	22 – Edwards	6 – Chukwuka	7 – Ross	Viejas Arena; San Diego, CA
December 9, 2020*; 6:00 pm, CBSSN		California	W 74–62	3–2	26 – Edwards	8 – Edwards	11 – Ross	Firestone Fieldhouse; Malibu, CA
December 12, 2020*; 1:00 pm		Cal State Northridge	L 84–89	3–3	29 – Ross	9 – Edwards	9 – Ross	Firestone Fieldhouse; Malibu, CA
December 14, 2020*; 6:30 pm		at UNLV	Canceled due to COVID-19 issues					Thomas & Mack Center; Paradise, NV
December 16, 2020*; 5:00 pm		Concordia–Irvine	W 91–68	4–3	21 – Ross	7 – Edwards	8 – Ross	Firestone Fieldhouse; Malibu, CA
December 19, 2020*; 3:00 pm		UC Santa Barbara	L 63–75	4–4	20 – Ross	7 – Ball	6 – Ross	Anaheim Arena; Anaheim, CA
December 23, 2020*; 1:00 pm		Tarleton State	Canceled due to COVID-19 issues					Firestone Fieldhouse; Malibu, CA
December 23, 2020*; 3:00 pm		Cal State Bakersfield	L 51–79	4–5	11 – Altman	6 – Munson	4 – Ross	Firestone Fieldhouse; Malibu, CA
WCC regular season
December 31, 2020; 4:00 pm, ESPN2		BYU	Postponed due to COVID-19 issues					Firestone Fieldhouse; Malibu, CA
January 2, 2021		at Saint Mary's	Postponed due to COVID-19 issues					University Credit Union Pavilion; Moraga, CA
January 7, 2021		at San Francisco	Postponed due to COVID-19 issues					War Memorial Gymnasium; San Francisco, CA
January 14, 2021; 6:00 pm, ESPN		at No. 1 Gonzaga	L 70–95	4–6 (0–1)	14 – Edwards	5 – Ohia Obioha	7 – Ross	McCarthey Athletic Center; Spokane, WA
January 16, 2021; 4:00 pm, WCC Network		Portland	W 80–65	5–6 (1–1)	21 – Edwards	9 – Edwards	10 – Ross	Firestone Fieldhouse; Malibu, CA
January 21, 2021; 6:00 pm, WCC Network		Pacific	W 85–68	6–6 (2–1)	37 – Edwards	11 – Edwards	11 – Ross	Firestone Fieldhouse; Malibu, CA
January 23, 2021; 7:00 pm, ESPN2		at BYU	L 54–65	6–7 (2–2)	21 – Ross	10 – Tied	4 – Ross	Marriott Center; Provo, UT
January 27, 2020; 12:00 pm, BYU.tv		BYU rescheduled from December 31	W 76–73	7–7 (3–2)	19 – Ross	9 – Altman	6 – Ross	Firestone Fieldhouse; Malibu, CA
January 30, 2021; 5:00 pm, ESPN2		No. 1 Gonzaga	L 75–97	7–8 (3–3)	16 – Ross	6 – Tied	7 – Ross	Firestone Fieldhouse; Malibu, CA
February 4, 2021; 6:00 pm		San Diego	Canceled due to COVID-19 issues					Firestone Fieldhouse; Malibu, CA
February 6, 2021		San Francisco	Canceled due to COVID-19 issues					Firestone Fieldhouse; Malibu, CA
February 6, 2021; 4:00 pm, Stadium		at Portland moved from February 18	W 91–70	8–8 (4–3)	24 – Ross	10 – Tied	12 – Ross	Chiles Center; Portland, OR
February 10, 2021; 2:00 pm, Prime Ticket		at San Francisco rescheduled from January 7	W 76–68	9–8 (5–3)	22 – Ross	11 – Edwards	6 – Ross	War Memorial Gymnasium; San Francisco, CA
February 11, 2021; 6:00 pm		at Loyola Marymount	Canceled due to COVID-19 issues					Gersten Pavilion; Los Angeles, CA
February 13, 2021; 5:00 pm, CBSSN		Saint Mary's	W 60–58	10–8 (6–3)	15 – Edwards	11 – Zidek	10 – Ross	Firestone Fieldhouse; Malibu, CA
February 20, 2021; 3:00 pm, Stadium		at Santa Clara	L 82–86	10–9 (6–4)	26 – Ross	9 – Zidek	6 – Ross	Leavey Center; Santa Clara, CA
February 22, 2021; 4:00 pm, Prime Ticket		at Saint Mary's rescheduled from January 2	L 61–66	10–10 (6–5)	22 – Altman	6 – Ohia Obioha	5 – Ross	University Credit Union Pavilion; Moraga, CA
February 25, 2021; 6:00 pm, Stadium		Loyola Marymount	L 74–81	10–11 (6–6)	25 – Ross	8 – Ohia Obioha	8 – Ross	Firestone Fieldhouse; Malibu, CA
February 27, 2021; 2:00 pm, Stadium		at San Diego	W 90–84	11–11 (7–6)	27 – Ross	6 – Edwards/Ohia Obioha	8 – Ross	Jenny Craig Pavilion; San Diego, CA
WCC tournament
March 6, 2021; 9:00 pm, ESPN2	(3)	vs. (7) Santa Clara; Quarterfinals	W 78–70	12–11	25 – Ross	11 – Edwards	12 – Ross	Orleans Arena (0); Paradise, NV
March 8, 2021; 9:00 pm, ESPN2	(3)	vs. (2) BYU; Semifinals	L 77–82 ^{OT}	12–12	20 – Edwards	9 – Edwards	5 – Edwards	Orleans Arena (0); Paradise, NV
CBI
March 22, 2021; 2:30 pm, FloSports		vs. Longwood; Quarterfinals	W 80–66	13–12	22 – Edwards	11 – Ohia Obioha	13 – Ross	Ocean Center (102); Daytona Beach, FL
March 23, 2021; 8:00 pm, FloSports		vs. Bellarmine; Semifinals	W 82–71	14–12	28 – Edwards	9 – Ross	8 – Ross	Ocean Center (286); Daytona Beach, FL
March 24, 2021; 5:00 pm, FloSports		vs. Coastal Carolina; Championship	W 84–61	15–12	16 – Ohia Obioha	6 – Tied	7 – Ross	Ocean Center (193); Daytona Beach, FL
*Non-conference game. ^{#}Rankings from AP Poll. (#) Tournament seedings in parentheses. All times are in Pacific Time.
