= 2020–21 Portland Pilots men's basketball team =

American college basketball season

2020–21 Portland Pilots men's basketball
- Conference: West Coast Conference
- Record: 6–15 (0–11 WCC)
- Head coach: Terry Porter (fired 2/5) (5th season; 17 games); Ben Johnson (interim) (remainder of season)
- Assistant coaches: Tyler Geving; Chris Buchanan
- Home arena: Chiles Center

2020–21 West Coast Conference men's basketball standings
	Conf.				Overall
Team	W		L	PCT	W		L	PCT
No. 1 Gonzaga †	15	–	0	1.000	31	–	1	.969
No. 23 BYU	10	–	3	.769	20	–	7	.741
Loyola Marymount	7	–	5	.583	13	–	9	.591
Pepperdine	7	–	6	.538	15	–	12	.556
Pacific	6	–	7	.462	9	–	9	.500
Santa Clara	4	–	5	.444	12	–	8	.600
Saint Mary's	4	–	6	.400	14	–	10	.583
San Francisco	4	–	9	.308	11	–	14	.440
San Diego	2	–	7	.222	3	–	11	.214
Portland	0	–	11	.000	6	–	15	.286
† 2021 WCC tournament winner Rankings from AP poll

The 2020–21 Portland Pilots men's basketball team represented the University of Portland during the 2020–21 NCAA Division I men's basketball season. The Pilots were led by fifth-year head coach Terry Porter until he was fired February 5, 2021 after 17 games. He was replaced by interim head coach Ben Johnson for the rest of the season. They played their home games at the Chiles Center as members of the West Coast Conference. In a season limited due to the ongoing COVID-19 pandemic, they finished the season 6–15, 0–11 in WCC play to finish in last place. They lost to Santa Clara in the first round of the WCC tournament.

On March 22, the school named Eastern Washington head coach Shantay Legans the team's new head coach.

== Previous season ==
The Pilots finished the 2019–20 season 9–23, 1–15 in WCC play to finish in last place. They lost in the first round of the WCC tournament to Santa Clara.

== Offseason ==
=== Departures ===
Name	Number	Pos.	Height	Weight	Year	Hometown	Reason for departure
Lavar Harewood	0	G	6'3"	205	RS Senior	Brooklyn, NY	Graduated
Malcolm Porter	1	G	6'4"	190	RS Junior	Portland, OR	Graduate transferred to Northern Arizona
JoJo Walker	2	G	6'1"	175	Junior	Carolina, PR	Left the team for personal reasons
Isaiah White	3	G	6'4"	195	RS Senior	Ellicott City, MD	Graduated
Cody Collinsoworth	11	C	7'0"	230	Freshman	Lindale, TX	Left the team for personal reasons
Theo Akwuba	12	C	6'11"	220	Sophomore	Montgomery, AL	Transferred to Louisiana
Josh Phillips	21	F	6'8"	245	Sophomore	Huntington Beach, CA	Transferred to East Los Angeles College
Jacob Tryon	24	F/C	6'11"	210	Junior	Temecula, CA	Transferred to Samford
Hugh Hogland	32	F/C	6'10"	230	RS Sophomore	Waimānalo, HI	Transferred to UC Davis

=== Incoming transfers ===
Name	Number	Pos.	Height	Weight	Year	Hometown	Previous School
Clythus Griffith	0	G	6'2"	180	RS Junior	Mississauga, ON	Junior college transferred from SW Tennessee CC
Ahmed Ali	2	G	5'11"	165	RS Senior	Toronto, Ontario	Transferred from Hawaii. Will be eligible to play immediately since Harewood graduated from Hawaii.

=== Recruiting class of 2020 ===
College recruiting information
Name	Hometown	School	Height	Weight	Commit date
Zac Triplett; SG	Melbourne, Australia	Maribyrnong College	6 ft 5 in (1.96 m)	165 lb (75 kg)	Jul 14, 2019
Zac Triplett; SG	Recruit ratings: Scout: Rivals: (0)				
Hayden Curtiss; PF	Snoqualmie, WA	Mount Si High School	6 ft 9 in (2.06 m)	205 lb (93 kg)	Mar 14, 2020
Hayden Curtiss; PF	Recruit ratings: Scout: Rivals: (0)				
Overall recruit ranking: Scout: nr Rivals: nr ESPN: nr
Note: In many cases, Scout, Rivals, 247Sports, On3, and ESPN may conflict in their listings of height and weight.; In these cases, the average was taken. ESPN grades are on a 100-point scale.; Sources: "Portland Pilots 2020 Basketball Commitments". Rivals.; "2020 Portland Pilots Basketball Commits". Scout.; "ESPN 2020 Portland Pilots Basketball recruits". ESPN.; "Scout.com Team Recruiting Rankings". Scout.; "2020 Team Ranking". Rivals.

== Roster ==
2020–21 Portland Pilots men's basketball team
Players
Coaches

Pos.	#	Name	Height	Weight	Year	Previous school	Hometown
G	0	Clythus Griffith	6 ft 2 in (1.88 m)	180 lb (82 kg)	RS Jr	St. Joseph's HS; SW Tennessee CC	Mississauga, Ontario, Canada
G	1	Zac Triplett	6 ft 5 in (1.96 m)	165 lb (75 kg)	Fr	Maribyrnong College	Melbourne, Australia
G	2	Ahmed Ali	5 ft 11 in (1.8 m)	170 lb (77 kg)	Sr	Washington State; Hawaii	Toronto, Ontario, Canada
G	3	Isiah Dasher	6 ft 3 in (1.91 m)	175 lb (79 kg)	Jr	Ferris HS; State College of FL	Jersey City, NJ
G	4	Quincy Ferebee	6 ft 1 in (1.85 m)	175 lb (79 kg)	Sr	Serra HS; Southwestern College	San Diego, CA
G	5	Miles Turner (W)	6 ft 2 in (1.88 m)	190 lb (86 kg)	RS So	Tracy HS	Tracy, CA
G	10	Chase Adams	5 ft 7 in (1.7 m)	150 lb (68 kg)	So	Link Year Prep	Chicago, IL
G	11	Latrell Jones	6 ft 5 in (1.96 m)	175 lb (79 kg)	Jr	Archbishop Shaw HS; College of Central FL	Avondale, LA
F	13	Eddie Davis	6 ft 6 in (1.98 m)	190 lb (86 kg)	Jr	Port St. Lucie HS; Colby CC	Port Salerno, FL
F	14	Tahirou Diabate	6 ft 9 in (2.06 m)	225 lb (102 kg)	Sr	Teikyo Nagaoka HS	Bamako, Mali
F	15	Hayden Curtiss	6 ft 9 in (2.06 m)	205 lb (93 kg)	Fr	Mount Si HS	North Bend, WA
G	20	Takiula Faheresohn	6 ft 7 in (2.01 m)	185 lb (84 kg)	RS Jr	Auckland Grammar	Auckland, New Zealand
F	23	Hunter Seymour	6 ft 8 in (2.03 m)	215 lb (98 kg)	Jr	Fork Union Military Academy; Cabrillo CC	Charlotte, NC
F	24	Michael Henn	6 ft 8 in (2.03 m)	225 lb (102 kg)	Sr	Bellevue HS; Cal Baptist	Bellevue, WA
F	34	Wyatt Watson (W)	6 ft 9 in (2.06 m)	195 lb (88 kg)	RS So	Sehome HS	Bellingham, WA

Head coach

- Ben Johnson (Green Bay)

Assistant coach(es)

- Tyler Geving (Central Washington)
- Chris Buchanan (Arizona)

Legend

- (C) Team captain
- (S) Suspended
- (I) Ineligible
- (W) Walk-on
- Injured
- Current redshirt

Roster
Last update: February 5, 2020

== Schedule and results ==
Date time, TV	Rank^{#}	Opponent^{#}	Result	Record	High points	High rebounds	High assists	Site (attendance) city, state
Non-conference regular season
November 25, 2020*; 8:00 pm		Seattle; Portland Invitational	L 72–84	0–1	13 – Tied	6 – Henn	3 – Henn	Chiles Center (0); Portland, OR
November 27, 2020*; 8:00 pm		Idaho; Portland Invitational	Canceled due to COVID-19 issues					Chiles Center; Portland, OR
November 28, 2020*; 12:00 pm		William Jessup; Portland Invitational	W 83–73	1–1	22 – Ali	7 – Tied	5 – Ali	Chiles Center (0); Portland, OR
November 29, 2020*; 12:00 pm		Northwest; Portland Invitational	W 74–69	2–1	18 – Ali	5 – Henn	5 – Adams	Chiles Center (0); Portland, OR
December 5, 2020*; 7:00 pm		Portland State	W 86–73	3–1	28 – Ali	10 – Jones	4 – Ali	Chiles Center (0); Portland, OR
December 10, 2020*; 4:00 pm, P12N		at Oregon State	W 87–86 ^{OT}	4–1	26 – Ali	9 – Davis	4 – Ali	Gill Coliseum (0); Corvallis, OR
December 15, 2020*; 5:00 pm		College of Idaho	W 88–74	5–1	22 – Ali	8 – Seymour	4 – Adams	Chiles Center (0); Portland, OR
December 19, 2020*; 12:00 pm, P12N		at Oregon	L 41–80	5–2	9 – Adams	6 – Curtiss	2 – Ali	Matthew Knight Arena (0); Eugene, OR
December 22, 2020*; 12:00 pm, NBCSNW		Montana State	W 62–59	6–2	19 – Davis	10 – Davis	2 – Tied	Chiles Center (0); Portland, OR
December 30, 2020*; 6:00 pm		at Seattle	L 68–84	6–3	19 – Ali	8 – Davis	4 – Ali	Redhawk Center (0); Seattle, WA
WCC regular season
January 2, 2021; 2:00 pm		at Pacific	Postponed due to COVID-19 issues					Alex G. Spanos Center; Stockton, CA
January 7, 2021		Loyola Marymount	Postponed due to COVID-19 issues					Chiles Center; Portland, OR
January 7, 2021; 6:00 pm, ESPNU		at San Francisco; Moved from February 11	L 64–88	6–4 (0–1)	17 – Dasher	6 – Jones	3 – Ali	War Memorial Gymnasium (0); San Francisco, CA
January 9, 2021; 5:00 pm, RTNW		No. 1 Gonzaga	L 88–116	6–5 (0–2)	19 – Ali	6 – Griffith	7 – Adams	Chiles Center (0); Portland, OR
January 14, 2021; 5:00 pm, WCC Network		San Francisco	L 63–79	6–6 (0–3)	20 – Davis	6 – Tied	4 – Ali	Chiles Center (0); Portland, OR
January 16, 2021; 4:00 pm, WCC Network		at Pepperdine	L 65–80	6–7 (0–4)	19 – Davis	8 – Davis	7 – Adams	Firestone Fieldhouse (0); Malibu, CA
January 21, 2021; 6:00 pm, CBSSN		at BYU	L 67–95	6–8 (0–5)	21 – Jones	4 – Tied	6 – Davis	Marriott Center (0); Provo, UT
January 23, 2021; 2:00 pm, NBCSNW		San Diego	L 70–78	6–9 (0–6)	32 – Ali	6 – Ali	5 – Adams	Chiles Center (0); Portland, OR
January 25, 2021; 2:00 pm, WCC Network		Loyola Marymount; Rescheduled from January 7	L 50–75	6–10 (0–7)	13 – Jones	3 – Davis	5 – Adams	Chiles Center (0); Portland, OR
January 28, 2021; 7:00 pm, Root Sports		at Saint Mary's	Canceled due to COVID-19 issues					University Credit Union Pavilion; Moraga, CA
January 30, 2021; 2:00 pm, WCC Network		Santa Clara	Canceled due to COVID-19 issues					Chiles Center; Portland, OR
February 4, 2021; 4:00 pm, Stadium		BYU	L 60–105	6–11 (0–8)	17 – Davis	2 – Tied	4 – Curtiss	Chiles Center (0); Portland, OR
February 6, 2021; 4:00 pm, WCC Network		Pepperdine; Moved from February 18	L 70–91	6–12 (0–9)	19 – Ali	5 – Davis	4 – Ali	Chiles Center (0); Portland, OR
February 11, 2021; 2:00 pm, WCC Network		at Pacific; Rescheduled from January 2	L 57–84	6–13 (0–10)	13 – Henn	4 – Tied	3 – Ferebee	Alex G. Spanos Center (0); Stockton, CA
February 13, 2021; 2:00 pm, WCC Network		at Santa Clara	Postponed due to COVID-19 issues					Leavey Center; Santa Clara, CA
February 20, 2021; 1:00 pm, NBCSNW		Pacific	L 58–80	6–14 (0–11)	12 – Triplett	4 – Henn	2 – Tied	Chiles Center (0); Portland, OR
February 25, 2021; 6:00 pm, WCC Network		at San Diego	Canceled due to COVID-19 issues					Jenny Craig Pavilion; San Diego, CA
February 27, 2021; 4:00 pm		at Loyola Marymount	Canceled due to scheduling changes					Gersten Pavilion; Los Angeles, CA
February 27, 2021; 7:00 pm, WCC Network		at Santa Clara; Rescheduled from February 13	Canceled due to COVID-19 issues					Leavey Center; Santa Clara, CA
WCC tournament
March 5, 2021; 9:00 pm, Stadium	(10)	vs. (7) Santa Clara; First round	L 86–95	6–15	21 – Ali	5 – Henn	5 – Ali	Orleans Arena (0); Paradise, NV
*Non-conference game. ^{#}Rankings from AP Poll. (#) Tournament seedings in parentheses. All times are in Pacific Time.

Source: Schedule
