= 2020–21 Santa Clara Broncos men's basketball team =

American college basketball season

2020–21 Santa Clara Broncos men's basketball
- Conference: West Coast Conference
- Record: 12–8 (4–5 WCC)
- Head coach: Herb Sendek (5th season)
- Assistant coaches: Jason Ludwig; Scott Garson; Ryan Madry
- Home arena: Leavey Center

2020–21 West Coast Conference men's basketball standings
	Conf.				Overall
Team	W		L	PCT	W		L	PCT
No. 1 Gonzaga †	15	–	0	1.000	31	–	1	.969
No. 23 BYU	10	–	3	.769	20	–	7	.741
Loyola Marymount	7	–	5	.583	13	–	9	.591
Pepperdine	7	–	6	.538	15	–	12	.556
Pacific	6	–	7	.462	9	–	9	.500
Santa Clara	4	–	5	.444	12	–	8	.600
Saint Mary's	4	–	6	.400	14	–	10	.583
San Francisco	4	–	9	.308	11	–	14	.440
San Diego	2	–	7	.222	3	–	11	.214
Portland	0	–	11	.000	6	–	15	.286
† 2021 WCC tournament winner Rankings from AP poll

The 2020–21 Santa Clara Broncos men's basketball team represented Santa Clara University during the 2020–21 NCAA Division I men's basketball season. The Broncos were led by fifth-year head coach Herb Sendek and played their home games at the Leavey Center as members of the West Coast Conference.

== Previous season ==
The Broncos finished the 2019–20 season 20–13, 6–10 in WCC play to finish in seventh place. They defeated Portland in the first round of the WCC tournament before losing in the second round to Pepperdine.

== Departures ==
Name	Number	Pos.	Height	Weight	Year	Hometown	Reason for departure
David Thompson	1	G	6'0"	165	Junior	Milwaukee, WI	Transferred to Central Washington
Tahj Eaddy	2	G	6'2"	165	RS Junior	West Haven, CT	Graduate transferred to USC
Trey Wertz	3	G	6'4"	185	Sophomore	Charlotte, NC	Transferred to Notre Dame

=== Incoming transfers ===
Name	Number	Pos.	Height	Weight	Year	Hometown	Previous School
Christian Carlyle	1	G	6'6"	210	RS Senior	Jacksonville, FL	Transferred from Florida Gulf Coast. Will be eligible to play immediately since Carlyle graduated from Florida Gulf Coast.
Joe Foley	3	G	6'3"	180	Freshman	Atherton, CA	Transferred from Lehigh. Will be eligible to play immediately; join the team as a walk-on.
Vittorio Reynoso-Avila	25	F	6'5"	200	Senior	La Mirada, CA	Transferred from Princeton. Will be eligible to play immediately since Reynoso-Avila graduated from Princeton.

== Recruiting ==
College recruiting information
Name	Hometown	School	Height	Weight	Commit date
Trent Hudgens; PG	Glendale, AZ	Ironwood High School	6 ft 1 in (1.85 m)	170 lb (77 kg)	Mar 26, 2020
Trent Hudgens; PG	Recruit ratings: Scout: Rivals: 247Sports: (0)				
Overall recruit ranking: Scout: nr Rivals: nr ESPN: nr
Note: In many cases, Scout, Rivals, 247Sports, On3, and ESPN may conflict in their listings of height and weight.; In these cases, the average was taken. ESPN grades are on a 100-point scale.; Sources: "Santa Clara 2020 Basketball Commitments". Rivals.; "2020 Santa Clara Basketball Commits". Scout.; "ESPN". ESPN.; "Scout.com Team Recruiting Rankings". Scout.; "2020 Team Ranking". Rivals.

=== Recruiting class of 2021 ===
College recruiting information (2021)
Name	Hometown	School	Height	Weight	Commit date
Camaron Tongue #48 PF	Weston, MA	The Rivers School	6 ft 7 in (2.01 m)	220 lb (100 kg)	Sep 3, 2019
Camaron Tongue #48 PF	Recruit ratings: Scout: Rivals: 247Sports: (76)				
Carlos Stewart #51 SG	Baton Rouge, LA	The Dunham School	6 ft 1 in (1.85 m)	185 lb (84 kg)	May 21, 2019
Carlos Stewart #51 SG	Recruit ratings: Scout: Rivals: 247Sports: (76)				
Brenton Knapper; PG	Ontario, ON	Colony High School	6 ft 0 in (1.83 m)	160 lb (73 kg)	Nov 23, 2019
Brenton Knapper; PG	Recruit ratings: Scout: Rivals: 247Sports: (0)				
Max Besselink; PF	Finland	International School of Helsinki	6 ft 7 in (2.01 m)	190 lb (86 kg)	Jun 1, 2020
Max Besselink; PF	Recruit ratings: Scout: Rivals: 247Sports: (0)				
Jacob Holt; PF	Delta, BC	Vancouver College	6 ft 8 in (2.03 m)	193 lb (88 kg)	Jun 24, 2020
Jacob Holt; PF	Recruit ratings: Scout: Rivals: 247Sports: (0)				
Overall recruit ranking: Scout: nr Rivals: nr ESPN: nr
Note: In many cases, Scout, Rivals, 247Sports, On3, and ESPN may conflict in their listings of height and weight.; In these cases, the average was taken. ESPN grades are on a 100-point scale.; Sources: "Santa Clara 2021 Basketball Commitments". Rivals.; "2021 Santa Clara Basketball Commits". Scout.; "ESPN". ESPN.; "Scout.com Team Recruiting Rankings". Scout.; "2021 Team Ranking". Rivals.

== Roster ==
2020–21 Santa Clara Broncos men's basketball team
Players
Coaches

Pos.	#	Name	Height	Weight	Year	Previous school	Hometown
F	0	D. J. Mitchell	6 ft 8 in (2.03 m)	215 lb (98 kg)	RS Sr	Buchanan HS; Wake Forest	Fresno, CA
G	1	Christian Carlyle	6 ft 5 in (1.96 m)	210 lb (95 kg)	Sr	Bishop Kenny HS; Florida Gulf Coast	Jacksonville, FL
G	2	Trent Hudgens, Jr.	6 ft 2 in (1.88 m)	175 lb (79 kg)	Fr	Ironwood HS	Phoenix, AZ
G	3	Joe Foley (W)	6 ft 3 in (1.91 m)	200 lb (91 kg)	So	Menlo School; Lehigh	Atherton, CA
G	4	Giordan Williams	6 ft 3 in (1.91 m)	165 lb (75 kg)	So	Long Beach Poly HS	Long Beach, CA
G	10	Miguel Tomley	6 ft 3 in (1.91 m)	185 lb (84 kg)	RS Fr	Tamanawis HS	Surrey, BC
C	12	Jaden Bediako	6 ft 10 in (2.08 m)	240 lb (109 kg)	So	Ridley College	Brampton, ON
F	13	Josip Vrankic	6 ft 9 in (2.06 m)	215 lb (98 kg)	Sr	Wasatch Academy	Toronto, ON
F	14	Keshawn Justice	6 ft 7 in (2.01 m)	220 lb (100 kg)	Jr	Madison East HS	Madison, WI
F	15	Juan Ducasse	6 ft 9 in (2.06 m)	210 lb (95 kg)	RS So	Lee Academy	Montevideo, Uruguay
G	20	Eli Barry (W)	6 ft 1 in (1.85 m)	165 lb (75 kg)	So	The Westminster Schools	Atlanta, GA
G	21	Justin Traina (W)	6 ft 3 in (1.91 m)	170 lb (77 kg)	RS So	Central Catholic HS	Patterson, CA
G	22	Max Dorward (W)	6 ft 5 in (1.96 m)	170 lb (77 kg)	Jr	Palo Alto HS	Palo Alto, CA
C	23	Ezekiel Richards	6 ft 10 in (2.08 m)	240 lb (109 kg)	RS So	Oak Park HS	Oak Park, CA
G	24	Jalen Williams	6 ft 6 in (1.98 m)	190 lb (86 kg)	So	Perry HS	Gilbert, AZ
F	25	Vittorio Reynoso-Avila	6 ft 5 in (1.96 m)	200 lb (91 kg)	Sr	La Mirada HS; Princeton	La Mirada, CA
F	30	Guglielmo Caruso	6 ft 11 in (2.11 m)	210 lb (95 kg)	Jr	Cuore Napoli Basket Team	Naples, Italy
F	33	Austin Sacks (W)	6 ft 6 in (1.98 m)	195 lb (88 kg)	Fr	Oakwood Secondary School	Encino, CA
G	35	Connor Strambi (W)	6 ft 4 in (1.93 m)	175 lb (79 kg)	Fr	New Hampton School	San Mateo, CA

Head coach

- Herb Sendek (Carnegie Mellon)

Assistant coach(es)

- Jason Ludwig (UCLA)
- Scott Garson (UC Santa Barbara)
- Ryan Madry (West Georgia)

Legend

- (C) Team captain
- (S) Suspended
- (I) Ineligible
- (W) Walk-on
- Injured
- Current redshirt

Roster
Last update: November 28, 2020

== Schedule and results ==
Date time, TV	Rank^{#}	Opponent^{#}	Result	Record	High points	High rebounds	High assists	Site (attendance) city, state
Non-conference regular season
November 25, 2020*; 4:00 pm, WCC Network		Idaho State; Bronco Invitational	W 62–49	1–0	24 – Vrankic	9 – Bediako	4 – Vrankic	Leavey Center; Santa Clara, CA
November 27, 2020*; 1:00 pm, WCC Network		UC Davis; Bronco Invitational	W 66–63	2–0	14 – J. Williams	14 – Bediako	3 – 3 tied	Leavey Center; Santa Clara, CA
November 28, 2020*; 4:00 pm, WCC Network		Nicholls; Bronco Invitational	W 73–57	3–0	28 – Vrankic	15 – Vrankic	3 – 3 tied	Leavey Center; Santa Clara, CA
December 2, 2020*; 6:00 pm, WCC Network		vs. Cal State Bakersfield	W 53–47	4–0	11 – Vrankic	7 – Justice	4 – Carlyle	Kaiser Permanente Arena; Santa Cruz, CA
December 5, 2020*; 2:00 pm, WCC Network		vs. New Mexico State	Canceled due to COVID-19 issues					Kaiser Permanente Arena; Santa Cruz, CA
December 9, 2020*; 6:00 pm, BigWest.tv		at Cal Poly	W 76–69	5–0	17 – Vrankic	14 – Vrankic	3 – Justice	Mott Athletics Center; San Luis Obispo, CA
December 12, 2020*; 2:00 pm, WCC Network		vs. Sacramento State	Canceled due to COVID-19 issues					Kaiser Permanente Arena; Santa Cruz, CA
December 15, 2020*; 6:00 pm, WCC Network		vs. Fresno Pacific	W 88–65	6–0	17 – Vrankic	11 – Justice	7 – Mitchell	Kaiser Permanente Arena; Santa Cruz, CA
December 18, 2020*; 6:00 pm, MW Network		vs. San Jose State	Canceled due to COVID-19 issues					Kaiser Permanente Arena; Santa Cruz, CA
December 22, 2020*; 1:00 pm, WCC Network		vs. Colorado State	L 57–70	6–1	17 – Carlyle	8 – Vrankic	4 – Bediako	Kaiser Permanente Arena; Santa Cruz, CA
December 23, 2020*; 6:00 pm, WCC Network		vs. Bethesda	Canceled due to COVID-19 issues					Kaiser Permanente Arena; Santa Cruz, CA
December 29, 2020*; 4:00 pm, P12N		at USC	L 63–86	6–2	13 – Tied	6 – Vrankic	3 – Tomley	Galen Center; Los Angeles, CA
December 31, 2020*; 2:00 pm, WCC Network		vs. New Mexico State	Canceled due to COVID-19 issues					Toyota Arena; Ontario, CA
WCC regular season
January 2, 2020; 2:00 pm, WCC Network		vs. Loyola Marymount	Postponed due to COVID-19 issues					Kaiser Permanente Arena; Santa Cruz, CA
January 7, 2021; 7:00 pm		at No. 1 Gonzaga	Postponed due to COVID-19 issues					McCarthey Athletic Center; Spokane, WA
January 9, 2021; 4:00 pm, CBSSN		at Saint Mary's	W 66–64	7–2 (1–0)	23 – Justice	8 – Vrankic	3 – Justice	University Credit Union Pavilion; Moraga, CA
January 14, 2021; 2:00 pm, WCC Network		at Pacific	L 58–79	7–3 (1–1)	18 – Justice	7 – Vrankic	2 – Tomley	Alex G. Spanos Center; Stockton, CA
January 16, 2020; 2:00 pm, WCC Network		at San Diego	Postponed due to COVID-19 issues					Jenny Craig Pavilion; San Diego, CA
January 17, 2021; 2:00 pm, WCC Network		at San Diego rescheduled from January 16	W 69–63	8–3 (2–1)	15 – Tied	12 – Vrankic	5 – J. Williams	Jenny Craig Pavilion; San Diego, CA
January 21, 2021; 7:00 pm, NBCSCA		vs. San Francisco	L 50–73	8–4 (2–2)	15 – J. Williams	7 – Caruso	3 – J. Williams	Kaiser Permanente Arena; Santa Cruz, CA
January 23, 2021; 4:00 pm, NBCSCA		at Loyola Marymount	W 72–69	9–4 (3–2)	24 – Vrankic	12 – Vrankic	4 – J. Williams	Gersten Pavilion; Los Angeles, CA
January 28, 2021; 6:00 pm		vs. Pacific	Canceled due to COVID-19 issues					Kaiser Permanente Arena; Santa Cruz, CA
January 30, 2021; 2:00 pm		at Portland	Canceled due to COVID-19 issues					Chiles Center; Portland, OR
February 4, 2021; TBA		vs. Saint Mary's	Canceled due to COVID-19 issues					Kaiser Permanente Arena; Santa Cruz, CA
February 6, 2021; 7:00 pm		at No. 1 Gonzaga rescheduled from January 7	Canceled due to COVID-19 issues					McCarthey Athletic Center; Spokane, WA
February 11, 2021; 6:00 pm		No. 1 Gonzaga	Canceled due to COVID-19 issues					Leavey Center; Santa Clara, CA
February 13, 2021; TBA		Portland	Postponed due to COVID-19 issues					Leavey Center; Santa Clara, CA
February 16, 2021; 6:00 pm		Loyola Marymount rescheduled from January 2	L 73–76	9–5 (3–3)	18 – J. Williams	5 – Mitchell	6 – J. Williams	Leavey Center; Santa Clara, CA
February 18, 2021; 6:00 pm		San Diego	L 60–71	9–6 (3–4)	25 – Vrankic	15 – Vrankic	4 – J. Williams	Leavey Center; Santa Clara, CA
February 20, 2021; 3:00 pm, Stadium		Pepperdine	W 86–82	10–6 (4–4)	26 – Vrankic	9 – Vrankic	6 – Tomley	Leavey Center; Santa Clara, CA
February 25, 2021		at BYU	Canceled due to scheduling changes					Marriott Center; Provo, UT
February 25, 2021; 4:00 pm, CBSSN		at No. 1 Gonzaga rescheduled from February 6	L 75–89	10–7 (4–5)	19 – Caruso	11 – Vrankic	4 – Vrankic	McCarthey Athletic Center (200); Spokane, WA
February 27, 2021		San Francisco	Canceled due to scheduling changes					War Memorial Gymnasium; San Francisco, CA
February 27, 2021; 7:00 pm		Portland rescheduled from February 13	Canceled due to COVID-19 issues					Leavey Center; Santa Clara, CA
WCC tournament
March 4, 2021; 9:00 pm, Stadium	(7)	vs. (10) Portland; First round	W 95–86	11–7	22 – Justice	7 – Caruso	4 – J. Williams	Orleans Arena (0); Paradise, NV
March 5, 2021; 9:00 pm, Stadium	(7)	vs. (6) Pacific; Second round	W 81–76	12–7	24 – Vrankic	6 – Caruso	4 – J. Williams	Orleans Arena (0); Paradise, NV
March 6, 2021; 9:00 pm, ESPN2	(7)	vs. (3) Pepperdine; Quarterfinals	L 70–78	12–8	16 – Caruso	10 – Vrankic	2 – Tied	Orleans Arena (0); Paradise, NV
*Non-conference game. ^{#}Rankings from AP Poll. (#) Tournament seedings in parentheses. All times are in Pacific Time.
