= Corey Kispert =

American basketball player (born 1999)

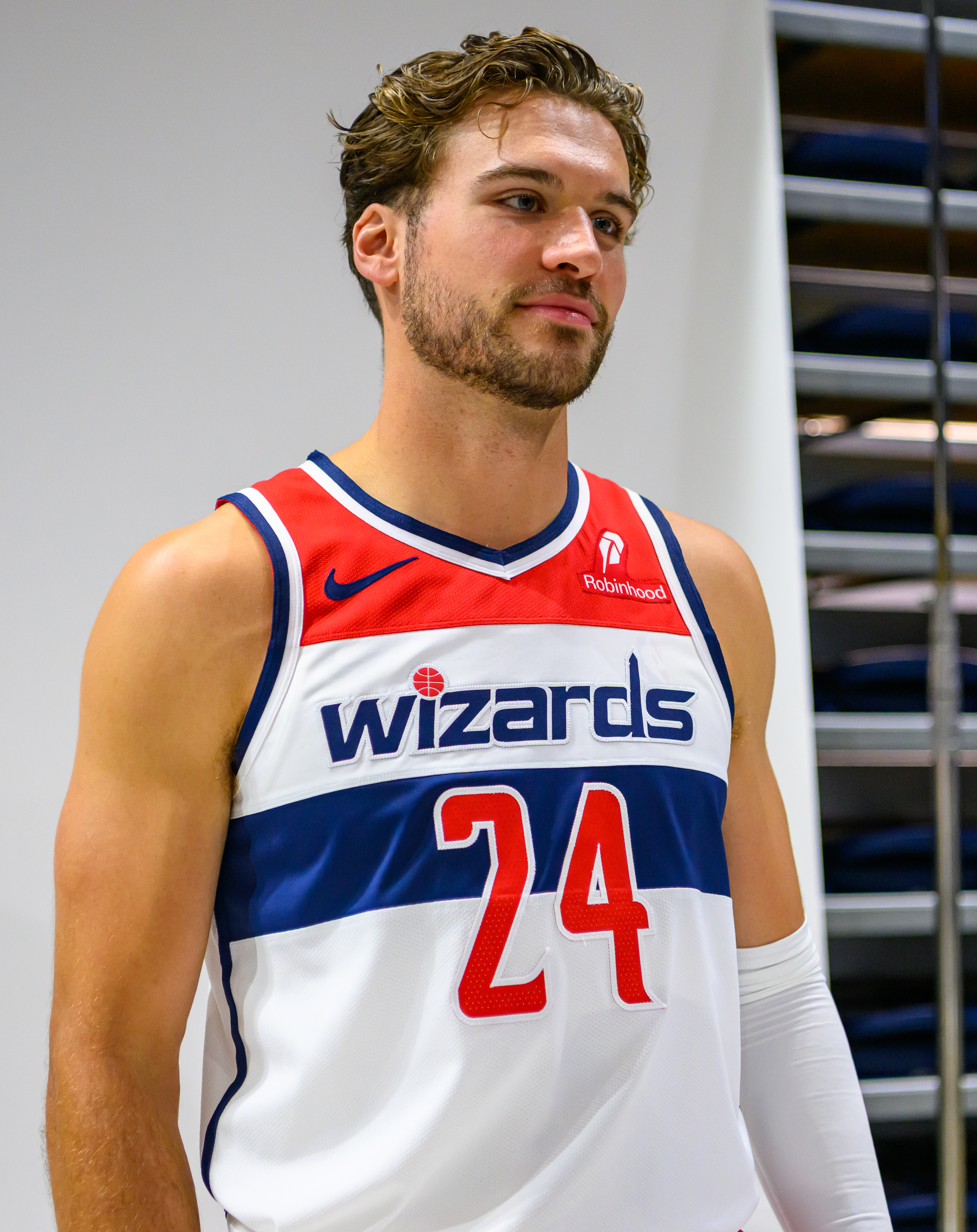
- Kispert with the Washington Wizards in 2025

No. 24 – Atlanta Hawks
- Position: Small forward
- League: NBA

Personal information
- Born: March 3, 1999 (age 27) Edmonds, Washington, U.S.
- Listed height: 6 ft 6 in (1.98 m)
- Listed weight: 224 lb (102 kg)

Career information
- High school: King's (Shoreline, Washington)
- College: Gonzaga (2017–2021)
- NBA draft: 2021: 1st round, 15th overall pick
- Drafted by: Washington Wizards
- Playing career: 2021–present

Career history
- 2021–2026: Washington Wizards
- 2026–present: Atlanta Hawks

Career highlights
- Consensus first-team All-American (2021); Julius Erving Award (2021); WCC Player of the Year (2021); 2× First-team All-WCC (2020, 2021); Academic All-American of the Year (2021)
- Stats at NBA.com
- Stats at Basketball Reference

Corey James Kispert (born March 3, 1999) is an American professional basketball player for the Atlanta Hawks of the National Basketball Association (NBA). He played college basketball for the Gonzaga Bulldogs, where he was a consensus first-team All-American as a senior.

== Early life and high school career ==
Kispert grew up in Edmonds, Washington and attended King's High School. As a junior, he averaged 23.9 points, 6.8 rebounds, 3.4 assists and 2.3 steals per game, led the team to their second straight state title, and was named the MVP of the State Championship Tournament. Rated a four-star recruit, Kispert committed to playing college basketball for Gonzaga over Notre Dame after his junior season. Kispert was averaging 25 points per game during his senior year before breaking his foot in February.

Kispert said in 2021 that Virginia head coach Tony Bennett told Kispert he "needed to see Corey play more against top competition before deciding if he could play at Virginia" and that motivated him to "stick it to" Virginia in an early season game; Virginia had recruited Kispert but did not offer him a scholarship before he committed to Gonzaga.

== College career ==
As a true freshman, Kispert played in all 35 of Gonzaga's games with seven starts, averaging 6.7 points and 3.2 rebounds per game. He became a starter for the Bulldogs going into his sophomore season, averaging eight points and 4.1 rebounds per game.

Kispert entered his junior season on the Julius Erving Award watchlist and as Gonzaga's only returning starter from the previous year. After scoring less than five points in his previous three games, Kispert scored 28 points and made seven of eight three point attempts on November 28, 2019, against Southern Mississippi in the opening round of the 2019 Battle 4 Atlantis. He scored 26 points with five three pointers made against North Carolina in a 94–81 victory. At the conclusion of the regular season, Kispert was named to the First Team All-West Coast Conference. Kispert averaged 13.9 points per game as a junior. Following the season, he declared for the 2020 NBA draft but did not hire an agent. Kispert ultimately decided to return for his senior season on August 3.

Coming into his senior season, Kispert was named to the Preseason All-West Coast Conference team. He scored his 1,000th career point in the season opener against Kansas as part of a 23-point performance in the 102–90 victory. On December 26, 2020, Kispert scored a career-high 32 points, tying the school record with nine three-pointers, in a 98–75 win against Virginia. He led Gonzaga to a 31–1 record, its only loss coming against Baylor in the national championship game. Kispert was named WCC Player of the Year and won the Julius Erving Award as the top small forward in the nation. As a senior, he averaged 18.6 points and five rebounds per game.

== Professional career ==
=== Washington Wizards ===
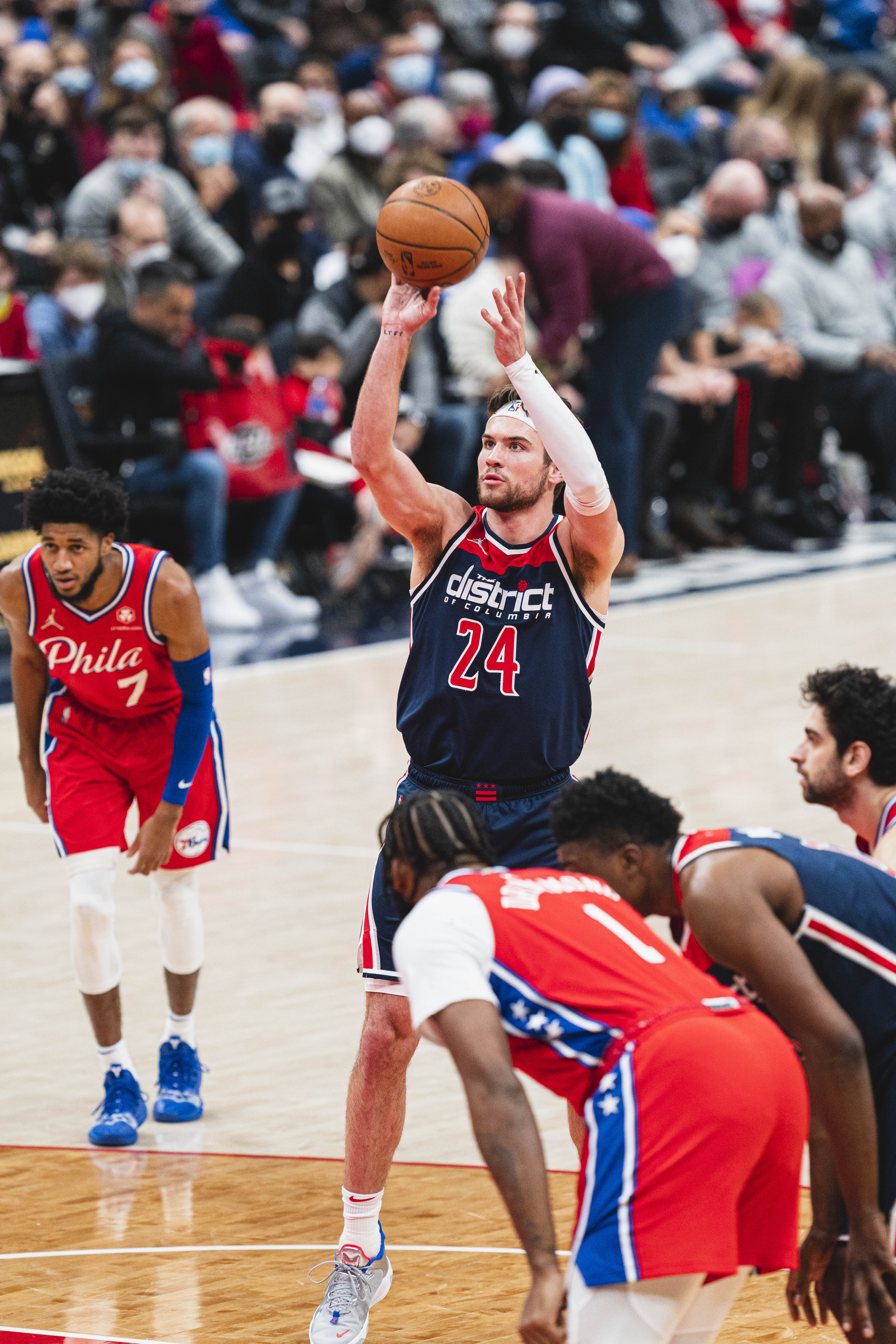
Kispert shoots a free throw with the Washington Wizards in 2025

On July 29, 2021, Kispert was drafted with the 15th overall pick in the 2021 NBA draft by the Washington Wizards. On August 4, he signed his rookie scale contract with the Wizards. Kispert made his NBA debut on October 22, scoring two points in a 135–134 overtime win over the Indiana Pacers. In his rookie year with the Wizards he averaged 8.2 points per game, in his second year he averaged 11.1 points per game, and in his third year he averaged 13.4 points per game.

Kispert is known as an excellent three-point shooter and currently (January 2025) has a 38.2% career three-point percentage. In his second year with the Wizards, his three-point percentage was 42.4%, which was 10th best in the league. In a game against the Orlando Magic on March 31, 2023, he made 9 of 14 three-pointers (64.3%) on the way to scoring 27 points. The 9 three-pointers tie him for 2nd-most three-pointers in a game in franchise history.

On October 21, 2024, Kispert and the Wizards agreed to a four–year, $54 million contract extension. In 61 appearances for Washington, he averaged 11.6 points, 3.0 rebounds, and 1.7 assists. On March 18, 2025, it was announced that Kispert would miss the remainder of the season after undergoing surgery to repair a torn ligament in his left thumb.

Kispert made 19 appearances (two starts) for Washington during the 2025–26 NBA season, averaging 9.2 points, 2.3 rebounds, and 1.7 assists. On November 27, 2025, Kispert was ruled out after being diagnosed with a fracture in the tip of his right thumb.

=== Atlanta Hawks ===
On January 9, 2026, Kispert, alongside CJ McCollum, was traded to the Atlanta Hawks in exchange for Trae Young. On February 26, Kispert recorded a career-high 33 points and six rebounds in a 126–96 victory over the Washington Wizards.

== Career statistics ==
Legend
GP	Games played	GS	Games started	MPG	Minutes per game
FG%	Field goal percentage	3P%	3-point field goal percentage	FT%	Free throw percentage
RPG	Rebounds per game	APG	Assists per game	SPG	Steals per game
BPG	Blocks per game	PPG	Points per game	**Bold**	Career high

=== NBA ===
==== Regular season ====
Year	Team	GP	GS	MPG	FG%	3P%	FT%	RPG	APG	SPG	BPG	PPG
2021–22	Washington	77	36	23.4	.455	.350	**.871**	2.7	1.1	**.5**	.3	8.2
2022–23	Washington	74	**45**	**28.3**	**.497**	**.424**	.852	2.8	1.2	.4	.1	11.1
2023–24	Washington	**80**	22	25.8	.486	.383	.726	2.8	**2.0**	**.5**	.2	**13.4**
2024–25	Washington	61	0	26.3	.451	.364	.852	**3.0**	1.7	.4	.2	11.6
2025–26	Washington	19	2	19.5	.496	.395	.765	2.3	1.7	.4	.2	9.2
2025–26	Atlanta	39	8	18.2	.455	.354	.810	2.3	1.5	.2	.2	9.2
Career		350	113	24.7	.473	.380	.803	2.7	1.5	.4	.2	10.7

==== Playoffs ====
Year	Team	GP	GS	MPG	FG%	3P%	FT%	RPG	APG	SPG	BPG	PPG
2026	Atlanta	5	0	10.8	.182	.083	.667	1.6	1.2	.4	.0	2.2
Career		5	0	10.8	.182	.083	.667	1.6	1.2	.4	.0	2.2

=== College ===
Year	Team	GP	GS	MPG	FG%	3P%	FT%	RPG	APG	SPG	BPG	PPG
2017–18	Gonzaga	35	7	19.4	.460	.351	.667	3.2	.7	.3	.2	6.7
2018–19	Gonzaga	**37**	**36**	26.1	.437	.374	.875	4.1	1.0	.6	**.5**	8.0
2019–20	Gonzaga	33	33	**33.0**	.474	.438	.810	4.0	**2.1**	**.9**	.4	13.9
2020–21	Gonzaga	32	32	31.8	**.529**	**.440**	**.878**	**5.0**	1.8	**.9**	.4	**18.6**
Career		137	108	27.4	.483	.408	.824	4.0	1.4	.7	.4	11.6

== Personal life ==
Kispert is a Catholic. While at Gonzaga, Kispert met his girlfriend Jenn Wirth, where they both played basketball. The couple got married on July 7, 2023, at the Mission Basilica San Juan Capistrano in San Juan Capistrano, California. He is the grandson of Dainard Paulson, a former American Football League player who holds that league's record for most interceptions in a season.
