= 2021 West Coast Conference men's basketball tournament =

- Classification: Division I
- Season: 2020–21
- Teams: 10
- Site: Orleans Arena; Paradise, Nevada
- Champions: Gonzaga (19th title)
- Winning coach: Mark Few (17th title)
- MVP: Jalen Suggs (Gonzaga)
- Television: ESPN, ESPN2, ESPNU, Stadium

2020–21 West Coast Conference men's basketball standings
	Conf.				Overall
Team	W		L	PCT	W		L	PCT
No. 1 Gonzaga †	15	–	0	1.000	31	–	1	.969
No. 23 BYU	10	–	3	.769	20	–	7	.741
Loyola Marymount	7	–	5	.583	13	–	9	.591
Pepperdine	7	–	6	.538	15	–	12	.556
Pacific	6	–	7	.462	9	–	9	.500
Santa Clara	4	–	5	.444	12	–	8	.600
Saint Mary's	4	–	6	.400	14	–	10	.583
San Francisco	4	–	9	.308	11	–	14	.440
San Diego	2	–	7	.222	3	–	11	.214
Portland	0	–	11	.000	6	–	15	.286
† 2021 WCC tournament winner Rankings from AP poll

The 2021 West Coast Conference men's basketball tournament was the postseason men's basketball tournament for the West Coast Conference during the 2020–21 NCAA Division I men's basketball season. The tournament was held from March 4 through March 9, 2021 at the Orleans Arena in Paradise, Nevada. Gonzaga won the tournament, giving it the conference's automatic bid to the 2021 NCAA tournament, in the process becoming the 16th team to enter the Division I tournament unbeaten. For the third consecutive year, the Los Angeles-based University Credit Union was the title sponsor of the tournament.

== Venue ==
For the thirteenth consecutive year, the 2021 WCC Tournament was held in the Orleans Arena. When the Orleans Arena is set up for basketball games, the seating capacity is 7,471. The tournament is scheduled to be held at the Orleans Arena at least until 2022. The Orleans Arena is located at the 1,886 room Orleans Hotel and Casino about 1 mile west of the Las Vegas Strip. The tickets for the WCC Tournament typically sell out quickly. Due to the COVID-19 pandemic, no fans were permitted to attend this tournament.

== Seeds ==
All 10 WCC schools were eligible to participate in the tournament. Teams are typically seeded by conference record, with a tiebreaker system used to seed teams with identical conference records. However, due to numerous regular-season game cancellations, the WCC announced on February 16 that the seeding for the 2021 edition would be determined using an adjusted conference winning percentage. Developed in partnership with Ken Pomeroy, the adjusted conference winning percentage takes into account the strength of the opponent and the location where each game was played. The final report was released on February 28.

Ken Pomeroy Adjusted Conference Winning Percentage
	February 16	February 19	February 21	February 23	February 26	February 28
1	Gonzaga (0.978)	Gonzaga (0.979)	Gonzaga (0.960)	Gonzaga (0.960)	Gonzaga (0.960)	Gonzaga (0.962)
2	BYU (0.789)	BYU (0.811)	BYU (0.801)	BYU (0.798)	BYU (0.796)	BYU (0.810)
3	Pepperdine (0.786)	Pepperdine (0.800)	Pepperdine (0.697)	Pepperdine (0.638)	Saint Mary's (0.590)	Pepperdine (0.590)
4	Saint Mary's (0.517)	Saint Mary's (0.490)	LMU (0.493)	Saint Mary's (0.562)	Pepperdine (0.575)	Saint Mary's (0.580)
5	Santa Clara (0.498)	LMU (0.485)	Saint Mary's (0.486)	Pacific (0.508)	LMU (0.559)	LMU (0.557)
6	Pacific (0.481)	Pacific (0.482)	Pacific (0.485)	LMU (0.502)	Pacific (0.479)	Pacific (0.504)
7	LMU (0.423)	Santa Clara (0.370)	Santa Clara (0.451)	Santa Clara (0.446)	Santa Clara (0.457)	Santa Clara (0.453)
8	San Francisco (0.384)	San Francisco (0.289)	San Francisco (0.332)	San Francisco (0.330)	San Francisco (0.328)	San Francisco (0.306)
9	San Diego (0.137)	San Diego (0.288)	San Diego (0.281)	San Diego (0.242)	San Diego (0.244)	San Diego (0.228)
10	Portland (0.008)	Portland (0.006)	Portland (0.008)	Portland (0.008)	Portland (0.008)	Portland (0.008)

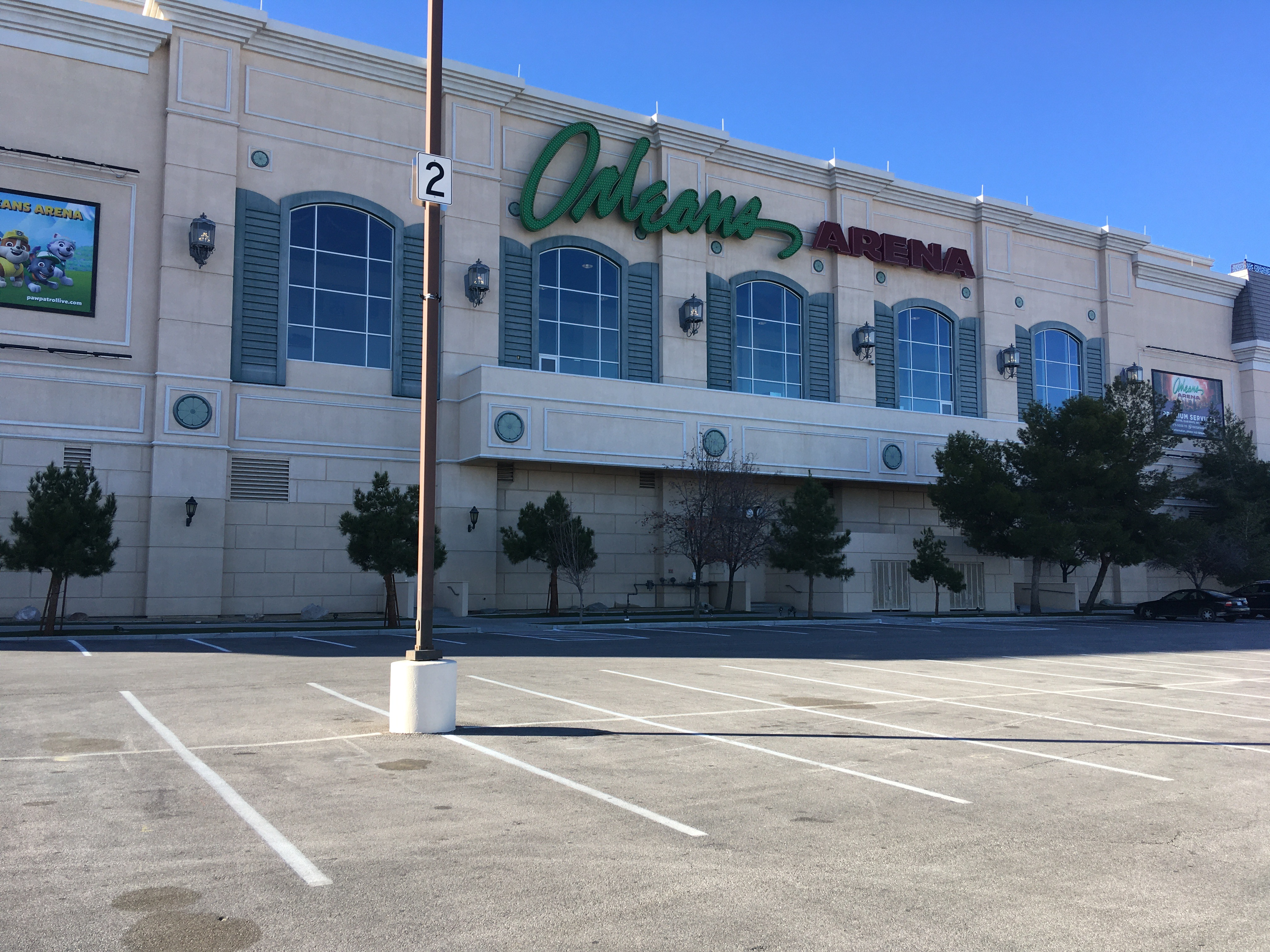
Orleans Arena, location of the 2021 WCC Tournament, near Las Vegas, Nevada

The tournament followed a format similar to that used from 2003 to 2011. The 7 through 10 seeds played in the "first round", the 5 and 6 seeds started play in the "second round", and the 3 and 4 seeds started in the "quarterfinals". The top two seeds received byes into the semifinals.

== Schedule ==
Session	Game	Time*	Matchup^{#}	Score	Television	Attendance
First round – Thursday, March 4, 2021
1	1	6:00 pm	No. 8 San Francisco vs. No. 9 San Diego	67–51	Stadium	0
1	2	9:00 pm	No. 7 Santa Clara vs. No. 10 Portland	95–86	Stadium	0
Second round – Friday, March 5, 2021
2	3	6:00 pm	No. 5 Loyola Marymount vs. No. 8 San Francisco	70–66	Stadium	0
2	4	9:00 pm	No. 6 Pacific vs. No. 7 Santa Clara	76–81	Stadium	0
Third round – Saturday, March 6, 2021
3	5	6:00 pm	No. 4 Saint Mary's vs. No. 5 Loyola Marymount	52–47	ESPNU	0
3	6	9:00 pm	No. 3 Pepperdine vs. No. 7 Santa Clara	78–70	ESPN2	0
Semifinals – Monday, March 8, 2021
4	7	6:00 pm	No. 1 Gonzaga vs. No. 4 Saint Mary's	78–55	ESPN	0
4	8	9:00 pm	No. 2 BYU vs. No. 3 Pepperdine	82–77^{OT}	ESPN2	0
Championship – Tuesday, March 9, 2021
5	9	6:00 pm	No. 1 Gonzaga vs. No. 2 BYU	88–78	ESPN	0
*Game times in PT. #-Rankings denote tournament seeding.

== Bracket ==
First round Thursday, March 4 Stadium
8	San Francisco	67
9	San Diego	51
7	Santa Clara	95
10	Portland	86

Second round Friday, March 5 Stadium
5	Loyola Marymount	70
8	San Francisco	66
6	Pacific	76
7	Santa Clara	81

Third round Saturday, March 6 ESPNU & ESPN2
4	Saint Mary's	52
5	Loyola Marymount	47
3	Pepperdine	78
7	Santa Clara	70

Semifinals; Monday, March 8 ESPN & ESPN2
1	Gonzaga	78
4	Saint Mary's	55
2	BYU	82*
3	Pepperdine	77

Championship; Tuesday, March 9 ESPN
1	Gonzaga	88
2	BYU	78

* denotes overtime period

== See also ==
- 2021 West Coast Conference women's basketball tournament
- West Coast Conference men's basketball tournament
