= Stan Johnson (basketball coach) =

American basketball coach (born 1979)

Current position
- Title: Head coach
- Team: Loyola Marymount
- Conference: WCC
- Record: 90–93 (.492)

Biographical details
- Born: September 16, 1979 (age 47); Liberia

Playing career
- 1998–2002: Southern Utah
- 2002–2003: Bemidji State

Coaching career (HC unless noted)
- 2003–2004: Bemidji State (assistant)
- 2004–2007: Southwest Baptist (assistant)
- 2007–2008: Cal State Northridge (assistant)
- 2008–2011: Utah (assistant)
- 2011–2013: Drake (assistant)
- 2013–2015: Arizona State (assistant)
- 2015–2020: Marquette (assistant)
- 2020–present: Loyola Marymount

Head coaching record
- Overall: 90–93 (.492)

Stan Johnson (born September 16, 1979) is a Liberian-born basketball coach and former player who is the current head coach of the Loyola Marymount Lions men's basketball team.

== Playing career ==
Johnson played three seasons at Southern Utah where he was a team captain and part of the Thunderbirds' 2001 NCAA tournament squad which was narrowly defeated 68–65 by third-seeded Boston College in the program's only NCAA Tournament appearance. For his senior season, Johnson transferred to Bemidji State and was the team's leader in assists and an all-conference honorable mention.

== Coaching career ==
Johnson stayed on Bemidji State's bench following his senior year as a one-year stop as an assistant coach before moving on to Southwest Baptist as an assistant from 2004 to 2007, where he was part of a Bearcats MAIAA team which made the NCAA Division II Tournament. After a one-year stop at Cal State Northridge where he tied for first in the Big West Conference, Johnson joined Jim Boylen's staff at Utah. In 2008–09, the Utes won a share of the Mountain West Conference Championship and the postseason conference tournament title. Utah finished the season ranked No. 25 in the AP poll and earned a No. 5 seed in the Midwest Region, at the time the highest seed ever given to a Mountain West team. He landed at Drake for an assistant coaching spell from 2011 to 2013 before joining Herb Sendek's staff at Arizona State, where he remained until 2015, helping guide the Sun Devils to an NCAA Tournament appearance in 2014. In 2015, Johnson joined Steve Wojciechowski's staff at Marquette, and was a part of two Golden Eagles NCAA tournament teams. Johnson was responsible for recruiting Markus Howard to Arizona State and, ultimately, Marquette where Howard became a consensus First Team All-American selection as a senior.

On March 20, 2020, Johnson was named the head coach at Loyola Marymount, replacing Mike Dunlap. In the 2022-23 season, Johnson became the only coach in West Coast Conference history to defeat BYU, Gonzaga, and Saint Mary's in the same season. After defeating BYU on 64-59 in the conference home opener on January 5, 2023, Johnson's Lions snapped Gonzaga's 75-game home win streak on Jan. 19, 2023 with a 68-67 win over the #6 team in the country. LMU then defeated #15 Saint Mary's at Gersten Pavilion on February 9, 2023, for his second nationally-ranked win of the season. Johnson has led LMU to two MTE (Multi-Team Event) Tournament titles in his tenure, winning the Jamaica Classic in 2022 and the Cancun Challenge in 2024.

== Head coaching record ==
Record table
Season	Team	Overall	Conference	Standing	Postseason
Loyola Marymount Lions (West Coast Conference) (2020–present)
2020–21	Loyola Marymount	13–9	7–5	3rd	
2021–22	Loyola Marymount	11–18	3–12	9th	
2022–23	Loyola Marymount	19–12	9–7	4th	
2023–24	Loyola Marymount	12–19	5–11	T–6th	
2024–25	Loyola Marymount	17–15	8–10	T–6th	
2025–26	Loyola Marymount	15–17	6–12	T–9th	
2026–27	Loyola Marymount	3–3	0–0		
Loyola Marymount:		90–93 (.492)	38–57 (.400)		
Total:		90–93 (.492)			
