= Crossover Classic =

College basketball tournament

- Sport: College basketball
- Founded: 2020 (men and women)
- Founder: Sanford Health
- No. of teams: 4
- Country: United States
- Venues: Sanford Pentagon; Sioux Falls, South Dakota
- Broadcaster: ESPN
- Related competitions: Battle 4 Atlantis
- Website: Crossover Classic

The Crossover Classic (branded as the Crossover Classic presented by Mammoth Sports Construction for sponsorship reasons) is an early-season college basketball tournament that first took place November 25–30, 2020, at the Sanford Pentagon in Sioux Falls, South Dakota.

The tournament was originally established in 2020, intending to be a de facto substitute for the Battle 4 Atlantis tournament following its cancellation due to the COVID-19 pandemic; organizers invited all of the teams that had been invited to participate that year, but due to withdrawals only two of the originally-invited teams participated. The tournament returned for 2021, this time as a four-team round robin event.

== Background ==
The Battle 4 Atlantis tournament in Nassau, Bahamas was cancelled due to logistical issues tied to the COVID-19 pandemic. In the wake of the decision, a representative of the event was contacted by one of the teams' coaches, suggesting that an event could be held at the Pentagon. Attempts were made to invite all of the teams who had originally been slated to compete at the 2020 edition of the Battle 4 Atlantis, with only Duke declining. South Dakota had among the highest rates of new COVID-19 cases per-capita nationwide, but the tournament and venue's association with the local Sanford Health system was stated by organizers as allowing them to "put together a plan to make this a safe environment for all the teams that have committed to playing here."

Creighton, Dayton, Ohio State, Texas A&M, and Utah dropped out of the tournament prior to the event. The day before the tournament was scheduled to begin, Wichita State withdrew due to a COVID-19 outbreak on the team, leaving only two of the originally-invited teams left. It was originally planning to admit a limited number of spectators per-game, but on November 23 it was announced that the tournament would be played behind closed doors with no spectators admitted.

The tournament returned for 2021, switching to a round-robin format with four invited teams.

== Tournament history ==
=== Tournament champions ===
Year	Winner	Score	Opponent(s)	Tournament MVP
2020	West Virginia	70-64	Western Kentucky	Derek Culver
2021	Nevada	South Dakota State 102-75 (L), George Mason 88-69 (W), Washington 81-62 (W)	South Dakota State, George Mason, Washington	Grant Sherfield

=== 2020 ===
5th Place Game; November 27
Saint Mary's	72
South Dakota State	59
7th Place Game
Northern Iowa	71
Utah State	82

Consolation 2nd Round; November 26
Saint Mary's	66
Northern Iowa	64
South Dakota State	83
Utah State	59

First Round; November 25
Memphis	73
Saint Mary's	56
Northern Iowa	87
Western Kentucky	93
South Dakota State	71
15	West Virginia	79
Utah State	69
VCU	85

Semifinals; November 26
Memphis	69
Western Kentucky	75
15	West Virginia	78
VCU	66

Championship; November 27
Western Kentucky	64
West Virginia	70
3rd Place Game
Memphis	59
VCU	70

=== 2021 ===
The 2021 edition of the Crossover Classic was a round-robin tournament held from November 22-24, played between South Dakota State, Washington, Nevada and George Mason.

First Round; November 22
South Dakota State	102
Nevada	75

First Round
George Mason	74
Washington	77

Second Round; November 23
Nevada	88
George Mason	69

Second Round
Washington	87
South Dakota State	76

Third Round; November 24
Washington	62
Nevada	81

Third Round
George Mason	76
South Dakota State	80
