= Jalen Suggs =

American basketball player (born 2001)

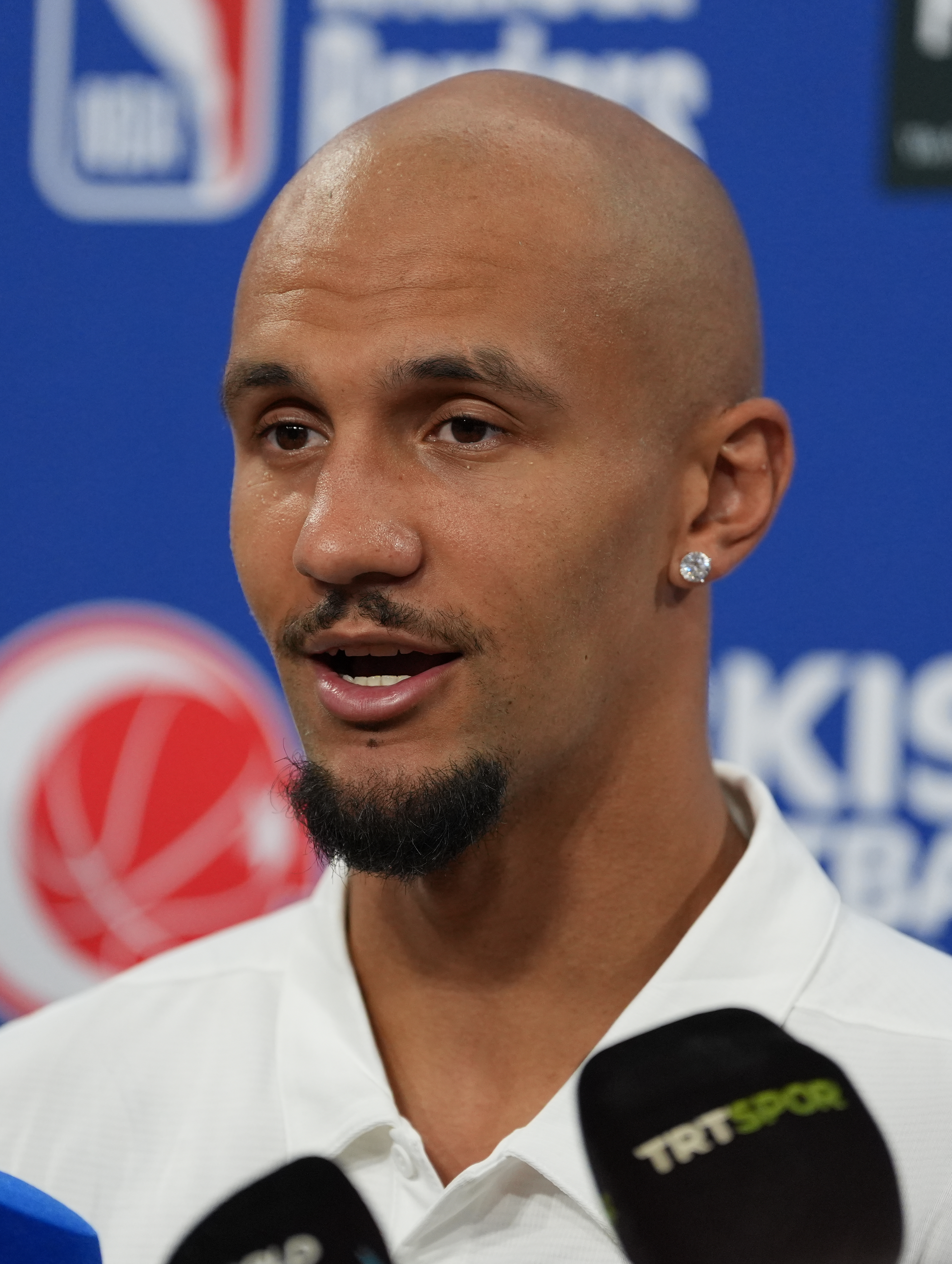
- Suggs in 2026

No. 4 – Orlando Magic
- Position: Point guard
- League: NBA

Personal information
- Born: June 3, 2001 (age 25) Saint Paul, Minnesota, U.S.
- Listed height: 6 ft 5 in (1.96 m)
- Listed weight: 207 lb (94 kg)

Career information
- High school: Minnehaha Academy (Minneapolis, Minnesota)
- College: Gonzaga (2020–2021)
- NBA draft: 2021: 1st round, 5th overall pick
- Drafted by: Orlando Magic
- Playing career: 2021–present

Career history
- 2021–present: Orlando Magic

Career highlights
- NBA All-Defensive Second Team (2024); Consensus second-team All-American (2021); First-team All-WCC (2021); WCC Newcomer of the Year (2021); WCC All-Freshman Team (2021); WCC tournament MOP (2021); McDonald's All-American (2020); Minnesota Mr. Basketball (2020)
- Stats at NBA.com
- Stats at Basketball Reference
Medals
Men's basketball
Representing United States
FIBA Under-19 World Cup
Gold medal – first place	2019 Greece	Team
FIBA Under-17 World Cup
Gold medal – first place	2018 Argentina	Team
FIBA Americas Under-16 Championship
Gold medal – first place	2017 Argentina	Team

Jalen Rashon Suggs (born June 3, 2001) is an American professional basketball player for the Orlando Magic of the National Basketball Association (NBA). He played college basketball for the Gonzaga Bulldogs. He was selected by the Magic with the fifth overall pick in the 2021 NBA draft.

== Early life ==
Suggs was born in Saint Paul, Minnesota, to Larry Suggs and Molly Manley. Suggs' father was an accomplished local athlete. Suggs started playing basketball at an early age. In seventh grade, he played three games of junior varsity basketball for Minnehaha Academy, a private Christian school in Minneapolis, before moving to the varsity team. Suggs was a starter at the varsity level as an eighth-grade student, averaging 17.5 points, 4.4 steals, and four assists per game.

== High school career ==
As a freshman at Minnehaha Academy, Suggs averaged 21.5 points, eight rebounds and five assists per game. He scored 22 points, including 15 in the second half, to win the Class 2A state championship over Crosby-Ironton High School. Suggs was named to the MaxPreps Freshman All-American first team. In his sophomore season, he averaged 16 points, 9.2 rebounds and 3.4 assists per game, leading his team to another Class 2A state title. Suggs earned Associated Press (AP) All-State first team and MaxPreps Sophomore All-American second team honors.

As a junior, he averaged 23.3 points, 4.7 rebounds and 6.3 assists per game, winning a third straight Class 2A state championship. Suggs was named to the AP All-State first team and MaxPreps Junior All-American third team. As a senior, he averaged 23.3 points, 7.5 rebounds, five assists and 3.9 steals per game. The school's 2019–20 season was cut short due to the COVID-19 pandemic one day after it won a section title, and the team was unable to defend its state championship. Suggs left as his school's all-time leading scorer, with 2,945 career points. Suggs earned MaxPreps All-American first team and Minnesota Mr. Basketball honors, and was named Minnesota AP Player of the Year. He was selected to play in the McDonald's All-American Game, Jordan Brand Classic and Nike Hoop Summit, but all three games were canceled due to the COVID-19 pandemic.

In addition to basketball, Suggs played the quarterback position for SMB Wolfpack, a cooperative football team representing Minnehaha Academy and three other private schools. He led his team to a Class 4A state championship as a junior in 2018. In his senior season, Suggs helped SMB finish as Class 4A runners-up and was named Minnesota Mr. Football. In his senior year, he was recognized as MaxPreps Athlete of the Year for his success in basketball and football. He became the first athlete in Minnesota history to win the state's Mr. Basketball and Mr. Football awards in the same academic school year.

=== Recruiting ===
On January 3, 2020, Suggs committed to play college basketball for Gonzaga University, choosing the Bulldogs over offers from Florida, Florida State, Iowa State and Minnesota. He became the highest ranked player to commit to the program. Suggs was a consensus five-star recruit, with ESPN considering him the fifth-best player in the 2020 class. In football, Suggs was considered a four-star dual-threat quarterback by ESPN.

College recruiting
Name	Hometown	School	Height	Weight	Commit date
Jalen Suggs; PG / SG	St. Paul, MN	Minnehaha Academy (MN)	6 ft 5 in (1.96 m)	200 lb (91 kg)	Jan 3, 2020
Jalen Suggs; PG / SG	Recruit ratings: Rivals: 247Sports: ESPN: (96)				
Overall recruit ranking: Rivals: 11 247Sports: 13 ESPN: 6
Note: In many cases, Scout, Rivals, 247Sports, On3, and ESPN may conflict in their listings of height and weight.; In these cases, the average was taken. ESPN grades are on a 100-point scale.; Sources: "Gonzaga 2020 Basketball Commitments". Rivals.; "2020 Gonzaga Bulldogs Recruiting Class". ESPN.; "2020 Team Ranking". Rivals.

== College career ==
Suggs played for the Gonzaga Bulldogs men's basketball team in the 2020–21 NCAA Division I men's basketball season.

In his debut on November 25, 2020, Suggs recorded 24 points and eight assists in a 102–90 win over Kansas. On December 2, during a game against West Virginia, he suffered an apparent foot injury but returned later in the game. On December 19, Suggs posted a career-high 27 points, seven rebounds and four assists, shooting 7-of-10 from three-point range, in a 99–88 win over third-ranked Iowa.

On March 9, 2021, Suggs recorded 23 points, five rebounds and five assists in an 88–78 win against BYU at the 2021 WCC tournament title game. He was named tournament most outstanding player. In the Final Four of the 2021 NCAA tournament, Suggs banked in a 40-foot (12 m), 3-point, game-winning buzzer beater to defeat No. 11 seed UCLA 93–90 in overtime, advancing Gonzaga to the championship game, where he scored 22 points in a loss to Baylor.

As a freshman, he averaged 14.4 points, 5.3 rebounds and 4.5 assists per game and was a consensus second-team All-American. He earned First Team All-West Coast Conference (WCC), Newcomer of the Year, and All-Freshman Team honors. He also received several player-of-the-week honors during the 2020–2021 season. On April 19, 2021, Suggs declared for the 2021 NBA draft, forgoing his remaining college eligibility.

== Professional career ==
=== Orlando Magic (2021–present) ===
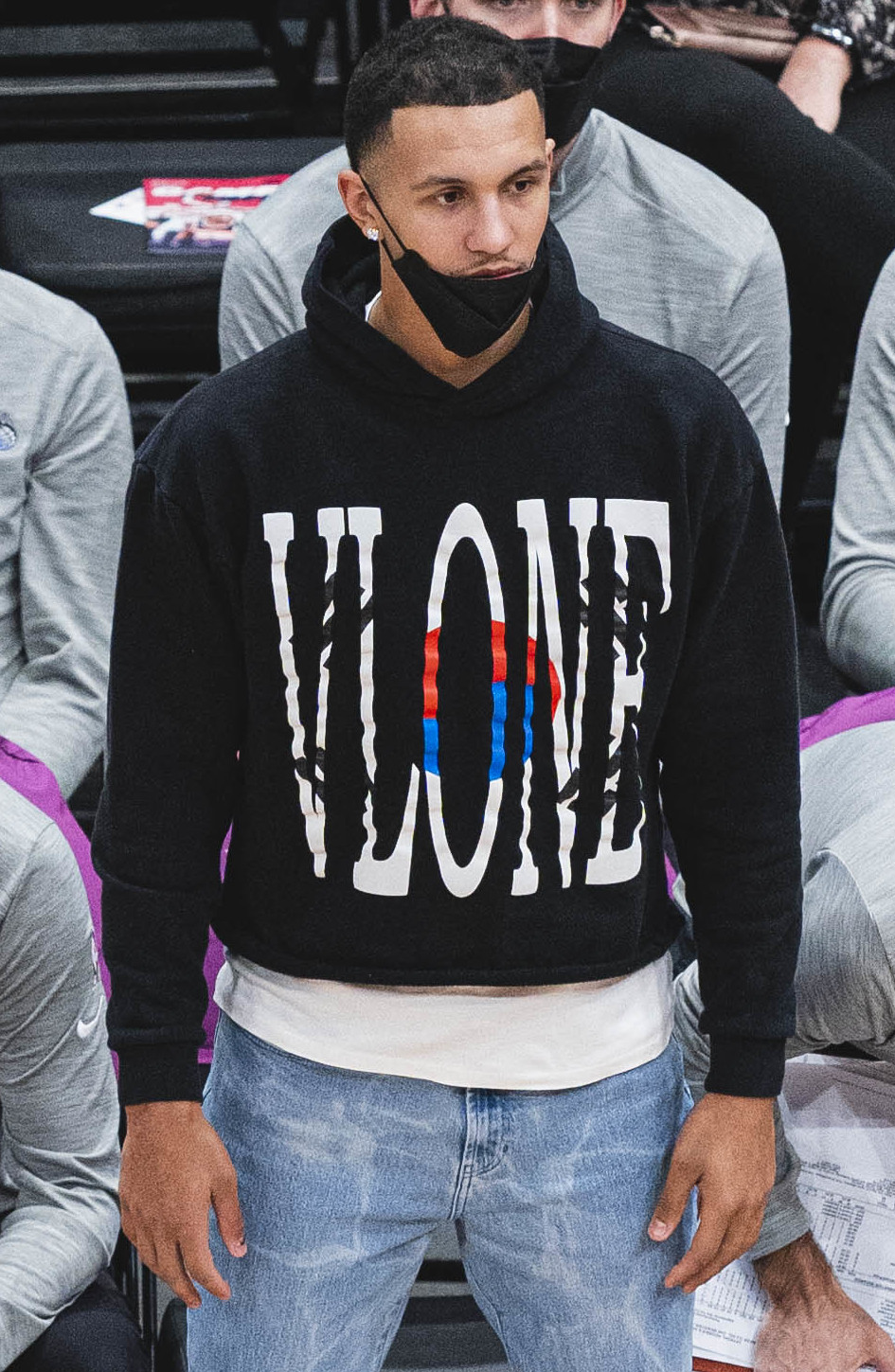
Suggs on the sidelines with the Orlando Magic in 2022

Suggs was selected with the fifth overall pick in the 2021 NBA draft by the Orlando Magic. Suggs dropping to the fifth overall selection was surprising, as on the night of the draft, many analysts assumed Suggs would be selected by the Toronto Raptors, who owned the fourth pick. It was assumed that he would fit well with the void created by the impending departure of six time all-star guard, Kyle Lowry. Instead, Toronto unexpectedly selected forward Scottie Barnes out of Florida State.

On August 9, he made his summer league debut in a 91–89 win against the Golden State Warriors in which he posted 24 points, nine rebounds, three blocks, and two steals in 28 minutes.

On October 20, Suggs made his NBA debut, putting up 10 points in a 123–97 loss to the San Antonio Spurs. On November 29, Suggs fractured his right thumb in a 101–96 loss to the Philadelphia 76ers, finishing the game with 17 points before being removed due to the injury. He missed twenty games with the injury. After the 2021–22 season ended, Suggs underwent right ankle surgery.

On November 18, 2022, against the Chicago Bulls, Suggs hit the game-winning three-pointer in a 108–107 win for the Magic. On February 4, 2023, he was suspended by the NBA for one game for his role in an altercation during a game against the Minnesota Timberwolves the day before.

On January 5, 2024, Suggs recorded a then career-high 27 points in a 122–120 win over the Denver Nuggets. On April 25, 2024, Suggs recorded a playoff career-high 24 points with an 81.8 field goal percentage, in a 121–83 home victory of Game 3 of the 2024 Eastern Conference First Round against the Cleveland Cavaliers. In Game 6 of the same series, on the verge of elimination, Suggs recorded 22 points to help the Magic force Game 7. Suggs was named to the NBA All-Defensive Second Team at the end of the season, becoming the third player in franchise history to receive the honors, and the first since Dwight Howard in the 2011–12 NBA season.

On October 21, 2024, Suggs and the Magic agreed to a five–year, $150.5 million contract extension.

On November 27, 2024, Suggs put up a career-high 31 points, along with seven assists and three rebounds in a 133–119 win over the Chicago Bulls. On January 12, 2025, Suggs was taken off the court in a wheelchair because of back spasms in the first half against the Toronto Raptors. He fell playing defense without any contact and was clutching at his lower back. On March 4, Suggs was ruled out for the remainder of the season after undergoing arthroscopic surgery to removed a cartilage fragment in his left knee. In 35 games for Orlando, he averaged 16.2 points, 4.0 rebounds, and 3.7 assists.

== National team career ==
Suggs won a gold medal with the United States at the 2017 FIBA Under-16 Americas Championship in Formosa, Argentina. In four games, he averaged 7.5 points and 2.8 rebounds per game. At the 2018 FIBA Under-17 World Cup in Argentina, Suggs averaged 8.7 points and 3.3 steals per game and won another gold medal. He joined the United States at the 2019 FIBA Under-19 World Cup in Heraklion, Greece, averaging 9.6 points per game and helping his team win the gold medal. Suggs scored 15 points, his best mark in the tournament, in the final against Mali.

== Career statistics ==
Legend
GP	Games played	GS	Games started	MPG	Minutes per game
FG%	Field goal percentage	3P%	3-point field goal percentage	FT%	Free throw percentage
RPG	Rebounds per game	APG	Assists per game	SPG	Steals per game
BPG	Blocks per game	PPG	Points per game	**Bold**	Career high

=== NBA ===
==== Regular season ====
Year	Team	GP	GS	MPG	FG%	3P%	FT%	RPG	APG	SPG	BPG	PPG
2021–22	Orlando	48	45	27.2	.361	.214	.773	3.6	4.4	1.2	.4	11.8
2022–23	Orlando	53	19	23.5	.419	.327	.723	3.0	2.9	1.3	.5	9.9
2023–24	Orlando	**75**	**75**	27.0	**.471**	**.397**	.756	3.1	2.7	1.4	.6	12.6
2024–25	Orlando	35	35	**28.6**	.410	.314	**.882**	**4.0**	3.7	1.5	**.9**	**16.2**
2025–26	Orlando	57	56	27.6	.435	.339	.855	3.9	**5.5**	**1.8**	.7	13.8
Career		268	230	26.7	.423	.331	.792	3.4	3.8	1.4	.6	12.6

==== Playoffs ====
Year	Team	GP	GS	MPG	FG%	3P%	FT%	RPG	APG	SPG	BPG	PPG
2024	Orlando	**7**	**7**	33.2	**.402**	**.292**	.767	**5.1**	3.3	1.3	.4	**14.7**
2026	Orlando	**7**	**7**	**35.4**	.299	.241	**.929**	4.0	**4.1**	**1.9**	**.6**	11.1
Career		14	14	34.3	.349	.265	.818	4.6	3.7	1.6	.5	12.9

=== College ===
Year	Team	GP	GS	MPG	FG%	3P%	FT%	RPG	APG	SPG	BPG	PPG
2020–21	Gonzaga	30	30	28.9	.503	.337	.761	5.3	4.5	1.9	.3	14.4

== Personal life ==
Suggs has two younger sisters. He is the second cousin once removed of former NFL player Terrell Suggs, a two-time Super Bowl champion. Suggs is also a cousin of Eddie Jones, a three-time NBA All-Star, and Pacers guard Tyrese Haliburton, a two-time NBA All-Star. He has several other cousins that have played NCAA Division I basketball. Suggs is a Christian.
