= Cal State Northridge Matadors men's basketball statistical leaders =

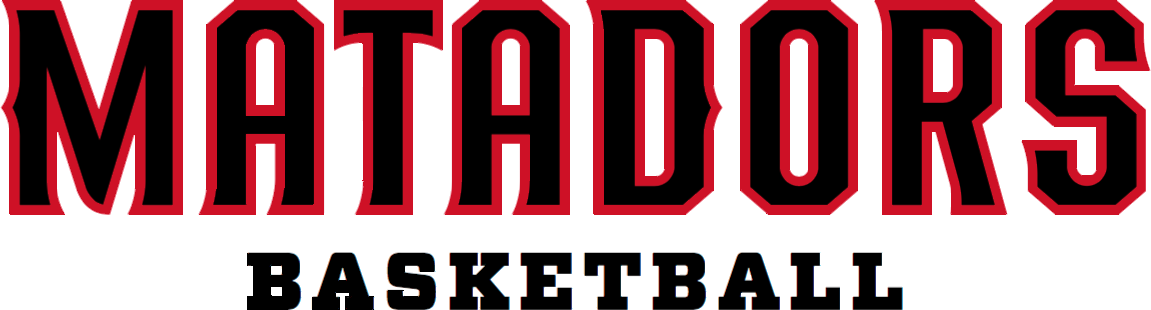

The Cal State Northridge Matadors men's basketball statistical leaders are individual statistical leaders of the Cal State Northridge Matadors men's basketball program in various categories, including points, rebounds, assists, steals, and blocks. Within those areas, the lists identify single-game, single-season, and career leaders. The Matadors represent California State University, Northridge in the NCAA's Big West Conference.

Cal State Northrdige began competing in intercollegiate basketball in 1958. The NCAA did not officially record assists as a stat until the 1983–84 season, and blocks and steals until the 1985–86 season, but Cal State Northridge's record books includes players in these stats before these seasons. These lists are updated through the end of the 2020–21 season.

== Scoring ==
Career
Rk	Player	Points	Seasons
1	Stephan Hicks	1,959	2011–12 2012–13 2013–14 2014–15
2	Stephen Maxwell	1,748	2011–12 2012–13 2013–14 2014–15
3	Brian Heinle	1,641	1997–98 1998–99 1999–00 2000–01
4	Terrell Gomez	1,637	2017–18 2018–19 2019–20
5	Ian Boylan	1,610	2001–02 2002–03 2003–04 2004–05
6	Josh Greene	1,549	2010–11 2011–12 2012–13 2013–14
7	Jonathan Heard	1,362	2004–05 2005–06 2006–07 2007–08
8	Andre Chevalier	1,311	1990–91 1991–92 1992–93 1993–94
9	Lamine Diane	1,304	2018–19 2019–20
10	Jim Malkin	1,292	1959–60 1960–61 1961–62

Season
Rk	Player	Points	Season
1	Lamine Diane	818	2018–19
2	Terrell Gomez	652	2018–19
3	Brian Heinle	646	2000–01
4	Terrell Gomez	634	2019–20
5	George Robnett	623	1973–74
6	De'Sean Allen-Eikens	620	2023–24
7	Stephen Maxwell	612	2013–14
8	Stephan Hicks	601	2013–14
9	Larry Hughes II	583	2025–26
10	Loren Bracci	577	1968–69

Single game
Rk	Player	Points	Season	Opponent
1	Ollie Carter	47	1965–66	Westpoint
2	Atin Wright	42	2022–23	UC Davis
3	Mark Cooley	40	1966–67	Cal State Fullerton
4	Mike O’Quinn	39	1997–98	Eastern Wash.
	Mike Efevberha	39	2005–06	Cal State Fullerton
	Kenny Daniels	39	2009–10	Idaho
	Lamine Diane	39	2018–19	Cal State Fullerton
8	Andre Chevalier	38	1993–94	San Diego State
	Marqui Worthy Jr.	38	2025–26	UC Riverside
10	Bill Archer	37	1965–66	Long Beach State
	Loren Bracci	37	1968–69	Long Beach State
	George Robnett	37	1972–73	Cal State LA
	Josh Greene	37	2012–13	Hawai'i

== Rebounds ==
Career
Rk	Player	Rebounds	Seasons
1	Stephen Maxwell	976	2011–12 2012–13 2013–14 2014–15
2	Jerry Joseph	807	1967–68 1968–69 1969–70
3	Stephan Hicks	797	2011–12 2012–13 2013–14 2014–15
4	Brian Heinle	785	1997–98 1998–99 1999–00 2000–01
5	Tre Hale-Edmerson	727	2012–13 2013–14 2014–15 2015–16
6	Thomas Shewmake	710	2003–04 2004–05 2005–06 2006–07
7	Cliff Higgins	671	1981–82 1982–83 1983–84
8	Paul McCracken	630	1970–71 1971–72
9	Mahmoud Fofana	607	2023–24 2024–25 2025–26
10	George Robnett	596	1970–71 1971–72 1972–73 1973–74

Season
Rk	Player	Rebounds	Season
1	Lamine Diane	368	2018–19
2	Paul McCracken	330	1970–71
3	Jerry Joseph	319	1969–70
4	Stephen Maxwell	309	2013–14
5	Lenny Daniel	301	2010–11
6	Paul McCracken	300	1971–72
7	Keonte Jones	298	2024–25
	Joshua O'Garro	298	2025–26
9	Jerry Joseph	295	1968–69
10	Brian Heinle	293	2000–01

Single game
Rk	Player	Rebounds	Season	Opponent
1	George Robnett	24	1970–71	UC Irvine
2	Stan Swinger	23	1965–66	Evansville
	Jerry Joseph	23	1968–69	Cal State Stanislaus
4	George Dottin	22	1961–62	Cal State Fullerton
	Mark Cooley	22	1966–67	Cal Poly
	Mark Cooley	22	1966–67	Cal State Fullerton
	Paul McCracken	22	1970–71	Cal Poly Pomona
	Tremaine Townsend	22	2007–08	UC Davis
9	Ed Shaw	21	1970–71	Cal Poly
10	Jerry Joseph	20	1968–69	Cal Poly Pomona
	Keonte Jones	20	2024–25	UC Davis

== Assists ==
Career
Rk	Player	Assists	Seasons
1	Markus Carr	767	1998–99 1999–00 2000–01 2001–02
2	Andre Chevalier	481	1990–91 1991–92 1992–93 1993–94
3	Darius Brown II	431	2018–19 2019–20 2020–21 2021–22
4	Landon Drew	393	2012–13 2013–14 2014–15 2015–16
5	Josh Greene	360	2010–11 2011–12 2012–13 2013–14
6	Ian Boylan	358	2001–02 2002–03 2003–04 2004–05
7	Josh Jenkins	325	2007–08 2008–09
8	Troy Dueker	315	1984–85 1985–86 1986–87 1987–88
9	Tre Hale-Edmerson	303	2012–13 2013–14 2014–15 2015–16
10	Brian Heinle	290	1997–98 1998–99 1999–00 2000–01

Season
Rk	Player	Assists	Season
1	Markus Carr	286	2000–01
2	Josiah Davis	253	2025–26
3	Markus Carr	206	1999–00
4	Josh Jenkins	191	2007–08
5	Darius Brown II	176	2018–19
6	Markus Carr	148	2001–02
7	Kendall Smith	143	2016–17
8	Landon Drew	139	2014–15
9	Keonte Jones	136	2024–25
10	Andre Chevalier	135	1993–94

Single game
Rk	Player	Assists	Season	Opponent
1	Keith Gibbs	15	1990–91	Colorado
	Markus Carr	15	2000–01	Wyoming
	Markus Carr	15	2000–01	Montana State
	Josiah Davis	15	2025–26	Cal Poly
	Josiah Davis	15	2025–26	UC Davis
6	Markus Carr	14	2000–01	Sacramento State
	Josh Jenkins	14	2008–09	UC Davis
8	Markus Carr	13	1998–99	Sacramento State
	Markus Carr	13	2000–01	Vanguard
	Markus Carr	13	1999–00	Cal Poly
	Josh Greene	13	2011–12	Eastern Wash.
	Darius Brown II	13	2020–21	CSU Fullerton
	Josiah Davis	13	2025–26	Cal State Fullerton

== Steals ==
Career
Rk	Player	Steals	Seasons
1	Ian Boylan	272	2001–02 2002–03 2003–04 2004–05
2	Markus Carr	252	1998–99 1999–00 2000–01 2001–02
3	Andre Chevalier	184	1990–91 1991–92 1992–93 1993–94
4	Jerry Joseph	160	1967–68 1968–69 1969–70
5	Jonathan Heard	159	2004–05 2005–06 2006–07 2007–08
6	Derrick Higgins	157	1996–97 1997–98 1998–99
7	Stephan Hicks	155	2011–12 2012–13 2013–14 2014–15
8	Tre Hale-Edmerson	137	2012–13 2013–14 2014–15 2015–16
9	Brooklyn McLinn	134	1989–90 1990–91 1991–92 1992–93 1993–94
	Darius Brown II	134	2018–19 2019–20 2020–21 2021–22

Season
Rk	Player	Steals	Season
1	Ian Boylan	82	2004–05
2	Markus Carr	78	2001–02
	Ian Boylan	78	2003–04
4	Derrick Higgins	74	1996–97
5	Keith Higgins	73	1996–97
6	Derrick Higgins	71	1998–99
7	Davin White	66	2003–04
8	Markus Carr	64	1999–00
9	Joseph Frazier	63	2002–03
10	Derrick Gathers	62	1989–90

Single game
Rk	Player	Steals	Season	Opponent
1	Markus Carr	11	2001–02	Dominican
2	Joseph Frazier	10	2002–03	Bethany
3	Markus Carr	8	2001–02	Pacific
	Joseph Frazier	8	2001–02	Pacific
	Joseph Frazier	8	2002–03	Cal Poly
	Elijah Harkless	8	2019–20	San Francisco St.
7	Derrick Gathers	7	1988–89	Utah State
	Derrick Gathers	7	1989–90	Colorado-Col. Springs
	Keith Gibbs	7	1990–91	Northern Arizona
	Andre Chevalier	7	1993–94	Southwest Missouri St.
	Keith Higgins	7	1996–97	Ohio
	Derrick Higgins	7	1996–97	UC Irvine
	Derrick Higgins	7	1997–98	San Diego
	Derrick Higgins	7	1998–99	Lewis-Clark State
	Ian Boylan	7	2001–02	Southern Illinois
	Ian Boylan	7	2001–02	UC Irvine
	Davin White	7	2003–04	Lafayette
	Ian Boylan	7	2003–04	UC Riverside
	Ian Boylan	7	2004–05	Pacific
	Mike Efevberha	7	2005–06	Tulsa
	Mark Hill	7	2008–09	Idaho
	Stephan Hicks	7	2012–13	San Diego

== Blocks ==
Career
Rk	Player	Blocks	Seasons
1	Tre Hale-Edmerson	188	2012–13 2013–14 2014–15 2015–16
2	Lamine Diane	110	2018–19 2019–20
3	Keonte Jones	92	2023–24 2024–25
4	Thomas Shewmake	82	2003–04 2004–05 2005–06 2006–07
	Lenny Daniel	82	2009–10 2010–11
6	Brian Heinle	76	1997–98 1998–99 1999–00 2000–01
7	Tremaine Townsend	69	2007–08 2008–09
8	Cliff Higgins	66	1981–82 1982–83 1983–84
9	Fidelis Okereke	63	2020–21 2021–22 2022–23
10	Calvin Chitwood	62	2004–05 2005–06 2006–07 2007–08

Season
Rk	Player	Blocks	Season
1	Lamine Diane	72	2018–19
2	Tre Hale-Edmerson	62	2013–14
3	Tre Hale-Edmerson	52	2015–16
4	Keonte Jones	50	2023–24
5	Lenny Daniel	44	2009–10
	Devonte Elliot	44	2014–15
	Tre Hale-Edmerson	44	2014–15
8	Keonte Jones	42	2024–25
9	Lenny Daniel	38	2010–11
	Lamine Diane	38	2019–20

Single game
Rk	Player	Blocks	Season	Opponent
1	Calvin Chitwood	6	2007–08	Washington
	Tre Hale-Edmerson	6	2013–14	La Sierra
	Tre Hale-Edmerson	6	2013–14	Morgan St.
	Lamine Diane	6	2019–20	Hawai'i
5	Lenny Daniel	5	2009–10	Idaho
	Lenny Daniel	5	2009–10	UC Riverside
	Lenny Daniel	5	2009–10	Cal St. Fullerton
	Devonte Elliot	5	2014–15	Montana State
	Devonte Elliot	5	2014–15	Stephen F. Austin
	Devonte Elliot	5	2014–15	UC Riverside
	Tre Hale-Edmerson	5	2013–14	Long Beach St.
	Brandon Perry	5	2012–13	San Diego Christian
	Kevin Taylor	5	1997–98	Sacramento State
	Tre Hale-Edmerson	5	2015–16	Morgan State
	Lamine Diane	5	2018–19	Washington State
	Lamine Diane	5	2018–19	Morgan State
	Lamine Diane	5	2018–19	UC Santa Barbara
	Joshua O'Garro	5	2025–26	Nobel
