= List of Cal State Northridge Matadors men's basketball head coaches =

The following is a list of Cal State Northridge Matadors men's basketball head coaches. There have been seven head coaches of the Matadors in their 65-season history.

Cal State Northridge's current head coach is Andy Newman. He was hired as the Matadors' full-time head coach in April 2023, after serving as interim coach for the 2021–22 season. Johnson replaced Mark Gottfried, who was placed on administrative leave while the school investigated allegations of rules violations committed by Gottfried and his staff.

No.	Tenure	Coach	Years	Record	Pct.
1	1958–1963	Paul Thomas	5	33–97	.254
2	1963–1971	Jerry Ball	8	104–101	.507
3	1971–1996	Pete Cassidy	25	335–336	.499
4	1996–2013	Bobby Braswell	17	251–258	.493
5	2013–2018 (Note: Cal State Northridge vacated nine games in the 2014–15 season. Theus' on-court record is 53–105 (.335).)	Reggie Theus	5	44–105	.295
6	2018–2021	Mark Gottfried	3	37–51	.420
7	2021–2023 (Note: Johnson served as interim head coach for the 2021–22 season, and was named permanent head coach after the season.)	Trent Johnson	2	14–48	.226
Totals		7 coaches	65 seasons	818–996	.451
Records updated through end of 2022–23 season Source
