= TJ Starks =

American basketball player (born 1998)

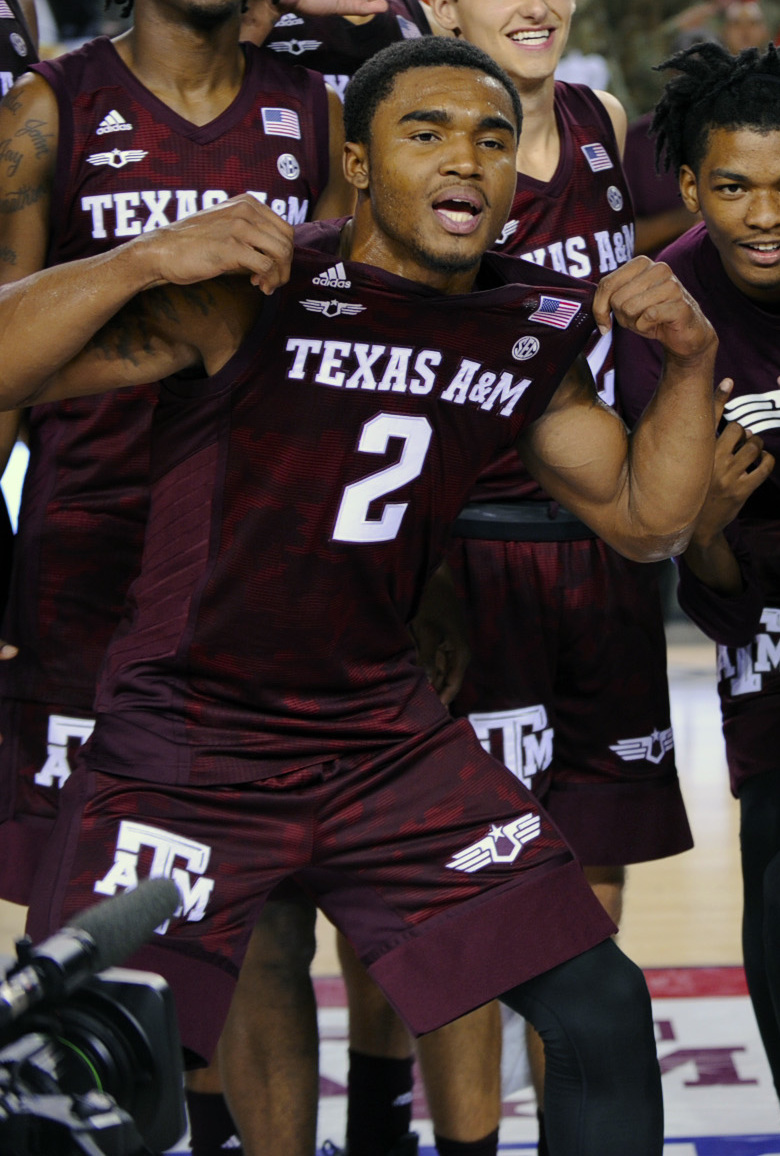
- Starks in 2017

No. 6 – Start Lublin
- Position: Shooting guard / point guard
- League: PLK

Personal information
- Born: September 11, 1998 (age 28)
- Listed height: 6 ft 2 in (1.88 m)
- Listed weight: 196 lb (89 kg)

Career information
- High school: Lancaster (Lancaster, Texas)
- College: Texas A&M (2017–2019); Cal State Northridge (2020–2021)
- NBA draft: 2021: undrafted
- Playing career: 2021–present

Career history
- 2021–2022: Nevėžis Kėdainiai
- 2022: Semt77 Yalovaspor
- 2022–2023: Kolossos Rodou
- 2023: Al-Rayyan
- 2023–2024: Apollon Patras
- 2024: Juventus Utena
- 2024–2025: Astana
- 2025: Tasmania JackJumpers
- 2025–2026: Shijiazhuang Xianglan
- 2026: Jiangsu Dragons
- 2026–present: Start Lublin

Career highlights
- Kazakhstan League champion (2025); Qatari League champion (2023); First-team All-Big West (2021); Big West Newcomer of the Year (2021); SEC All-Freshman Team (2018)

Tahjon Komar "TJ" Starks (born September 11, 1998) is an American professional basketball player for Start Lublin of the Polish Basketball League (PLK). He played college basketball for Texas A&M and Cal State Northridge.

== Early life ==
Starks attended Lancaster High School and played under head coach Ferrin Douglas. As a junior, he averaged 12 points, eight rebounds and three assists per game. Starks led the Tigers to its second consecutive Class 5A State Championship and scored 20 points during the championship-game win against Elkins High School. As a senior, he was selected as the 2017 5A Region II District 10 Offensive Player of the Year as well as a Class 5A All-State selection by the Texas Association of Basketball Coaches. Starks was regarded as a three-star prospect and committed to Texas A&M in June 2016 over an offer from Oklahoma.

== College career ==
As a freshman, Starks made 15 starts and averaged 9.9 points and 2.3 assists per game. He helped lead Texas A&M to the Sweet 16 of the NCAA Tournament and scored 21 points in an upset of North Carolina in the second round. Starks earned SEC All-Freshman Team honors. He made a buzzer-beating three-pointer on January 12, 2019, to propel the Aggies to an 81–80 win over Alabama. On February 26, Starks sustained a right shoulder injury in a loss against LSU, which required hospitalization and forced him to miss the rest of the season. He averaged 12.3 points, 2.2 rebounds, and 3.5 assists per game as a sophomore. Starks missed the first two games of his junior season with an ankle injury he sustained during an exhibition game. On November 14, 2019, he was suspended indefinitely due to being arrested for possession of two ounces or less of marijuana.

Starks entered the transfer portal and was contacted by Mo Williams, an assistant coach at Cal State Northridge. Despite not being familiar with the program, he committed to the Matadors over interest from DePaul. Starks sat out the rest of the season as a redshirt and was expected to help replace the production of the departing Lamine Diane and Terrell Gomez. On February 19, 2021, he scored a career-high 31 points in a 75–74 loss to Hawaii. As a redshirt junior, Starks averaged 21.7 points, 3.0 rebounds, 3.0 assists and 1.4 steals per game. He was named to the First Team All-Big West as well as Big West Newcomer of the Year. Following the season, he declared for the 2021 NBA draft.

== Professional career ==
On September 5, 2021, Starks signed his first professional contract with Rytas Vilnius of the Lithuanian Basketball League. He did not play for Rytas, and in October 2021, he was named in the training camp roster for the Wisconsin Herd of the NBA G League after a successful tryout. He did not play for Wisconsin, and on December 11, 2021, he signed with Nevėžis of the Lithuanian Basketball League. In 10 games for Nevėžis, he averaged 18.9 points, 2.9 rebounds and 4.5 assists per game. On March 26, 2022, Starks signed with Semt77 Yalovaspor of the Turkish Basketball Super League for the rest of the season. In six games, he averaged 13.2 points, 2.8 rebounds, 3.2 assists and 1.5 steals per game.

Starks played for the Sacramento Kings during the 2022 NBA Summer League. He then joined Greek club Kolossos Rodou for the 2022–23 season. In 12 games, he averaged 14.1 points, 1.4 rebounds, 1.8 assists and 1.5 steals per game. In April 2023, he joined Qatari club Al-Rayyan, averaging 18.3 points in 12 games.

On July 31, 2023, Starks signed with Greek club Apollon Patras. On January 8, 2024, he parted ways with the team. On January 14, 2024, he signed with Juventus Utena of the Lithuanian Basketball League until the end of the 2023–24 season.

In August 2024, Starks signed with Astana of the Kazakhstan Championship for the 2024–25 season.

On October 3, 2025, Starks signed with the Tasmania JackJumpers of the Australian National Basketball League (NBL) as an injury replacement for David Johnson. He parted ways with the JackJumpers on November 6, 2025.

On November 9, 2026, he signed with Start Lublin of the Polish Basketball League (PLK).
