= Trinity College of Jacksonville =

Private Baptist college in Jacksonville, Florida

- Former name: Trinity Baptist College
- Motto: Training Students for Life and Ministry
- Type: Private college
- Established: 1974
- Affiliations: Transnational Association of Christian Colleges and Schools
- Religious affiliation: Independent Baptist
- Chancellor: Thomas Messer
- President: Mac Heavener, Jr.
- Administrative staff: 28 full-time
- Undergraduates: 977
- Location: Jacksonville, Florida, United States; 30.3°N 81.783°W
- Colors: Royal blue, gold, black, white
- Sporting affiliations: NCCAA
- Mascot: Eagles
- Website: tcj.edu

Trinity College of Jacksonville (TCJ) is a private independent Baptist college in Jacksonville, Florida. It was founded as Trinity Baptist College in 1974 by Trinity Baptist Church. It is accredited by the Transnational Association of Christian Colleges and Schools.

== History ==
Trinity College of Jacksonville was founded as Trinity Baptist College in 1974. It was originally located on McDuff Avenue near downtown Jacksonville.

In 1997 the college was accredited by the Trans-national Association of Christian Colleges and Schools. In 1998, Trinity Baptist College expanded and moved to the west-side of Jacksonville.

The college changed its name to Trinity College of Jacksonville in 2025.

== Academics ==
Trinity College of Jacksonville offers associate, bachelor's, and master's degree programs.

== Athletics ==
Trinity College of Jacksonville competes as the Eagles in the National Christian College Athletic Association.

The Eagles field women's teams in volleyball, basketball, soccer, and softball. Men's sports include soccer, basketball, and baseball. All sports compete at the Division II level except baseball and softball, which are Division I.

TCJ has won several national titles in various sports including men's soccer (NCCAA 2015), men's basketball (BCNIT 2006, 2009, 2012, 2014), and women's basketball (BCNIT 2019), as well as men’s basketball (BCNIT 2023).

== Notable alumni ==
- David Meeks, Republican member of the Arkansas House of Representatives from Conway, Arkansas
- Paul Chappell, Pastor of Lancaster Baptist Church and President of West Coast Baptist College.
