= 2008–09 Cal State Northridge Matadors men's basketball team =

American college basketball season

2008–09 Cal State Northridge Matadors men's basketball
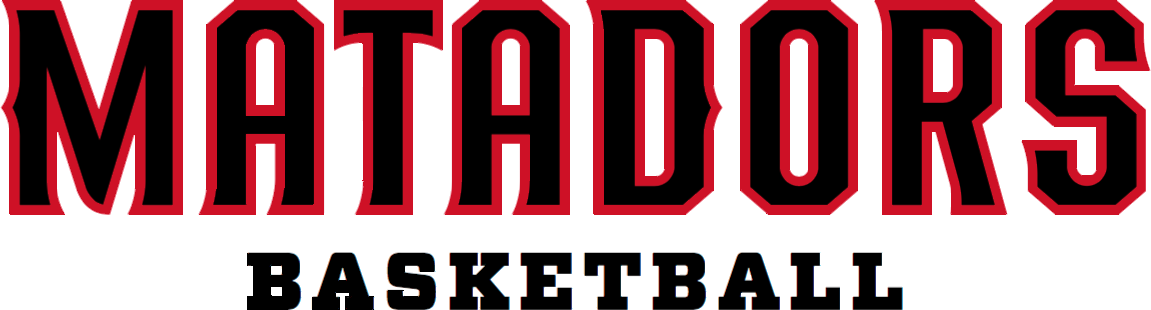

Big West tournament champions Big West Regular season champions

NCAA tournament, First Round
- Conference: Big West Conference
- Record: 17–14 (11–5 Big West)
- Head coach: Bobby Braswell (13th season)
- Home arena: Matadome

2008–09 Big West men's basketball standings
	Conf.				Overall
Team	W		L	PCT	W		L	PCT
Cal State Northridge †	11	–	5	.688	17	–	14	.548
Pacific	10	–	6	.625	21	–	13	.618
Long Beach State	10	–	6	.625	15	–	15	.500
UC Riverside	8	–	8	.500	17	–	13	.567
UC Santa Barbara	8	–	8	.500	16	–	15	.516
UC Irvine	8	–	8	.500	12	–	19	.387
Cal State Fullerton	7	–	9	.438	15	–	17	.469
UC Davis	7	–	9	.438	13	–	19	.406
Cal Poly	3	–	13	.188	7	–	21	.250
† 2009 Big West tournament winner As of April 10, 2009; Rankings from AP poll

The 2008–09 Cal State Northridge Matadors men's basketball team represented California State University, Northridge in the 2008–09 NCAA Division I men's basketball season. The Matadors, led by head coach Bobby Braswell, played their home games at the Matadome in Northridge, California as members of the Big West Conference.

== Roster ==
2008–09 Cal State Northridge Matadors men's basketball team
Players
Coaches

Pos.	#	Name	Height	Weight	Year	Hometown
G	11	Rodrigue Mels	6 ft 3 in (1.91 m)	180 lb (82 kg)	Sr
F	33	Tremaine Townsend	6 ft 9 in (2.06 m)	225 lb (102 kg)	Sr		Phoenix, Arizona

Head coach

- Bobby Braswell (Cal State Northridge)

Assistant coach(es)

Legend

- (C) Team captain
- (S) Suspended
- (I) Ineligible
- (W) Walk-on
- Injured
- Current redshirt

Roster

== Schedule and results ==
Date time, TV	Rank^{#}	Opponent^{#}	Result	Record	Site (attendance) city, state
Regular season
Nov 14, 2008*		Cal Lutheran	W 73–62	1–0	Matadome (1,022); Northridge, California
Nov 18, 2008*		at Stanford	L 85–103	1–1	Maples Pavilion (6,593); Stanford, California
Nov 21, 2008*		at Cal State Bakersfield	L 65–67	1–2	Rabobank Arena (1,976); Bakersfield, California
Nov 24, 2008*		at New Mexico	L 74–85	1–3	The Pit (12,101); Albuquerque, New Mexico
Nov 29, 2008*		at Rider	L 72–85	1–4	Alumni Gymnasium (1,129); Lawrenceville, New Jersey
Dec 1, 2008*		at Drexel	L 47–55	1–5	Daskalakis Athletic Center (1,143); Philadelphia, Pennsylvania
Dec 7, 2008*		at No. 12 UCLA	L 67–85	1–6	Pauley Pavilion (7,687); Los Angeles, California
Dec 9, 2008*		Denver	W 80–53	2–6	Matadome (877); Northridge, California
Dec 18, 2008*		Pepperdine	W 99–64	3–6	Matadome (821); Northridge, California
Dec 22, 2008*		at San Diego State	L 56–72	3–7	Viejas Arena (4,518); San Diego, California
Dec 29, 2008		at Cal State Fullerton	W 90–64	4–7 (1–0)	Titan Gym (1,013); Fullerton, California
Jan 2, 2009		Pacific	L 78–84 ^{OT}	4–8 (1–1)	Matadome (1,128); Northridge, California
Jan 5, 2009		UC Davis	W 84–81	5–8 (2–1)	Matadome (1,018); Northridge, California
Jan 14, 2009		at UC Riverside	W 64–56	6–8 (3–1)	Student Recreation Center Arena (632); Riverside, California
Jan 17, 2009		at Long Beach State	L 68–74	6–9 (3–2)	The Walter Pyramid (2,790); Long Beach, California
Jan 21, 2009		Cal State Fullerton	L 87–91	6–10 (3–3)	Matadome (1,331); Northridge, California
Jan 24, 2009		UC Irvine	W 74–55	7–10 (4–3)	The Matadome (1,308); Northridge, California
Jan 29, 2009		at UC Santa Barbara	W 72–70	8–10 (5–3)	The Thunderdome (3,128); Santa Barbara, California
Jan 31, 2009		at Cal Poly	W 79–68	9–10 (6–3)	Mott Athletic Center (2,820); San Luis Obispo, California
Feb 5, 2009*		Cal State Bakersfield	W 79–62	10–10	Matadome (1,028); Northridge, California
Feb 11, 2009		Cal Poly	W 67–55	11–10 (7–3)	Matadome (1,016); Northridge, California
Feb 14, 2009		UC Riverside	W 77–64	12–10 (8–3)	The Matadome (1,175); Northridge, California
Feb 18, 2009		at UC Irvine	L 51–73	12–11 (8–4)	Bren Events Center (3,450); Irvine, California
Feb 21, 2009*		at Idaho	L 75–78	12–12	Cowan Spectrum (2,202); Moscow, Idaho
Feb 25, 2009*		UC Santa Barbara	W 62–57	13–12 (9–4)	Matadome (875); Northridge, California
Feb 28, 2009*		Long Beach State	W 95–74	14–12 (10–4)	Matadome (1,529); Northridge, California
Mar 5, 2009		at UC Davis	W 99–72	15–12 (11–4)	The Pavilion (1,746); Davis, California
Mar 7, 2009		at Pacific	L 55–62	15–13 (11–5)	Alex G. Spanos Center (3,416); Stockton, California
Big West tournament
Mar 13, 2009*		vs. UC Santa Barbara; Semifinals	W 67–60	16–13	Honda Center (2,875); Anaheim, California
Mar 14, 2009*		vs. Pacific; Championship Game	W 71–66 ^{OT}	17–13	Honda Center (2,272); Anaheim, California
NCAA tournament
Mar 19, 2009*; CBS	(15 W)	vs. (2 W) No. 3 Memphis; First Round	L 70–81	17–14	Sprint Center (17,319); Kansas City, Missouri
*Non-conference game. ^{#}Rankings from AP Poll. (#) Tournament seedings in parentheses. All times are in Pacific.
