= Paul McCracken =

Paul McCracken may refer to:

- Paul McCracken (basketball) (born 1950), American basketball player
- Paul McCracken (economist) (1915–2012), American economist
