= List of Cal State Fullerton Titans men's basketball head coaches =

The following is a list of Cal State Fullerton Titans men's basketball head coaches. There have been 11 head coaches of the Titans in their 63-season history.

Cal State Fullerton's current head coach is Dedrique Taylor. He was hired in March 2013 to replace Andy Newman, who was not retained after spending the 2012–13 season as the Titans' interim head coach.

No.	Tenure	Coach	Years	Record	Pct.
1	1960–1972	Alex Omalov	12	140–177	.442
2	1972–1973	Moe Radovich	1	9–17	.346
3	1973–1980	Bobby Dye	7	109–78	.583
4	1980–1988	George McQuarn	8	122–117	.510
5	1988–1992	John Sneed	4	55–59	.482
6	1992–1994	Brad Holland	2	23–31	.426
7	1994–2000	Bob Hawking	6	59–103	.364
8	2000–2003	Donny Daniels	3	20–64	.238
9	2003–2012 (Note: Burton was fired as head coach in June 2012. Andy Newman served as interim head coach for the following season.)	Bob Burton	9	155–122	.560
10	2012–2013*	Andy Newman	1	14–18	.438
11	2013–present	Dedrique Taylor	10	141–161	.467
Totals		11 coaches	63 seasons	847–946	.472
Records updated through end of 2022–23 season * - Denotes interim head coach. Source
