= Pacific Christian Athletic Conference =

Conference of Christian colleges in Western United States

The Pacific Christian Athletic Conference (PCAC) is a conference of small Christian colleges located in the Western United States based in Everett, Washington, whose mission is to provide opportunities for intercollegiate athletic competition in a Christ-honoring environment. The conference is committed in developing athletes to become Christian leaders for the Kingdom of God.

== Current members ==
- New Hope Christian College Deacons (Eugene, Oregon)
- Bethesda University Flames (Anaheim, California)
- Portland Bible College Wildcats (Portland, Oregon)
- West Coast Baptist College Eagles (Lancaster, California)

== Former nembers ==
- Golden State Baptist College Bears (dropped sports) (Santa Clara, California)
- Multnomah Bible College Lions (left in 2015) (Portland, Oregon)
- Portland Bible College Wildcats (Portland, OR)
- Southwestern College Eagles (left in 2012) (Phoenix, Arizona)
- West Coast Baptist College Eagles (Lancaster, California)
- Life Pacific College (dropped sports) (San Dimas, California)
- Puget Sound Christian College (school closed) was located in (Everett, Washington)

== Accomplishments ==
- West Coast Baptist holds the most conference championships among member institutions
- Current members Portland Bible and Life Pacific have won the ACCA national championship for both the D1 and D2 levels
- Bethesda University is the first PCAC school to win against an NCAA D1 opponent. They accomplished this feat twice, in 2016 and 2022. Both teams were led by Filipino head coach Leo Balayon.
