= 2009 Big West Conference men's basketball tournament =

Basketball tournament in March 2009

- Classification: Division I
- Season: 2008–09
- Teams: 8
- Site: Anaheim Convention Center Arena; Anaheim, California
- Champions: Cal State Northridge (1st title)
- Winning coach: Bobby Braswell (1st title)
- MVP: Rodrigue Mels (Cal State Northridge)

2008–09 Big West men's basketball standings
	Conf.				Overall
Team	W		L	PCT	W		L	PCT
Cal State Northridge †	11	–	5	.688	17	–	14	.548
Pacific	10	–	6	.625	21	–	13	.618
Long Beach State	10	–	6	.625	15	–	15	.500
UC Riverside	8	–	8	.500	17	–	13	.567
UC Santa Barbara	8	–	8	.500	16	–	15	.516
UC Irvine	8	–	8	.500	12	–	19	.387
Cal State Fullerton	7	–	9	.438	15	–	17	.469
UC Davis	7	–	9	.438	13	–	19	.406
Cal Poly	3	–	13	.188	7	–	21	.250
† 2009 Big West tournament winner As of April 10, 2009; Rankings from AP poll

The 2009 Big West Conference men's basketball tournament took place in March 2009.

== Format ==
The top two seeds receive byes into the semifinals. Seeds 3 and 4 receive byes into the quarterfinals. If necessary, the bracket will be adjusted after each round so that the top and bottom seeds in each round play in the same game. The ninth place team, Cal Poly, did not receive a tournament invitation.

== Bracket ==
First round Wednesday, March 11
6	UC Riverside	46
7	Cal State Fullerton	59
5	UC Irvine	68
8	UC Davis	69

Quarterfinals; Thursday, March 12
4	UC Santa Barbara	73
7	Cal State Fullerton	64
3	Pacific	67
8	UC Davis	60

Semifinals; Friday, March 13
1	Cal State Northridge	67
4	UC Santa Barbara	60
2	Long Beach State	60
3	Pacific	65

Finals; Saturday, March 14
1	Cal State Northridge	71
3	Pacific	66
