= Pete Cassidy =

Pete Cassidy may refer to:

- Pete Cassidy (baseball)
- Pete Cassidy (basketball)
