= List of colleges and universities in Oklahoma City =

Oklahoma City and surrounding suburbs are home to a variety of colleges and universities, including:

== Public ==
=== Four-year ===
- Langston University (Langston)
- Oklahoma State University–Oklahoma City
- University of Central Oklahoma (Edmond)
- University of Oklahoma (Norman)
- University of Science and Arts of Oklahoma (Chickasha)

=== Two-year ===
- Oklahoma City Community College
- Redlands Community College (El Reno)
- Rose State College (Midwest City)

== Private ==
- American Christian College and Seminary
- DeVry University - Oklahoma City campus
- Downtown College Consortium
- Heartland Baptist Bible College
- Hillsdale Free-Will Baptist College (Moore)
- Metropolitan College
- Mid-America Christian University
- Oklahoma Baptist College
- Oklahoma Baptist University (Shawnee)
- Oklahoma Christian University
- Oklahoma City University
- Southern Nazarene University (Bethany)
- Southwestern Christian University
- University of Phoenix - Oklahoma City campuses
