= Heartland Baptist Bible College =

Private college in Oklahoma City, Oklahoma, US

Coordinates: 35°28′38″N 97°36′24″W

- Type: Private unaccredited Bible college
- Established: 1966
- Religious affiliation: Independent Baptist
- Chancellor: Sam Davison
- President: Jason Gaddis
- Administrative staff: 50
- Location: Oklahoma City, Oklahoma, United States
- Website: www.heartlandbaptist.edu

Heartland Baptist Bible College is a private independent Baptist Bible college in Oklahoma City, Oklahoma. Before 1998, the college was located in San Dimas, California, and was known as Pacific Coast Baptist Bible College.

== History ==
In November 1966, the Western Baptist Bible Fellowship, composed of pastors from that region, met in Las Vegas and created the Pacific Coast Baptist Fellowship. The school received the approval of the Baptist Bible Fellowship International (BBFI), but was not owned by the BBFI and retained its independence.

Classes at Pacific Coast Baptist Bible College, a co-educational college, began in fall, 1966 in rented facilities upstairs at the NE corner of the intersection of Glassell and Chapman - "The Circle" - in Orange, California. Under the direction of Rev. Ted Hicks, one of the founders and the first president, and then pastor of Bethel Baptist Church in Santa Ana, the college grew and became a preacher-training facility. From Orange, it moved to progressively larger campuses in Walnut and Pasadena. In 1972, the college acquired a 150-acre (0.61 km^{2}) campus in San Dimas that had been built in 1928 as a home for underprivileged boys, then became a campus of California State Polytechnic University. The school enforced a strict code of student conduct. Enrollment at PCBBC reached 500 students in the late 1970s, with students coming mainly from 300 churches in the western United States which were also responsible for a portion of the college's budget. However, enrollment declined in the following decade and by 1990 the school had 170 students. The college then proposed to demolish the campus, sell 53 acres (210,000 m^{2}) for a luxury home development, donate 80 acres (320,000 m^{2}) for park land, and rebuild a more compact campus on the remainder.

In Summer 1998, because of its financial problems and policy disagreements within the BBFI education establishment, the school moved to Oklahoma City, and was renamed Heartland Baptist Bible College. Heartland also withdrew from its affiliation with the BBFI.

== Accreditation status ==
Heartland Baptist Bible College is not accredited by any recognized accreditation body, nor does it seek accreditation.

== Sports ==
Although Pacific Coast Baptist Bible College did have intercollegiate sports teams when it was in California, HBBC does not now participate in any intercollegiate leagues, but it does offer intramural sports for students who wish to participate.

== Notable alumni ==
- Paul Chappell, Pastor of Lancaster Baptist Church and President of West Coast Baptist College
- Diane Downs, convicted in the 1983 shooting of her three children (did not graduate and was expelled)
- David J. Edmondson, former RadioShack CEO attended the college but falsely claimed to have received a psychology degree from Pacific Coast Baptist Bible College.
- Ralph Shortey, former Oklahoma State Senator and convicted child sex trafficker
