= Terrell Gomez =

American basketball player

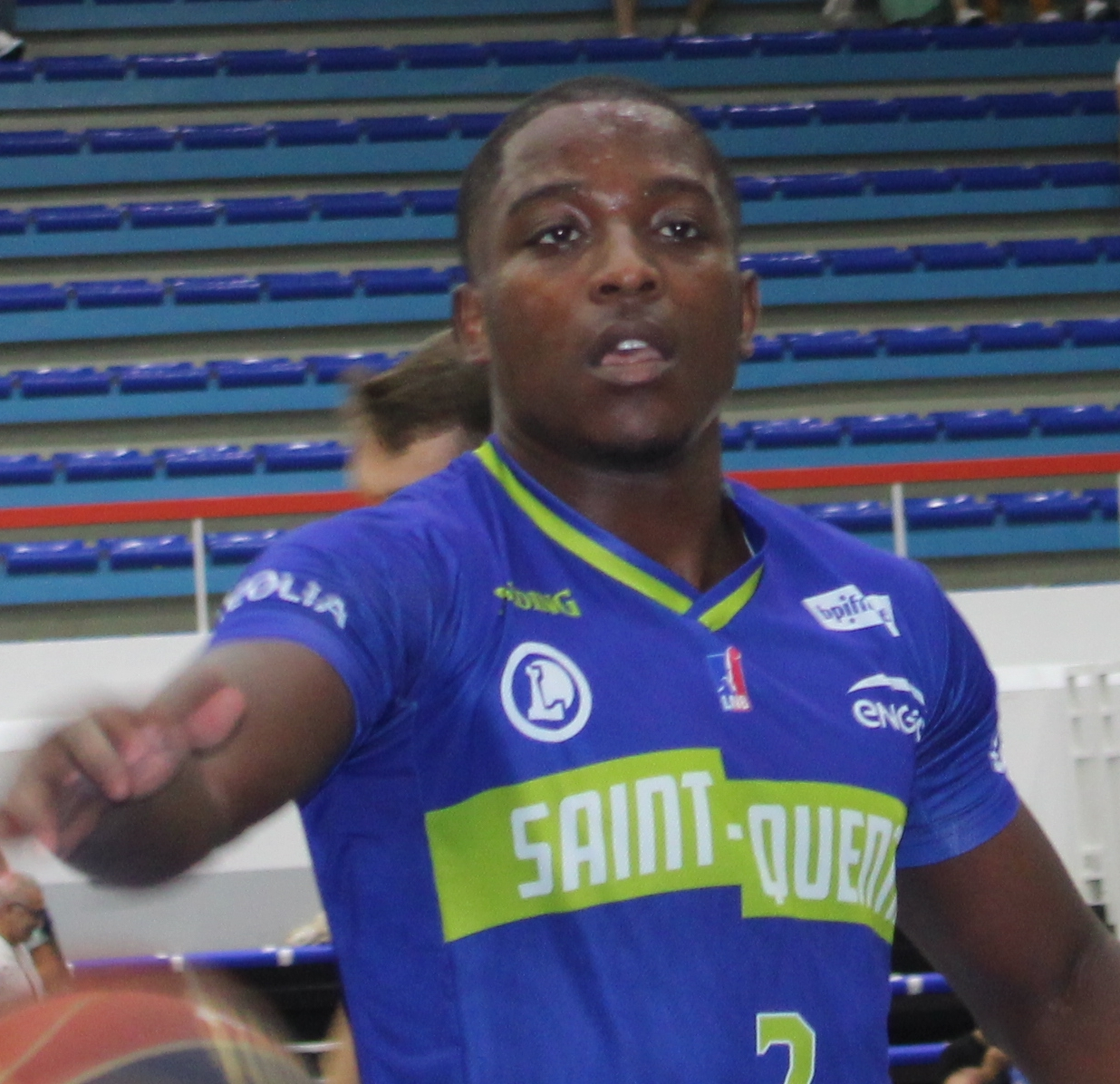

Quimper
- Position: Point guard
- League: LNB Pro B

Personal information
- Born: February 5, 1998 (age 28)
- Listed height: 5 ft 8 in (1.73 m)
- Listed weight: 165 lb (75 kg)

Career information
- High school: Inglewood (Inglewood, California); Middlebrooks Academy (Los Angeles, California)
- College: Cal State Northridge (2017–2020); San Diego State (2020–2021)
- NBA draft: 2021: undrafted
- Playing career: 2021–present

Career history
- 2021–2022: Final Gençlik
- 2022: JDA Dijon
- 2023: Hamburg Towers
- 2023–2024: Sokół Łańcut
- 2024–2025: Chorale Roanne Basket
- 2025–present: Quimper

Career highlights
- 2x First-team All-Big West (2019, 2020); Big West Freshman of the Year (2018)

Terrell Gomez (born February 5, 1998) is an American professional basketball player for Quimper of the LNB Pro B. He played college basketball for Cal State Northridge and San Diego State.

== Early life and high school career ==
Gomez attended Inglewood High School. As a junior and senior, he earned Daily Breeze all-area honors. Gomez was a three-time All-Bay League selection as well as the league's Most Outstanding Player in 2015 and was named to the All-CIF Division I-AA Team in 2014. He had scholarship offers from Oral Roberts and Liberty, but both were rescinded when both schools had coaching changes. Gomez decided to attend Middlebrooks Academy as a postgraduate student and took classes at East Los Angeles College. He committed to play college basketball for Cal State Northridge.

== College career ==
Gomez averaged 11.7 points, 3.6 assists and 2.4 rebounds per game as a freshman. He was named Big West Freshman of the Year. As a sophomore, Gomez averaged 19.2 points, 2.1 rebounds and 2.8 assists per game. He was named to the First Team All-Big West. On November 13, 2019, Gomez scored a career-high 33 points in a 94–82 loss to Pepperdine. As a junior, he averaged 19.8 points, 2.5 rebounds, and 2.3 assists per game while shooting 43.9 percent from the field, 44 percent from three-point range, and a Division I-leading 94.8 percent from the free throw line. Gomez joined teammate Lamine Diane on the First Team All-Big West, becoming the first pair of Cal State Northridge players to be named to the first team twice. He transferred to San Diego State for his senior season. As a senior, Gomez averaged 8.6 points, 1.5 rebounds, and 2.3 assists per game. He declined to take the NCAA's granting of an additional year of eligibility, instead opting to turn professional.

== Professional career ==
On July 13, 2021, Gomez signed his first professional contract with Final Gençlik of the Turkish Basketball First League. He averaged 21.6 points, 3.8 assists and 3.4 rebounds per game.

On February 22, 2022, Gomez signed with JDA Dijon Basket of the LNB Pro A and the Basketball Champions League.

On July 19, 2023, he signed with Hamburg Towers of the Basketball Bundesliga.

On June 1, 2024, he signed with Chorale Roanne Basket of the LNB Pro A.

== Personal life ==
His brother, DaShawn Gomez, played basketball at Iona.

His parents are from Trinidad and Tobago.
