= 2008–09 UC Irvine Anteaters men's basketball team =

American college basketball season

2008–09 UC Irvine Anteaters men's basketball
- Conference: Big West Conference
- Record: 12–19 (8–8 Big West)
- Head coach: Pat Douglass (12th season)
- Home arena: Bren Events Center

2008–09 Big West men's basketball standings
	Conf.				Overall
Team	W		L	PCT	W		L	PCT
Cal State Northridge †	11	–	5	.688	17	–	14	.548
Pacific	10	–	6	.625	21	–	13	.618
Long Beach State	10	–	6	.625	15	–	15	.500
UC Riverside	8	–	8	.500	17	–	13	.567
UC Santa Barbara	8	–	8	.500	16	–	15	.516
UC Irvine	8	–	8	.500	12	–	19	.387
Cal State Fullerton	7	–	9	.438	15	–	17	.469
UC Davis	7	–	9	.438	13	–	19	.406
Cal Poly	3	–	13	.188	7	–	21	.250
† 2009 Big West tournament winner As of April 10, 2009; Rankings from AP poll

The 2008–09 UC Irvine Anteaters men's basketball team represented the University of California, Irvine during the 2008–09 NCAA Division I men's basketball season. The Anteaters were led by 12th year head coach Pat Douglass and played at the Bren Events Center. They were members of the Big West Conference.

== Previous season ==
The 2007–08 UC Irvine Anteaters men's basketball team finished the season with a record of 18–16 and 9–7 in Big West play.

=== Roster ===
2008–09 UC Irvine Anteaters men's basketball team
Players
Coaches

Pos.	#	Name	Height	Weight	Year	Hometown
C	4	Zack Atkinson	6 ft 9 in (2.06 m)	220 lb (100 kg)	Jr	Bishopville, SC
F	53	Kevin Bland	6 ft 8 in (2.03 m)	235 lb (107 kg)	Sr	Tracy, CA
G	22	Chad DeCasas	6 ft 5 in (1.96 m)	215 lb (98 kg)	Jr	Mission Viejo, CA
F	3	Joe Eberhard	6 ft 5 in (1.96 m)	185 lb (84 kg)	Fr	Newport Beach, CA
F	20	Adam Folker	6 ft 9 in (2.06 m)	225 lb (102 kg)	Fr	Markham, Ontario
G	5	Michael Hunter	5 ft 10 in (1.78 m)	160 lb (73 kg)	Jr	Aurora, CO
G	22	Jonas Lalenzadeh	6 ft 5 in (1.96 m)	205 lb (93 kg)	Fr	Irvine, CA
G	23	Brett Lauer	6 ft 1 in (1.85 m)	180 lb (82 kg)	Sr	Concord, CA
G	1	Darren Moore	6 ft 3 in (1.91 m)	190 lb (86 kg)	So	Chino Hills, CA
G	10	Patrick Rembert	6 ft 0 in (1.83 m)	188 lb (85 kg)	So	Long Beach, CA
G	42	Ryan Staker	6 ft 8 in (2.03 m)	225 lb (102 kg)	Jr	Las Vegas, NV
G	3	Derrick Strings	6 ft 2 in (1.88 m)	180 lb (82 kg)	So	Pasadena, CA
F	2	Rashaad Ubah	6 ft 6 in (1.98 m)	210 lb (95 kg)	Fr	Riverside, CA
F	34	Eric Wise	6 ft 6 in (1.98 m)	240 lb (109 kg)	Fr	Riverside, CA

Head coach

Pat Douglass (Pacific)

Assistant coach(es)

Legend

- (C) Team captain
- (S) Suspended
- (I) Ineligible
- (W) Walk-on
- Injured
- Current redshirt

Roster
Last update: September 19, 2017

== Schedule ==
Date time, TV	Rank^{#}	Opponent^{#}	Result	Record	Site (attendance) city, state
Regular Season
November 15, 2008*		at No. 18 USC	L 55–78	0–1	Galen Center (4,089); Los Angeles, CA
November 19, 2008*		Eastern Washington	L 69–74	0–2	Bren Events Center (1,021); Irvine, CA
November 21, 2008*		Oregon	L 77–84	0–3	Bren Events Center (4,206); Irvine, CA
November 28, 2008*		at Idaho	L 47–101	0–4	Cowan Spectrum (648); Moscow, ID
November 30, 2008*		at Eastern Washington	L 64–78	0–5	Reese Court (1,264); Cheney, WA
December 2, 2008*		at Utah State	L 62–74	0–6	Smith Spectrum (7,438); Logan, UT
December 7, 2008*		at Pepperdine	W 71–63	1–6	Firestone Fieldhouse (404); Malibu, CA
December 16, 2008*		Seattle	L 52–55	1–7	Bren Events Center (1,081); Irvine, CA
December 20, 2008*		vs. Middle Tennessee; Basketball Travelers Tip-Off Tournament	L 52–65	1–8	JQH Arena (5,831); Springfield, MO
December 21, 2008*		at Missouri State; Basketball Travelers Tip-Off Tournament	L 48–57	1–9	JQH Arena (5,596); Springfield, MO
December 22, 2008*		vs. Norfolk State; Basketball Travelers Tip-Off Tournament	W 64–51	2–9	JQH Arena (5,758); Springfield, MO
December 27, 2008*		Utah	L 52–60	2–10	Bren Events Center (1,919); Irvine, CA
January 3, 2009		Cal State Fullerton	W 78–74 ^{OT}	3–10 (1–0)	Bren Events Center (1,619); Irvine, CA
January 8, 2009		at UC Santa Barbara	L 61–68	3–11 (1–1)	UC Santa Barbara Events Center (1,628); Santa Barbara, CA
January 10, 2009		at Cal Poly	W 80–63	4–11 (2–1)	Mott Gym (1,873); San Luis Obispo, CA
January 15, 2009		Pacific	W 52–51	5–11 (3–1)	Bren Events Center (1,049); Irvine, CA
January 17, 2009		UC Davis	L 85–88	5–12 (3–2)	Bren Events Center (2,646); Irvine, CA
January 21, 2009*		Cal State Bakersfield	W 85–72	6–12	Bren Events Center (933); Irvine, CA
January 24, 2009		at Cal State Northridge	L 55–74	6–13 (3–3)	Matadome (1,308); Northridge, CA
January 29, 2009		at UC Riverside	W 71–66	7–13 (4–3)	Student Recreation Center (1,010); Riverside, CA
January 31, 2009		Long Beach State	L 63–67	7–14 (4–4)	Bren Events Center (2,917); Irvine, CA
February 5, 2009		Cal Poly	W 64–57	8–14 (5–4)	Bren Events Center (908); Irvine, CA
February 7, 2009		UC Santa Barbara	L 56–65	8–15 (5–5)	Bren Events Center (2,310); Irvine, CA
February 12, 2009		at UC Davis	L 76–85	8–16 (5–6)	The Pavilion (1,007); Davis, CA
February 14, 2009		at Pacific	L 55–65	8–17 (5–7)	Alex G. Spanos Center (2,972); Stockton, CA
February 18, 2009		Cal State Northridge	W 73–51	9–17 (6–7)	Bren Events Center (3,450); Irvine, CA
February 21, 2009*		at Hawaii; BracketBusters	W 76–70	10–17	Stan Sheriff Center (6,141); Honolulu, HI
February 26, 2009		at Long Beach State	L 74–75	10–18 (6–8)	Walter Pyramid (2,916); Long Beach, CA
February 28, 2009		UC Riverside	W 78–72 ^{OT}	11–18 (7–8)	Bren Events Center (3,693); Irvine, CA
March 7, 2009		at Cal State Fullerton	W 65–62	12–18 (8–8)	Titan Gym (2,781); Fullerton, CA
Big West Conference tournament
March 11, 2009		vs. UC Davis; First Round	L 68–69	12–19	Anaheim Convention Center (1,691); Anaheim, CA
*Non-conference game. ^{#}Rankings from AP Poll. (#) Tournament seedings in parentheses. All times are in Pacific Time.

== Awards and honors ==
- Eric Wise
  - All-Big West Second Team
  - Big West All-Freshman Team
