= Trinity College of Florida =

American Bible college

Coordinates: 28.194838°N 82.678308°W

- Former name: Florida Bible Institute (1932–1946)
- Type: Private Bible college
- Established: 1932
- Affiliations: USCAA
- President: Christopher Gates
- Location: Trinity, Florida, United States
- Colors: Black and gold
- Mascot: Tigers
- Website: trinitycollege.edu

Trinity College of Florida is a private interdenominational evangelical Bible college in Trinity, Florida. It was founded in 1932.

== History ==
The institution was founded as Florida Bible Institute in 1932, in Temple Terrace by William T. Watson, an evangelical tent preacher from North Carolina and pastor of a large Christian and Missionary Alliance church in St. Petersburg. The name was changed to Trinity College of Florida in 1947.

== Accreditation ==
The college was accredited by the Commission on Accreditation of the Association for Biblical Higher Education in 1996 and maintains this accreditation today.

== Athletics ==
Trinity College of Florida's athletic program consists of seven sports teams: men's basketball, men's soccer, men's football, men's baseball, women's soccer, women's basketball, and women's volleyball. All four participate in the USCAA Division I.

The Trinity College men's basketball program took first place in the Bible College National Invitational Tournament in 2016.

On July 19, 2024, Trinity became one of the newest nine member schools to join the United States Collegiate Athletic Association (USCAA), effective beginning the 2024–25 school year.

== Notable alumni ==
- Billy Graham – evangelist
- KB – Christian hip hop artist
- Jimmy G. Tharpe – founder of Louisiana Baptist University

== Notable faculty ==
- Thomas E. Woodward
