= 2001 Big Sky Conference men's basketball tournament =

- Classification: Division I
- Season: 2000–01
- Teams: 6
- Site: Matadome; Northridge, Los Angeles, CA
- Champions: Cal State Northridge (1st title)
- Winning coach: Bobby Braswell (1st title)
- MVP: Brian Heinle (Cal State Northridge)

2000–01 Big Sky men's basketball standings
| | Conf. | | | | Overall |
| Team | W | | L | PCT | W | | L | PCT |
|---|---|---|---|---|---|---|---|---|
| Cal State Northridge † | 13 | – | 3 | .813 | 22 | – | 10 | .688 |
| Eastern Washington | 11 | – | 5 | .688 | 17 | – | 11 | .607 |
| Idaho State | 10 | – | 6 | .625 | 14 | – | 14 | .500 |
| Montana State | 8 | – | 8 | .500 | 16 | – | 14 | .533 |
| Northern Arizona | 8 | – | 8 | .500 | 15 | – | 14 | .517 |
| Weber State | 8 | – | 8 | .500 | 15 | – | 14 | .517 |
| Montana | 6 | – | 10 | .375 | 11 | – | 16 | .407 |
| Portland State | 6 | – | 10 | .375 | 9 | – | 18 | .333 |
| Sacramento State | 2 | – | 14 | .125 | 5 | – | 22 | .185 |
† Conference tournament winner Rankings from AP Poll

The 2001 Big Sky Conference men's basketball tournament was held March 8–10 at the Matadome at California State University, Northridge in the Northridge neighborhood of Los Angeles, California.

Top-seeded hosts Cal State Northridge defeated Eastern Washington in the championship game, 73–58, to win their first, and only, Big Sky men's basketball tournament title (CSUN departed the Big Sky the following season).

The Matadors, in turn, received an automatic bid to the 2001 NCAA tournament. No other Big Sky members were invited this year.

== Format ==
No new teams were added to the Big Sky prior to the 2000–01 season, leaving total membership at nine.

No changes were made to the existing tournament format. Only the top six teams from the regular season conference standings were invited to the tournament. The two top teams were given byes into the semifinals while the third- through sixth-seeded teams were placed and paired into the preliminary quarterfinal round. Following the quarterfinals, the two victorious teams were re-seeded for the semifinal round, with the lowest-seeded remaining team paired with the tournament's highest seed and vis-versa for the other.

== Bracket ==
Quarterfinals; Thursday, March 8
3 | Idaho State | 67
6 | Weber State | 86
4 | Montana State | 62
5 | Northern Arizona | 65

Semifinals; Friday, March 9
1 | Cal State Northridge | 91
6 | Weber State | 74
2 | Eastern Washington | 58
5 | Northern Arizona | 53

Championship; Saturday, March 10
1 | Cal State Northridge | 73
2 | Eastern Washington | 58

== See also ==
- Big Sky Conference women's basketball tournament
