= 2000–01 Cal State Northridge Matadors men's basketball team =

American college basketball season

2000–01 Cal State Northridge Matadors men's basketball
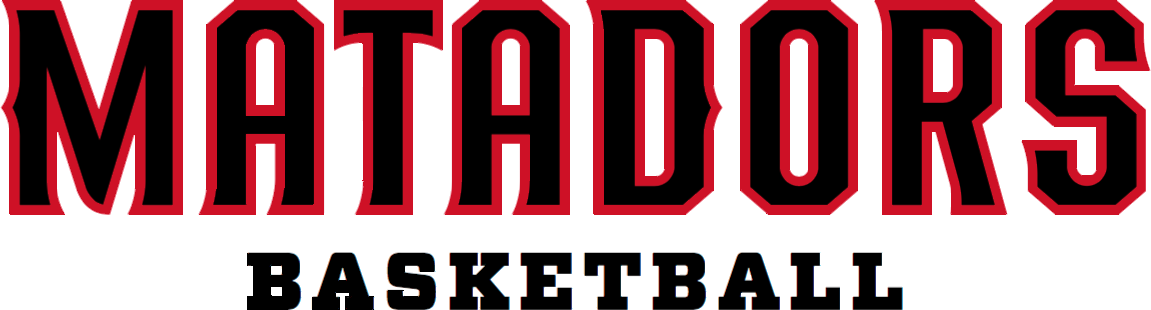

Big Sky tournament champions Big Sky Regular season champions

NCAA tournament
- Conference: Big Sky Conference
- Record: 22–10 (13–3 Big Sky)
- Head coach: Bobby Braswell (5th season)
- Home arena: Matadome

2000–01 Big Sky men's basketball standings
	Conf.				Overall
Team	W		L	PCT	W		L	PCT
Cal State Northridge †	13	–	3	.813	22	–	10	.688
Eastern Washington	11	–	5	.688	17	–	11	.607
Idaho State	10	–	6	.625	14	–	14	.500
Montana State	8	–	8	.500	16	–	14	.533
Northern Arizona	8	–	8	.500	15	–	14	.517
Weber State	8	–	8	.500	15	–	14	.517
Montana	6	–	10	.375	11	–	16	.407
Portland State	6	–	10	.375	9	–	18	.333
Sacramento State	2	–	14	.125	5	–	22	.185
† 2001 Big Sky tournament winner Rankings from AP Poll

The 2000–01 Cal State Northridge Matadors men's basketball team represented California State University, Northridge during the 2000–01 NCAA Division I men's basketball season. The Matadors, led by head coach Bobby Braswell, played their home games at the Matadome in Northridge, California as members of the Big Sky Conference.Cal State Northridge won the Big Sky regular season and Big Sky tournament titles, the latter earning them the conference's automatic bid to the NCAA tournament – the first appearance in program history. Playing as the No. 13 seed in the Midwest region, the Matadors were beaten by No. 4 seed and perennial power Kansas in the opening round.

== Roster ==
2000–01 Cal State Northridge Matadors men's basketball team
Players	Coaches
Pos. / # / Name / Height / Weight / Year / Hometown; C / / Brian Heinle / 6 ft 9 in (2.06 m) / — / Sr	Head coach: Bobby Braswell (Cal State Northridge); Assistant coach(es) Legend: (C) Team captain; (S) Suspended; (I) Ineligible; (W) Walk-on; Injured; Current redshirt; Roster

== Schedule and results ==
Date time, TV	Rank^{#}	Opponent^{#}	Result	Record	Site (attendance) city, state
Regular season
Nov 19, 2000*		Howard	W 90–73	1–0	The Matadome; Northridge, California
Nov 21, 2000*		at No. 15 UCLA	W 78–74	2–0	Pauley Pavilion (6,448); Los Angeles, California
Nov 25, 2000*		at UNLV	L 69–70	2–1	Thomas & Mack Center; Las Vegas, Nevada
Nov 28, 2000*		Cal Poly Pomona	W 75–50	3–1	The Matadome; Northridge, California
Dec 1, 2000*		vs. Kent State	W 89–85 ^{OT}	4–1	Bradley Center; Milwaukee, Wisconsin
Dec 2, 2000*		at Marquette	L 66–69	4–2	Bradley Center; Milwaukee, Wisconsin
Dec 5, 2000*		at No. 12 USC	L 90–99	4–3	L.A. Sports Arena; Los Angeles, California
Dec 7, 2000*		Wyoming	W 74–71	5–3	The Matadome; Northridge, California
Dec 18, 2000*		at James Madison	W 84–70	6–3	JMU Convocation Center; Harrisonburg, Virginia
Dec 21, 2000*		vs. UAB; Nike Festival	L 67–71	6–4	Stan Sheriff Center; Honolulu, Hawaii
Dec 22, 2000*		at Hawaii; Nike Festival	L 70–76	6–5	Stan Sheriff Center (5,727); Honolulu, Hawaii
Dec 23, 2000*		vs. Georgia State; Nike Festival	L 88–97	6–6	Stan Sheriff Center; Honolulu, Hawaii
Dec 27, 2000*		Vanguard	W 96–51	7–6	The Matadome; Northridge, California
Jan 4, 2001		at Weber State	W 89–78	8–6 (1–0)	Dee Events Center; Ogden, Utah
Jan 6, 2001		at Sacramento State	W 95–82	9–6 (2–0)	Hornets Nest; Sacramento, California
Jan 11, 2001		at Northern Arizona	L 75–76	9–7 (2–1)	Walkup Skydome; Flagstaff, Arizona
Jan 13, 2001		Idaho State	W 90–73	10–7 (3–1)	The Matadome; Northridge, California
Jan 18, 2001		Portland State	W 103–83	11–7 (4–1)	The Matadome; Northridge, California
Jan 20, 2001		Eastern Washington	L 75–88	11–8 (4–2)	The Matadome; Northridge, California
Jan 25, 2001		at Montana State	W 72–65	12–8 (5–2)	Worthington Arena; Bozeman, Montana
Jan 27, 2001		at Montana	W 74–65	13–8 (6–2)	Dahlberg Arena; Missoula, Montana
Jan 31, 2001		Sacramento State	W 100–73	14–8 (7–2)	The Matadome; Northridge, California
Feb 1, 2001		Weber State	W 96–86	15–8 (8–2)	The Matadome; Northridge, California
Feb 8, 2001		at Idaho State	L 84–89	15–9 (8–3)	Holt Arena; Pocatello, Idaho
Feb 17, 2001		Northern Arizona	W 78–72	16–9 (9–3)	The Matadome; Northridge, California
Feb 22, 2001		Montana	W 92–68	17–9 (10–3)	The Matadome; Northridge, California
Feb 24, 2001		Montana State	W 85–65	18–9 (11–3)	The Matadome; Northridge, California
Mar 1, 2001		at Eastern Washington	W 86–84	19–9 (12–3)	Reese Court; Cheney, Washington
Mar 3, 2001		at Portland State	W 81–75	20–9 (13–3)	Peter W. Stott Center; Portland, Oregon
Big Sky tournament
Mar 9, 2001*	(1)	(6) Weber State; Semifinals	W 91–74	21–9	The Matadome; Northridge, California
Mar 10, 2001*	(1)	(2) Eastern Washington; Championship game	W 73–58	22–9	The Matadome; Northridge, California
NCAA tournament
Mar 16, 2001*	(13 MW)	vs. (4 MW) No. 12 Kansas; First round	L 75–99	22–10	University of Dayton Arena; Dayton, Ohio
*Non-conference game. ^{#}Rankings from AP Poll. (#) Tournament seedings in parentheses. All times are in Pacific.
