= David Edmondson =

American businessman

David J. Edmondson (born June 10, 1959) is an American businessman, known for his career at RadioShack and his termination as CEO for falsifying his educational background.

== Early life and education ==
David J. Edmondson was born June 10, 1959, in Methuen, Massachusetts. His mother Jeannette was a homemaker, and his adoptive father was a US soldier. Like most children of military families, Edmondson moved a great deal throughout his early life, including periods in Germany and Fort Jackson, South Carolina, before settling at Fort Carson, Colorado, in 1968, where Edmondson remained until his graduation from Alpha Omega Christian School in 1977.

Edmondson moved to San Dimas, California, in 1977 where he attended Pacific Coast Baptist Bible College (PCBBC). While at Pacific Coast Baptist Bible College, Edmondson began his study to become a Baptist minister. Edmondson left California after one year on campus and returned to Colorado where he became the associate pastor of Security Baptist Temple, in Security, Colorado. He continued his studies through correspondence with PCBBC and claimed he earned his ThG (Graduate of Theology) in May 1980.

Although he has attended several colleges, he does not currently hold any academic degrees.

== Career ==
After his ordination, Edmondson relocated to Omaha, Nebraska, where he founded the Twin Cities Baptist Church. He started the church in a borrowed space donated by an Omaha businessman.

In 1982, Edmondson returned to Colorado Springs and attempted to start another church. The second church was not successful and Edmondson left the full-time ministry.

In 1983, Edmondson again relocated, this time to Cleveland, Ohio, and went to work for direct mail advertising company ADVO System, Inc. While serving as national account marketing executive, Edmondson worked on developing and implementing marketing programs with various divisions of Tandy Corporation, including its RadioShack Division.

=== RadioShack ===
Edmondson held positions as vice president of marketing (1994–1995), senior vice president of marketing and advertising (1995–1997), executive vice president and chief operating officer (1997–2000), president and chief operating officer (2000–2005) and chief executive officer (2005-2006).

==== Arrests, newspaper investigation, resignation ====
In January 2005, shortly after RadioShack announced that Edmondson would be taking over as CEO, he was arrested in Southlake, Texas, for driving while intoxicated, his third such charge. Edmondson pleaded guilty and was sentenced to 30 days in jail. The incident prompted the Fort Worth Star-Telegram to begin looking more closely at his past.

Edmondson resigned in February 2006, after the Star-Telegram disclosed that he had falsified his résumé and biography, claiming two non-existent college degrees.

=== Post-RadioShack ===
In 2007, Edmondson founded EasySale, an Internet-based consignment and liquidation company based in Arlington, Texas. In 2009, he co-founded and became CEO of E-Recycling Corps (now HYLA Mobile), an enterprise engaged in the collection, refurbishment and global redistribution of used wireless devices. According to Pitchbook-October 1, 2018, HYLA Mobile is the most valuable venture capital backed company in the State of Texas, valued at $650 million. According to the SEC (Security and Exchange Commission) filing on March 3, 2021, Edmondson became a member of the board of directors for the blank check SPAC (Special Purpose Acquisition Company) Aeon Acquisition Corp. managing 125 million dollars.
