= Paul Chappell =

American pastor

Paul W. Chappell
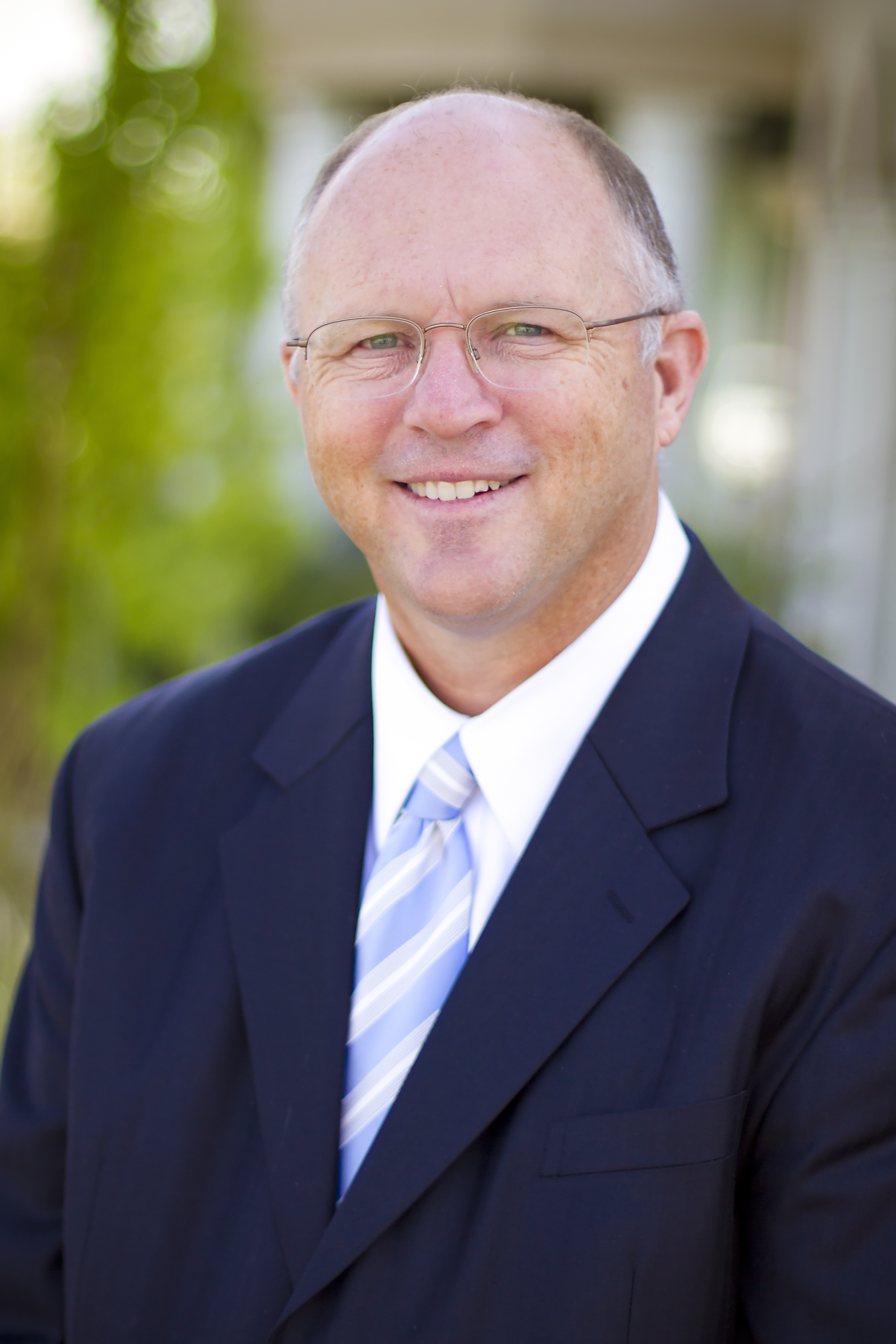
- Born: 7 April 1962 (age 64); Minneapolis, Minnesota, U.S.
- Education: Pacific Coast Baptist Bible College (BA); Louisiana Baptist University (MA); Trinity Baptist College (DDiv)
- Spouse: Terrie Blanco Chappell (m. 1980)

Paul Chappell is an American pastor who has served as the senior pastor of Lancaster Baptist Church since 1986. He is the president and founder of West Coast Baptist College, Lancaster Baptist School, and Striving Together Publications.

Chappell is heard on the Daily in the Word radio broadcast. He serves on the Board of Trustees for Baptist International Missions Inc. He is the founder of the Spiritual Leadership Conference held annually in September and in January for Spanish pastors, and bi-annually in Asia.

== Early life and education ==
Chappell was born in Minneapolis, Minnesota and raised in Northern California. He graduated from high school in Seoul, South Korea. Chappell earned a Bachelor of Arts degree in pastoral theology from Pacific Coast Baptist Bible College in 1983. While attending college, he founded and pastored the Seaside Baptist Church near Indio, California. He received a Master of Arts degree from the Louisiana Baptist University in Shreveport, Louisiana, and was later honored with a Doctor of Divinity degree from Trinity Baptist College in Jacksonville, Florida, in 1995.

== Career ==
In 1986, twelve members of Lancaster Baptist Church in Lancaster, California called Chappell to take the role of pastor. In spite of the church being in foreclosure and therefore offering no pastoral salary, Chappell and his family moved to Lancaster. In the first Sunday evening service, Chappell preached an exegetical evangelism-themed message based on Philippians 1:27, with a call-to-action for the church to “strive together [with Chappell] to reach the community with the gospel". In the following months, Chappell was credited to have "personally knocked on five hundred doors each week, inviting people to church and telling them how they could know Jesus Christ as their Savior". Chappell's style of sermon was to exegete portions of scripture "verse-by-verse".

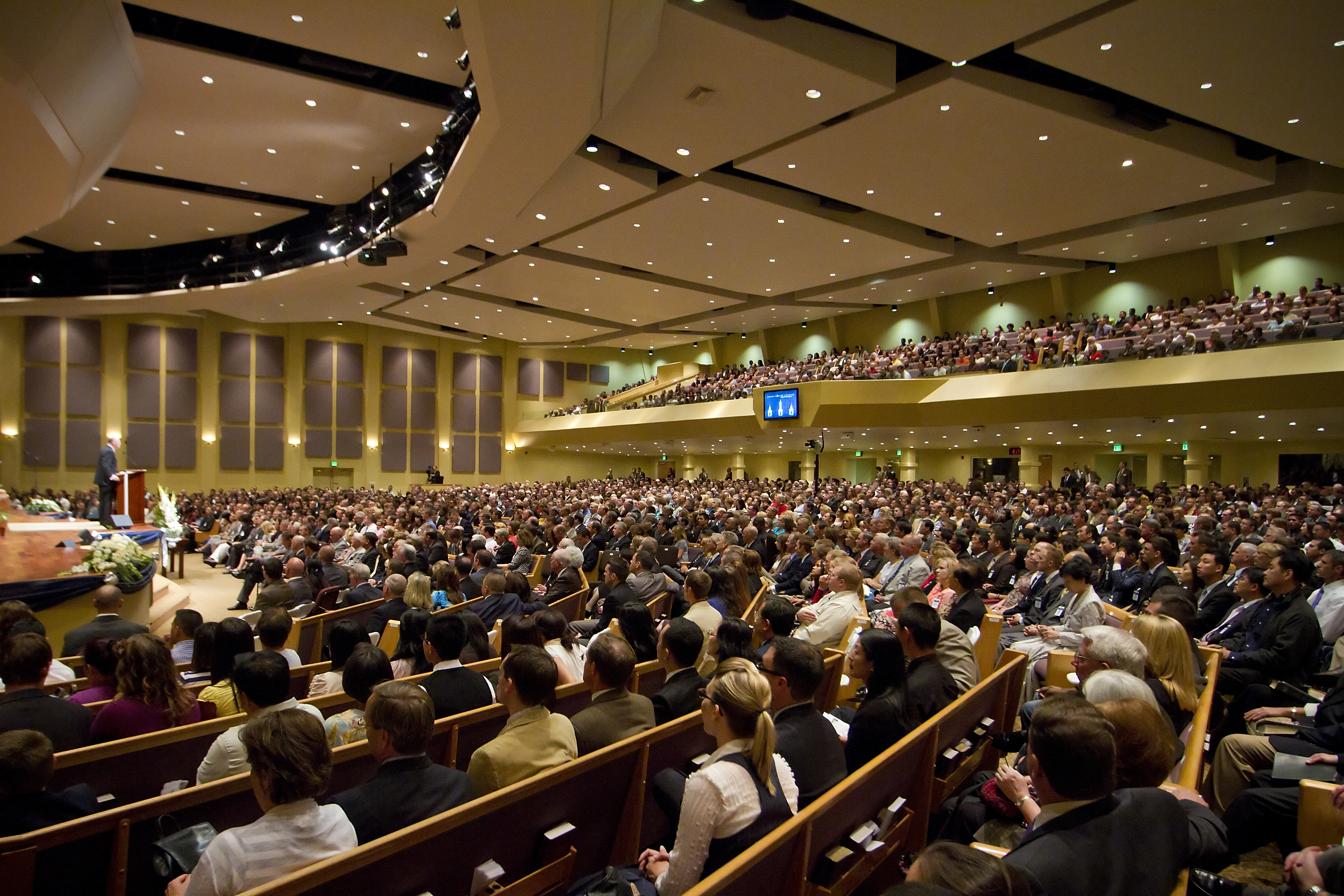
a service at Lancaster Baptist Church in July 2011

In March 2009, Mayor Rex Parris (Lancaster, California) awarded Chappell the City's Citizen of the Year award for 2008.

Chappell serves as the president of West Coast Baptist College, a ministry of Lancaster Baptist Church. The college offers undergraduate and graduate degrees for individuals seeking a vocation in full-time Christian ministry. The college opened in 1995 and remained unaccredited until it gained a membership in the Transnational Association of Christian Colleges and Schools (TRACS), having been approved for Accredited Status on April 18, 2019.

Chappell’s Daily in the Word radio broadcast airs five days a week on over one hundred stations across America and in some other countries. The program began in 1989 as The Sunday Morning Gospel Hour on a local station every Sunday morning. In 1992, the program became a daily ministry on a local Christian station and took the name Truth for Today. In 2005, the name was changed to Daily in the Word and was coupled with a daily devotional website.

Chappell has spoken at Bible conferences throughout the United States and around the world. He is a Fox News opinion contributor. He has been a guest on Todd Starnes syndicated talk radio show on Fox News Radio. In light of the COVID-19 Pandemic, Chappell alongside the city of Lancaster, California, and Franklin Graham worked with the charitable organization Samaritan's Purse to establish emergency field hospitals to treat COVID patients.

== Publications ==
Chappell has authored books on Christian living and biblical ministry philosophy as well as Sunday school curriculum and minibooks on contemporary issues. In 1999, he began a publications ministry that produces materials to equip Christians and local churches with resources for ministry.

== Personal life ==
Chappell and his wife Terrie were married in 1980. They have two daughters and two sons. All four of their children serve in full time ministry with their spouses.

== Selected works ==
- In Desert Places: What Happens When Unlikely People in Unlikely Places Encounter the Presence of God. Striving Together Publications. 2011. ISBN 978-1598941616
- Sacred Motives: 10 Reasons To Wake Up Tomorrow and Live for God. Striving Together Publications. 2012. ISBN 978-1-598941999
- Stewarding Life: One Lifetime, Limited Resources, Eternal Priorities. Striving Together Publications. 2012. ISBN 978-1598941937
- A Word to the Wise: Practical Advice from the Book of Proverbs. Striving Together Publications. 2013. ISBN 978-1598942484
- Paid in Full: Your Debt, God's Payment. Striving Together Publications. 2014. ISBN 978-1598942781
- Out of Commission: Getting Every Christian Back to the Great Commission. Striving Together Publications. 2014. ISBN 978-1598942552
- Continue: A Biblical Journey in Personal Discipleship. Striving Together Publications. 2015. ISBN 978-1598942842
- Trust and Obey: 365 Devotions to Encourage Your Walk of Faith. Striving Together Publications. 2018. ISBN 978-1598943801
- Outsiders. Striving Together Publications. 2019. ISBN 978-1598944013
