= Bible College National Invitational Tournament =

The Bible College National Invitational Tournament is an annual tournament for Christian college basketball teams that compete in the USCAA, NCCAA, and NAIA associations. It is hosted by the schools participating, and is often a three-day, six-to-eight team competition.

== History and format ==
The Bible College National Invitational Tournament was founded in the 2005–06 season by former Trinity Baptist College coach Patrick Milligan, who stepped down in the 2024–25 season. It was formerly known as the Small Bible College National Invitational Tournament, designed to give bible colleges with enrollment under 1,000 students a chance to play for a national championship.

The format has remained largely the same since its origin, with a small group of teams competing in a three-day, knockout tournament, with one team eventually being crowned the winner. The tournament is hosted by a rotation of participating bible colleges. A trademark of the first night of the tournament is a 3-point and dunk contest which provides players a chance to showcase their skills.

== Winners ==
Men's Competition
Year	Winner	Runner-up	Score	Host
2006	Trinity Baptist College			
2007	Word of Life Bible Institute			
2008	Not held			
2009	Trinity Baptist College			
2010	Washington Bible College			
2011	Davis College			
2012	Trinity Baptist College			
2013	Davis College	Trinity Baptist College	74–63	
2014	Trinity Baptist College	Mid-Atlantic Christian University	76–61	
2015	Davis College	Trinity College of Florida	99–82	
2016	Trinity College of Florida	Trinity Baptist College	94–61	
2017	Trinity College of Florida	Trinity Baptist College	63–47	
2018	Mid Atlantic Christian University	Trinity Baptist College	75–54	
2019	Davis College	Trinity Baptist College	68–63	
2020	Trinity College of Florida	Blue Lights College	84–76	
2021	Southeastern Bible College	Toccoa Falls College	66–65	
2022	Word of Life Bible Institute	Appalachian Bible College	97–88	Word of Life Bible Institute
2023	Trinity Baptist College	Trinity College of Florida	86–56	Appalachian Bible College
2024	Trinity College of Florida	Lancaster Bible JV	94–91^{(OT)}	Patrick Henry College
2025	Word of Life Bible Institute	The Crown College	95-65	The Crown College
2026	Patrick Henry College	Word of Life Bible Institute	101-92	Dayspring Bible College
