= Bethesda University =

Private Christian university in Anaheim, California, United States

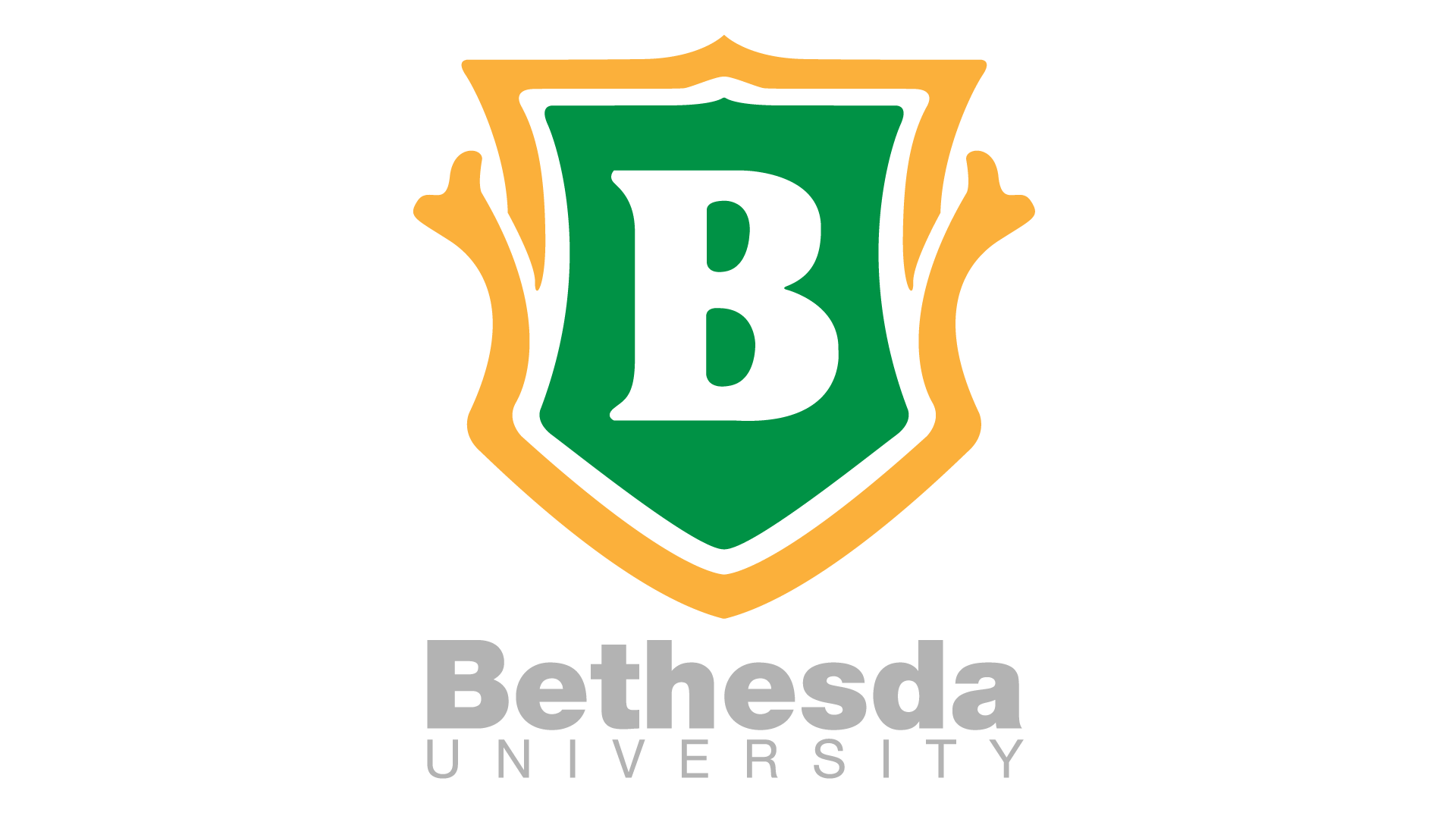
- Motto: Gateway to the World
- Type: Private
- Established: 1976; 50 years ago
- Religious affiliation: Christian
- Academic affiliations: TRACS – ABHE
- President: Seung Je Cho
- Students: 399
- Location: Anaheim, California, U.S. 33°50′32″N 117°56′29″W
- Nickname: Lion Angels
- Sporting affiliations: NCCAA Division I – West
- Website: www.buc.edu

Bethesda University is a private Christian university in Anaheim, California, United States. It was founded in 1976 by David Yonggi Cho. The university is accredited by the Association for Biblical Higher Education and the Transnational Association of Christian Colleges and Schools and it is approved by the Bureau for Private Postsecondary Education of the State of California.

== Athletics ==
Bethesda University is a member of the National Christian College Athletic Association (NCCAA). Their men's basketball team was a member of the now defunct Pacific Christian Athletic Conference (PCAC). They currently have five intercollegiate sports teams made up of men and women's soccer, men and women's basketball, and baseball. The Lion Angels, as they are known, have enjoyed some success in athletics in the past few years. Both women's basketball and baseball have reached the NCCAA's national tournament championship game in 2015 and 2016. Men's soccer has also made national tournament appearances in 2015 and 2016.

However, the most prominent accomplishment for their athletics program comes from the men's basketball team. In 2016 and 2021, BU men's basketball became only the second non-NCAA/NAIA program in history to upset an NCAA Division I program twice when it defeated Cal State Northridge of the Big West Conference on two occasions.
