= Markus Carr =

American basketball player

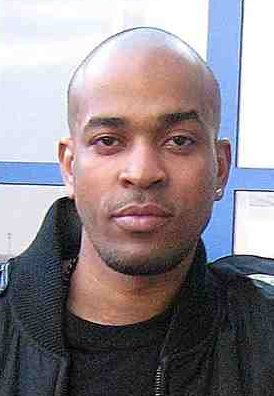

Personal information
- Born: July 20, 1979 (age 47) Los Angeles, California, U.S.
- Listed height: 6 ft 1 in (1.85 m)
- Listed weight: 185 lb (84 kg)

Career information
- High school: Palmdale (Palmdale, California)
- College: Cal State Northridge (1998–2002)
- NBA draft: 2002: undrafted
- Playing career: 2003–present
- Position: Point guard

Career history
- 2003–2006: Guaiqueríes de Margarita
- 2006–2007: Soproni Aszok
- 2007–2008: Reims CAUFA
- 2008–2009: Górnik Wałbrzych
- 2010–2012: BC Vienna

Career highlights
- NCAA assists leader (2001); First-team All-Big West (2002); 2× First-team All-Big Sky (2000, 2001)

Markus Carr (born in Los Angeles, California), also known as M. Carr, is an American basketball player who played in several European countries and South America (France, Venezuela, Poland, Bosnia, and Hungary). Most recently, Carr has played three seasons for the BC Vienna in Liga.1 Austria (2009–2012). In the season 2014/15 he played for the "Raiders Villach" Liga.2. Carinthia, both of the Austrian Basketball Bundesliga.

== College / Professional basketball career ==
Carr had a college basketball career where he averaged 16.0 points per game his senior year at Cal State Northridge in 2002. In his third season at Cal State Northridge, Carr led the Big Sky Conference as well as the Nation in Assist with 8.9 assist per game. Carr is the Cal State Northridge all-time leader in Assist and Steals in the history of the program.

=== Achievements ===
- 2014 Cal State Northridge University Athletic "Hall of Fame" Inductee
- 2012 Austrian All Star Basketball Team Selection

1998 – 2002

- NCAA: Led the Big Sky Conference and the entire Nation in "Assist" with 8.9 assist per game.
- Set Big West record in Steals with 11 steals in a single game
- Set new CSUN Basketball record for most consecutive Free-Throws made with 32 in a row
- CSUN Men's Basketball All-Time leader Assist & Steals
- Three time All League Selection from (Big Sky & Big West 1999–2002)
