= Bobby Braswell =

American college basketball coach

Current position
- Title: Assistant coach
- Team: Long Beach State
- Conference: Big West

Biographical details
- Born: October 5, 1962 (age 64)
- Education: CSU Northridge (1985)

Coaching career (HC unless noted)
- 1985–1989: Cleveland HS
- 1989–1992: Long Beach State (assistant)
- 1992–1996: Oregon (assistant)
- 1996–2013: Cal State Northridge
- 2016–2018: UTEP (assistant)
- 2018–present: Long Beach State (assistant)

Administrative career (AD unless noted)
- 2013–2016: UTEP (dir. of ops.)

Head coaching record
- Overall: 251–258

Accomplishments and honors

Championships
- Big Sky regular season (2001); Big Sky tournament (2001); 2 Big West regular season (2008, 2009); Big West tournament (2009)

Awards
- Big Sky Coach of the Year (2001)

Bobby Frederick Braswell (born October 5, 1962) is an American college basketball coach. He is an assistant coach for the men's basketball program at California State University, Long Beach. Braswell previously served as the men's head coach for his alma mater Cal State Northridge, being named the fourth head coach in Northridge's history on April 30, 1996, succeeding the retired Pete Cassidy.

== Coaching career ==
After graduating from Cal State Northridge in 1985 (with a bachelor's degree in English), Braswell became a teacher and head basketball coach at Cleveland High School in Reseda, Los Angeles. During his four years there, Cleveland won two league titles, and reached the Los Angeles City Section title game in 1986 and 1987. Former NBA player Lucious Harris was a member of Braswell's teams at Cleveland.

Braswell's success on the high school level elevated him to a position as assistant coach at Long Beach State. He served there for three years, first under Joe Harrington and then Seth Greenberg. In this period, Long Beach reached the National Invitation Tournament twice. The 49ers would reach the NCAA tournament the season after Braswell's departure, led by Harris and Bryon Russell, players he had recruited.

Braswell's work at Long Beach State led to him being hired as the top assistant to Jerry Green at the University of Oregon. He would also handle the duties of the Ducks' recruiting coordinator during his four seasons in Eugene. With Braswell on the staff, Oregon would reach the NCAA tournament for the first time in 34 years in 1995. His final recruiting class at Oregon was ranked 35th in the nation.

In 1996, Braswell made his return to his alma mater, Cal State Northridge, as their new head coach. He had immediate success in the 1996–97 season. The Matadors' 14–15 record was their best record since moving to Division I in 1990. Despite a sixth-place finish, Braswell's team made a run to the finals of the Big Sky Conference tournament. They would narrowly miss out on an NCAA berth, suffering an 82–79 defeat to Montana in the championship game.

The following season, CSUN again finished near the bottom of the Big Sky conference, but performed well in the tournament, upsetting Eastern Washington in the quarterfinals before losing to host and eventual champion Northern Arizona the next day.

Braswell continued to build the Northridge program over the next several years. In 1998–99, the team went 17–12. The next year, the record improved to 20–10, and Braswell's team again made a run to the Big Sky championship game, losing in overtime to Northern Arizona.

Braswell would finally break through in the 2000–01 season. Led by six seniors, Northridge would upset UCLA at Pauley Pavilion, finish atop the Big Sky standings, and win the Big Sky tournament at home to reach the NCAA tournament. They would lose to Kansas in the first round to finish 22–10, Braswell's best season to date. He became a sought-after coaching commodity following the season, but instead signed a six-year extension to stay in Northridge. UCLA did not play Northridge again until the 2008–09 season after the Matadors' win at Pauley.

After 2001, Northridge moved to the Big West Conference. In the 2004 Big West tournament, his team made an improbable run to finals, winning three games in three nights. They narrowly lost to Pacific, after coming back from a 19-point deficit to tie the game. Braswell has had three winning seasons since joining the Big West, finishing 18–13 in 2004–05, 20–10 in 2007–08 and a tie for first place in the conference and 17–13 in 2008–09 and winning the conference and automatic berth to the NCAA Division I tournament. On March 14, 2009 the Matadors beat University of Pacific in the Big West tournament Championship game to make their second appearance in the NCAA Division I tournament.

The Matador men's basketball team, faced with adversity both on-and-off the court in 2008–09, played like champions. In one of the most dramatic, high-energized games in school history, Cal State Northridge recorded a 71–66 overtime victory over Pacific in the title game of the Big West Conference tournament on at the Anaheim Convention Center. The Matadors defeated a Tiger team that has given them persistent headaches. In 21 previous meetings, Pacific had won 17 games, including two games earlier in the year. Despite the fact the Matadors raced to what seemed to be an insurmountable 21–3 lead in the first half, the Tigers gradually sliced the Matador lead and tied the game at 42–42 with 11:01 left in the game. Pacific fought back to within one point, 54–53, with 3:04 to play. However, Cal State Northridge refused to let Pacific take the lead. Cal State Northridge took a 61–56 lead with 1:19 remaining. It seemed like victory was just seconds away. Again, three straight points by Pacific cut the Matador lead to two points, 61–59, with 60 seconds to play in regulation. Then with five seconds to play, UOP's Michael Kirby was fouled and hit two free throws to send the game into overtime at 61–61. In the overtime, the Matadors took charge with a three-pointer by Rodrigue Mels to give the Matadors a 64–61 lead with 4:44 remaining. A lay-up and a free throw by Pacific's Bryan LeDuc tied the game. But a jumper by Rob Haynes, another three-pointer by Mels and two free throws by Mark Hill down the stretch gave the Matadors the win, the Big West Conference Championship, and the school's second berth in the NCAA Tournament.

Following the victory, fans celebrated on the court, and the team participated in the traditional post-game cutting down of the nets before attending the post-game press conference. Braswell concluded his coaching tenure at Cal State Northridge with an overall record of 251–258.

In March 2007, Braswell signed a two-year contract extension that kept him in Northridge through the 2008–09 season.

In 2004, Braswell was reprimanded by the university for a failure to provide oversight to an assistant coach who had violated NCAA rules. As a result, the Northridge program was placed on a three-year probation period by the NCAA, ending after the 2005–06 season.

Braswell also has a reputation as being a tough coach. This has led to a high level of attrition amongst his players. During the 2002–03 season and the immediate aftermath, three underclassmen transferred out of the program to continue their careers elsewhere. In 2003–04, two players were suspended and another kicked off the team for undisclosed violations. At the end of that season, four more players would transfer out. In 2006–07, one player quit the team in the middle of the season, and several more left the team afterward. The 2007 senior class marked the first time since 2001 that the Braswell has had three players who were with the program for a full four seasons.

Braswell was relieved of his duties on March 19, 2013 after 17 seasons as head coach.

In 2013, Braswell was hired by University of Texas at El Paso to serve as the director of basketball operations. In 2016, he was promoted to assistant coach with the Miners.

In 2018, Braswell returned to Long Beach State as assistant coach.

== Personal ==
Braswell and his wife, Penny, have three sons. The eldest child, then 22-year-old son, Jeffery Robert Braswell, along with Phannuel Gbewonyo, senior Matadors guard Deon Tresvant, and freshman Matadors guard Dallas Rutherford, was charged on January 7, 2009 with commercial burglary and grand theft. The four allegedly stole more than $6,600 in merchandise from a Best Buy store on January 1. The younger Braswell worked at a suburban Los Angeles Best Buy in Porter Ranch, and allegedly accessed the cash register using a stolen password from an absent employee. The thefts were discovered when store officials discovered a discrepancy at the register. Jeffery Braswell was charged with one felony count of second-degree commercial burglary and three felony counts of grand theft over $400, and he was released on his own recognizance to be arraigned on January 26. Jeffery was convicted of a misdemeanor after pleading no contest and he received a sentence of three years' formal probation and 300 hours of work with the California Department of Transportation.

== Head coaching record ==
Record table
Season	Team	Overall	Conference	Standing	Postseason
Cal State Northridge Matadors (Big Sky Conference) (1996–2001)
1996–97	Cal State Northridge	14–15	6–8	6th	
1997–98	Cal State Northridge	12–16	6–8	6th	
1998–99	Cal State Northridge	17–12	9–7	T–3rd	
1999–2000	Cal State Northridge	20–10	10–6	T–4th	
2000–01	Cal State Northridge	22–10	13–3	1st	NCAA Division I First Round
Cal State Northridge Matadors (Big West Conference) (2001–2013)
2001–02	Cal State Northridge	12–16	11–7	T–3rd	
2002–03	Cal State Northridge	14–15	8–10	T–6th	
2003–04	Cal State Northridge	14–16	7–11	T–5th	
2004–05	Cal State Northridge	18–13	12–6	T–3rd	
2005–06	Cal State Northridge	11–17	4–10	7th	
2006–07	Cal State Northridge	14–17	5–9	T–6th	
2007–08	Cal State Northridge	20–10	12–4	T–1st	
2008–09	Cal State Northridge	17–14	11–5	1st	NCAA Division I First Round
2009–10	Cal State Northridge	11–21	6–10	T–7th	
2010–11	Cal State Northridge	14–18	9–7	3rd	
2011–12	Cal State Northridge	7–21	3–13	T–8th	
2012–13	Cal State Northridge	14–17	5–13	9th	
Cal State Northridge:		251–258 (.493)	137–137 (.500)		
Total:		251–258 (.493)			
National champion Postseason invitational champion Conference regular season champion Conference regular season and conference tournament champion Division regular season champion Division regular season and conference tournament champion Conference tournament champion
