= Leo Balayon III =

Filipino Men's College Basketball Coach and Athletic Director in the United States

Leopoldo Balayon III is a Filipino college basketball coach and athletic director in the United States. After a brief hiatus, Balayon recently returned to Bethesda University and resumed his tenure as director of athletics while taking a break from coaching men's basketball. Prior to this Balayon founded the athletics program at Stanton University in Garden Grove, California. He also briefly served as athletic director and head men's basketball coach there. During his first tenure at Bethesda University, Balayon served as the director of athletics and men's basketball coach. Balayon is the first individual, born and raised, in the Philippines to become a college head men's basketball coach in the United States. He is also the only head men's basketball coach in college basketball history to lead a non-NCAA/NAIA program to two upset victories against an NCAA Division I opponent.

== Career ==
Balayon began his coaching career in 2003 as an assistant coach for the University of the Philippines of the University Athletic Association of the Philippines or UAAP. In 2009, Balayon became an assistant coach for the defunct Pacifica College of Moreno Valley, California. After two seasons at Pacifica, Balayon moved on to become an assistant coach with Caltech, a Division III program in Pasadena, California. Balayon also briefly served as an assistant coach for the Afghanistan men's basketball national team. In 2013, Balayon joined Bethesda University's athletic program and served as associate head coach for both the men and women's basketball teams. He was eventually promoted to head men's basketball coach in 2015.

While at Bethesda University, Balayon became the only head coach in college basketball history to lead a non-NCAA/NAIA program to a victory against an NCAA Division I opponent twice. Both historic upsets came at the expense of Cal State Northridge of the Big West Conference.
