= Rodrigue Mels =

French basketball player

Rodrigue Mels; (born April 15, 1985, in Les Abymes, Guadeloupe) is a French professional basketball player. He is 1.90 m (6 ft 3 in) tall and plays at both the shooting guard and point guard positions. Throughout his career, he has played for French clubs SLUC Nancy, Châlons-Reims and BC Orchies, as well as AEK Athens in Greece. He previously played college basketball at California State University, Northridge.
