= Pete Cassidy (basketball) =

American college basketball coach (1934–2020)

Biographical details
- Born: June 20, 1934
- Died: December 18, 2020 (aged 86); Valencia, California, U.S.

Playing career
- 1958–1960: San Fernando Valley State

Coaching career (HC unless noted)
- 1966–1971: Cal State Northridge (assistant)
- 1971–1996: Cal State Northridge

Head coaching record
- Overall: 334–337

Accomplishments and honors

Championships
- 4 CCAA regular season (1972, 1978, 1979, 1985)

Awards
- 2× CCAA Coach of the Year (1978, 1985)

Pete Cassidy (June 20, 1934 – December 18, 2020) was an American college basketball coach who served as head coach of the Cal State Northridge Matadors from 1971 to 1996.

Cassidy played basketball and baseball at San Fernando Valley State (now California State University, Northridge), graduating in 1960. After stints coaching California high school teams, Cassidy returned to his alma mater as an assistant under Jerry Ball. He was promoted to head coach upon Ball's departure in 1971 and spent the next 25 years as the school's head coach, compiling a record of 334–337. Cassidy was the coach as the Matadors transitioned to NCAA Division I status in 1990. He was fired following the 1995–96 season.

Cassidy died on December 18, 2020, at age 86.
