= Lamine Diane =

Senegalese basketball player (born 1997)

Free agent
- Position: Power forward / small forward

Personal information
- Born: November 7, 1997 (age 28) Dakar, Senegal
- Listed height: 6 ft 7 in (2.01 m)
- Listed weight: 205 lb (93 kg)

Career information
- High school: Findlay Prep (Henderson, Nevada)
- College: Cal State Northridge (2018–2020)
- NBA draft: 2020: undrafted
- Playing career: 2021–present

Career history
- 2021–2022: Delaware Blue Coats

Career highlights
- 2× Big West Player of the Year (2019, 2020); 2× First-team All-Big West (2019, 2020); Big West Freshman of the Year (2019); Big West Newcomer of the Year (2019)
- Stats at NBA.com
- Stats at Basketball Reference

Lamine Diane (born November 7, 1997) is a Senegalese professional basketball player who plays for the Cape Town Tigers. He played college basketball for the Cal State Northridge Matadors. He was named the Big West Player of the Year in both 2019 and 2020.

== High school and college career ==
Diane, the son of Senegal national team player Keletigui Diane, first began playing basketball at the age of nine, though he was initially more interested in soccer. He came to the United States in 2015 to play high school basketball at Findlay Prep in Henderson, Nevada. He came into his own in his second season as he tripled his scoring average from 5 to 16 points per game. He committed to Cal State Northridge, redshirting the 2017–18 season to concentrate on academics and to allow a wrist injury to heal. As a redshirt freshman, Diane averaged 24.8 points, 11.2 rebounds and 2.2 blocked shots per game and led the nation in field goals. At the close of the season became the first player in history to win the Big West Conference's Player, Freshman and Newcomer of the Year awards in the same year.

For his sophomore season, Diane was named to the preseason All-Big West team. However, he was ruled academically ineligible for the first semester by the NCAA. At the close of the regular season, Diane was awarded his second straight conference Player of the Year honor. He averaged 25.6 points, 10.2 rebounds, two blocks and 1.7 steals per game. Following the season Diane declared for the 2020 NBA draft.

== Professional career ==
=== Delaware Blue Coats (2021–2022) ===
On December 3, 2020, Diane signed with the Philadelphia 76ers. On December 7, he was waived by the 76ers. He was then added to the roster of the 76ers' NBA G League affiliate, the Delaware Blue Coats, making his debut on February 11, 2021, and scoring three points, blocking two shots and pulling down two rebounds. On October 25, he re-signed with Delaware. On February 3, 2022, Diane was ruled out for the season with a shoulder injury.

=== Cape Town Tigers (2023-present) ===
In October 2023, the Cape Town Tigers from South Africa announced they had signed Diane on their social media. He was, however, not on the roster of the Tigers for the 2024 BAL qualification tournament.

== Career statistics ==
Legend
GP	Games played	GS	Games started	MPG	Minutes per game
FG%	Field goal percentage	3P%	3-point field goal percentage	FT%	Free throw percentage
RPG	Rebounds per game	APG	Assists per game	SPG	Steals per game
BPG	Blocks per game	PPG	Points per game	**Bold**	Career high

=== College ===
Year	Team	GP	GS	MPG	FG%	3P%	FT%	RPG	APG	SPG	BPG	PPG
2018–19	Cal State Northridge	**33**	**33**	35.3	**.485**	**.304**	.522	**11.2**	2.1	1.5	**2.2**	24.8
2019–20	Cal State Northridge	19	19	**35.9**	.480	.286	**.663**	10.2	**2.8**	**1.7**	2.0	**25.6**
Career		52	52	35.5	.483	.291	.580	10.8	2.3	1.6	2.1	25.1
