= Paul McCracken (basketball) =

American basketball player

Personal information
- Born: September 11, 1950 (age 76) New York City, New York, U.S.
- Listed height: 6 ft 4 in (1.93 m)
- Listed weight: 180 lb (82 kg)

Career information
- High school: Hillhouse (New Haven, Connecticut)
- College: Los Angeles CC (1968–1970); Cal State Northridge (1970–1972)
- NBA draft: 1972: undrafted
- Playing career: 1972–1980
- Position: Shooting guard
- Number: 4, 7

Career history
- 1972–1973: Houston Rockets
- 1973–1974: Hazleton Bullets
- 1974–1975: Allentown Jets
- 1976: Chicago Bulls
- 1977–1978: Wilkes-Barre Barons
- 1978–1979: Maccabi Tel Aviv
- 1979–1980: Hawaii Volcanos
- 1980: Galleon Shippers

Career highlights
- EBA Most Valuable Player (1978); All-EBA First Team (1978)
- Stats at NBA.com
- Stats at Basketball Reference

Paul George McCracken (born September 11, 1950) is an American former professional basketball player. He was 6 feet 4 inches (193 cm) and 180 pounds (82 kg); he played guard.

== Early life ==
McCracken was born in New York, New York. He attended high school at Hillhouse High School in New Haven, Connecticut.

== College career ==
For college, McCracken went to California State University, Northridge. He set the school single-season record for rebounds, with 330, in 1970–71. A two-time All-American, two-time All-California Collegiate Athletic Association selection, and 1972 CCAA MVP, he was inducted into the college's Matador Hall of Fame in 1993.

== Professional career ==
He made his NBA debut on February 6, 1973, becoming the first player from Northridge to play in the NBA. McCracken played for the Houston Rockets from 1972 to 1974, and the Chicago Bulls from 1976 to 1977.

McCracken played several years in the Eastern Basketball Association (EBA) / Continental Basketball Association (CBA) for the Hazleton Bullets, Allentown Jets, Wilkes-Barre Barons and Hawaii Volcanos. For his four-year career, he averaged 19.1 points and 5.6 rebounds per game. His best season was 1977–78, where he averaged 31.6 points per game for Wilkes-Barre and was named EBA Most Valuable Player.

McCracken played for the Israeli team Maccabi Tel Aviv in 1978–79.

== Career statistics ==
Legend
GP	Games played	GS	Games started	MPG	Minutes per game
FG%	Field goal percentage	3P%	3-point field goal percentage	FT%	Free throw percentage
RPG	Rebounds per game	APG	Assists per game	SPG	Steals per game
BPG	Blocks per game	PPG	Points per game	**Bold**	Career high

=== NBA ===
==== Regular season ====
Year	Team	GP	GS	MPG	FG%	FT%	RPG	APG	SPG	BPG	PPG
1972–73	Houston	**24**		12.7	**.494**	.590	**2.1**	.7			4.6
1973–74	Houston	4		3.3	.250	–	1.5	.5	.0	.0	.5
1976–77	Chicago	9	0	**13.2**	.383	**.611**	1.8	**1.6**	**.7**	.0	**5.2**
Career		37	0	11.8	.450	.596	2.0	.9	.5	.0	4.3
