= Andy Newman (basketball) =

American basketball coach

Current position
- Title: Head coach
- Team: Cal State Northridge
- Conference: Big West
- Record: 62–42 (.596)

Biographical details
- Born: April 14, 1975 (age 51); Roseburg, Oregon, U.S.

Playing career
- 1995–1996: West Valley JC
- 1996–1997: Southern Utah
- 1997–1998: Azusa Pacific
- Positions: Shooting guard, point guard

Coaching career (HC unless noted)
- 1999–2000: Vanguard (assistant)
- 2000–2002: West Valley JC (assistant)
- 2003–2007: Cal State Fullerton (assistant)
- 2007–2012: Cal State Fullerton (associate HC)
- 2012–2013: Cal State Fullerton (interim HC)
- 2013–2018: UT Permian Basin
- 2018–2023: Cal State San Bernardino
- 2023–present: Cal State Northridge

Administrative career (AD unless noted)
- 2002–2003: Fresno State (basketball ops.)

Head coaching record
- Overall: 268–140 (.657)
- Tournaments: 8–4 (.667) (NCAA Division II)

Accomplishments and honors

Championships
- 2 CCAA regular season (2022, 2023); CCAA tournament (2023); Lone Star Conference regular season (2017); Lone Star tournament (2017)

Awards
- 2× CCAA Coach of the Year (2022, 2023); Lone Star Coach of the Year (2017)

Andrew Newman (born April 14, 1975) is an American basketball coach who is currently the head coach of the Cal State Northridge Matadors men's basketball team. He is the younger brother of Eric Newman.

== Playing career ==
Newman played college basketball at three institutions. He started at West Valley College before transferring to Southern Utah where he appeared in 26 games. He'd complete his college playing career at Azusa Pacific where he was part of the Cougars' NAIA Final Four team.

== Coaching career ==
Newman's coaching career began with assistant coaching stops at Vanguard University, West Valley, and an administrative role at Fresno State before he joined Bob Burton's staff at Cal State Fullerton. After Burton was fired in 2012, Newman was named the interim coach for the 2012–13 season. In his lone season with the Titans, Newman compiled a 14–18 overall record.

In 2013, Newman would become the head coach at NCAA Division II institution UT Permian Basin where in five seasons he put together a 101–50 overall record including a Lone Star Conference regular season and tournament title, as well as two NCAA tournament appearances, culminating in a Sweet 16 bid in 2018.

Newman returned to California in 2018 when he accepted the head coaching position at Cal State San Bernardino. While with the Coyotes, Newman totaled a 91–30 overall record, including two California Collegiate Athletic Association conference tournament titles along with a regular season title, and guided the team to a Division II Final Four appearance in 2023.

On April 15, 2023, Newman was named the head coach at Cal State Northridge, replacing Trent Johnson.

== Head coaching record ==
=== NCAA DI ===
Record table
Season	Team	Overall	Conference	Standing	Postseason
Cal State Fullerton Titans (Big West Conference) (2012–2013)
2012–13	Cal State Fullerton	14–18	6–12	8th	
Cal State Fullerton:		14–18 (.438)	6–12 (.333)		
Cal State Northridge Matadors (Big West Conference) (2023–present)
2023–24	Cal State Northridge	19–15	9–11	T–7th	
2024–25	Cal State Northridge	22–11	14–6	T–3rd	NIT First Round
2025–26	Cal State Northridge	20–14	12–8	T–3rd	
2026–27	Cal State Northridge	1–2	0–0		
Cal State Northridge:		62–42 (.596)	35–25 (.583)		
Total:		76–60 (.559)			
National champion Postseason invitational champion Conference regular season champion Conference regular season and conference tournament champion Division regular season champion Division regular season and conference tournament champion Conference tournament champion

=== NCAA DII ===
Record table
Season	Team	Overall	Conference	Standing	Postseason
UT Permian Basin Falcons (Heartland Conference) (2013–2016)
2013–14	UT Permian Basin	17–11	10–8	6th	
2014–15	UT Permian Basin	17–12	12–8	T–5th	
2015–16	UT Permian Basin	15–14	10–10	T–7th	
UT Permian Basin Falcons (Lone Star Conference) (2016–2018)
2016–17	UT Permian Basin	26–6	14–4	1st	NCAA Division II Round of 64
2017–18	UT Permian Basin	26–7	14–4	2nd	NCAA Division II Sweet 16
UT Permian Basin:		101–50 (.669)	60–24 (.714)		
Cal State San Bernardino Coyotes (CCAA) (2018–2023)
2018–19	Cal State San Bernardino	15–14	11–11	T–7th	
2019–20	Cal State San Bernardino	21–8	16–6	4th	
2021–22	Cal State San Bernardino	24–4	16–2	1st	NCAA Division II Round of 32
2022–23	Cal State San Bernardino	31–4	20–2	1st	NCAA Division II Final Four
Cal State San Bernardino:		91–30 (.752)	63–21 (.750)		
Total:		192–80 (.706)			
National champion Postseason invitational champion Conference regular season champion Conference regular season and conference tournament champion Division regular season champion Division regular season and conference tournament champion Conference tournament champion
