= West Coast Baptist College =

IFB (Independent Fundamental Baptist) Bible college in Lancaster, California

Coordinates: 34.695297°N 118.057552°W

- Motto: Training Laborers for His Harvest
- Type: Private
- Established: 1995; 31 years ago
- Accreditation: TRACS
- Affiliations: Independent Baptist
- President: Dr. Paul Chappell
- Vice-president: Dr. Mark Rasmussen
- Executive Vice President: Dr. John Goetsch
- Location: Lancaster, California, USA
- Campus: 80 acres
- Colors: Cardinal Red and White
- Sporting affiliations: NCCAA
- Mascot: Eagle
- Website: wcbc.edu

West Coast Baptist College is an independent Baptist Bible college in Lancaster, California, offering graduate and undergraduate degrees. West Coast opened in 1995 and is a member of the Transnational Association of Christian Colleges and Schools (TRACS), having been awarded Candidate Status on October 27, 2015; then approved for Accredited Status on April 18, 2019.

== History ==
In July 1986, Paul Chappell became the pastor of Lancaster Baptist Church in Lancaster, California. In 1988, the church raised an initial $50,000 for the down payment on the first twenty acres of property located on the east side of town. In 1995, Paul Chappell and Lancaster Baptist Church approved the beginning of West Coast Baptist College. West Coast Baptist College started with Paul Chappell, John Goetsch, and Mark Rasmussen.

In December 2014, the administration of West Coast Baptist College announced their intention to apply for national accreditation with Transnational Association of Christian Colleges and Schools. On October 27, 2015, West Coast Baptist College was awarded candidacy status as a Category III institution by the TRACS Accreditation Commission. On April 17, 2019, the institution was awarded accredited status by the TRACS Accreditation Commission, and was affirmed 10 more years of accreditation on October 24, 2023.

== Academics ==
West Coast Baptist College is a conservative IFB Bible college focused on training students for ministry. The school offers:

- Bachelor degree of Religious Education with concentrations in Pastoral Theology, Church Ministry, Evangelism, Missions, Ministry Leadership and Administration, Office Administration, Elementary Education, Secondary Education, Church Music, Music Education, Biblical Counseling, and Visual Arts.
- Master's degree of Religious Education with concentrations in Biblical Studies, Biblical Counseling, and Christian Education

== Campus ==
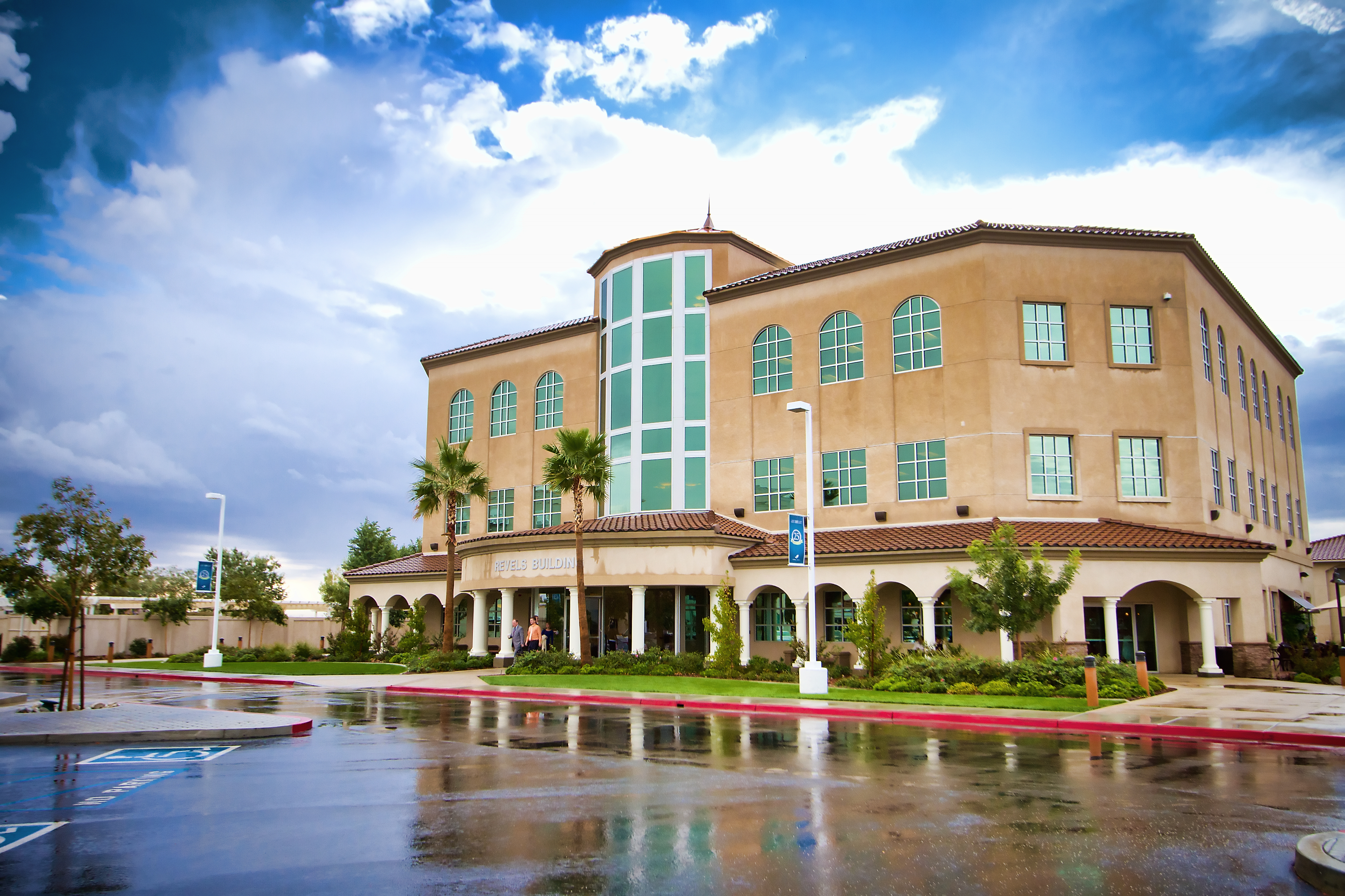
Revels Educational Building

The campus of West Coast Baptist College contains seventeen major buildings extending from Lancaster Boulevard to Avenue J, and are shared by both Lancaster Baptist Church and Lancaster Baptist School.

== Beliefs ==
West Coast is a Baptist Bible college. West Coast Baptist College believes the King James Bible is the only correct English translation of the inspired Word of God. It believes in the trinity, in the deity of Jesus Christ, and in Salvation by grace through faith in Christ alone. West Coast emphasizes the importance of the local church. It believes the Bible is preserved for the English-speaking people in the King James Version. WCBC rejects all other English translations of the Bible.

== Campuses ==
- Main Campus (4010 E Lancaster Blvd. Lancaster, CA)
- Online

== Athletics ==
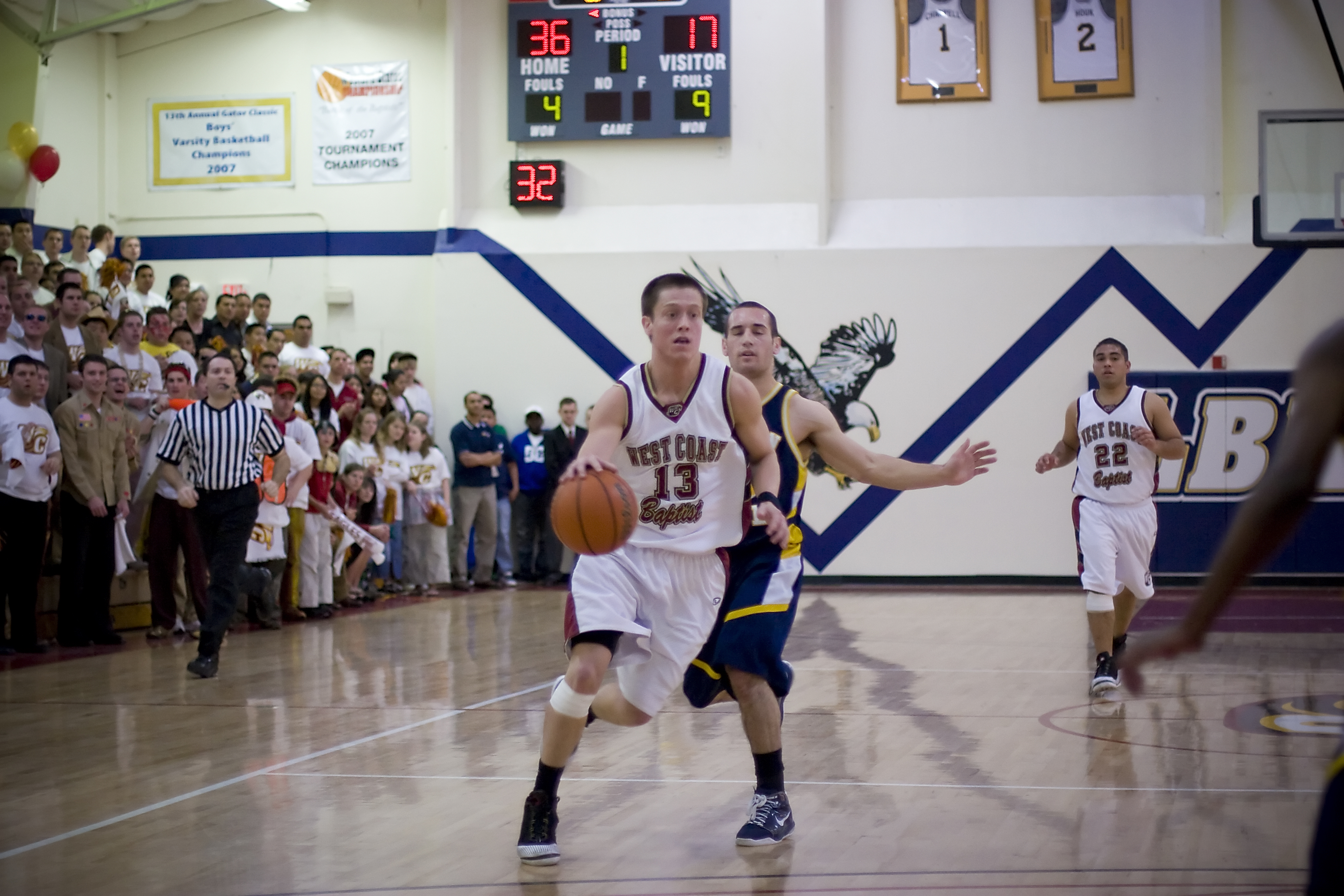
WCBC Men's Basketball

WCBC's athletic teams are nicknamed the Eagles. The college is a member of the National Christian College Athletic Association. The college has intercollegiate men's basketball and women's volleyball

WCBC has a men's basketball program and a ladies volleyball program. They are a member of the National Christian College Athletic Association (NCCAA), Association of Christian College Athletics (ACCA) and Pacific Christian Athletic Conference. In the 2007-08 season, the West Coast Baptist College athletics received notoriety from the local newspaper. They followed their journey winning season to the national finals. In 2011-2012, they won the NCCAA Regionals against Portland Bible. In February 2012, they defeated Korea University 105-101.
