= Cal State Northridge Matadors men's basketball =

Cal State Northridge Matadors
2025–26 Cal State Northridge Matadors men's basketball team
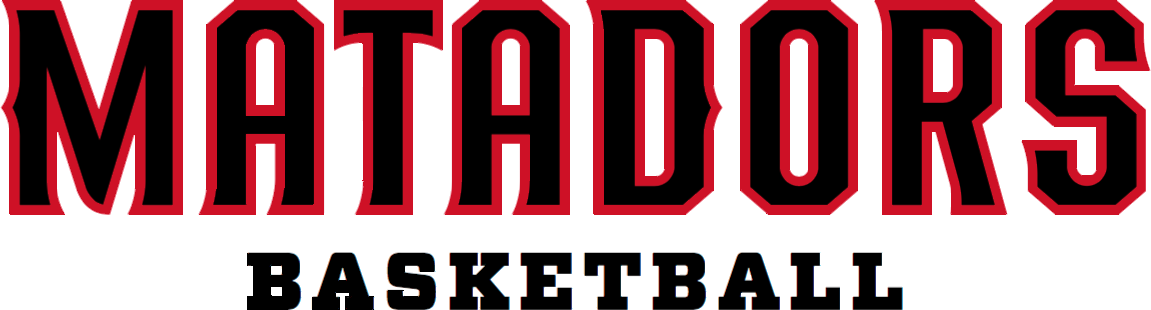
- University: California State University, Northridge
- Head coach: Andy Newman (3rd season)
- Conference: Big West
- Location: Northridge, California
- Arena: Premier America Credit Union Arena (capacity: 2,400)
- Nickname: Matadors
- Colors: Red, white, and black

Uniforms
Home	Away	Alternate

NCAA tournament Sweet Sixteen
- 1978*, 1985*

NCAA tournament appearances
- 1978*, 1979*, 1985*, 2001, 2009 *at Division II level

Conference tournament champions
- 2001 (Big Sky); 2009 (Big West)

Conference regular-season champions
- 1971, 1972, 1978, 1979, 1985 (CCAA); 2001 (Big Sky); 2009 (Big West)

The Cal State Northridge Matadors men's basketball team is the men's college basketball program representing California State University, Northridge. The team currently competes in the Big West Conference of the NCAA's Division I. The Matadors' current head coach is Andy Newman.

== History ==
Until 1972, the school and its teams were known as San Fernando Valley State College. The Matadors played their home games at local high schools until Matador Gymnasium was completed, before the start of the 1962–63 season.

=== Early years ===
San Fernando Valley State College opened in 1958, and fielded a basketball program for the 1958–59 season. The program's first head coach was Paul Thomas.

The first game in SFVSC's history was a 110–45 loss to Chapman College on December 1, 1958. The fledgling team would lose again to Westmont eight days later. They broke through for the first win of the program's history on December 13, a 73–64 triumph over La Verne. They would go on to finish their inaugural season with a record of 3–13.

The Matadors showed some improvement over the next two seasons, and joined the CCAA in 1961. Matador Gymnasium opened on November 30, 1962, with a 69–59 defeat to Pepperdine. Two consecutive last-place finishes in the CCAA resulted in Thomas's dismissal at the end of the 1962–63 season.

From 1959 to 1962, Jim Malkin scored 1301 points for the SFVSC. He would remain the school's all-time leading scorer until 1994.

=== 1960–1971: The Jerry Ball era ===
Thomas's replacement as head coach was Jerry Ball, who had been an assistant under Thomas. Ball showed immediate progress, taking the team to a 9–17 record in 1963–64, a six-game improvement over Thomas's final season. He would guide the Matadors to their first-ever winning season, finishing 18–8 in 1964–65. SFVSU would win their first conference championship under Ball, finishing 7–1 in the CCAA in 1970–71. Ball left the school after this season.

Ball's top player was Jerry Joseph, who played for the Matadors from 1967 to 1970. Joseph ended his collegiate career with 1204 points and 807 rebounds. He is still the all-time leading rebounder in school history.

=== 1971: Success under Cassidy ===
Ball was replaced by Pete Cassidy, an SFVSC assistant coach who was a player during the program's first two seasons. Cassidy would pick up where Ball left off, finishing 16–9 and tied for first in the CCAA. For the next five seasons, Northridge would be mired in mediocrity. However, player Paul McCracken, a high-flying ace later played in the NBA.

In the 1977–78 season, things took off for the Matadors. Led by Division II All-Americans Terry Miller and Larry Singleton, and Chuck Evans the team would finish 22–7 and win the CCAA title. CSUN would make their first postseason appearance, hosting the Division II Western Regional, but losing to San Diego 70–67 in the regional final. This game set the Matadome attendance record of 3,100 fans, which has not been broken and will likely never be broken, as the gym now holds just 1,600 people. During this season, the Matadors also achieved their first national ranking, ending the regular season ranked 7th in the Division II poll.

The following season, Cassidy's squad notched another 20-win season and another CCAA title led by All-American Chuck Evans. Once again, they were eliminated from the NCAA Western Regional by San Diego. Over the next five years, CSUN would have four winning seasons, but not reach the postseason.

That changed in 1984–85, when the Matadors finished 20–10, winning the CCAA and reaching the NCAA West Regional, where they were eliminated by Cal State Hayward.

=== 1990: The move to Division I ===
Cal State Northridge moved its athletics program, including basketball, to Division I starting with the 1990–91 season. The first season ended with a forgettable 8–20 record. In 1994, Andre Chevalier broke Malkin's 32-year-old scoring record, but it was of little help. CSUN originally independent, without a conference, before joining the fledgling American West Conference. The Matadors never won more than 11 games in any of their first six seasons in Division I.

=== 1996–2013: The Braswell era ===
Northridge finally found a solid conference affiliation in 1996, joining the Big Sky Conference. Cassidy was replaced by Bobby Braswell, a Northridge alum who was previously an assistant coach at Oregon. Braswell brought with him an up-tempo, high-pressure style of play that kept the Matadors among the national leaders in steals and turnovers forced during his tenure. The turnaround was immediate, as CSUN went 14–15 and reached the Big Sky tournament championship game, falling just short of an NCAA berth in an 82–79 loss to Montana.

Braswell took the program to even further heights, going 20–10 in the 1999–2000 season, and finally breaking through with a 22–10 season that saw the Matadors win the Big Sky regular season and tournament championships and make their first appearance in the NCAA Division I tournament. This team was led by Honorable Mention All-American Brian Heinle, who is the school's all-time scoring leader with 1641 points, and Markus Carr, who led the nation in assists that year and holds the school record with 767 for his career.

Northridge left the Big Sky to join the Big West Conference in 2001. CSUN reached the Big West Conference men's basketball tournament finals in 2003–04 after shocking 23rd-ranked Utah State in the semifinals. Led by Ian Boylan, who holds CSUN records for three-pointers and steals, they finished 18–13 in 2004–05. In 2008, they tied for first place in the Big West Conference. In 2009, the Matadors were selected as the pre-season favorite to win the Big West. On March 14, 2009 the Matadors beat University of Pacific in the Big West tournament championship game at the Anaheim Convention Center to make it to the 2009 NCAA Division I men's basketball tournament for the second time in the school's history.

As Cal State Northridge celebrated its 50th anniversary, the Matador men's basketball team played well. In one of the most dramatic, high-energized games in school history, Cal State Northridge recorded a 71–66 overtime victory over Pacific in the title game of the Big West Conference tournament. Following the game, several hundred Matador fans stormed the court to congratulate the team. Rodrique Mels, who scored 23 points in the championship game against Pacific, was named tournament MVP. Mels also scored a career-high 28 points the previous night in the semifinals against UC Santa Barbara. Tremaine Townsend, who grabbed a game-high 12 rebounds against the Tigers, was also named to the all-tournament team. Coach Braswell's overall record at CSUN was 205–180, as he was relieved of his duties after the 2012-2013 season and replaced by former UNLV and NBA player, New Mexico, D-Fenders and Sacramento Kings Head Coach, Reggie Theus.

Bobby Braswell was fired as head coach on March 19, 2013. Reggie Theus was hired as head coach on April 1, 2013.

==== 2009 NCAA tournament ====
In the NCAA first round game, the 15th-seeded Matadors were heavy underdogs against No. 2-seeded Memphis. As the Matadors entered the arena from the locker room, (being officially welcomed by the announcer) they were greeted with only a few cheers from their small fanbase. The Memphis Tigers came out early and took over the Matadors entrance. As the game got underway, the Matadors, playing in Kansas City, Missouri at the Sprint Center, hit a three-pointer to start the scoring. The Matadors trailed by only two points at the half. Continuing to surprise, CSUN stuck with Memphis throughout the second half as well. With approximately ten minutes left in the game, the Matadors hit a three pointer that brought the capacity crowd to its feet and gave them a five-point lead. With about three minutes left, the Tigers hit a three pointer that put them up five. As Northridge brought the ball up, the Tigers stole it and made another shot. The Matadors lost by eleven points (81–70).

=== 2013–2018: The Theus era ===
In five seasons as head coach of the Matadors, Reggie Theus posted an overall record of 53–105, finishing under .500 every season at the helm. With a record of 26–54, Theus and Northridge never finished better than fifth overall in Big West Conference play during his tenure. On March 7, 2018, Theus was relieved as head coach alongside CSUN Director of Athletics Brandon Martin. During this era, the Matadors were upset by non-NAIA/NCAA program, Bethesda University to the tune of 100 - 95 under the leadership of Filipino head coach Leo Balayon

=== 2018–2021: Gottfried era ===
On March 13, 2018, Former Alabama and NC State head coach Mark Gottfried was named the 6th head coach in Cal State Northridge Matadors men's basketball history.

In April 2021, Gottfried was placed on administrative leave due to an internal investigation into NCAA rules violations. He never returned; he and CSU Northridge mutually agreed to part ways in December 2021.

=== 2021-2023: Johnson era ===
Trent Johnson, former head coach at Nevada, Stanford, LSU and TCU, was named interim coach for the 2021-22 season shortly after Gottfried was placed on leave. Following the season, Johnson was formally named the seventh head coach in school history. During this era, the Matadors were once again upset by non-NAIA/NCAA program, Bethesda University, 82-80 still under the leadership of coach, Leo Balayon.

=== 2023-present: Newman era ===
On April 15, 2023, former Cal State San Bernardino coach Andy Newman was named head coach for the 2023-24 season.

On December 19, the Matadors upset UCLA 76-72, breaking a losing streak against the Bruins that extended to 2000.

== Postseason ==
=== NCAA tournament results ===
The Matadors have appeared in the NCAA tournament twice, with a combined record of 0–2.

Year	Seed	Round	Opponent	Result
2001	13 M	Round of 64	(4) #12 Kansas	L 75–99
2009	15 W	Round of 64	(2) #3 Memphis	L 70–81

=== NIT results ===
The Matadors have appeared in the National Invitation Tournament (NIT) once. Their record is 0–1.

Year	Round	Opponent	Result
2025	First round	Stanford	L 70–87

=== College Basketball Invitational (CBI) results ===
The Matadors have appeared in the Division I College Basketball Invitational (CBI) once. Their record is 0–1.

Year	Round	Opponent	Result
2019	First round	Utah Valley	L 84–92

=== NCAA Division II tournament results ===
The Matadors have appeared in the NCAA Division II tournament three times. Their combined record is 2–4.

Year	Round	Opponent	Result
1978	Regional Semifinals; Regional Finals	UC Davis; San Diego	W 79–73; L 67–70
1979	Regional Semifinals; Regional Third Place	Puget Sound; San Diego	L 67–81; L 69–74 ^{OT}
1985	Regional Semifinals; Regional Finals	Montana State–Billings; Cal State East Bay	W 70–59; L 48–51
