= List of Air Force Falcons men's basketball head coaches =

The following is a list of Air Force Falcons men's basketball head coaches. The Falcons have had 8 coaches in their 67-season history.

Air Force's current head coach is Joe Scott. He was hired in March 2020 for his second stint as the Falcons' head coach to replace the fired Dave Pilipovich.

No.	Tenure	Coach	Years	Record	Pct.
1	1956–1971	Bob Spear	15	177–175	.503
2	1971–1984	Hank Egan	13	148–185	.444
3	1984–2000	Reggie Minton	16	150–296	.336
4	2000–2004; 2020–present	Joe Scott	7	93–161	.366
5	2004–2005	Chris Mooney	1	18–12	.600
6	2005–2007	Jeff Bzdelik	2	50–16	.758
7	2007–2012 (Note: Air Force fired Jeff Reynolds on February 8, 2012, and named Dave Pilipovich as interim head coach for the remainder of the season.)	Jeff Reynolds	5	63–82	.434
8	2012–2020 (Note: Dave Pilipovich served as interim head coach for six games in 2012, then was named permanent head coach prior to the Falcons' regular-season finale.)	Dave Pilipovich	9	110–151	.421
Totals		8 coaches	67 seasons	800–1,035	.436
Records updated through end of 2022–23 season Source
