= 2019–20 Nevada Wolf Pack men's basketball team =

American college basketball season

2019–20 Nevada Wolf Pack men's basketball

Paradise Jam tournament champions
- Conference: Mountain West Conference
- Record: 19–12 (12–6 MW)
- Head coach: Steve Alford (1st season)
- Associate head coach: Craig Neal (1st season)
- Assistant coaches: Kory Barnett (1st season); Bill Duany (1st season)
- Home arena: Lawlor Events Center

2019–20 Mountain West Conference men's basketball standings
	Conf.				Overall
Team	W		L	PCT	W		L	PCT
No. 6 San Diego State	17	–	1	.944	30	–	2	.938
Utah State †	12	–	6	.667	26	–	8	.765
Nevada	12	–	6	.667	19	–	12	.613
UNLV	12	–	6	.667	17	–	15	.531
Boise State	11	–	7	.611	20	–	12	.625
Colorado State	11	–	7	.611	20	–	12	.625
New Mexico	7	–	11	.389	19	–	14	.576
Fresno State	7	–	11	.389	11	–	19	.367
Air Force	5	–	13	.278	12	–	20	.375
San Jose State	3	–	15	.167	7	–	24	.226
Wyoming	2	–	16	.111	9	–	24	.273
† Conference tournament winner Rankings from AP poll

The 2019–20 Nevada Wolf Pack men's basketball team represented the University of Nevada, Reno during the 2019–20 NCAA Division I men's basketball season. The Wolf Pack, led by first-year head coach Steve Alford, played their home games at the Lawlor Events Center on their campus in Reno, Nevada as members of the Mountain West Conference (MW). They finished the season 19–12, 12–6 in Mountain West play to finish in a three-way tie for second place. They lost in the quarterfinals of the Mountain West tournament to Wyoming.

== Previous season ==
The Wolf Pack finished the season 29–5, 15–3 in Mountain West play to share the regular season Mountain West championship with Utah State. They defeated Boise State in the quarterfinals of the Mountain West tournament before losing in the semifinals to San Diego State. They received an at-large bid to the NCAA tournament where they lost in the first round to Florida.

On April 7, head coach Eric Musselman resigned to become the head coach at Arkansas. He finished at Nevada with a four-year record of 110–34, three trips to the NCAA Tournament, and were champions of the 2016 College Basketball Invitational.

On April 11, Nevada hired Steve Alford as their next head coach.

== Offseason ==
=== Departures ===
Name	Number	Pos.	Height	Weight	Year	Hometown	Reason for departure
Tre'Shawn Thurman	0	F	6'7"	230	RS Senior	Omaha, NE	Graduated
Corey Henson	2	G	6'3"	175	RS Senior	Upper Marlboro, MD	Graduated
Josiah Wood	4	G	6'5"	200	Senior	Reno, NV	Walk-on; left the team for personal reasons
Caleb Martin	10	F	6'7"	205	RS Senior	Mocksville, NC	Graduated/undrafted in 2019 NBA draft
Cody Martin	11	F	6'7"	205	RS Senior	Mocksville, NC	Graduated/2019 NBA draft
Isaiah Rhymes	12	G	6'3"	190	Freshman	Phoenix, AZ	Walk-on; not on team roster
Trey Porter	15	F	6'11"	230	GS Senior	Woodbridge, MA	Graduated
David Cunningham	20	G	6'4"	195	Senior	Sacramento, CA	Graduated
Jordan Brown	21	F	6'11"	210	Freshman	Roseville, CA	Transferred to Arizona
Jalen Townsell	23	G/F	6'7"	198	Freshman	Sparks, NV	Walk-on; transferred to Arizona Western College
Jordan Caroline	24	F	6'7"	230	RS Senior	Champaign, IL	Graduated
Vincent Lee	40	F	6'9"	215	Freshman	Midlothian, TX	Transferred to Cal State Fullerton
Zach Wurm	54	G/F	6'4"	216	Senior	Reno, NV	Walk-on; graduated

=== Incoming transfers ===
Name	Number	Pos.	Height	Weight	Year	Hometown	Previous school
Robby Robinson	0	F	6'8"	225	Sophomore	San Diego, CA	Junior college transferred to San Diego City College
Desmond Cambridge	4	G	6'4"	180	Junior	Nashville, TN	Transferred from Brown. Under NCAA transfer rules, Cambridge will have to sit out for the 2019–20 season. Will have two years of remaining eligibility.
John Carlos Reyes	12	F/C	6'10"	214	RS Senior	Lawrenceville, GA	Transferred from Boston College. Will be eligible to play immediately since Carlos Reyes graduated from Boston College.
Warren Washington	23	F	6'11"	210	Sophomore	San Marcos, CA	Transferred from Oregon State. Under NCAA transfer rules, Washington will have to sit out for the 2019–20 season. Will have three years of remaining eligibility.

=== 2019 recruiting class ===
College recruiting information
Name	Hometown	School	Height	Weight	Commit date
Kane Milling; SG	Poway, CA	Limoges Cercle Saint-Pierre	6 ft 4 in (1.93 m)	165 lb (75 kg)	N/A
Kane Milling; SG	Recruit ratings: Scout: Rivals: (N/A)				
Zane Meeks; PF	Wolfeboro, NH	Brewster Academy	6 ft 9 in (2.06 m)	210 lb (95 kg)	May 16, 2019
Zane Meeks; PF	Recruit ratings: Scout: Rivals: (N/A)				
Overall recruit ranking: Scout: – Rivals: –
Note: In many cases, Scout, Rivals, 247Sports, On3, and ESPN may conflict in their listings of height and weight.; In these cases, the average was taken. ESPN grades are on a 100-point scale.; Sources: "2019 Team Ranking". Rivals.

=== 2020 recruiting class ===
College recruiting information (2020)
Name	Hometown	School	Height	Weight	Commit date
DeAndre Henry; PF	Phoenix, AZ	PHH Prep	6 ft 8 in (2.03 m)	220 lb (100 kg)	Sep 3, 2019
DeAndre Henry; PF	Recruit ratings: Scout: Rivals: (N/A)				
Alem Huseinovic; PF	Scottsdale, AZ	Chaparral High School	6 ft 3 in (1.91 m)	180 lb (82 kg)	Jun 3, 2019
Alem Huseinovic; PF	Recruit ratings: Scout: Rivals: (N/A)				
Overall recruit ranking: Scout: – Rivals: –
Note: In many cases, Scout, Rivals, 247Sports, On3, and ESPN may conflict in their listings of height and weight.; In these cases, the average was taken. ESPN grades are on a 100-point scale.; Sources: "2020 Team Ranking". Rivals.

== Roster ==
2019–20 Nevada Wolf Pack men's basketball team
Players
Coaches

Pos.	#	Name	Height	Weight	Year	Previous school	Hometown
F	1	Robby Robinson	6 ft 8 in (2.03 m)	225 lb (102 kg)	RS So	Kearny High HS; San Diego City College	San Diego, CA
G	2	Jalen Harris	6 ft 5 in (1.96 m)	195 lb (88 kg)	RS Jr	Duncanville HS; Louisiana Tech	Dallas, TX
G	4	Desmond Cambridge (redshirt)	6 ft 4 in (1.93 m)	180 lb (82 kg)	Jr	The Hun School; Brown	Nashville, TN
G	5	Nisre Zouzoua	6 ft 3 in (1.91 m)	195 lb (88 kg)	RS Sr	Boston Trinity Academy; Bryant	Brockton, MA
G	10	Gabe Bansuelo (W)	6 ft 1 in (1.85 m)	165 lb (75 kg)	Fr	Bishop Manogue HS	Reno, NV
G	11	Kane Milling (W)	6 ft 4 in (1.93 m)	180 lb (82 kg)	Fr	CSP Limoges	Nantes, France
F	12	John Carlos Reyes	6 ft 10 in (2.08 m)	225 lb (102 kg)	RS Sr	Sound Doctrine Christian Academy; Boston College	Lawrenceville, GA
G	13	Khristion Courseault (W) (redshirt)	6 ft 2 in (1.88 m)	180 lb (82 kg)	So	Loyola HS; Pasadena City College	Los Angeles, CA
G	14	Lindsey Drew	6 ft 4 in (1.93 m)	180 lb (82 kg)	RS Sr	Fairfax HS	Encino, CA
F	15	Zane Meeks	6 ft 10 in (2.08 m)	215 lb (98 kg)	Fr	Brewster Academy	Prairie Village, KS
G	22	Jazz Johnson	5 ft 10 in (1.78 m)	180 lb (82 kg)	RS Sr	Lake Oswego HS; Portland	Lake Oswego, OR
F	23	Warren Washington (redshirt)	7 ft 0 in (2.13 m)	215 lb (98 kg)	So	Mission Hills HS; Oregon State	San Marcos, CA
F	42	K .J. Hymes	6 ft 10 in (2.08 m)	210 lb (95 kg)	RS Fr	Hillcrest Prep	Phoenix, AZ
F	44	Zachary Williams (W)	6 ft 7 in (2.01 m)	205 lb (93 kg)	Jr	Galena HS; South Mountain CC	Reno, NV

Head coach

- Steve Alford (Indiana)

Assistant coach(es)

- Craig Neal (Georgia Tech)
- Kory Barnett (Indiana)
- Bill Duany (Indiana)

Legend

- (C) Team captain
- (S) Suspended
- (I) Ineligible
- (W) Walk-on
- Injured
- Current redshirt

Roster

== Schedule and results ==
Date time, TV	Rank^{#}	Opponent^{#}	Result	Record	Site city, state
Exhibition
October 19, 2019*; 5:00 pm		Cal State East Bay	W 81–52	–	Lawlor Events Center (2,700); Reno, NV
October 30, 2019*; 7:30 pm		Colorado Christian	W 86–55	–	Lawlor Events Center (2,032); Reno, NV
Regular season
November 5, 2019*; 7:30 pm, CBSSN		Utah	L 74–79	0–1	Lawlor Events Center (8,324); Reno, NV
November 9, 2019*; 7:00 pm, ATTSNRM		Loyola Marymount	W 72–67	1–1	Lawlor Events Center (8,136); Reno, NV
November 12, 2019*; 7:00 pm, NSN		UT Arlington	W 80–73	2–1	Lawlor Events Center (7,504); Reno, NV
November 16, 2019*; 8:00 pm, CBSSN		USC	L 66–76	2–2	Lawlor Events Center (9,833); Reno, NV
November 19, 2019*; 4:00 pm, ESPN+		at Davidson	L 71–91	2–3	John M. Belk Arena (3,106); Davidson, NC
November 22, 2019*; 1:15 pm, FloSports		vs. Fordham; Paradise Jam tournament quarterfinals	W 74–60	3–3	Sports and Fitness Center (1,524); Saint Thomas, USVI
November 24, 2019*; 2:30 pm, FloSports		vs. Valparaiso; Paradise Jam Tournament semifinals	W 84–59	4–3	Sports and Fitness Center; Saint Thomas, USVI
November 25, 2019*; 5:00 pm, FloSports		vs. Bowling Green; Paradise Jam tournament championship	W 77–62	5–3	Sports and Fitness Center (1,924); Saint Thomas, USVI
December 4, 2019*; 7:00 pm, NSN		Santa Clara	W 98–67	6–3	Lawlor Events Center (7,577); Reno, NV
December 7, 2019; 11:00 am, ATTSNRM		at Air Force	W 100–85	7–3 (1–0)	Clune Arena (1,715); Colorado Springs, CO
December 10, 2019*; 6:00 pm, ESPNU		at BYU	L 42–75	7–4	Marriott Center (10,570); Provo, UT
December 18, 2019*; 7:00 pm, NSN		Texas Southern	W 91–73	8–4	Lawlor Events Center (8,131); Reno, NV
December 21, 2019*; 9:30 pm, ESPNU		vs. Saint Mary's; Al Attles Classic	L 63–68	8–5	Chase Center (6,728); San Francisco, CA
January 1, 2020; 7:00 pm, ATTSNRM		Colorado State	W 67–61	9–5 (2–0)	Lawlor Events Center (8,659); Reno, NV
January 4, 2020; 3:00 pm, CBSSN		Boise State	W 83–66	10–5 (3–0)	Lawlor Events Center (8,681); Reno, NV
January 8, 2020; 7:00 pm, MWN		at San Jose State	L 68–70	10–6 (3–1)	Provident Credit Union Event Center (1,459); San Jose, CA
January 11, 2020; 5:00 pm, CBSSN		at Utah State	L 70–80	10–7 (3–2)	Smith Spectrum (8,725); Logan, UT
January 14, 2020; 7:00 pm, CBSSN		Wyoming	W 68–67	11–7 (4–2)	Lawlor Events Center (8,047); Reno, NV
January 18, 2020; 5:00 pm, CBSSN		at No. 7 San Diego State	L 55–68	11–8 (4–3)	Viejas Arena (12,414); San Diego, CA
January 22, 2020; 8:00 pm, CBSSN		UNLV	W 86–72	12–8 (5–3)	Lawlor Events Center (10,325); Reno, NV
January 25, 2020; 5:00 pm, CBSSN		New Mexico	W 96–74	13–8 (6–3)	Lawlor Events Center (8,979); Reno, NV
January 29, 2020; 6:00 pm, ESPN3		at Colorado State	L 91–92	13–9 (6–4)	Moby Arena (3,137); Fort Collins, CO
February 1, 2020; 7:00 pm, ESPNU		at Boise State	L 64–73	13–10 (6–5)	ExtraMile Arena (6,538); Boise, ID
February 4, 2020; 8:00 pm, ESPN2		Air Force	W 88–54	14–10 (7–5)	Lawlor Events Center (8,299); Reno, NV
February 8, 2020; 4:00pm, ATTSNRM		San Jose State	W 95–77	15–10 (8–5)	Lawlor Events Center (8,310); Reno, NV
February 12, 2020; 7:00 pm, ESPN3		at UNLV	W 82–79 ^{OT}	16–10 (9–5)	Thomas & Mack Center (11,607); Paradise, NV
February 18, 2020; 6:00 pm, ESPNU		at New Mexico	W 88–74	17–10 (10–5)	Dreamstyle Arena (12,032); Albuquerque, NM
February 22, 2020; 7:00 pm, ESPNU		Fresno State	W 78–76	18–10 (11–5)	Lawlor Events Center (9,155); Reno, NV
February 25, 2020; 7:00 pm, ATTSNRM		at Wyoming	W 73–68	19–10 (12–5)	Arena-Auditorium (3,007); Laramie, WY
February 29, 2020; 5:00 pm, ESPN2		No. 5 San Diego State	L 76–83	19–11 (12–6)	Lawlor Events Center (10,855); Reno, NV
Mountain West tournament
March 5, 2020; 8:30 pm, CBSSN	(3)	vs. (11) Wyoming; Quarterfinals	L 71–74	19–12	Thomas & Mack Center (7,723); Paradise, NV
*Non-conference game. (#) Tournament seedings in parentheses. All times are in Pacific Time.
