= 2019–20 San Diego State Aztecs men's basketball team =

American college basketball season

2019–20 San Diego State Aztecs men's basketball

Mountain West regular season champions Las Vegas Invitational champions
- Conference: Mountain West Conference

Ranking
- Coaches: No. 6
- AP: No. 6
- Record: 30–2 (17–1 MW)
- Head coach: Brian Dutcher (3rd season)
- Assistant coaches: Dave Velasquez; Chris Acker; Jay Morris
- Offensive scheme: Wheel
- Base defense: Pack-Line
- Home arena: Viejas Arena (Capacity: 12,414)

2019–20 Mountain West Conference men's basketball standings
	Conf.				Overall
Team	W		L	PCT	W		L	PCT
No. 6 San Diego State	17	–	1	.944	30	–	2	.938
Utah State †	12	–	6	.667	26	–	8	.765
Nevada	12	–	6	.667	19	–	12	.613
UNLV	12	–	6	.667	17	–	15	.531
Boise State	11	–	7	.611	20	–	12	.625
Colorado State	11	–	7	.611	20	–	12	.625
New Mexico	7	–	11	.389	19	–	14	.576
Fresno State	7	–	11	.389	11	–	19	.367
Air Force	5	–	13	.278	12	–	20	.375
San Jose State	3	–	15	.167	7	–	24	.226
Wyoming	2	–	16	.111	9	–	24	.273
† Conference tournament winner Rankings from AP poll

The 2019–20 San Diego State Aztecs men's basketball team represented San Diego State University during the 2019–20 NCAA Division I men's basketball season. The Aztecs, led by third-year head coach Brian Dutcher, played their home games at Viejas Arena as members in the Mountain West Conference. They finished the season 30–2, 17–1 in Mountain West play to be regular season Mountain West champions. They defeated Air Force and Boise State to reach the championship game of the Mountain West tournament where they lost to Utah State. Although they were a virtual lock to receive an at-large bid to and a high seed in the NCAA tournament, on March 12 the NCAA Tournament was cancelled amid the COVID-19 pandemic.

== Previous season ==
The Aztecs finished the season 21–13, 11–7 in Mountain West play to finish in a tie for fourth place. They defeated UNLV and Nevada to advance to the championship game of the Mountain West tournament where they lost to Utah State. They did not get selected for the NCAA or NIT tournaments, and despite having 21 wins, they did not seek participation in other post season tournaments such as the CBI or CIT.

== Offseason ==
=== Departures ===
Name	Number	Pos.	Height	Weight	Year	Hometown	Reason for departure
Devin Watson	0	G	6'1"	172	RS Senior	Oceanside, CA	Graduated
Michael Sohikish	4	G	5'9"	160	Senior	San Diego, CA	Walk-on; graduated
Jalen McDaniels	5	F	6'10"	195	RS Sophomore	Federal Way, WA	Declare for 2019 NBA draft
Ed Chang	23	G/F	6'8"	210	Freshman	Papillion, NE	Transferred to Salt Lake CC
Jeremy Hemsley	42	G	6'4"	200	Senior	La Verne, CA	Graduated

=== Incoming transfers ===
Name	Number	Pos.	Height	Weight	Year	Hometown	Previous school
Trey Pulliam	4	G	6'3"		Sophomore	Bryan, TX	Junior college transferred Navarro College.
Yanni Wetzell	5	F/C	6'10"	240	RS Senior	Auckland, New Zealand	Transferred from Vanderbilt. Will be eligible to play immediately since Wetzell graduated from Vanderbilt.
K. J. Feagin	10	G	6'1"	190	RS Senior	Long Beach, CA	Transferred from Santa Clara. Will be eligible to play immediately since Feagin graduated from Santa Clara.

=== 2019 recruiting class ===
College recruiting information
Name	Hometown	School	Height	Weight	Commit date
Keshad Johnson; PF	Oakland, CA	San Leandro High School	6 ft 7 in (2.01 m)	200 lb (91 kg)	Nov 8, 2018
Keshad Johnson; PF	Recruit ratings: Scout: Rivals: 247Sports: ESPN: (80)				
Overall recruit ranking:
Note: In many cases, Scout, Rivals, 247Sports, On3, and ESPN may conflict in their listings of height and weight.; In these cases, the average was taken. ESPN grades are on a 100-point scale.; Sources: "2019 San Diego St. Basketball Commitment List". Rivals.; "2019 San Diego St. Player Commits". ESPN.; "2019 Team Ranking". Rivals.

=== 2020 recruiting class ===
College recruiting information (2020)
Name	Hometown	School	Height	Weight	Commit date
Lamont Butler; PG	Riverside, CA	Riverside Polytech High School	5 ft 10 in (1.78 m)	175 lb (79 kg)	Jun 19, 2019
Lamont Butler; PG	Recruit ratings: Scout: Rivals: 247Sports: ESPN: (80)				
Che Evans; SF	Baltimore, MD	Dulaney High School	6 ft 5 in (1.96 m)	205 lb (93 kg)	Sep 12, 2019
Che Evans; SF	Recruit ratings: Scout: Rivals: 247Sports: ESPN: (79)				
Keith Dinwiddie; SG	Culver City, CA	Fairfax High School	6 ft 2 in (1.88 m)	175 lb (79 kg)	Sep 10, 2019
Keith Dinwiddie; SG	Recruit ratings: Scout: Rivals: 247Sports: ESPN: (NR)				
Overall recruit ranking:
Note: In many cases, Scout, Rivals, 247Sports, On3, and ESPN may conflict in their listings of height and weight.; In these cases, the average was taken. ESPN grades are on a 100-point scale.; Sources: "2020 San Diego St. Basketball Commitment List". Rivals.; "2020 San Diego St. Player Commits". ESPN.; "2020 Team Ranking". Rivals.

== Roster ==
2019–20 San Diego State Aztecs men's basketball team
Players
Coaches

Pos.	#	Name	Height	Weight	Year	Previous school	Hometown
F	0	Keshad Johnson	6 ft 7 in (2.01 m)	208 lb (94 kg)	Fr	San Leandro	Oakland, California
G	2	Adam Seiko	6 ft 3 in (1.91 m)	195 lb (88 kg)	RS So	Sierra Canyon	Boston, Massachusetts
F	3	Aguek Arop	6 ft 6 in (1.98 m)	220 lb (100 kg)	So	Omaha South HS	Omaha, Nebraska
G	4	Trey Pulliam	6 ft 3 in (1.91 m)	180 lb (82 kg)	Jr	A&M Consolidated; Navarro College	Bryan, Texas
F	5	Yanni Wetzell	6 ft 10 in (2.08 m)	240 lb (109 kg)	RS Sr	Westlake; Vanderbilt	Auckland, New Zealand
G	10	K. J. Feagin	6 ft 1 in (1.85 m)	190 lb (86 kg)	RS Sr	Long Beach Poly; Santa Clara	Long Beach, California
F	11	Matt Mitchell	6 ft 6 in (1.98 m)	225 lb (102 kg)	Jr	Roosevelt HS	Riverside, California
F	12	Nolan Narain	6 ft 10 in (2.08 m)	230 lb (104 kg)	RS Sr	La Lumiere School	Hamilton, Ontario
G	13	Caleb Giordano (W)	6 ft 3 in (1.91 m)	190 lb (86 kg)	RS So	Great Oak; San Diego Miramar College	La Mesa, California
G	20	Jordan Schakel	6 ft 6 in (1.98 m)	200 lb (91 kg)	Jr	Bishop Montgomery HS	Torrance, California
G	21	Jared Barnett (W)	6 ft 1 in (1.85 m)	170 lb (77 kg)	Fr	Westchester	Los Angeles, California
G	22	Malachi Flynn	6 ft 1 in (1.85 m)	185 lb (84 kg)	RS Jr	Bellarmine Prep; Washington State	Tacoma, Washington
F	31	Nathan Mensah (injured)	6 ft 10 in (2.08 m)	220 lb (100 kg)	So	Findlay Prep	Accra, Ghana
F	35	Joel Mensah	6 ft 10 in (2.08 m)	210 lb (95 kg)	So	JSerra Catholic HS	Accra, Ghana

Head coach

- Brian Dutcher (Minnesota)

Assistant coach(es)

- Dave Velasquez (San Diego State)
- Chris Acker (Chaminade)
- Jay Morris (Cal State Dominguez Hills)

Legend

- (C) Team captain
- (S) Suspended
- (I) Ineligible
- (W) Walk-on
- Injured
- Current redshirt

Roster

== Schedule and results ==
Date time, TV	Rank^{#}	Opponent^{#}	Result	Record	High points	High rebounds	High assists	Site (attendance) city, state
Exhibition
October 30, 2019*; 7:00 pm		UC San Diego	W 86–51	–	12 – Tied	9 – Flynn	7 – Flynn	Viejas Arena (9,926); San Diego, CA
Regular season
November 5, 2019*; 7:00 pm		Texas Southern	W 77–42	1–0	15 – Tied	11 – Mensah	5 – Flynn	Viejas Arena (10,093); San Diego, CA
November 9, 2019*; 1:00 pm, BYUtv		at BYU	W 76–71	2–0	19 – Schakel	11 – Mensah	5 – Flynn	Marriott Center (12,567); Provo, UT
November 13, 2019*; 7:00 pm, Stadium		Grand Canyon	W 86–61	3–0	14 – Tied	9 – Mensah	9 – Flynn	Viejas Arena (10,440); San Diego, CA
November 20, 2019*; 8:00 pm, FSW		at San Diego; City Championship	W 66–49	4–0	20 – Wetzell	12 – Wetzell	4 – Feagin	Jenny Craig Pavilion (4,524); San Diego, CA
November 22, 2019*; 7:00 pm		LIU; Las Vegas Invitational campus site game	W 81–64	5–0	18 – Mitchell	7 – Mensah	10 – Flynn	Viejas Arena (10,243); San Diego, CA
November 25, 2019*; 7:00 pm		Tennessee State; Las Vegas Invitational campus site game	W 62–49	6–0	11 – Flynn	6 – Schakel	4 – Flynn	Viejas Arena (10,430); San Diego, CA
November 28, 2019*; 7:30 pm, FS1		vs. Creighton; Las Vegas Invitational semifinals	W 83–52	7–0	21 – Flynn	6 – Tied	5 – Feagin	Orleans Arena; Paradise, NV
November 29, 2019*; 5:00 pm, FS1		vs. Iowa; Las Vegas Invitational championship	W 83–73	8–0	28 – Flynn	6 – Schakel	5 – Feagin	Orleans Arena (4,855); Paradise, NV
December 4, 2019; 6:00 pm, Stadium		at Colorado State	W 79–57	9–0 (1–0)	23 – Flynn	8 – Mitchell	7 – Flynn	Moby Arena (3,419); Fort Collins, CO
December 8, 2019; 12:00 pm, FSSD		San Jose State	W 59–57	10–0 (2–0)	13 – Mitchell	12 – Mensah	3 – Feagin	Viejas Arena (11,925); San Diego, CA
December 18, 2019*; 7:00 pm	No. 20	San Diego Christian	W 92–48	11–0	17 – Wetzell	6 – Tied	8 – Feagin	Viejas Arena (10,158); San Diego, CA
December 21, 2019*; 3:30 pm, P12N	No. 20	vs. Utah; Basketball Hall of Fame Classic	W 80–52	12–0	16 – Flynn	6 – Wetzell	8 – Flynn	Staples Center; Los Angeles, CA
December 28, 2019*; 4:00 pm, FSSD	No. 15	Cal Poly	W 73–57	13–0	14 – Flynn	8 – Wetzell	7 – Flynn	Viejas Arena (12,414); San Diego, CA
January 1, 2020; 12:00 pm, Stadium	No. 13	Fresno State	W 61–52	14–0 (3–0)	16 – Flynn	8 – Wetzell	3 – Pulliam	Viejas Arena (12,414); San Diego, CA
January 4, 2020; 7:00 pm, CBSSN	No. 13	at Utah State	W 77–68	15–0 (4–0)	22 – Flynn	7 – Mitchell	5 – Pulliam	Smith Spectrum (10,017); Logan, UT
January 8, 2020; 6:00 pm, Stadium	No. 7	at Wyoming	W 72–52	16–0 (5–0)	19 – Flynn	8 – Mitchell	4 – Flynn	Arena-Auditorium (2,941); Laramie, WY
January 11, 2020; 7:00 pm, ESPN3	No. 7	Boise State	W 83–65	17–0 (6–0)	23 – Feagin	7 – Mitchell	6 – Flynn	Viejas Arena (12,414); San Diego, CA
January 14, 2020; 8:00 pm, ESPN2	No. 7	at Fresno State	W 64–55	18–0 (7–0)	22 – Flynn	8 – Mitchell	2 – Tied	Save Mart Center (6,773); Fresno, CA
January 18, 2020; 5:00 pm, CBSSN	No. 7	Nevada	W 68–55	19–0 (8–0)	17 – Wetzell	16 – Wetzell	7 – Flynn	Viejas Arena (12,414); San Diego, CA
January 21, 2020; 8:00 pm, CBSSN	No. 4	Wyoming	W 72–55	20–0 (9–0)	18 – Flynn	4 – Wetzell	5 – Tied	Viejas Arena (12,414); San Diego, CA
January 26, 2020; 1:00 pm, CBSSN	No. 4	at UNLV	W 71–67	21–0 (10–0)	21 – Flynn	8 – Wetzell	4 – Wetzell	Thomas & Mack Center (12,287); Paradise, NV
January 29, 2020; 6:00 pm, CBSSN	No. 4	at New Mexico	W 85–57	22–0 (11–0)	18 – Feagin	9 – Schakel	6 – Flynn	Dreamstyle Arena (13,241); Albuquerque, NM
February 1, 2020; 7:00 pm, CBSSN	No. 4	Utah State	W 80–68	23–0 (12–0)	28 – Mitchell	10 – Wetzell	7 – Flynn	Viejas Arena (12,414); San Diego, CA
February 8, 2020; 5:00 pm, CBSSN	No. 4	at Air Force	W 89–74	24–0 (13–0)	21 – Feagin	8 – Flynn	7 – Flynn	Clune Arena (4,401); Colorado Springs, CO
February 11, 2020; 8:00 pm, ESPN2	No. 4	New Mexico	W 82–59	25–0 (14–0)	22 – Mitchell	12 – Mitchell	4 – Mitchell	Viejas Arena (12,414); San Diego, CA
February 16, 2020; 1:00 pm, CBSSN	No. 4	at Boise State	W 72–55	26–0 (15–0)	22 – Flynn	7 – Tied	6 – Flynn	ExtraMile Arena (10,651); Boise, ID
February 22, 2020; 4:30 pm, CBSSN	No. 4	UNLV	L 63–66	26–1 (15–1)	24 – Flynn	9 – Flynn	6 – Flynn	Viejas Arena (12,414); San Diego, CA
February 25, 2020; 8:00 pm, CBSSN	No. 5	Colorado State	W 66–60	27–1 (16–1)	17 – Flynn	7 – Wetzell	5 – Feagin	Viejas Arena (12,414); San Diego, CA
February 29, 2020; 5:00 pm, ESPN2	No. 5	at Nevada	W 83–76	28–1 (17–1)	36 – Flynn	6 – Wetzell	5 – Flynn	Lawlor Events Center (10,855); Reno, NV
Mountain West tournament
March 5, 2020; 11:30 am, CBSSN	(1) No. 5	vs. (9) Air Force; Quarterfinals	W 73–60	29–1	17 – Schakel	7 – Flynn	8 – Flynn	Thomas & Mack Center (8,189); Paradise, NV
March 6, 2020; 6:00 pm, CBSSN	(1) No. 5	vs. (5) Boise State; Semifinals	W 81–68	30–1	22 – Flynn	6 – Tied	5 – Flynn	Thomas & Mack Center (9,630); Paradise, NV
March 7, 2020; 2:30 pm, CBS	(1) No. 5	vs. (2) Utah State; Championship	L 56–59	30–2	16 – Flynn	13 – Wetzell	4 – Mitchell	Thomas & Mack Center (10,292); Paradise, NV
*Non-conference game. ^{#}Rankings from AP Poll. (#) Tournament seedings in parentheses. All times are in Pacific Time.

== Ranking movement ==
Ranking movements Legend: ██ Increase in ranking ██ Decrease in ranking — = Not ranked RV = Received votes
	Week																			
Poll	Pre	1	2	3	4	5	6	7	8	9	10	11	12	13	14	15	16	17	18	Final
AP	—	RV	RV	RV	RV	25	20	15	13	7	7	4	4	4	4	4	5	5	6	6
Coaches	—	—	—	—	RV	24	20	14	12	7	6	4	4	4	4	4	5	5	6	6

*AP does not release post-NCAA Tournament rankings.
