= 2019–20 Air Force Falcons men's basketball team =

American college basketball season

2019–20 Air Force Falcons men's basketball
- Conference: Mountain West Conference
- Record: 12–20 (5–13 MW)
- Head coach: Dave Pilipovich (8th season)
- Assistant coaches: Kurt Kanaskie; Andrew Moore; Nate Zandt; Byron Jones
- Home arena: Clune Arena

2019–20 Mountain West Conference men's basketball standings
	Conf.				Overall
Team	W		L	PCT	W		L	PCT
No. 6 San Diego State	17	–	1	.944	30	–	2	.938
Utah State †	12	–	6	.667	26	–	8	.765
Nevada	12	–	6	.667	19	–	12	.613
UNLV	12	–	6	.667	17	–	15	.531
Boise State	11	–	7	.611	20	–	12	.625
Colorado State	11	–	7	.611	20	–	12	.625
New Mexico	7	–	11	.389	19	–	14	.576
Fresno State	7	–	11	.389	11	–	19	.367
Air Force	5	–	13	.278	12	–	20	.375
San Jose State	3	–	15	.167	7	–	24	.226
Wyoming	2	–	16	.111	9	–	24	.273
† Conference tournament winner Rankings from AP poll

The 2019–20 Air Force Falcons men's basketball team represented the United States Air Force Academy during the 2019–20 NCAA Division I men's basketball season. The Falcons, led by eighth-year head coach Dave Pilipovich, played their home games at Clune Arena on the Air Force Academy's main campus in Colorado Springs, Colorado. They finished the season 12–20, 5–13 in Mountain West play to finish in ninth place. They defeated Fresno State in the first round of the Mountain West tournament before losing in the quarterfinals to San Diego State.

Piplovich was fired on March 9, 2020 following the conclusion of the season. He finished at Air Force with an eight-year record of 110–151.

== Previous season ==
The Falcons finished the season 14–18, 8–10 in Mountain West play to finish in sixth place. They defeated San Jose State in the first round of the Mountain West tournament before losing in the quarterfinals to Fresno State.

== Offseason ==
=== Departures ===
Name	Number	Pos.	Height	Weight	Year	Hometown	Reason for departure
Zach Couper	2	G	6'4'	205	Freshman	Rockford, IL	Left the team for personal reasons
Ameka Akaya	11	F	6'6"	215	Sophomore	Hagerstown, MD	Left the team for personal reasons
Nic Wells	14	G	6'6"	210	Junior	Riverdale, GA	Left the team for personal reasons
Pervis Louder	22	G	6'4"	187	Senior	Raleigh, NC	Graduated
Charles O'Briant	24	G	6'8"	205	Sophomore	Johns Creek, GA	Left the team for personal reasons
Bryce Hughes	25	G	6'4"	195	Sophomore	San Antonio, TX	Left the team for personal reasons
James Edwards	35	F	6'0"	165	Sophomore	Allison Park, PA	Left the team for personal reasons

=== 2019 recruiting class ===
College recruiting information
Name	Hometown	School	Height	Weight	Commit date
Glen McClintock; PG	Kansas City, MO	Rockhurst High School	6 ft 3 in (1.91 m)	N/A	
Glen McClintock; PG	Recruit ratings: Scout: Rivals: (N/A)				
Carter Murphy; SG	Phoenix, AZ	Arcadia High School	6 ft 4 in (1.93 m)	180 lb (82 kg)	
Carter Murphy; SG	Recruit ratings: Scout: Rivals: (N/A)				
Jordan Simmons; PG	Addison, TX	Greenhill High School	6 ft 4 in (1.93 m)	N/A	Oct 1, 2018
Jordan Simmons; PG	Recruit ratings: Scout: Rivals: (N/A)				
Christian DePollar; SG	Alexandria, VA	St. Stephen's & St. Agnes School	6 ft 5 in (1.96 m)	190 lb (86 kg)	
Christian DePollar; SG	Recruit ratings: Scout: Rivals: (N/A)				
Joseph Octave; SG	Gardena, CA	Mary Star Of Sea High School	6 ft 3 in (1.91 m)	180 lb (82 kg)	
Joseph Octave; SG	Recruit ratings: Scout: Rivals: (N/A)				
Overall recruit ranking: Scout: – Rivals: –
Note: In many cases, Scout, Rivals, 247Sports, On3, and ESPN may conflict in their listings of height and weight.; In these cases, the average was taken. ESPN grades are on a 100-point scale.; Sources: "2019 Team Ranking". Rivals.

=== 2020 recruiting class ===
College recruiting information (2020)
Name	Hometown	School	Height	Weight	Commit date
Carlos Miller Jr. SG	Little Rock, AR	Hall High School	6 ft 3 in (1.91 m)	N/A	
Carlos Miller Jr. SG	Recruit ratings: Scout: Rivals: (N/A)				
Overall recruit ranking: Scout: – Rivals: –
Note: In many cases, Scout, Rivals, 247Sports, On3, and ESPN may conflict in their listings of height and weight.; In these cases, the average was taken. ESPN grades are on a 100-point scale.; Sources: "2020 Team Ranking". Rivals.

== Roster ==
2019–20 Air Force Falcons men's basketball team
Players
Coaches

Pos.	#	Name	Height	Weight	Year	Previous school	Hometown
G	0	Caleb Morris	6 ft 4 in (1.93 m)	185 lb (84 kg)	Sr	Army and Navy Academy	Vista, CA
G	2	Solomon Pierre-Louis	6 ft 3 in (1.91 m)	175 lb (79 kg)	Fr	The Wellington School	Columbus, OH
G	3	Sid Tomes	6 ft 4 in (1.93 m)	200 lb (91 kg)	Sr	East Ridge	Woodbury, MN
G	4	Carter Murphy	6 ft 4 in (1.93 m)	190 lb (86 kg)	Fr	Arcadia	Phoenix, AZ
G	5	Chris Joyce	6 ft 5 in (1.96 m)	193 lb (88 kg)	Jr	Bishop Kenny	Jacksonville, FL
G	10	A. J. Walker	6 ft 2 in (1.88 m)	191 lb (87 kg)	So	St. Mary's Hall	San Antonio, TX
F	12	Lavelle Scottie	6 ft 7 in (2.01 m)	225 lb (102 kg)	Sr	Arlington Heights	Fort Worth, TX
G	13	LeSean Brown	6 ft 2 in (1.88 m)	185 lb (84 kg)	Sr	TMI Episcopal	San Antonio, TX
G	14	Marcus Hill	6 ft 0 in (1.83 m)	185 lb (84 kg)	Fr	Jesuit Prep of Dallas	Dallas, TX
F	15	Abe Kinrade	6 ft 7 in (2.01 m)	200 lb (91 kg)	So	Maquoketa	Maquoeketa, IA
F	20	Isaac Monson	6 ft 9 in (2.06 m)	205 lb (93 kg)	So	Olympus	Salt Lake City, UT
G	21	Nick René	6 ft 0 in (1.83 m)	180 lb (82 kg)	Fr	Lakeview Centennial	Garland, TX
F	22	Nikc Jackson	6 ft 8 in (2.03 m)	195 lb (88 kg)	Fr	Rancho Solano	Scottsdale, AZ
G	23	Deven Nelson	6 ft 1 in (1.85 m)	185 lb (84 kg)	Fr	Mesa Ridge	Fountain, CO
G	24	Mason Taylor	6 ft 4 in (1.93 m)	190 lb (86 kg)	Fr	Grandview	Kansas City, MO
G	30	Camden Vander Zwaag	6 ft 4 in (1.93 m)	200 lb (91 kg)	Fr	Johnston	Johnson, IA
F	31	CJ Haut	6 ft 8 in (2.03 m)	200 lb (91 kg)	Fr	St. Mary's Prep	Monroe, WI
G	32	Simon Banks	6 ft 1 in (1.85 m)	185 lb (84 kg)	Fr	Brebeuf Jesuit Prep	Indianapolis, IN
C	34	Ryan Swan	6 ft 8 in (2.03 m)	240 lb (109 kg)	Sr	Overland	Aurora, CO
C	40	Anthony Charles	6 ft 8 in (2.03 m)	205 lb (93 kg)	Fr	Strength N Motion Prep	Orlando, FL
G	44	Keaton Van Soelen	6 ft 7 in (2.01 m)	195 lb (88 kg)	Jr	Des Moines Christian	Waukee, IA

Head coach

- Dave Pilipovich (Thiel)

Assistant coach(es)

- Kurt Kanaskie (La Salle)
- Andy Moore (Muskingum)
- Nate Zandt (Michigan
- Byron Jones (Central Oklahoma)

Legend

- (C) Team captain
- (S) Suspended
- (I) Ineligible
- (W) Walk-on
- Injured
- Current redshirt

Roster
Last update: November 15, 2019

== Schedule and results ==
Date time, TV	Rank^{#}	Opponent^{#}	Result	Record	Site (attendance) city, state
Exhibition
Nov 1, 2019*; 7:00 pm		Colorado Christian	W 85–73		Clune Arena; Colorado Springs, CO
Regular season
Nov 7, 2019*; 7:00 pm		Idaho State	L 79–89	0–1	Clune Arena (1,633); Colorado Springs, CO
Nov 9, 2019*; 2:00 pm		Texas State	W 78–71	1–1	Clune Arena (1,526); Colorado Springs, CO
Nov 12, 2019*; 5:00 pm, Stadium		at Army	W 69–57	2–1	Christl Arena (546); West Point, NY
Nov 18, 2019*; 7:00 pm, FSSW+		at TCU	L 54–65	2–2	Schollmaier Arena (6,110); Fort Worth, TX
Nov 21, 2019*; 2:00 pm, FloHoops		vs. Loyola Marymount; Junkanoo Jam	L 64–78	2–3	Gateway Christian Academy (200); Bimini, Bahamas
Nov 22, 2019*; 4:30 pm, FloHoops		vs. Duquesne; Junkanoo Jam	L 63–69	2–4	Gateway Christian Academy (250); Bimini, Bahamas
Nov 24, 2019*; 2:00 pm, FloHoops		vs. Indiana State; Junkanoo Jam	L 74–84	2–5	Gateway Christian Academy (150); Bimini, Bahamas
Dec 1, 2019*; 2:00 pm		Jackson State	W 76–52	3–5	Clune Arena (1,438); Colorado Springs, CO
Dec 4, 2019; 7:00 pm		at Wyoming	W 86–77	4–5 (1–0)	Arena-Auditorium (3,013); Laramie, WY
Dec 7, 2019; 12:00 pm, ATTSNRM		Nevada	L 85–100	4–6 (1–1)	Clune Arena (1,517); Colorado Springs, CO
Dec 14, 2019*; 1:00 pm		at Denver	W 79–75	5–6	Magness Arena (1,170); Denver, CO
Dec 17, 2019*; 7:00 pm		Johnson & Wales (CO)	W 99–42	6–6	Clune Arena (1,386); Colorado Springs, CO
Dec 21, 2019*; 12:00 pm		Drake	L 80–85	6–7	Clune Arena (1,791); Colorado Springs, CO
Dec 31, 2019*; 2:00 pm		UC Riverside	W 105–56	7–7	Clune Arena (1,356); Colorado Springs, CO
Jan 4, 2020; 8:00 pm, ESPNU		at UNLV	L 59–71	7–8 (1–2)	Thomas & Mack Center (7,633); Paradise, NV
Jan 7, 2020; 9:00 pm, ESPN2		Utah State	W 79–60	8–8 (2–2)	Clune Arena (4,563); Colorado Springs, CO
Jan 11, 2020; 4:00 pm, Stadium		at New Mexico	L 78–84	8–9 (2–3)	Dreamstyle Arena (11,014); Albuquerque, NM
Jan 15, 2020; 7:00 pm, ATTSNRM		Boise State	W 85–78	9–9 (3–3)	Clune Arena (1,758); Colorado Springs, CO
Jan 18, 2020; 2:00 pm, ATTSNRM		Colorado State	L 65–78	9–10 (3–4)	Clune Arena (2,475); Colorado Springs, CO
Jan 21, 2020; 9:00 pm, ESPNU		at Utah State	L 47–72	9–11 (3–5)	Smith Spectrum (8,442); Logan, UT
Jan 25, 2020; 3:00 pm		at San Jose State	L 81–90	9–12 (3–6)	Provident Credit Union Event Center (1,534); San Jose, CA
Jan 28, 2020; 7:00 pm, ATTSNRM		Fresno State	L 68–79	9–13 (3–7)	Clune Arena (1,535); Colorado Springs, CO
Feb 4, 2020; 9:00 pm, ESPN2		at Nevada	L 54–88	9–14 (3–8)	Lawlor Events Center (8,299); Reno, NV
Feb 8, 2020; 6:00 pm, CBSSN		No. 4 San Diego State	L 74–89	9–15 (3–9)	Clune Arena (4,401); Colorado Springs, CO
Feb 11, 2020; 7:00 pm, ATTSNRM		at Boise State	L 57–74	9–16 (3–10)	ExtraMile Arena (4,898); Boise, ID
Feb 15, 2020; 2:00 pm		San Jose State	W 95–86	10–16 (4–10)	Clune Arena (2,178); Colorado Springs, CO
Feb 19, 2020; 8:00 pm, ESPN3		at Fresno State	L 62–71	10–17 (4–11)	Save Mart Center (4,608); Fresno, CA
Feb 22, 2020; 2:00 pm, ATTSNRM		Wyoming	L 72–78	10–18 (4–12)	Clune Arena (1,529); Colorado Springs, CO
Feb 26, 2020; 7:00 pm, ESPN3		New Mexico	W 60–58	11–18 (5–12)	Clune Arena (1,925); Colorado Springs, CO
Feb 29, 2020; 2:00 pm, ESPN3		at Colorado State	L 74–87	11–19 (5–13)	Moby Arena (4,862); Fort Collins, CO
Mountain West tournament
Mar 4, 2020; 1:00 pm, Stadium	(9)	vs. (8) Fresno State; First round	W 77–70	12–19	Thomas & Mack Center (5,198); Paradise, NV
March 5, 2020; 12:30 pm, CBSSN	(9)	vs. (1) No. 5 San Diego State; Quarterfinals	L 60–73	12–20	Thomas & Mack Center (8,189); Paradise, NV
*Non-conference game. ^{#}Rankings from AP Poll. (#) Tournament seedings in parentheses. All times are in Mountain Time.
