= 2019–20 NCAA Division I men's basketball season =

Basketball season

- Preseason AP No. 1: Michigan State Spartans
- Regular season: November 5, 2019 – March 15, 2020 (Note: Season prematurely ended on March 12, 2020 after sporting events had been canceled due to the COVID-19 pandemic.)
- NCAA Tournament: 2020
- Tournament dates: March 17 – April 6, 2020 (canceled)
- National Championship: Mercedes-Benz Stadium; Atlanta, Georgia
- NCAA Champions: Not awarded
- Other champions: Not awarded (NIT), Not awarded (CBI), Not awarded (CIT)
- Player of the Year (Naismith, Wooden): Obi Toppin, Dayton Flyers

The 2019–20 NCAA Division I men's basketball season began on November 5, 2019. The first tournament was the 2K Sports Classic and the season concluded prematurely on March 12, 2020. The 2020 NCAA Division I men's basketball tournament was scheduled to end at Mercedes-Benz Stadium in Atlanta, Georgia, on April 6, 2020, but was ultimately canceled. All other postseason tournaments were canceled as well. Practices officially began in late September.

On March 12, 2020, the NCAA announced that all remaining winter and spring championships for both men's and women's sports were canceled due to the COVID-19 pandemic. It was the first cancellation in the NCAA Division I men's basketball tournament history. The NCAA did not name an official national champion after the tournament was canceled.

Kansas finished first in both major polls but has not claimed a national championship for the season.

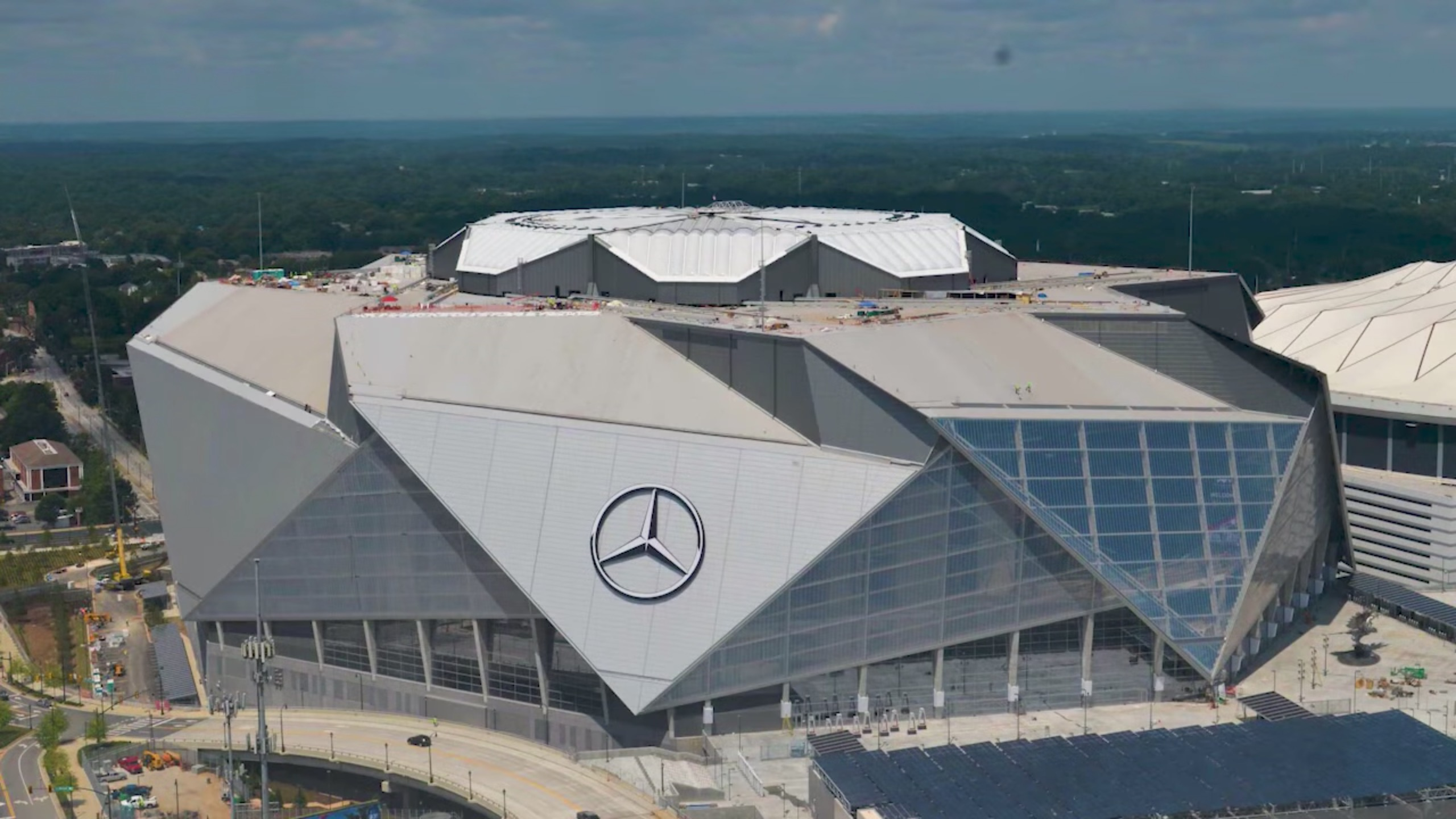
Mercedes-Benz Stadium in Atlanta, Georgia, was planned to host the NCAA men's Final Four.

== Rule changes ==
On June 5, 2019, the NCAA announced that its Playing Rules Oversight Panel had approved a suite of rules changes that its Men's Basketball Rules Committee had recommended the previous month. These changes took effect in 2019–20 for all NCAA divisions, with one exception.

- The three-point line was moved from its prior distance of 20 feet 9 inches (6.32 m) from the center of the basket to the FIBA standard of 6.75 meters (22 ft 2 in). The NCAA published diagrams on June 17, 2019 reflecting the new three-point line, including its distance from the sidelines near the corners of the court. In the corners, the three-point line is exactly 40 1/8 inches (102 cm) from the sidelines, resulting in the shortest three-point distance being essentially identical to the FIBA standard of 6.6 meters (21 ft 8 in). This change took immediate effect in Division I, but was delayed to 2020–21 for Divisions II and III.
- On offensive rebounds in the frontcourt, the shot clock is now reset to 20 seconds instead of the full 30.
- Any derogatory on-court comments regarding a player's race, ethnicity, religion, gender, sexual orientation or disability result in a flagrant-2 technical foul and automatic ejection.
- Two new rules apply during the last two minutes of regulation and the last two minutes of any overtime period:
  - Coaches are allowed to call live-ball timeouts. Previously, coaches were prohibited from calling live-ball timeouts at any time.
  - The list of calls that can be reviewed via instant replay expanded to include basket interference and goaltending.

== Season headlines ==
- May 9, 2019 – The NCAA announced its Academic Progress Rate (APR) sanctions for the 2019–20 school year. A total of nine programs in eight sports were declared ineligible for postseason play due to failure to meet the required APR benchmark, including the following Division I men's basketball team:
  - Detroit Mercy
- June 3, 2019 – The Sun Belt Conference, which a year earlier had announced a series of radical changes in its men's basketball scheduling format that would have taken effect with the 2019–20 season, announced that it had placed those changes on hold. The Sun Belt will proceed with one element of the plan, namely an expansion of the conference schedule to 20 games. In its announcement, the conference noted that the original plan had been based on data related to the RPI, an NCAA tournament selection metric that had been replaced by the significantly different NET effective with the 2019 tournament.
- June 18 – The ASUN Conference officially announced that Bellarmine University, currently a member of the NCAA Division II Great Lakes Valley Conference, would move to Division I and join the ASUN effective with the 2020–21 school year.
- June 20 – The Summit League announced that the University of Missouri–Kansas City would return to the conference on July 1, 2020 after seven years in the Western Athletic Conference.
- June 21 – The Boston-area sports news website Digital Sports Desk reported that the University of Connecticut (UConn) was expected to announce by the end of the month that it would leave the American Athletic Conference to rejoin many of its former conference mates in the Big East Conference in 2020. The story was picked up by multiple national media outlets the next day.
- June 27 – The Big East and UConn jointly announced that the school would join the Big East; though the official announcements did not specify a time, it was expected that the Huskies would become members in 2020.
- July 15 – Binghamton rising sophomore forward Calistus Anyichie drowned in an incident at Buttermilk Falls State Park near Ithaca, New York. The incident was being investigated as an accident.
- July 26 – Multiple media reports indicated that UConn and The American had reached a buyout agreement that will lead to UConn joining the Big East in July 2020. The exit fee was reportedly $17 million.
- August 5
  - The NCAA issued a set of rules that outlined new certification requirements for agents who sought to represent college underclassmen who declare themselves eligible for the NBA draft but wish to maintain college eligibility while evaluating their draft prospects. The new requirements were that the agents hold a bachelor's degree; have been certified by the NBA players' union, the National Basketball Players Association (NBPA), for at least three years; hold professional liability insurance; and pass an in-person exam administered each November at the NCAA headquarters in Indianapolis. The bachelor's degree requirement was immediately dubbed the "Rich Paul Rule", as it was widely viewed as preventing Paul, who represents LeBron James, Anthony Davis, Ben Simmons, and Draymond Green, among others, from representing underclassmen because he does not have a bachelor's degree.
  - The Horizon League announced that Purdue University Fort Wayne would leave the Summit League to join the Horizon League in July 2020.
- August 12 – After widespread criticism by media and NBA players, the NCAA amended the so-called "Rich Paul Rule" regarding agent certification. Agents such as Paul who do not hold bachelor's degrees but meet all other NCAA requirements will be allowed to represent underclassmen if they are in good standing with the NBPA.
- September 30
  - California governor Gavin Newsom signed the Fair Pay to Play Act into law, which upon taking effect in 2023 will prohibit public colleges and universities in the state from punishing their athletes for earning endorsement income. The bill places the state in direct conflict with the NCAA's current business model, which prohibits college athletes from receiving such income. At the time the bill was signed, several other states were proposing similar laws.
  - A group of Louisville Cardinals players who were not involved in the NCAA rules violations that caused the team to be stripped of its 2013 national title and 2012 Final Four appearance reached a confidential settlement of a lawsuit against the NCAA. One portion of the settlement was authorized to be revealed—while Louisville's team records remained vacated, all honors and statistics for these players were restored. Most notably, Luke Hancock, who was a plaintiff in the suit, was once again officially recognized as the Most Outstanding Player of the 2013 Final Four.
  - Officials at Tarleton State University, current members of the Division II Lone Star Conference, announced that the school had accepted an invitation to join the Western Athletic Conference. Full details, including the joining date, were expected to be revealed in the following days, but were delayed by more than a month.
- October 4 – Officials at the University of St. Thomas, a Minnesota school that will be expelled from its longtime athletic home of the NCAA Division III Minnesota Intercollegiate Athletic Conference (MIAC) in 2021, announced that the school had received an invitation to join the Summit League upon its MIAC departure. In order for St. Thomas to directly transition to the Summit, it must receive a waiver of an NCAA rule stating that Division III schools can only transition to Division II.
- October 22 – The Associated Press preseason All-American team was released. Michigan State guard Cassius Winston was the lone unanimous selection (65 votes). Joining him on the team were Marquette guard Markus Howard (57 votes), Louisville forward Jordan Nwora (47), Seton Hall guard Myles Powell (46), and Memphis center James Wiseman (32).
- October 29 – The NCAA board of governors voted unanimously to begin the process of changing institutional rules so that college athletes can profit from their names, images, and likenesses, while still maintaining a distinction between college and professional sports. The proposal calls for each of the three NCAA divisions to draft new rules consistent with this mandate, with a target date of January 2021.
- November 8 – The NCAA ruled incoming Memphis freshman star and preseason All-American James Wiseman ineligible because his family had received moving expenses from current head coach Penny Hardaway in 2017, a year before Hardaway was hired by the school. Despite his not having been employed by Memphis at the time, the NCAA considered Hardaway to be a Memphis booster because the former NBA star had donated large amounts to the school's athletic program more than a decade earlier. Memphis and Wiseman received an injunction to halt the NCAA's ruling from a local judge, and Wiseman played in the Tigers' season opener later that day.
- November 12 – The Western Athletic Conference officially announced Tarleton State's entry into the league effective July 1, 2020.
- November 14 – In the next major development in the Wiseman story, he dropped his lawsuit against the NCAA, and Memphis declared him ineligible and withdrew him from play. The school also announced it would seek reinstatement from the NCAA.
- January 11 - Clemson's 79-76 victory over North Carolina was the first time ever that Clemson won at Chapel Hill. Before that result, Clemson was 0-59 against North Carolina in Chapel Hill.
- January 21 – The Kansas State–Kansas game was marred by a bench-clearing brawl. In the final seconds of a game that Kansas would win 81–60, State's DaJuan Gordon went up for a layup that was blocked by Kansas' Silvio De Sousa. After the block, De Sousa stood over Gordon, leading to an altercation that escalated into a bench-clearing melee. During the brawl, De Sousa and several other players threw punches, and De Sousa held a chair above his head until it was taken from him by a Kansas assistant. Kansas did not wait for the Big 12 Conference to take action, announcing the next day that De Sousa would be suspended indefinitely, pending the Big 12 review of the incident.
- January 22 – The Big 12 issued suspensions for four players involved in the previous night's Kansas State–Kansas brawl. De Sousa drew the longest suspension at 12 games. Kansas teammate David McCormack was suspended for 2 games, while Kansas State's James Love and Antonio Gordon were respectively banned for 8 and 3 games.
- February 7 – The Big South Conference officially announced that North Carolina A&T State University would leave its longtime home of the Mid-Eastern Athletic Conference for the Big South effective with the 2021–22 school year.
- February 18 – The NCAA announced that it was considering a proposal that would allow student-athletes in all sports a one-time waiver to transfer to a new school without having to sit out a season. This would place all NCAA sports under the same transfer rules; currently, first-time transfers are only required to sit out a season in baseball, men's and women's basketball, football, and men's ice hockey. The existing criteria for the waiver would be extended to these five sports—namely, a player must receive a transfer release from his or her previous school, leave that school academically eligible, maintain academic progress at the new school, and not be under any disciplinary suspension.
- Responses to the COVID-19 pandemic:
  - March 10
    - The Big West Conference announced that its men's and women's conference tournaments, with women's play starting on March 10 at Walter Pyramid at California State University, Long Beach and men's play starting on March 12 at the Honda Center in Anaheim, California, would be closed to spectators.
    - The Ivy League canceled its 2020 men's and women's conference tournaments, both originally scheduled for March 14 and 15 at the Lavietes Pavilion on the campus of Harvard University. Regular-season champion Yale was named the Ivy League's automatic qualifier for the NCAA men's tournament.
    - The Mid-American Conference did not initially cancel its men's and women's tournaments, which had begun on March 9 with first-round games at campus sites, but announced that the remainder of both tournaments, to be held at Rocket Mortgage FieldHouse in Cleveland from March 11–14, would be held under what it called a "restricted attendance policy". The only individuals allowed to attend games will be credentialed institutional personnel, credentialed media and broadcast crews, team party members, and family members of players. The conference would later cancel its tournament on March 12 (see below).
  - March 11
    - The NCAA announced that both the men's and women's entire NCAA Tournaments would be conducted with "only essential staff and limited family attendance"
    - The Gazelle Group, organizer of the College Basketball Invitational, canceled the 2020 CBI. The company stated that it intends to resume the event in 2021.
  - March 12
    - All Division I conference tournaments that had yet to be completed were canceled, even those in progress.
    - Some schools—most notably Duke and Kansas—suspended all athletic travel indefinitely. Both the Blue Devils and the presumptive top overall seed Jayhawks had been expected to decline NCAA tournament bids before the cancellation of the tournament.
    - The NCAA announced that all remaining winter and spring championships would be canceled for both men's and women's sports in all divisions. It is the first cancellation in the history of the NCAA Division I men's basketball tournament.
  - March 13
    - The Florida Senate passed a resolution declaring Florida State national champions for the 2019–2020 season. The resolution, introduced by Republican Joe Gruters, passed by a vote of 37–2.
  - March 16
    - The NCAA recognizes the 1943 research of the Helms Athletic Foundation that ranked teams each season prior to the 1939 founding of the NCAA men's basketball tournament. In college football, which the NCAA does not sanction an official championship tournament in the FBS subdivision, teams that finished first in final polls were declared the mythical national championship winner, and the NCAA lists in that sport the teams ranked as the best by various selectors. The AP Poll and Coaches Poll are both recognized in football that way. Kansas finishes first in the final Coaches Poll standings.
  - March 18
    - Kansas finishes first in the final AP Poll, the other major wire service poll that in college football was declared a selector for the national championship, effectively naming a consensus national championship.

=== Milestones and records ===
- During the season, the following players reached the 2,000 career point milestone – Hampton guard Jermaine Marrow, Marquette guard Markus Howard, College of Charleston guard Grant Riller, Howard swingman Charles Williams, Seton Hall guard Myles Powell, Oregon State forward Tres Tinkle, Weber State guard Jerrick Harding, VCU guard Marcus Evans, Northern Illinois guard Eugene German, Penn State forward Lamar Stevens, William & Mary forward-center Nathan Knight, Utah State guard Sam Merrill, Texas State guard Nijal Pearson, American guard Sa'eed Nelson, LIU swingman Raiquan Clark, BYU forward Yoeli Childs, Saint Francis (PA) guard Keith Braxton, and UTSA guard Jhivvan Jackson.
  - Childs and Braxton also joined the 2,000 point and 1,000 rebound club. Childs was the first in his program's history to do so while Braxton became the first from the Northeast Conference.
- November 5 – Colorado State center Nico Carvacho became the Mountain West Conference all-time leading rebounder, grabbing 11 in a win over Denver. He surpassed Jordan Caroline's 958 career mark.
- November 8 – Utah defeated Mississippi Valley State 143–49 to set an NCAA record for largest margin of victory (94 points) over a Division I opponent.
- December 1 – Cameron Parker of Sacred Heart had 24 assists in the Pioneers' 101–57 win over NCAA Division III school Pine Manor, setting a new record for single-game assists by a Division I men's player. He also became the first player in at least the past 20 seasons to record 20 or more assists in a game while failing to score. The previous D-I record of 22 assists had been accomplished four times, most recently by Trae Young of Oklahoma in 2017.
- January 17 – Michigan State's Cassius Winston became the Big Ten's all-time assist leader, passing fellow Spartan Mateen Cleaves' career mark of 816 in a win over Wisconsin.
- February 4 — Boise State's Justinian Jessup broke the Mountain West Conference record for career three-pointers when he passed BYU's Jimmer Fredette's mark of 296.
- February 8 — Quinton Rose of Temple scored 25 points in an overtime win over SMU, becoming the all-time leading scorer for the American Athletic Conference. He passed Rob Gray of Houston's mark of 1,710 career points, set in 2018.
- February 13 — Markus Howard of Marquette became the Big East's all-time leading scorer, passing Lawrence Moten of Syracuse's mark of 1,405 points in conference play. On February 23, Howard also became the Big East's all-time leading scorer in all games, surpassing the 2,632 points of Troy Bell of Boston College. (Note: Unlike the vast majority of NCAA Division I conferences, the Big East classifies its career scoring leaders strictly by performance in regular-season conference games. Bell had been the conference's all-time scoring leader when all games were considered.)
- February 27 – Merrimack defeated Central Connecticut 69–58 to clinch at least a share of the Northeast Conference regular-season title. The Warriors became the first men's basketball team to record a 20-win season in its first Division I season. Due to NCAA rules for schools transitioning to D-I, the Warriors are ineligible to play in NCAA-sponsored postseason events (the NCAA Tournament and the NIT), and under NEC rules are ineligible for the conference tournament. Two days later, Robert Morris' 78–68 win over Saint Francis (PA) gave the Warriors the outright regular-season NEC title, making them the first men's basketball program to win an outright conference title in its first D-I season. Contrary to an Associated Press report, the Warriors are eligible for non-NCAA postseason events.
- March 2 – McNeese State's Dru Kuxhausen broke the Southland Conference and McNeese records for the most three-pointers made in a single season (120)

== Conference membership changes ==
Two schools joined new conferences for the 2019–20 season. Both moved between Division I and Division II, with one joining Division I and the other leaving Division I.

School	Former conference	New conference
Merrimack	Northeast-10 Conference (D-II)	Northeast Conference
Savannah State	Mid-Eastern Athletic Conference	Southern Intercollegiate Athletic Conference (D-II)

In addition, two existing Division I teams assumed new athletic identities.

After the 2018–19 school year, Long Island University (LIU) merged the athletic programs of its two main campuses—the Division I LIU Brooklyn Blackbirds and Division II LIU Post Pioneers—into a single program that now plays as the LIU Sharks. The Sharks inherited the Division I and Northeast Conference memberships of the Brooklyn campus, with some sports to be based in Brooklyn and others at the Post campus in Brookville, New York. Specific to basketball, LIU announced that the unified men's and women's teams in that sport would be based in Brooklyn.

On July 1, 2019, the University of Missouri–Kansas City (UMKC) announced that its athletic program, formerly known as the UMKC Kangaroos, would officially become the Kansas City Roos, with "Roos" having long been used as a short form of the former "Kangaroos" nickname.

== Arenas ==
=== New arenas ===
- Robert Morris moved into the new UPMC Events Center after playing last season at the Student Recreation and Fitness Center, a facility at the school's North Athletic Complex. The Colonials played their first game there on November 12, 2019 however the Colonials lost their first game in the new arena losing to crosstown rival Pitt 71–57.

=== Arenas closing ===
- James Madison played its final season at the JMU Convocation Center, home to the Dukes since 1982. The final game at the arena was a women's game on February 29 in which the Dukes defeated Delaware 69–64. JMU opened Atlantic Union Bank Center for the 2020–21 season.
- This was Liberty's final season playing games full-time at the Vines Center, home to the Flames since 1990. The school opened the adjoining Liberty Arena, with less than half of the capacity at Vines Center, for the 2020–21 season. The Vines Center will continue to be used for games in which attendance is expected to exceed 4,000.
- This was intended to be High Point's final season at the Millis Athletic Convocation Center, home to the Panthers since 1992. They planned to open the new Nido Quebin Arena and Conference Center for the 2020–21 season. However, construction delays brought on by COVID-19 led High Point to delay the new arena's opening until 2021–22.

=== Arena name change ===
The CFE Arena in Orlando, Florida, the home arena of the UCF Knights, was renamed the Addition Financial Arena, effective May 1, 2019. This is due to CFE Federal Credit Union rebranding to Addition Financial.

=== Temporary arenas ===
- Immediately after the 2018–19 season, Duquesne began an extensive renovation of the on-campus Palumbo Center. When the venue reopens, expected for the 2020–21 school year, it will be renamed UPMC Cooper Fieldhouse, via a partnership between the University of Pittsburgh Medical Center and the family foundation of late Duquesne star Chuck Cooper, the first African American selected in an NBA draft. At the time of announcement, the final capacity of the renovated venue had not been determined, but Duquesne's athletic director expected it to have about the same capacity as the pre-renovation Palumbo Center (4,390). Duquesne split its home games between three venues in 2019–20: PPG Paints Arena, La Roche University's Kerr Fitness Center, and Robert Morris University's new UPMC Events Center.

== Season outlook ==
=== Pre-season polls ===
The top 25 from the AP and USA Today Coaches Polls.

AP
Ranking	Team
1	Michigan State (60)
2	Kentucky (2)
3	Kansas (3)
4	Duke
5	Louisville
6	Florida
7	Maryland
8	Gonzaga
9	North Carolina
10	Villanova
11	Virginia
12	Seton Hall
13	Texas Tech
14	Memphis
15	Oregon
16	Baylor
17	Utah State
18	Ohio State
19	Xavier
20	Saint Mary's
21	Arizona
22	LSU
23	Purdue
24	Auburn
25	VCU

USA Today Coaches
Ranking	Team
1	Michigan State (30)
2	Kentucky
3	Kansas (1)
4	Duke (1)
5	Louisville
6	Florida
7	Gonzaga
8	Maryland
9	Virginia
10	Villanova
11	North Carolina
12	Texas Tech
13	Seton Hall
14	Oregon
15	Memphis
16	Ohio State
17	Arizona
18	Baylor
19	Utah State
20	Saint Mary's
21	Xavier
22	Purdue
23	Auburn
24	LSU
25	Tennessee

== Regular season ==
=== Early season tournaments ===
Names	Dates	Location	No. teams	champion
2K Empire Classic	November 21–23	Madison Square Garden (Manhattan, New York)	4	Duke
Charleston Classic	November 21–24	TD Arena (Charleston, SC)	8	Florida
Junkanoo Jam	November 21–24	Gateway Gym (Bimini, Bahamas)	4	Duquesne
Myrtle Beach Invitational	November 21–22, 24	HTC Center (Conway, SC)	8	Baylor
Hall of Fame Tip Off	November 23–24	Mohegan Sun Arena (Uncasville, CT)	4	Virginia (Naismith) Rider (Springfield)
The Islands of the Bahamas Showcase	November 23–25	Kendall Issacs National Gymnasium (Nassau, BH)	8	Liberty
Jersey Mike's Jamaica Classic	November 23–25	Montego Bay Convention Center (Montego Bay, Jamaica)	8	Utah State
Paradise Jam tournament	November 23–26	Sports and Fitness Center (Saint Thomas, VI)	8	Nevada
MGM Resorts Main Event	November 24, 26	T-Mobile Arena (Las Vegas, NV)	8	Colorado
CBE Hall of Fame Classic	November 26–27	Sprint Center (Kansas City, MO)	4	Butler
Legends Classic	November 26–27	Barclays Center (Brooklyn, NY)	4	Auburn
Cayman Islands Classic	November 25–27	John Gray Gymnasium (George Town, Cayman Islands)	8	George Mason
Gulf Coast Showcase	November 25–27	Hertz Arena (Estero, FL)	8	La Salle
Maui Invitational	November 25–27	Lahaina Civic Center (Lahaina, HI)	8	Kansas
Cancún Challenge	November 26–27	Moon Palace Golf & Spa Resort (Cancún, MX)	8	West Virginia (Riviera Division) Northern Iowa (Mayan Division)
Battle 4 Atlantis	November 27–29	Imperial Arena (Nassau, BAH)	8	Michigan
NIT Season Tip-Off	November 27, 29	Barclays Center (Brooklyn, NY)	4	Oklahoma State
Las Vegas Invitational	November 28–29	Orleans Arena (Las Vegas Valley, NV)	4	San Diego State
Orlando Invitational	November 28 – December 1	HP Field House (Lake Buena Vista, FL)	8	Maryland
Wooden Legacy	November 28 – December 1	Anaheim Convention Center (Anaheim, CA)	8	Arizona
Barclays Center Classic	November 29–30	Barclays Center (Brooklyn, NY)	2	Memphis
Emerald Coast Classic	November 29–30	The Arena at NFSC (Niceville, FL)	4	Florida State Chattanooga
Battle At the Boardwalk Classic	December 20–21	Boardwalk Hall (Atlantic City, NJ)	4	Drexel
Diamond Head Classic	December 22–23, 25	Stan Sheriff Center; Honolulu, HI	8	Houston

=== Upsets ===
An upset is a victory by an underdog team. In the context of NCAA Division I Men's Basketball this generally constitutes an unranked team defeating a team currently ranked In the Top 25. This list will highlight those upsets of ranked teams by unranked teams as well as upsets of #1 teams. Rankings are from the AP poll.

Bold type indicates winning teams in "true road games"-i.e., those played on an opponent's home court (including secondary homes, such as Intrust Bank Arena for Wichita State).

Winner	Score	Loser	Date	Tournament/Event
#2 Kentucky	69–62	#1 Michigan State	November 5, 2019	Champions Classic
Washington	67–64	#16 Baylor	November 8, 2019	Armed Forces Classic
**Texas**	70–66	#23 Purdue	November 9, 2019	
**Florida State**	63–51	#6 Florida	November 10, 2019	Sunshine Showdown
**Winthrop**	61–59	#18 Saint Mary's	November 11, 2019	
**Evansville**	67–64	#1 Kentucky	November 12, 2019	
VCU	84–82	#23 LSU	November 13, 2019	
Tennessee	75–62	#20 Washington	November 16, 2019	James Naismith Classic
UConn	62–59	#15 Florida	November 17, 2019	
Georgetown	82–66	#22 Texas	November 21, 2019	2K Empire Classic
Florida	70–65	#18 Xavier	November 24, 2019	Charleston Classic
Virginia Tech	71–66	#3 Michigan State	November 25, 2019	Maui Invitational
**Stephen F. Austin**	85–83^{OT}	#1 Duke	November 26, 2019	
Michigan	73–64	#6 North Carolina	November 28, 2019	Battle 4 Atlantis
Iowa	72–61	#12 Texas Tech	November 28, 2019	Las Vegas Invitational
Michigan	82–64	#8 Gonzaga	November 29, 2019	Battle 4 Atlantis
Florida State	60–57	#17 Tennessee	November 29, 2019	Emerald Coast Classic
Purdue	59–56	#20 VCU	November 29, 2019	Emerald Coast Classic
Creighton	83–76^{OT}	#12 Texas Tech	November 29, 2019	Las Vegas Invitational
Saint Mary's	81–73	#15 Utah State	November 29, 2019	
Indiana	80–64	#17 Florida State	December 3, 2019	Big Ten–ACC Challenge
Purdue	69–40	#5 Virginia	December 4, 2019	Big Ten–ACC Challenge
Iowa State	76–66	#16 Seton Hall	December 8, 2019	Big East/Big 12 Battle
Penn State	76–69	#4 Maryland	December 10, 2019	
Texas Tech	70–57	#1 Louisville	December 10, 2019	Jimmy V Classic
**Northern Iowa**	79–76	#24 Colorado	December 10, 2019	
Illinois	71–62	#5 Michigan	December 11, 2019	
Rutgers	68–48	#22 Seton Hall	December 14, 2019	Garden State Hardwood Classic
Wake Forest	80–78	#23 Xavier	December 14, 2019	Skip Prosser Classic
**Wofford**	68–64	#17 North Carolina	December 15, 2019	
Minnesota	84–71	#3 Ohio State	December 15, 2019	
Cincinnati	78–66	#21 Tennessee	December 18, 2019	SEC/American Alliance
Utah	69–66	#6 Kentucky	December 18, 2019	Neon Hoops Showcase
Seton Hall	52–48	#7 Maryland	December 19, 2019	
#18 Villanova	56–55	#1 Kansas	December 21, 2019	Big East/Big 12 Battle
Colorado	78–76^{OT}	#13 Dayton	December 21, 2019	Chicago Legends
St. John's	70–67	#16 Arizona	December 21, 2019	Al Attles Classic
**South Carolina**	70–59	#9 Virginia	December 22, 2019	
Houston	75–71	#21 Washington	December 25, 2019	Diamond Head Classic
Colorado	74–65	#4 Oregon	January 2, 2020	
**Wisconsin**	61–57	#5 Ohio State	January 3, 2020	
**Georgia**	65–62	#9 Memphis	January 4, 2020	SEC/American Alliance
Marquette	71–60	#10 Villanova	January 4, 2020	
Rutgers	72–61	#20 Penn State	January 7, 2020	
Boston College	60–53	#18 Virginia	January 7, 2020	
Iowa	67–49	#12 Maryland	January 10, 2020	
Indiana	66–54	#11 Ohio State	January 11, 2020	
**Wisconsin**	58–49	#20 Penn State	January 11, 2020	
**Syracuse**	63–55^{OT}	#18 Virginia	January 11, 2020	
Purdue	71–42	#8 Michigan State	January 12, 2020	
Minnesota	75–67	#19 Michigan	January 12, 2020	
Oregon State	82–65	#24 Arizona	January 12, 2020	
Clemson	79–72	#3 Duke	January 14, 2020	
Wisconsin	56–54	#17 Maryland	January 14, 2020	
South Carolina	81–78	#10 Kentucky	January 15, 2020	
Georgetown	83–80	#25 Creighton	January 15, 2020	
Temple	65–53	#16 Wichita State	January 15, 2020	
Alabama	83–64	#4 Auburn	January 15, 2020	Iron Bowl of Basketball
Washington State	72–61	#8 Oregon	January 16, 2020	
Iowa	90–83	#19 Michigan	January 17, 2020	
Penn State	90–76	#21 Ohio State	January 18, 2020	
DePaul	79–66	#5 Butler	January 18, 2020	
Florida	69–47	#4 Auburn	January 18, 2020	
Kansas State	84–68	#12 West Virginia	January 18, 2020	
Arizona	75–54	#20 Colorado	January 18, 2020	
**Houston**	65–54	#16 Wichita State	January 18, 2020	
TCU	65–54	#18 Texas Tech	January 21, 2020	
Tulsa	80–40	#20 Memphis	January 22, 2020	
Indiana	67–63	#11 Michigan State	January 23, 2020	
**SMU**	74–70	#20 Memphis	January 25, 2020	
Arizona State	66–65	#22 Arizona	January 25, 2020	Rivalry
Virginia	61–56	#5 Florida State	January 28, 2020	
Texas Tech	89–81	#12 West Virginia	January 29, 2020	
UCLA	72–68	#20 Colorado	January 30, 2020	
**Xavier**	74–62	#10 Seton Hall	February 1, 2020	
**Creighton**	76–61	#8 Villanova	February 1, 2020	
Wisconsin	64–63	#14 Michigan State	February 1, 2020	
**Providence**	65–61	#16 Butler	February 1, 2020	
Michigan	69–63	#25 Rutgers	February 1, 2020	B1G Super Saturday
Tulsa	54–51	#23 Wichita State	February 1, 2020	Rivalry
Cincinnati	64–62	#21 Houston	February 1, 2020	
Stanford	70–60	#11 Oregon	February 1, 2020	
Purdue	104–68	#17 Iowa	February 5, 2020	
Providence	73–56	#21 Creighton	February 5, 2020	
Vanderbilt	99–90	#18 LSU	February 5, 2020	
Michigan	77–68	#16 Michigan State	February 8, 2020	Rivalry
Oklahoma	69–59	#13 West Virginia	February 8, 2020	
**UCLA**	65–52	#23 Arizona	February 8, 2020	
Oregon State	63–53	#14 Oregon	February 8, 2020	Civil War
Marquette	76–57	#19 Butler	February 9, 2020	
**Michigan State**	70–69	#22 Illinois	February 11, 2020	
Georgia Tech	64–58	#5 Louisville	February 12, 2020	
Indiana	89–77	#21 Iowa	February 13, 2020	
Oklahoma State	73–70	#24 Texas Tech	February 15, 2020	
**Georgetown**	73–66	#19 Butler	February 15, 2020	
Clemson	77–62	#5 Louisville	February 15, 2020	
Alabama	88–82	#25 LSU	February 15, 2020	
Rutgers	72–57	#22 Illinois	February 15, 2020	
Missouri	85–73	#11 Auburn	February 15, 2020	
SMU	73–72^{OT}	#20 Houston	February 15, 2020	Rivalry
Providence	74–71	#10 Seton Hall	February 15, 2020	
**Illinois**	62–56	#9 Penn State	February 18, 2020	
Georgia	65–55	#13 Auburn	February 19, 2020	
NC State	88–66	#6 Duke	February 19, 2020	Tobacco Road
Arizona State	77–72	#14 Oregon	February 20, 2020	
**#3 Kansas**	64–61	#1 Baylor	February 22, 2020	
Providence	84–72	#19 Marquette	February 22, 2020	
Memphis	60–59	#22 Houston	February 22, 2020	
TCU	67–60^{OT}	#17 West Virginia	February 22, 2020	
**UCLA**	70–63	#18 Colorado	February 22, 2020	
**UNLV**	66–63	#4 San Diego State	February 22, 2020	
Indiana	68–60	#9 Penn State	February 23, 2020	
Texas	67–57	#20 West Virginia	February 24, 2020	
Wake Forest	113–101^{2OT}	#7 Duke	February 25, 2020	Tobacco Road
Oklahoma	65–51	#22 Texas Tech	February 25, 2020	
**Wisconsin**	81–74	#19 Michigan	February 27, 2020	
California	76–62	#21 Colorado	February 27, 2020	
**Texas**	68–58	#22 Texas Tech	February 29, 2020	
**Providence**	58–54	#12 Villanova	February 29, 2020	
Clemson	70–69	#6 Florida State	February 29, 2020	
TCU	75–72	#2 Baylor	February 29, 2020	
**Oklahoma**	73–62	#20 West Virginia	February 29, 2020	
Virginia	52–50	#7 Duke	February 29, 2020	
St. John's	91–71	#10 Creighton	March 1, 2020	
Stanford	72–64	#21 Colorado	March 1, 2020	
Rutgers	78–67	#9 Maryland	March 3, 2020	
**Tennessee**	81–73	#6 Kentucky	March 3, 2020	
**Purdue**	77–68	#18 Iowa	March 3, 2020	
**Texas A&M**	78–75	#17 Auburn	March 4, 2020	
UConn	77–71	#21 Houston	March 5, 2020	
West Virginia	76–64	#4 Baylor	March 7, 2020	
Northwestern	80–69	#20 Penn State	March 7, 2020	
Utah State	59–56	#5 San Diego State	March 7, 2020	Mountain West tournament
Saint Mary's	51–50	#14 BYU	March 9, 2020	West Coast Tournament

In addition to the above listed upsets in which an unranked team defeated a ranked team, there were six non-Division I teams to defeat a Division I team this season. Bold type indicates winning teams in "true road games"—i.e., those played on an opponent's home court (including secondary homes).

Winner	Score	Loser	Date
**Washington Adventist** (NAIA)	71–68	Howard	November 5, 2019
**Davenport** (Division II)	82–73	Grand Canyon	November 5, 2019
**Montana Tech** (NAIA)	74–72	Montana	November 18, 2019
Caldwell (Division II)	64–54	Norfolk State	November 26, 2019
**UMass Boston** (Division III)	69–66^{OT}	Holy Cross	December 10, 2019
**Washington Adventist** (NAIA)	78–76	Delaware State	December 30, 2019

=== Conference winners and tournaments ===
Each of the 32 Division I athletic conferences ends its regular season with a single-elimination tournament. The team with the best regular-season record in each conference is given the number one seed in each tournament, with tiebreakers used as needed in the case of ties for the top seeding. The winners of these tournaments receive automatic invitations to the 2020 NCAA Division I men's basketball tournament.

Conference	Regular season first place	Conference player of the year	Conference coach of the Year	Conference tournament	Tournament venue (city)	Tournament winner
America East Conference	Vermont	Anthony Lamb, Vermont	John Becker, Vermont	2020 America East men's basketball tournament	Campus sites	Tournament canceled due to the COVID-19 pandemic
American Athletic Conference	Cincinnati, (Note: Top seed in conference tournament.) Houston and Tulsa	Precious Achiuwa, Memphis	Frank Haith, Tulsa	2020 American Athletic Conference men's basketball tournament	Dickies Arena (Fort Worth, TX)	Tournament canceled due to the COVID-19 pandemic
Atlantic 10 Conference	Dayton	Obi Toppin, Dayton	Anthony Grant, Dayton	2020 Atlantic 10 men's basketball tournament	Barclays Center (Brooklyn, NY)	Tournament canceled due to the COVID-19 pandemic
Atlantic Coast Conference	Florida State	Tre Jones, Duke	Leonard Hamilton, Florida State	2020 ACC men's basketball tournament	Greensboro Coliseum (Greensboro, NC)	Tournament canceled due to the COVID-19 pandemic
Atlantic Sun Conference	Liberty and North Florida	Caleb Homesley, Liberty	Matthew Driscoll, North Florida & Ritchie McKay, Liberty	2020 ASUN men's basketball tournament	Campus sites	Liberty
Big 12 Conference	Kansas	Udoka Azubuike, Kansas	Scott Drew, Baylor	2020 Big 12 men's basketball tournament	Sprint Center (Kansas City, MO)	Tournament canceled due to the COVID-19 pandemic
Big East Conference	Creighton, Villanova and Seton Hall	Myles Powell, Seton Hall	Greg McDermott, Creighton	2020 Big East men's basketball tournament	Madison Square Garden (New York City, NY)	Tournament canceled due to the COVID-19 pandemic
Big Sky Conference	Eastern Washington	Mason Peatling, Eastern Washington	Shantay Legans, Eastern Washington	2020 Big Sky Conference men's basketball tournament	CenturyLink Arena (Boise, ID)	Tournament canceled due to the COVID-19 pandemic
Big South Conference	Radford and Winthrop	Carlik Jones, Radford	Mike Jones, Radford	2020 Big South Conference men's basketball tournament	First round: Campus sites Quarterfinals/semifinals: #1 seed Final: Top surviving seed	Winthrop
Big Ten Conference	Maryland, Michigan State and Wisconsin	Luka Garza, Iowa	Greg Gard, Wisconsin	2020 Big Ten Conference men's basketball tournament	Bankers Life Fieldhouse (Indianapolis, IN)	Tournament canceled due to the COVID-19 pandemic
Big West Conference	UC Irvine	Lamine Diane, Cal State Northridge	Russell Turner, UC Irvine	2020 Big West Conference men's basketball tournament	Honda Center (Anaheim, CA)	Tournament canceled due to the COVID-19 pandemic
Colonial Athletic Association	Hofstra	Nathan Knight, William & Mary	Dane Fischer, William & Mary	2020 CAA men's basketball tournament	Entertainment and Sports Arena (Washington, DC)	Hofstra
Conference USA	North Texas	Javion Hamlet, North Texas	Grant McCasland, North Texas	2020 Conference USA men's basketball tournament	Ford Center (Frisco, TX)	Tournament canceled due to the COVID-19 pandemic
Horizon League	Wright State	Loudon Love, Wright State	Dennis Gates, Cleveland State & Scott Nagy, Wright State	2020 Horizon League men's basketball tournament	First Round and Quarterfinals: Campus sites Semifinals and final: Indiana Farmers Coliseum (Indianapolis, IN)	Northern Kentucky
Ivy League	Yale	Paul Atkinson, Yale & A. J. Brodeur, Penn	James Jones, Yale	2020 Ivy League men's basketball tournament	Lavietes Pavilion (Boston, MA)	Tournament canceled due to the COVID-19 pandemic
Metro Atlantic Athletic Conference	Siena	Jalen Pickett, Siena	Shaheen Holloway, Saint Peter's	2020 MAAC men's basketball tournament	Boardwalk Hall (Atlantic City, NJ)	Tournament canceled due to the COVID-19 pandemic
Mid-American Conference	Akron (East); Ball State & Northern Illinois (West)	Loren Cristian Jackson, Akron	John Groce, Akron	2020 Mid-American Conference men's basketball tournament	First round: Campus sites Remainder: Rocket Mortgage FieldHouse (Cleveland, OH)	Tournament canceled due to the COVID-19 pandemic
Mid-Eastern Athletic Conference	North Carolina Central	Jibri Blount, North Carolina Central	Willie Jones, North Carolina A&T	2020 MEAC men's basketball tournament	Norfolk Scope (Norfolk, VA)	Tournament canceled due to the COVID-19 pandemic
Missouri Valley Conference	Northern Iowa	A. J. Green, Northern Iowa	Ben Jacobson, Northern Iowa	2020 Missouri Valley Conference men's basketball tournament	Enterprise Center (St. Louis, MO)	Bradley
Mountain West Conference	San Diego State	Malachi Flynn, San Diego State	Brian Dutcher, San Diego State	2020 Mountain West Conference men's basketball tournament	Thomas & Mack Center (Paradise, NV)	Utah State
Northeast Conference	Merrimack (Note: Ineligible for the NEC tournament due to transition from NCAA Division II.)	Isaiah Blackmon, Saint Francis (PA)	Joe Gallo, Merrimack	2020 Northeast Conference men's basketball tournament	Campus sites	Robert Morris
Ohio Valley Conference	Belmont and Murray State	Terry Taylor, Austin Peay	A. W. Hamilton, Eastern Kentucky	2020 Ohio Valley Conference men's basketball tournament	Ford Center (Evansville, IN)	Belmont
Pac-12 Conference	Oregon	Payton Pritchard, Oregon	Mick Cronin, UCLA	2020 Pac-12 Conference men's basketball tournament	T-Mobile Arena (Paradise, NV)	Tournament canceled due to the COVID-19 pandemic
Patriot League	Colgate	Sa'eed Nelson, American	Matt Langel, Colgate	2020 Patriot League men's basketball tournament	Campus sites	Boston University
Southeastern Conference	Kentucky	Immanuel Quickley, Kentucky (Coaches), Mason Jones, Arkansas & Reggie Perry, Mississippi State (AP)	John Calipari, Kentucky (Coaches); Buzz Williams, Texas A&M (AP)	2020 SEC men's basketball tournament	Bridgestone Arena (Nashville, TN)	Tournament canceled due to the COVID-19 pandemic
Southern Conference	East Tennessee State	Isaiah Miller, UNC Greensboro	Steve Forbes, East Tennessee State	2020 Southern Conference men's basketball tournament	Harrah's Cherokee Center (Asheville, NC)	East Tennessee State
Southland Conference	Stephen F. Austin	Kevon Harris, Stephen F. Austin	Kyle Keller, Stephen F. Austin	2020 Southland Conference men's basketball tournament	Leonard E. Merrell Center (Katy, TX)	Tournament canceled due to the COVID-19 pandemic
Southwestern Athletic Conference	Prairie View A&M	Devonte Patterson, Prairie View A&M	Byron Smith, Prairie View A&M	2020 SWAC men's basketball tournament	Quarterfinals: Campus sites Semifinals and final: Bartow Arena (Birmingham, AL)	Tournament canceled due to the COVID-19 pandemic
Summit League	North Dakota State and South Dakota State	Douglas Wilson, South Dakota State	Eric Henderson, South Dakota State	2020 Summit League men's basketball tournament	Denny Sanford Premier Center (Sioux Falls, SD)	North Dakota State
Sun Belt Conference	Little Rock	Nijal Pearson, Texas State	Darrell Walker, Little Rock	2020 Sun Belt Conference men's basketball tournament	First three rounds: Campus sites Semifinals and final: Smoothie King Center (New Orleans, LA)	Tournament canceled due to the COVID-19 pandemic
West Coast Conference	Gonzaga	Filip Petrušev, Gonzaga	Damon Stoudamire, Pacific	2020 West Coast Conference men's basketball tournament	Orleans Arena (Paradise, NV)	Gonzaga
Western Athletic Conference	New Mexico State	Milan Acquaah, California Baptist	Chris Jans, New Mexico State	2020 WAC men's basketball tournament	Orleans Arena (Paradise, NV)	Tournament canceled due to the COVID-19 pandemic

=== Statistical leaders ===
Source for additional stats categories

**Points per game**			**Rebounds per game**			**Assists per game**			**Steals per game**		
Player	School	PPG	Player	School	RPG	Player	School	APG	Player	School	SPG
Markus Howard	Marquette	27.8	Kevin Marfo	Quinnipiac	13.3	Kameron Langley	North Carolina A&T	8.0	Jacob Gilyard	Richmond	3.2
Jhivvan Jackson	UTSA	26.8	John Mooney	Notre Dame	12.7	Javon Levi	UTRGV	7.9	Fatts Russell	Rhode Island	2.9
Jermaine Marrow	Hampton	24.8	Willie Jackson	Toledo	12.0	Zavier Simpson	Michigan	7.9	Sa'eed Nelson	American	2.8
Antoine Davis	Detroit Mercy	24.3	Cletrell Pope	Bethune–Cookman	11.9	Jason Preston	Ohio	7.4	Isaiah Miller	UNC Greensboro	2.8
Luka Garza	Iowa	23.9	James Butler	Drexel	11.7	Josh Sharkey	Samford	7.2	Josh Sharkey	Samford	2.7

**Blocked shots per game**			**Field goal percentage**			**Three-point field goal percentage**			**Free throw percentage**		
Player	School	BPG	Player	School	FG%	Player	School	3FG%	Player	School	FT%
Osasumwen Osaghae	FIU	3.81	Udoka Azubuike	Kansas	.748	Stefan Gonzalez	UC Davis	.477	Terrell Gomez	Cal State Northridge	.948
Kylor Kelley	Oregon St.	3.45	Shamarkus Kennedy	McNeese St.	.679	Jake Toolson	BYU	.470	Nathan Hoover	Wofford	.930
Romaro Gill	Seton Hall	3.17	Osasumwen Osaghae	FIU	.671	Dru Kuxhausen	McNeese St.	.458	Immanuel Quickley	Kentucky	.923
Hayden Koval	C. Arkansas	3.06	Nick Richards	Kentucky	.644	Saddiq Bey	Villanova	.451	AJ Green	N. Iowa	.917
Liam Robbins	Drake	2.91	Chevez Goodwin	Wofford	.640	Nate Kennell	Bradley	.447	Cameron Healy	Albany	.908

== Postseason ==
All post-season tournaments were canceled prior to completing the qualification process.

== Conference standings ==
2019–20 America East Conference men's basketball standings
	Conf.				Overall
Team	W		L	PCT	W		L	PCT
Vermont	14	–	2	.875	26	–	7	.788
Stony Brook	10	–	6	.625	20	–	13	.606
Hartford	9	–	7	.563	18	–	15	.545
UMBC	8	–	8	.500	16	–	17	.485
New Hampshire	8	–	8	.500	15	–	15	.500
UMass Lowell	7	–	9	.438	13	–	19	.406
Albany	7	–	9	.438	14	–	18	.438
Maine	5	–	11	.313	9	–	22	.290
Binghamton	4	–	12	.250	10	–	19	.345
Note: The 2020 America East tournament was cancelled prior to the championship game due to the COVID-19 pandemic.

2019–20 American Athletic Conference men's basketball standings
	Conf.				Overall
Team	W		L	PCT	W		L	PCT
Cincinnati	13	–	5	.722	20	–	10	.667
No. 22 Houston	13	–	5	.722	23	–	8	.742
Tulsa	13	–	5	.722	21	–	10	.677
Wichita State	11	–	7	.611	23	–	8	.742
UConn	10	–	8	.556	19	–	12	.613
Memphis	10	–	8	.556	21	–	10	.677
SMU	9	–	9	.500	19	–	11	.633
UCF	7	–	11	.389	16	–	14	.533
South Florida	7	–	11	.389	14	–	17	.452
Temple	6	–	12	.333	14	–	17	.452
East Carolina	5	–	13	.278	11	–	20	.355
Tulane	4	–	14	.222	12	–	18	.400
Note: The 2020 AAC tournament was canceled due to the COVID-19 pandemic. Rankings from AP poll

2019–20 Atlantic 10 men's basketball standings
	Conf.				Overall
Team	W		L	PCT	W		L	PCT
No. 3 Dayton	18	–	0	1.000	29	–	2	.935
Richmond	14	–	4	.778	24	–	7	.774
Rhode Island	13	–	5	.722	21	–	9	.700
Saint Louis	12	–	6	.667	23	–	8	.742
St. Bonaventure	11	–	7	.611	19	–	12	.613
Duquesne	11	–	7	.611	21	–	9	.700
Davidson	10	–	8	.556	16	–	14	.533
Massachusetts	8	–	10	.444	14	–	17	.452
VCU	8	–	10	.444	18	–	13	.581
La Salle	6	–	12	.333	15	–	15	.500
George Washington	6	–	12	.333	12	–	20	.375
George Mason	5	–	13	.278	17	–	15	.531
Saint Joseph's	2	–	16	.111	6	–	26	.188
Fordham	2	–	16	.111	9	–	22	.290
Note: The 2020 A-10 tournament was canceled after the first round due to the COVID-19 pandemic. Rankings from AP poll

2019–20 ACC men's basketball standings
	Conf.				Overall
Team	W		L	PCT	W		L	PCT
No. 4 Florida State	16	–	4	.800	26	–	5	.839
No. 16 Virginia	15	–	5	.750	23	–	7	.767
No. 14 Louisville	15	–	5	.750	24	–	7	.774
No. 11 Duke	15	–	5	.750	25	–	6	.806
Georgia Tech*	11	–	9	.550	17	–	14	.548
NC State	10	–	10	.500	20	–	12	.625
Syracuse	10	–	10	.500	18	–	14	.563
Notre Dame	10	–	10	.500	20	–	12	.625
Clemson	9	–	11	.450	16	–	15	.516
Miami (FL)	7	–	13	.350	15	–	16	.484
Boston College	7	–	13	.350	13	–	18	.419
Virginia Tech	7	–	13	.350	16	–	16	.500
Wake Forest	6	–	14	.300	13	–	18	.419
Pittsburgh	6	–	14	.300	16	–	17	.485
North Carolina	6	–	14	.300	14	–	19	.424
*Ineligible for postseason due to NCAA violations. Note: The 2020 ACC tournament was cancelled before the quarterfinals due to the COVID-19 pandemic. Rankings from AP poll

2019–20 ASUN men's basketball standings
	Conf.				Overall
Team	W		L	PCT	W		L	PCT
Liberty†	13	–	3	.813	30	–	4	.882
North Florida	13	–	3	.813	21	–	12	.636
Lipscomb	9	–	7	.563	16	–	16	.500
Stetson	9	–	7	.563	16	–	17	.485
North Alabama*	8	–	8	.500	13	–	17	.433
Florida Gulf Coast	7	–	9	.438	10	–	22	.313
Jacksonville	7	–	9	.438	14	–	18	.438
NJIT	6	–	10	.375	9	–	21	.300
Kennesaw State	0	–	16	.000	1	–	28	.034
† 2020 ASUN tournament winner * Ineligible for the 2020 NCAA tournament due to transition period

2019–20 Big East men's basketball standings
	Conf.				Overall
Team	W		L	PCT	W		L	PCT
No. 7 Creighton	13	–	5	.722	24	–	7	.774
No. 10 Villanova	13	–	5	.722	24	–	7	.774
No. 15 Seton Hall	13	–	5	.722	21	–	9	.700
Providence	12	–	6	.667	19	–	12	.613
No. 23 Butler	10	–	8	.556	22	–	9	.710
Marquette	8	–	10	.444	18	–	12	.600
Xavier	8	–	10	.444	19	–	13	.594
Georgetown	5	–	13	.278	15	–	17	.469
St. John's	5	–	13	.278	17	–	15	.531
DePaul	3	–	15	.167	16	–	16	.500
Note: The 2020 Big East tournament was cancelled at halftime of the first game of the quarterfinals due to the COVID-19 pandemic. Rankings from AP poll

2019–20 Big Sky men's basketball standings
	Conf.				Overall
Team	W		L	PCT	W		L	PCT
Eastern Washington	16	–	4	.800	23	–	8	.742
Northern Colorado	15	–	5	.750	22	–	9	.710
Montana	14	–	6	.700	18	–	13	.581
Portland State	12	–	8	.600	18	–	14	.563
Northern Arizona	10	–	10	.500	16	–	14	.533
Montana State	10	–	10	.500	16	–	15	.516
Southern Utah	9	–	11	.450	17	–	15	.531
Sacramento State	8	–	12	.400	16	–	14	.533
Weber State	8	–	12	.400	12	–	20	.375
Idaho State	4	–	16	.200	8	–	22	.267
Idaho	4	–	16	.200	8	–	24	.250
Note: The conference tournament was canceled prior to the quarterfinals due to the COVID-19 pandemic.

2019–20 Big South men's basketball standings
	Conf.				Overall
Team	W		L	PCT	W		L	PCT
Radford	15	–	3	.833	21	–	11	.656
Winthrop†	15	–	3	.833	24	–	10	.706
Gardner–Webb	11	–	7	.611	16	–	16	.500
Longwood	9	–	9	.500	14	–	18	.438
Hampton	8	–	10	.444	15	–	19	.441
UNC Asheville	8	–	10	.444	15	–	16	.484
USC Upstate	7	–	11	.389	13	–	20	.394
Charleston Southern	7	–	11	.389	14	–	18	.438
Presbyterian	7	–	11	.389	10	–	22	.313
High Point	6	–	12	.333	9	–	23	.281
Campbell	6	–	12	.333	15	–	16	.484
† 2020 Big South tournament winner

2019–20 Big Ten Conference men's basketball standings
	Conf.				Overall
Team	W		L	PCT	W		L	PCT
No. 17 Wisconsin	14	–	6	.700	21	–	10	.677
No. 9 Michigan State	14	–	6	.700	22	–	9	.710
No. 12 Maryland	14	–	6	.700	24	–	7	.774
No. 21 Illinois	13	–	7	.650	21	–	10	.677
No. 25 Iowa	11	–	9	.550	20	–	11	.645
Penn State	11	–	9	.550	21	–	10	.677
No. 19 Ohio State	11	–	9	.550	21	–	10	.677
Rutgers	11	–	9	.550	20	–	11	.645
Michigan	10	–	10	.500	19	–	12	.613
Purdue	9	–	11	.450	16	–	15	.516
Indiana	9	–	11	.450	20	–	12	.625
Minnesota	8	–	12	.400	15	–	16	.484
Northwestern	3	–	17	.150	8	–	23	.258
Nebraska	2	–	18	.100	7	–	25	.219
The 2020 Big Ten tournament was canceled prior to the second round due to the COVID-19 pandemic. Rankings from AP poll

2019–20 Big 12 men's basketball standings
	Conf.				Overall
Team	W		L	PCT	W		L	PCT
No. 1 Kansas	17	–	1	.944	28	–	3	.903
No. 5 Baylor	15	–	3	.833	26	–	4	.867
No. 24 West Virginia	9	–	9	.500	21	–	10	.677
Texas	9	–	9	.500	19	–	12	.613
Oklahoma	9	–	9	.500	19	–	12	.613
Texas Tech	9	–	9	.500	18	–	13	.581
TCU	7	–	11	.389	16	–	16	.500
Oklahoma State	7	–	11	.389	18	–	14	.563
Iowa State	5	–	13	.278	12	–	20	.375
Kansas State	3	–	15	.167	11	–	21	.344
Note: The 2020 Big 12 Tournament was canceled prior to the quarterfinals due to the COVID-19 pandemic. Rankings from AP poll

2019–20 Big West men's basketball standings
	Conf.				Overall
Team	W		L	PCT	W		L	PCT
UC Irvine	13	–	3	.813	21	–	11	.656
Cal State Northridge	10	–	6	.625	15	–	17	.469
UC Santa Barbara	10	–	6	.625	21	–	10	.677
Hawai'i	8	–	8	.500	17	–	13	.567
UC Davis	8	–	8	.500	14	–	18	.438
UC Riverside	7	–	9	.438	17	–	15	.531
Cal State Fullerton	6	–	10	.375	11	–	20	.355
Long Beach State	6	–	10	.375	11	–	21	.344
Cal Poly	4	–	12	.250	7	–	23	.233
Note: The 2020 Big West tournament was canceled due to the COVID-19 pandemic.

2019–20 CAA men's basketball standings
	Conf.				Overall
Team	W		L	PCT	W		L	PCT
Hofstra†	14	–	4	.778	26	–	8	.765
William & Mary	13	–	5	.722	21	–	11	.656
Towson	12	–	6	.667	19	–	13	.594
Delaware	11	–	7	.611	22	–	11	.667
Charleston	11	–	7	.611	17	–	14	.548
Northeastern	9	–	9	.500	17	–	16	.515
Elon	7	–	11	.389	13	–	21	.382
Drexel	6	–	12	.333	14	–	19	.424
UNC Wilmington	5	–	13	.278	10	–	22	.313
James Madison	2	–	16	.111	9	–	21	.300
† 2020 CAA tournament winner

2019–20 Conference USA men's basketball standings
	Conf.				Overall
Team	W		L	PCT	W		L	PCT
North Texas	14	–	4	.778	20	–	11	.645
Western Kentucky	13	–	5	.722	20	–	10	.667
Louisiana Tech	13	–	5	.722	22	–	8	.733
Charlotte	10	–	8	.556	16	–	13	.552
FIU	9	–	9	.500	19	–	13	.594
Marshall	10	–	8	.556	17	–	15	.531
UAB	9	–	9	.500	19	–	13	.594
Old Dominion	9	–	9	.500	13	–	19	.406
Florida Atlantic	8	–	10	.444	17	–	15	.531
UTSA	7	–	11	.389	13	–	19	.406
UTEP	8	–	10	.444	17	–	15	.531
Rice	7	–	11	.389	15	–	17	.469
Southern Miss	5	–	13	.278	9	–	22	.290
Middle Tennessee	4	–	14	.222	8	–	23	.258
Note: The 2020 C-USA tournament was canceled prior to the quarterfinals due to the COVID-19 pandemic.

2019–20 Horizon League men's basketball standings
	Conf.				Overall
Team	W		L	PCT	W		L	PCT
Wright State	15	–	3	.833	25	–	7	.781
Northern Kentucky †	13	–	5	.722	23	–	9	.719
Green Bay	11	–	7	.611	17	–	16	.515
Youngstown State	10	–	8	.556	18	–	15	.545
UIC	10	–	8	.556	18	–	17	.514
Oakland	8	–	10	.444	14	–	19	.424
Cleveland State	7	–	11	.389	11	–	21	.344
Milwaukee	7	–	11	.389	12	–	19	.387
Detroit Mercy*	6	–	12	.333	8	–	23	.258
IUPUI	3	–	15	.167	7	–	25	.219
† 2020 Horizon League Tournament winner * Ineligible for postseason due to APR violations

2019–20 Ivy League men's basketball standings
	Conf.				Overall
Team	W		L	PCT	W		L	PCT
x-Yale	11	–	3	.786	23	–	7	.767
Harvard	10	–	4	.714	21	–	8	.724
Princeton	9	–	5	.643	14	–	13	.519
Penn	8	–	6	.571	16	–	11	.593
Brown	8	–	6	.571	15	–	12	.556
Dartmouth	5	–	9	.357	12	–	17	.414
Cornell	4	–	10	.286	7	–	20	.259
Columbia	1	–	13	.071	6	–	24	.200
x – Ivy League champions Ivy League tournament canceled due to COVID-19 pandemic

2019–20 MAAC men's basketball standings
	Conf.				Overall
Team	W		L	PCT	W		L	PCT
Siena	15	–	5	.750	20	–	10	.667
Saint Peter's	14	–	6	.700	18	–	12	.600
Rider	12	–	8	.600	18	–	12	.600
Monmouth	12	–	8	.600	18	–	13	.581
Quinnipiac	10	–	10	.500	15	–	15	.500
Niagara	9	–	11	.450	12	–	20	.375
Iona	9	–	11	.450	12	–	16	.429
Fairfield	8	–	12	.400	12	–	20	.375
Manhattan	8	–	12	.400	13	–	17	.433
Canisius	7	–	13	.350	12	–	20	.375
Marist	6	–	14	.300	7	–	23	.233
Note: The 2020 MAAC tournament was canceled during the quarterfinals due to the COVID-19 pandemic.

2019–20 Mid-American Conference men's basketball standings
	Conf.				Overall
Team	W		L	PCT	W		L	PCT
East
Akron	14	–	4	.778	24	–	7	.774
Bowling Green	12	–	6	.667	21	–	10	.677
Buffalo	11	–	7	.611	20	–	12	.625
Kent State	9	–	9	.500	20	–	12	.625
Ohio	8	–	10	.444	17	–	15	.531
Miami (OH)	5	–	13	.278	13	–	19	.406
West
Ball State	11	–	7	.611	18	–	13	.581
Northern Illinois	11	–	7	.611	18	–	13	.581
Toledo	8	–	10	.444	17	–	15	.531
Central Michigan	7	–	11	.389	14	–	18	.438
Western Michigan	6	–	12	.333	13	–	19	.406
Eastern Michigan	6	–	12	.333	16	–	16	.500
Note: The 2020 MAC tournament was canceled prior to the quarterfinals due to the COVID-19 pandemic.

2019–20 MEAC men's basketball standings
	Conf.				Overall
Team	W		L	PCT	W		L	PCT
North Carolina Central	13	–	3	.813	18	–	13	.581
North Carolina A&T	12	–	4	.750	16	–	15	.516
Norfolk State	12	–	4	.750	16	–	15	.516
Florida A&M*	10	–	6	.625	12	–	15	.444
Bethune–Cookman	10	–	6	.625	16	–	14	.533
Morgan State	9	–	7	.563	15	–	16	.484
Coppin State	7	–	9	.438	11	–	20	.355
South Carolina State	6	–	10	.375	11	–	18	.379
MD Eastern Shore	4	–	12	.250	5	–	27	.156
Delaware State	4	–	12	.250	6	–	26	.188
Howard	1	–	15	.063	4	–	29	.121
* Ineligible for postseason due to improper certification of student-athletes Note: The 2020 MEAC tournament was canceled during the quarterfinals due to the COVID-19 pandemic.

2019–20 Missouri Valley Conference men's basketball standings
	Conf.				Overall
Team	W		L	PCT	W		L	PCT
Northern Iowa	14	–	4	.778	25	–	6	.806
Loyola Chicago	13	–	5	.722	21	–	11	.656
Indiana State	11	–	7	.611	18	–	12	.600
Bradley †	11	–	7	.611	23	–	11	.676
Southern Illinois	10	–	8	.556	16	–	16	.500
Missouri State	9	–	9	.500	16	–	17	.485
Valparaiso	9	–	9	.500	19	–	16	.543
Drake	8	–	10	.444	20	–	14	.588
Illinois State	5	–	13	.278	10	–	21	.323
Evansville	0	–	18	.000	9	–	23	.281
† 2020 MVC tournament winner

2019–20 Mountain West Conference men's basketball standings
	Conf.				Overall
Team	W		L	PCT	W		L	PCT
No. 6 San Diego State	17	–	1	.944	30	–	2	.938
Utah State †	12	–	6	.667	26	–	8	.765
Nevada	12	–	6	.667	19	–	12	.613
UNLV	12	–	6	.667	17	–	15	.531
Boise State	11	–	7	.611	20	–	12	.625
Colorado State	11	–	7	.611	20	–	12	.625
New Mexico	7	–	11	.389	19	–	14	.576
Fresno State	7	–	11	.389	11	–	19	.367
Air Force	5	–	13	.278	12	–	20	.375
San Jose State	3	–	15	.167	7	–	24	.226
Wyoming	2	–	16	.111	9	–	24	.273
† Conference tournament winner Rankings from AP poll

2019–20 Northeast Conference men's basketball standings
	Conf.				Overall
Team	W		L	PCT	W		L	PCT
Merrimack*	14	–	4	.778	20	–	11	.645
Robert Morris †	13	–	5	.722	20	–	14	.588
Saint Francis (PA)	13	–	5	.722	22	–	10	.688
Sacred Heart	12	–	6	.667	20	–	13	.606
LIU	9	–	9	.500	15	–	18	.455
Fairleigh Dickinson	9	–	9	.500	11	–	19	.367
Mount St. Mary's	7	–	11	.389	11	–	21	.344
Bryant	7	–	11	.389	15	–	17	.469
St. Francis Brooklyn	7	–	11	.389	13	–	18	.419
Wagner	5	–	13	.278	8	–	21	.276
Central Connecticut	3	–	15	.167	4	–	27	.129
† 2020 NEC tournament winner * Ineligible for NEC championship (reclassification from Division II)

2019–20 Ohio Valley Conference men's basketball standings
	Conf.				Overall
Team	W		L	PCT	W		L	PCT
Belmont †	15	–	3	.833	26	–	7	.788
Murray State	15	–	3	.833	23	–	9	.719
Austin Peay	14	–	4	.778	21	–	12	.636
Eastern Kentucky	12	–	6	.667	16	–	17	.485
Tennessee State	9	–	9	.500	18	–	15	.545
Eastern Illinois	9	–	9	.500	17	–	15	.531
Jacksonville State	8	–	10	.444	13	–	19	.406
Morehead State	7	–	11	.389	13	–	19	.406
Tennessee Tech	6	–	12	.333	9	–	22	.290
UT Martin	5	–	13	.278	9	–	20	.310
SIU Edwardsville	5	–	13	.278	8	–	23	.258
Southeast Missouri State	3	–	15	.167	7	–	24	.226
† 2020 OVC tournament winner

2019–20 Pac-12 Conference men's basketball standings
	Conf.				Overall
Team	W		L	PCT	W		L	PCT
No. 13 Oregon	13	–	5	.722	24	–	7	.774
UCLA	12	–	6	.667	19	–	12	.613
USC	11	–	7	.611	22	–	9	.710
Arizona State	11	–	7	.611	20	–	11	.645
Arizona	10	–	8	.556	21	–	11	.656
Colorado	10	–	8	.556	21	–	11	.656
Stanford	9	–	9	.500	20	–	12	.625
Oregon State	7	–	11	.389	18	–	13	.581
Utah	7	–	11	.389	16	–	15	.516
California	7	–	11	.389	14	–	18	.438
Washington State	6	–	12	.333	16	–	16	.500
Washington	5	–	13	.278	15	–	17	.469
Note: The 2020 Pac-12 Tournament was canceled prior to the quarterfinals due to the COVID-19 pandemic. Rankings from AP poll

2019–20 Patriot League men's basketball standings
	Conf.				Overall
Team	W		L	PCT	W		L	PCT
Colgate	14	–	4	.778	25	–	9	.735
American	12	–	6	.667	16	–	14	.533
Boston University †	12	–	6	.667	21	–	13	.618
Army	10	–	8	.556	15	–	15	.500
Lafayette	10	–	8	.556	19	–	12	.613
Navy	8	–	10	.444	14	–	16	.467
Bucknell	8	–	10	.444	14	–	20	.412
Lehigh	7	–	11	.389	11	–	21	.344
Loyola (MD)	7	–	11	.389	15	–	17	.469
Holy Cross	2	–	16	.111	3	–	29	.094
† 2020 Patriot League tournament winner

2019–20 Southeastern Conference men's basketball standings
	Conf.				Overall
Team	W		L	PCT	W		L	PCT
No. 8 Kentucky	15	–	3	.833	25	–	6	.806
No. 20 Auburn	12	–	6	.667	25	–	6	.806
LSU	12	–	6	.667	21	–	10	.677
Mississippi State	11	–	7	.611	20	–	11	.645
Florida	11	–	7	.611	19	–	12	.613
South Carolina	10	–	8	.556	18	–	13	.581
Texas A&M	10	–	8	.556	16	–	14	.533
Tennessee	9	–	9	.500	17	–	14	.548
Alabama	8	–	10	.444	16	–	15	.516
Arkansas	7	–	11	.389	20	–	12	.625
Missouri	7	–	11	.389	15	–	16	.484
Ole Miss	6	–	12	.333	15	–	17	.469
Georgia	5	–	13	.278	16	–	16	.500
Vanderbilt	3	–	15	.167	11	–	21	.344
Note: The 2020 SEC tournament was canceled after the first round due to the COVID-19 pandemic. Rankings from AP poll

2019–20 Southern Conference men's basketball standings
	Conf.				Overall
Team	W		L	PCT	W		L	PCT
East Tennessee State †	16	–	2	.889	30	–	4	.882
Furman	15	–	3	.833	25	–	7	.781
UNC Greensboro	13	–	5	.722	23	–	9	.719
Mercer	11	–	7	.611	17	–	15	.531
Western Carolina	10	–	8	.556	19	–	12	.613
Chattanooga	10	–	8	.556	20	–	13	.606
Wofford	8	–	10	.444	19	–	16	.543
Samford	4	–	14	.222	10	–	23	.303
VMI	3	–	15	.167	9	–	24	.273
The Citadel	0	–	18	.000	6	–	24	.200
† 2020 SoCon tournament winner

2019–20 Southland Conference men's basketball standings
	Conf.				Overall
Team	W		L	PCT	W		L	PCT
Stephen F. Austin	19	–	1	.950	28	–	3	.903
Abilene Christian	15	–	5	.750	20	–	11	.645
Nicholls	15	–	5	.750	21	–	10	.677
Sam Houston State	11	–	9	.550	18	–	13	.581
Northwestern State	11	–	9	.550	15	–	15	.500
Lamar	10	–	10	.500	17	–	15	.531
McNeese State	10	–	10	.500	15	–	17	.469
Texas A&M–CC	10	–	10	.500	14	–	18	.438
Central Arkansas	9	–	11	.450	10	–	21	.323
Incarnate Word	6	–	14	.300	9	–	22	.290
New Orleans	5	–	15	.250	9	–	21	.300
Southeastern Louisiana	5	–	15	.250	8	–	23	.258
Houston Baptist	4	–	16	.200	4	–	25	.138
Note: The 2020 SLC tournament was canceled after the first round due to the COVID-19 pandemic.

2019–20 SWAC men's basketball standings
	Conf.				Overall
Team	W		L	PCT	W		L	PCT
Prairie View A&M	14	–	4	.778	19	–	13	.594
Southern	13	–	5	.722	17	–	15	.531
Texas Southern	12	–	6	.667	16	–	16	.500
Grambling State	11	–	7	.611	17	–	15	.531
Jackson State	11	–	7	.611	15	–	17	.469
Alcorn State	11	–	7	.611	15	–	15	.500
Alabama State	7	–	11	.389	8	–	24	.250
Alabama A&M	5	–	13	.278	8	–	22	.267
Arkansas–Pine Bluff	3	–	15	.167	4	–	26	.133
Mississippi Valley State	3	–	15	.167	3	–	27	.100
Note: The 2020 SWAC tournament was canceled prior to the semifinals due to the COVID-19 pandemic.

2019–20 Summit League men's basketball standings
	Conf.				Overall
Team	W		L	PCT	W		L	PCT
North Dakota State †	13	–	3	.813	25	–	8	.758
South Dakota State	13	–	3	.813	22	–	10	.688
South Dakota	10	–	6	.625	20	–	12	.625
Oral Roberts	9	–	7	.563	17	–	14	.548
Omaha	9	–	7	.563	16	–	16	.500
North Dakota	7	–	9	.438	15	–	18	.455
Purdue Fort Wayne	6	–	10	.375	14	–	19	.424
Denver	3	–	13	.188	7	–	24	.226
Western Illinois	2	–	14	.125	5	–	21	.192
† 2020 Summit League Tournament winner

2019–20 Sun Belt Conference men's basketball standings
	Conf.				Overall
Team	W		L	PCT	W		L	PCT
Little Rock	15	–	5	.750	21	–	10	.677
South Alabama	13	–	7	.650	20	–	11	.645
Texas State	13	–	7	.650	21	–	11	.656
Georgia State	12	–	8	.600	19	–	13	.594
Georgia Southern	12	–	8	.600	20	–	13	.606
Appalachian State	11	–	9	.550	18	–	15	.545
UT Arlington	10	–	10	.500	14	–	18	.438
Louisiana	8	–	12	.400	14	–	19	.424
Arkansas State	8	–	12	.400	16	–	16	.500
Coastal Carolina	8	–	12	.400	16	–	17	.485
Louisiana–Monroe	5	–	15	.250	9	–	20	.310
Troy	5	–	15	.250	9	–	22	.290
Note: The 2020 Sun Belt Tournament was canceled after the quarterfinals due to the COVID-19 pandemic.

2019–20 WAC men's basketball standings
	Conf.				Overall
Team	W		L	PCT	W		L	PCT
New Mexico State	16	–	0	1.000	25	–	6	.806
California Baptist *	10	–	6	.625	21	–	10	.677
Texas–Rio Grande Valley	9	–	7	.563	14	–	16	.467
Kansas City	8	–	7	.533	16	–	14	.533
Seattle	7	–	7	.500	14	–	15	.483
Grand Canyon	8	–	8	.500	13	–	17	.433
Cal State Bakersfield	6	–	10	.375	12	–	19	.387
Utah Valley	5	–	10	.333	11	–	19	.367
Chicago State	0	–	14	.000	4	–	25	.138
* Ineligible for the 2020 NCAA tournament due to transition period. NOTE: The 2020 WAC tournament was canceled due to the COVID-19 pandemic.

2019–20 West Coast Conference men's basketball standings
	Conf.				Overall
Team	W		L	PCT	W		L	PCT
No. 2 Gonzaga †	15	–	1	.938	31	–	2	.939
No. 14 BYU	13	–	3	.813	24	–	8	.750
Saint Mary's	11	–	5	.688	26	–	8	.765
Pacific	11	–	5	.688	23	–	10	.697
San Francisco	9	–	7	.563	22	–	12	.647
Pepperdine	8	–	8	.500	16	–	16	.500
Santa Clara	6	–	10	.375	20	–	13	.606
Loyola Marymount	4	–	12	.250	11	–	21	.344
San Diego	2	–	14	.125	9	–	23	.281
Portland	1	–	15	.063	9	–	23	.281
† 2020 WCC tournament winner Rankings from AP poll

== Award winners ==
=== 2020 Consensus All-America team ===
Consensus First Team
Player	Position	Class	Team
Luka Garza	C	Junior	Iowa
Markus Howard	PG	Senior	Marquette
Myles Powell	PG/SG	Senior	Seton Hall
Payton Pritchard	PG	Senior	Oregon
Obi Toppin	PF	Sophomore	Dayton

Consensus Second Team
Player	Position	Class	Team
Udoka Azubuike	C	Senior	Kansas
Vernon Carey Jr.	PF	Freshman	Duke
Devon Dotson	PG	Sophomore	Kansas
Malachi Flynn	PG/SG	Junior	San Diego State
Cassius Winston	PG	Senior	Michigan State

=== Major player of the year awards ===
- Wooden Award: Obi Toppin, Dayton
- Naismith Award: Obi Toppin, Dayton
- Associated Press Player of the Year: Obi Toppin, Dayton
- NABC Player of the Year: Obi Toppin, Dayton
- Oscar Robertson Trophy (USBWA): Obi Toppin, Dayton
- Sporting News Player of the Year: Luka Garza, Iowa

=== Major freshman of the year awards ===
- Wayman Tisdale Award (USBWA): Vernon Carey Jr., Duke
- NABC Freshman of the Year: Vernon Carey Jr., Duke

=== Major coach of the year awards ===
- Associated Press Coach of the Year: Anthony Grant, Dayton
- Henry Iba Award (USBWA): Anthony Grant, Dayton
- NABC Coach of the Year: Anthony Grant, Dayton
- Naismith College Coach of the Year: Anthony Grant, Dayton
- Sporting News Coach of the Year: Anthony Grant, Dayton

=== Other major awards ===
- Naismith Starting Five:
  - Bob Cousy Award (Best point guard): Payton Pritchard, Oregon
  - Jerry West Award (Best shooting guard): Myles Powell, Seton Hall
  - Julius Erving Award (Best small forward): Saddiq Bey, Villanova
  - Karl Malone Award (Best power forward): Obi Toppin, Dayton
  - Kareem Abdul-Jabbar Award (Best center): Luka Garza, Iowa
- Pete Newell Big Man Award (Best big man): Luka Garza, Iowa
- NABC Defensive Player of the Year: Udoka Azubuike, Kansas
- Naismith Defensive Player of the Year: Marcus Garrett, Kansas
- Senior CLASS Award (top senior on and off the court): Markus Howard, Marquette
- Robert V. Geasey Trophy (Top player in Philadelphia Big 5): Saddiq Bey, Villanova
- Haggerty Award (Top player in New York City metro area): Myles Powell, Seton Hall
- Ben Jobe Award (Top minority coach): Damon Stoudamire, Pacific
- Hugh Durham Award (Top mid-major coach): Steve Forbes, East Tennessee State
- Jim Phelan Award (Top head coach): Steve Pikiell, Rutgers
- Lefty Driesell Award (Top defensive player): Juvaris Hayes, Merrimack
- Lou Henson Award (Top mid-major player): Nathan Knight, William & Mary
- Lute Olson Award (Top non-freshman or transfer player): Payton Pritchard, Oregon
- Skip Prosser Man of the Year Award (Coach with moral character): Mark Prosser, Western Carolina
- Academic All-American of the Year (Top scholar-athlete): Skylar Mays, LSU
- Elite 90 Award (Top GPA among upperclass players at Final Four): Not presented due to cancellation of the 2020 NCAA tournament.
- USBWA Most Courageous Award: Sam Toney, New Jersey City University (NCAA Division III).

== Coaching changes ==
A number of teams changed coaches during the season and after it ended.

Team	Former coach	Interim coach	New coach	Reason
Air Force	Dave Pilipovich		Joe Scott	Air Force fired Pilipovich on March 9 after 8+ seasons, in which the Falcons went 110–151 overall with only 1 season finishing above .500 overall. On March 31, Air Force hired Georgia assistant Joe Scott to serve his second stint as the Falcons' head coach, the first being from 2000 to 2004.
Alabama State	Lewis Jackson		Mo Williams	Jackson announced his resignation from Alabama State on March 27 after 15 seasons at his alma mater, finishing with an overall record of 207–262. Cal State Northridge assistant and 13-year NBA veteran Mo Williams was named the new head coach of the Hornets on May 12.
Alcorn State	Montez Robinson		Landon Bussie	Robinson's contract was not renewed on March 23, ending his 5-year tenure at Alcorn State with a 69–86 overall record. Prairie View A&M assistant Bussie was named the new head coach of the Braves on April 23.
Central Arkansas	Russ Pennell	Anthony Boone		Pennell, who had been on a leave of absence from UCA for undisclosed personal reasons since December 16, announced on January 7 that he will not return to his alma mater after 5½ seasons. Assistant coach Boone, who served as interim coach during Pennell's initial leave, continued in that role for the rest of the season, and had the interim tag removed on March 9.
East Tennessee State	Steve Forbes		Jason Shay	Forbes left East Tennessee on April 30 after 5 seasons to accept the Wake Forest head coaching job. On May 7, assistant coach Shay was promoted to head coach of the Buccaneers.
Evansville	Walter McCarty	Bennie Seltzer	Todd Lickliter	McCarty, who was in his 2nd season as Evansville head coach, was initially placed on administrative leave on December 27 pending a Title IX investigation against him. Assistant coach Seltzer served as the interim coach of the Purple Aces during McCarty's initial absence. On January 21, Evansville fired McCarty following additional allegations of misconduct, and named former Butler/Iowa head coach Todd Lickliter, who had served as assistant coach under McCarty last season before resigning due to health problems, as the new head coach.
Georgia Southern	Mark Byington		Brian Burg	Byington left Georgia Southern on March 20 after 7 seasons to accept the James Madison head coaching job. On March 29, The Eagles named Texas Tech assistant coach Burg as their new head coach.
Grand Canyon	Dan Majerle		Bryce Drew	Grand Canyon fired Majerle on March 13 after 7 seasons. While the former NBA star had led the Antelopes to a 136–89 overall record including top-three WAC finishes in each of his first six seasons, the team went 13–17 this past season, tying for fifth in the WAC. Former Valparaiso/Vanderbilt coach Drew was hired as the new head coach on March 17.
Green Bay	Linc Darner		Will Ryan	In a surprising announcement, Green Bay parted ways with Darner on May 17 after 5 seasons and a 92–80 record, including an NCAA tournament appearance in his first season. On June 7, the Phoenix hired Will Ryan, son of former Wisconsin coach and College Basketball Hall of Fame inductee Bo Ryan, from Division II Wheeling University as their new head coach.
Iona	Tim Cluess	Tra Arnold	Rick Pitino	After not coaching during the 2019–20 season due to an undisclosed health issue, Cluess stepped down on March 13 after 10 seasons at Iona. Under Cluess, the Gaels won 203 games overall, including winning the MAAC regular season and/or the conference tournament from 2012 to 2019. After a 2-year absence from college coaching, former Louisville coach Pitino was hired to replace him the next day.
James Madison	Louis Rowe		Mark Byington	JMU parted ways with Rowe on March 9 following the Dukes' 9–21 season. Rowe had records of 43–85 overall and 21–51 in CAA play after four seasons at his alma mater. The Dukes hired Georgia Southern head coach Mark Byington as his replacement on March 20.
Loyola Marymount	Mike Dunlap		Stan Johnson	Dunlap was relieved of his duties on March 9 after six seasons at his alma mater. Dunlap's record at LMU was 81–101, capped off by 11–21 overall and 4–12 WCC records this past season. The Lions hired Marquette associate head coach Johnson as Dunlap's replacement on March 20.
Niagara	Patrick Beilein	Greg Paulus		Beilein, the son of former Cleveland Cavaliers head coach John Beilein and who had been hired from Division II Le Moyne after last season, announced his resignation on October 24, 2019 for undisclosed personal reasons. The Purple Eagles named assistant Paulus as interim head coach for the 2019–20 season, and removed the interim tag on November 7, the day before the team's season opener.
North Carolina A&T	Jay Joyner	Willie Jones		Joyner, who had been suspended since December 2019 for unspecified reasons, announced his resignation from N.C. A&T on June 16 after 3 full seasons and 2 partial seasons as head coach. Assistant coach Jones, who served as the interim head coach of the Aggies during Joyner's suspension, was named head coach 2 days later.
Northern Colorado	Jeff Linder		Steve Smiley	Northern Colorado saw its head coaching position open up when Linder left after 4 seasons to take the Wyoming job on March 17. The Bears filled the vacant position by promoting assistant coach Smiley on March 19.
Penn State	Pat Chambers	Jim Ferry	Micah Shrewsberry	Chambers resigned from Penn State on October 21, 2020 after 9 seasons following an investigation into reports of racial insensitivity within the Penn State program. Assistant coach Ferry was named the interim head coach for the 2020–21 season. Following the conclusion of their season, the Nittany Lions hired Purdue associate head coach Micah Shrewsberry as their new head coach on March 15, 2021.
Samford	Scott Padgett		Bucky McMillan	Samford parted ways with Padgett on March 16 after 6 seasons, in which the Bulldogs went 84–115 overall and never finished higher than 6th in SoCon play. On April 8, the school hired McMillan, who spent the last 12 seasons as head coach at nearby Mountain Brook High School, as their new head coach.
Southeast Missouri State	Rick Ray		Brad Korn	Ray was relieved of his head coaching duties on March 3 after 5 seasons at Southeast Missouri State, in which the Redhawks went 51–104 overall. Kansas State assistant coach Korn was hired as Ray's replacement on March 23.
Texas State	Danny Kaspar	Terrence Johnson		Kaspar, who had been under investigation for making racially insensitive comments by former players, announced his resignation from Texas State on September 22, 2020 after 7 seasons and a 119–109 record. Assistant coach Johnson initially was named as the Bobcats interim head coach for the 2020–21 season. On March 11, 2021, Texas State removed the interim tag from Johnson and officially named him the new head coach.
UAB	Robert Ehsan		Andy Kennedy	UAB parted ways with Ehsan on March 13 after 4 seasons, in which the Blazers were 76–57 overall and never made the NCAA or NIT tournament. UAB alum and former Cincinnati/Ole Miss coach Andy Kennedy was named the new head coach on March 20.
UC Riverside	David Patrick		Mike Magpayo	Patrick resigned from UCR on July 1, 2020 after 2 seasons to become associate head coach at Arkansas. Highlanders associate head coach Magpayo was promoted to the head coach position, becoming the first Asian-American head coach in Division I men's basketball.
UIC	Steve McClain		Luke Yaklich	UIC parted ways with McClain on March 13 after 5 seasons and a 76–93 overall record. On March 25, The Flames hired Texas assistant Yaklich as their new head coach.
UNC Wilmington	C. B. McGrath	Rob Burke	Takayo Siddle	McGrath was fired on January 13 after a 26–58 record in 2½ seasons at Wilmington, including starting the season 5–14 overall and 0–6 in CAA, and replaced by assistant coach Rob Burke for the rest of the season. NC State assistant coach and former UNCW assistant Siddle was named the new head coach of the Seahawks on March 13.
Wake Forest	Danny Manning		Steve Forbes	Wake Forest fired Manning on April 25 after 6 seasons, in which the Demon Deacons went 78–111 overall and finished no higher than 10th place in conference play. The school hired Steve Forbes away from East Tennessee State on April 30.
Western Illinois	Billy Wright		Rob Jeter	After a 53–115 overall record including finishing no higher than 8th place in conference play, Wright's contract was not renewed on March 3, ending his 6-year tenure at Western Illinois. Minnesota assistant coach and former UW–Milwaukee head coach Rob Jeter was hired as the new head coach of the Leathernecks on March 30.
Western Michigan	Steve Hawkins		Clayton Bates	Western Michigan parted ways with Hawkins on March 11 after 17 seasons, in which the Broncos went 291–262 overall, but only made the NCAA Tournament twice under his tenure. Associate head coach Bates was promoted to the open job on March 28.
Wyoming	Allen Edwards		Jeff Linder	Wyoming parted ways with Edwards on March 9 after 4 seasons, during which the Cowboys went 60–76 overall, including a 17–48 record in Edwards' final 2 seasons at the school. On March 17, the Cowboys hired Linder from Northern Colorado as their new head coach.

== See also ==
- 2019–20 NCAA Division I women's basketball season
