= Dave Pilipovich =

American college basketball coach (born 1964)

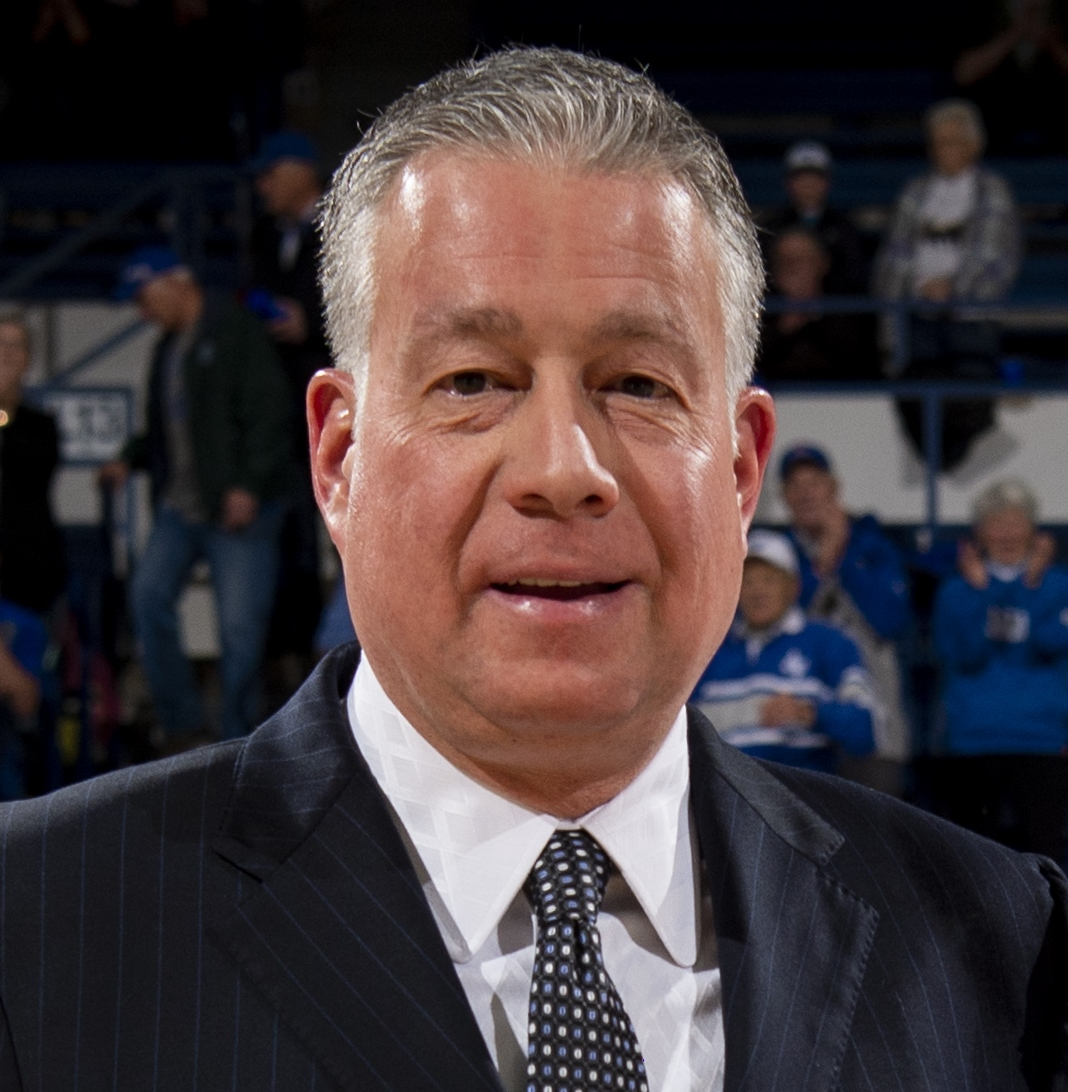
- Pilipovich in 2019

Current position
- Title: Assistant coach
- Team: Colorado State
- Conference: Mountain West Conference

Biographical details
- Born: January 28, 1964 (age 62); Duquesne, Pennsylvania, U.S.
- Education: Thiel College (1986)

Playing career
- 1982–1986: Thiel
- Position: Guard

Coaching career (HC unless noted)
- 1986–1988: California (PA) (GA)
- 1988–1991: Florida Atlantic (assistant)
- 1991–1994: Florida Atlantic (associate HC)
- 1994–1996: Georgia State (assistant)
- 1996–2000: Robert Morris (assistant)
- 2000–2005: Eastern Michigan (assistant)
- 2005–2006: Michigan (basketball admin.)
- 2006–2007: Michigan (assistant)
- 2007–2012: Air Force (assistant)
- 2012–2020: Air Force
- 2020–2021: New Mexico (special asst.)
- 2021–2022: Austin Spurs (assistant)
- 2022–2024: New Mexico (special asst.)
- 2024–2025: New Mexico (assistant)
- 2025-present: Colorado State (assistant)

Head coaching record
- Overall: 110–151
- Tournaments: 1–1 (CIT)

David Gabe Pilipovich (born January 28, 1964) is an American college basketball coach, who is currently an assistant coach at Colorado State University He played college basketball at Thiel College. Pilipovich was previously the head coach at the U.S. Air Force Academy from 2012 to 2020.

== Early life and education ==
Pilipovich grew up in Duquesne, Pennsylvania and graduated from Duquesne High School. At Thiel College, Pilipovich played basketball for four years and was a team captain as a senior. He graduated from Thiel in 1986 with a bachelor's degree in business administration. In 1988, he completed a master's degree in geography and regional planning from California University of Pennsylvania.

== Coaching career ==
=== Early coaching career (1986–2005) ===
Pilipovich began his coaching career as a graduate assistant at California University of Pennsylvania in 1986 before being named an assistant coach in 1988. Then from 1989 to 1991, Pilipovich was an assistant coach at Florida Atlantic. He was promoted to associate head coach, a position he would have from 1991 to 1994. From 1994 to 1996, Pilipovich was an assistant coach at Georgia State.

He then returned to Western Pennsylvania to be assistant coach at Robert Morris from 1996 to 2000. At Robert Morris, Pilipovich helped head coach Jim Boone turn around a losing program, with two straight winning seasons in 1998–99 with a 15–12 record followed by an 18–12 record in 1999–2000. Pilipovich then followed Boone to Eastern Michigan, serving as an assistant coach from 2000 to 2005, the entirety of Boone's tenure at the school.

=== Michigan assistant (2005–2007) ===
From 2005 to 2007, Pilipovich served on the staff of Tommy Amaker at Michigan, first as an administrative assistant in 2005–06 then as an assistant coach in 2006–07. Michigan appeared in two straight NITs that season, including the 2006 National Invitation Tournament final.

=== Air Force assistant (2007–2012) ===
From 2007 to 2012, Pilipovich spent five years as an assistant at Air Force under Jeff Reynolds. Following the 2009-10 season, the Falcons appeared in the post-season collegeinsider.com tournament. This was the Falcons first post-season tournament since 2007.

=== Air Force (2012–2020) ===
Pilipovich became the head coach at Air Force in February 2012 after Reynolds was relieved of his duties. In his first year as head coach, he led the Falcons to a 58-56 victory over then 13th-ranked San Diego State, marking Air Force's first-ever win against a Top 20 team and just its second win over a ranked opponent. Pilipovich won two of his first three games as Air Force's head coach.

In the 2012–13 season, Pilipovich led the Falcons to an 18–14 (8–8 MWC) record, tying the fourth most single season wins in program history. Air Force appeared in the 2013 CollegeInsider.com Postseason Tournament and achieved the first post-season road win in school history with a 69-65 victory at Hawai'i. Pilipovich also became the first Air Force head coach to beat two ranked teams in the same season and owns three of Air Force's four wins against ranked opponents, including an 89-88 win over the twelfth ranked New Mexico.

However, the 2012–13 season would be the only winning season that Pilipovich had in eight full seasons as head coach. In 2018–19, Air Force finished 14–18 (8–10 MW), tying the 2012–13 team for the most single season conference wins. However, the 2019–20 team had a 12–20 (5–13 MW) record. On March 9, 2020, Pilipovich was fired. Pilipovich left Air Force with a cumulative 110–151 (50–99 MW) record.

=== New Mexico assistant (2020–2021) ===
Pilipovich became special assistant to head coach Paul Weir at New Mexico on October 23, 2020.

=== Austin Spurs (2021–2022) ===
In September 2021, he was named an assistant coach with the Austin Spurs, the NBA G League development team for the San Antonio Spurs.

=== Colorado State (2025-present) ===
In 2025, Pilipovich was added to Ali Farokhmanesh's inaugural coaching staff at Colorado State University. He had previously been serving in his second stint as an assistant coach at the University of New Mexico.

== Personal ==
Pilipovich is married to Kelly and has two children, Kyle and Kelsey. Pilipovich is of Serbian descent.

== Head coaching record ==
Record table
Season	Team	Overall	Conference	Standing	Postseason
Air Force Falcons (Mountain West Conference) (2012–2020)
2011–12 (Note: Pilipovich took over as interim head coach on February 8, 2012 after head coach Jeff Reynolds was fired. Their cumulative record for the 2011–12 season is 13–16 (3–11 MW).)	Air Force	2–6	2–6	T-7th	
2012–13	Air Force	18–14	8–8	6th	CIT Second Round
2013–14	Air Force	12–18	6–12	10th	
2014–15	Air Force	14–17	6–12	9th	
2015–16	Air Force	14–18	5–13	10th	
2016–17	Air Force	11–21	4–14	T–10th	
2017–18	Air Force	12–19	6–12	9th	
2018–19	Air Force	14–18	8–10	6th	
2019–20	Air Force	12–20	5–13	9th	
Air Force:		110–151 (.421)	50–100 (.333)		
Total:		110–151 (.421)			
