= Jeff Reynolds (basketball) =

American college basketball coach (born 1956)

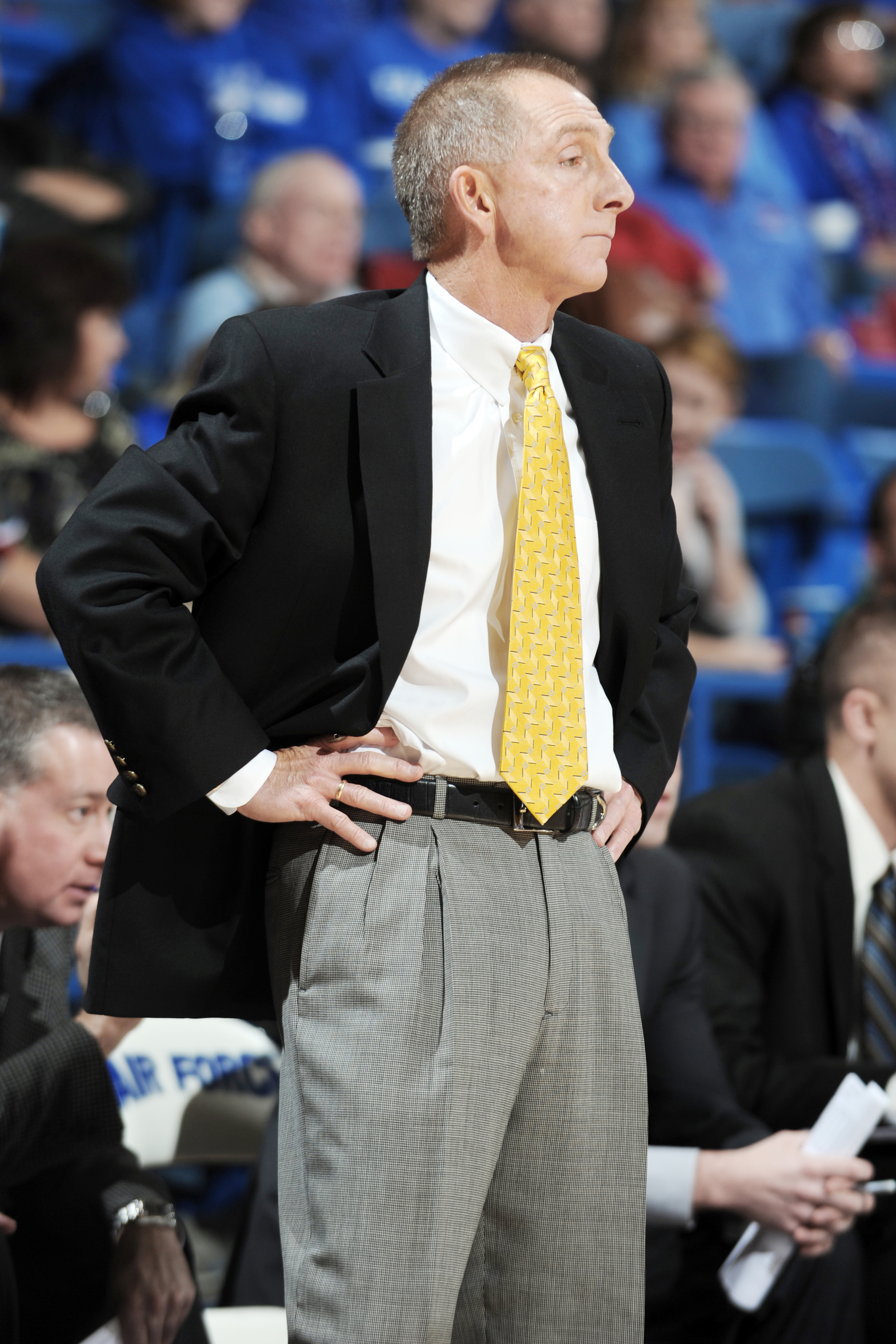
- Reynolds at Clune Arena in 2009

Biographical details
- Born: September 7, 1956 (age 70); Mountain City, Tennessee, U.S.

Playing career
- 1974–1976: Surry CC
- 1976–1978: UNC Greensboro
- Position: Guard

Coaching career (HC unless noted)
- 1978–1980: Carroll County HS (assistant)
- 1980–1981: Carroll County HS
- 1981–1982: James Madison (assistant)
- 1982–1985: Randolph–Macon (assistant)
- 1985–1986: NC Wesleyan
- 1986–1990: Winthrop (assistant)
- 1990–1994: UNC Wilmington (assistant)
- 1995–1997: UNC Greensboro (assistant)
- 1997–2000: Wingate
- 2000–2005: Tulane (assistant)
- 2005–2007: Air Force (assistant)
- 2007–2012: Air Force
- 2018–2019: Texas A&M (assistant)
- 2021–2026: Clemson (special assistant)

Administrative career (AD unless noted)
- 2014–2017: Virginia Tech (dir. of operations)

Head coaching record
- Tournaments: 0–2 (NCAA Division II); 1–1 (CIT)

Accomplishments and honors

Championships
- USA South Athletic regular season (1986); 2 SAC regular season (1999, 2000); SAC tournament (2000)

Awards
- SAC Coach of the Year (1999)

Jeffrey Lee Reynolds (born September 7, 1956) is an American college basketball coach. Reynolds recently served as a special assistant basketball coach under Brad Brownell at Clemson from 2021-2026 before deciding to step away. Reynolds served as the head men's basketball coach at North Carolina Wesleyan College in 1985–96, Wingate University from 1997 to 2000, and the United States Air Force Academy from 2007 to 2012.

== Early life and playing career ==
Born in Mountain City, Tennessee, Reynolds played college basketball at Surry Community College from 1974 to 1976 then at UNC Greensboro from 1976 to 1978. As a junior in 1976–77, Reynolds averaged 6.3 points.

== Coaching career ==
From 1978 to 1980, Reynolds was assistant coach at Carroll County High School in Hillsville, Virginia, before being promoted to head coach for the 1980–81 season.

Reynolds started his college coaching career at James Madison University in 1981, serving as a part-time assistant. He also served as an assistant coach at Randolph-Macon College from 1982 to 1985, Winthrop from 1986 to 1990, UNCW from 1990 to 1994, UNC Greensboro from 1994 to 1997, and Tulane from 2002 to 2007.

Reynolds was a head coach at the Division III level at NC Wesleyan in the 1985–86 season and Division II level at Wingate University from 1997 to 2000 and the Division III level.

After two seasons as an assistant coach at the United States Air Force Academy, in April 2007 Reynolds was named to succeed Jeff Bzdelik as head coach. Athletic director Hans Mueh said he was "absolutely blown away by (Reynolds’) passion, emotion and vision." In five seasons, Reynolds guided the Falcons to one postseason appearance and was one of only two coaches in program history with multiple conference tournament wins. He was fired on February 8, 2012.

Reynolds then became Director of Men's Basketball Operations at Marquette, where he served from 2012 to 2014 before taking his current position with Virginia Tech. While at Marquette, the Golden Eagles advanced to the Elite Eight of the NCAA men's basketball tournament.

== Head coaching record ==
Record table
Season	Team	Overall	Conference	Standing	Postseason
North Carolina Wesleyan Battling Bishops (USA South Athletic Conference) (1985–1986)
1985–86	North Carolina Wesleyan	21–7	11–3	1st	
North Carolina Wesleyan:		21–7	11–3		
Wingate Bulldogs (South Atlantic Conference) (1997–2000)
1997–98	Wingate	12–17	3–11	T–7th	
1998–99	Wingate	23–6	12–2	1st	NCAA Division II Second Round
1999–00	Wingate	26–4	13–3	T–1st	NCAA Division II Second Round
Wingate:		61–27			
Air Force Falcons (Mountain West Conference) (2007–2012)
2007–08	Air Force	16–14	8–8	5th	
2008–09	Air Force	10–21	0–16	9th	
2009–10	Air Force	10–21	1–15	9th	
2010–11	Air Force	16–16	6–10	T–6th	CIT Second Round
2011–12 (Note: Dave Pilipovich took over as interim head coach on February 8, 2012 after Reynolds was fired. Their cumulative record for the 2011–12 season is 13–16 (3–11 MW).)	Air Force	11–10	1–6	(fired)	
Air Force:		63–82	16-55		
Total:		145–116			
National champion Postseason invitational champion Conference regular season champion Conference regular season and conference tournament champion Division regular season champion Division regular season and conference tournament champion Conference tournament champion
