= Utah State Aggies men's basketball statistical leaders =

Statistical record keepers

The Utah State Aggies men's basketball statistical leaders are individual statistical leaders of the Utah State Aggies men's basketball program in various categories, including points, assists, blocks, rebounds, and steals. Within those areas, the lists identify single-game, single-season, and career leaders. The Aggies represent Utah State University in the NCAA Division I Pac-12 Conference.

Utah State began competing in intercollegiate basketball in 1903. However, the school's record book does not generally list records from before the 1950s, as records from before this period are often incomplete and inconsistent. Since scoring was much lower in this era, and teams played much fewer games during a typical season, it is likely that few or no players from this era would appear on these lists anyway.

The NCAA did not officially record assists as a stat until the 1983–84 season, and blocks and steals until the 1985–86 season, but Utah State's record books includes players in these stats before these seasons. These lists are updated through the end of the 2021–22 season.

== Scoring ==
Career
Rk	Player	Points	Seasons
1	Jaycee Carroll	2522	2004–05 2005–06 2006–07 2007–08
2	Sam Merrill	2197	2016–17 2017–18 2018–19 2019–20
3	Greg Grant	2127	1982–83 1983–84 1984–85 1985–86
4	Wayne Estes	2001	1962–63 1963–64 1964–65
5	Brian Jackson	1900	1977–78 1978–79 1979–80 1980–81
6	Cornell Green	1890	1959–60 1960–61 1961–62
7	Marvin Roberts	1844	1968–69 1969–70 1970–71
8	Kendall Youngblood	1774	1988–89 1989–90 1990–91 1991–92
9	Tai Wesley	1749	2007–08 2008–09 2009–10 2010–11
10	Jalen Moore	1645	2013–14 2014–15 2015–16 2016–17

Season
Rk	Player	Points	Season
1	Wayne Estes	821	1963–64
2	Jaycee Carroll	785	2007–08
3	Jaycee Carroll	746	2006–07
4	Cornell Green	745	1961–62
5	Sam Merrill	731	2018–19
6	Marvin Roberts	718	1968–69
7	Shaler Halimon	671	1967–68
8	Brian Jackson	655	1980–81
9	Wayne Estes	641	1964–65
10	Greg Grant	634	1985–86

Single game
Rk	Player	Points	Season	Opponent
1	Wayne Estes	52	1964–65	Boston College
2	Wayne Estes	48	1964–65	Denver
3	Shaler Halimon	47	1967–68	Brigham Young
4	Cornell Green	46	1961–62	New Mexico
5	Nate Williams	45	1969–70	St. Peter's
	Max Perry	45	1960–61	New Mexico
7	Jaycee Carroll	44	2006–07	New Mexico St.
8	Marvin Roberts	43	1968–69	Montana State
	Marvin Roberts	43	1968–69	West Texas State
	Wayne Estes	43	1964–65	Utah

== Rebounds ==
Career
Rk	Player	Rebounds	Seasons
1	Cornell Green	1067	1959–60 1960–61 1961–62
2	Justin Bean	1027	2018–19 2019–20 2020–21 2021–22
3	Greg Grant	1003	1982–83 1983–84 1984–85 1985–86
4	Marvin Roberts	997	1968–69 1969–70 1970–71
5	Wayne Estes	893	1962–63 1963–64 1964–65
6	Eric Franson	885	1990–91 1993–94 1994–95 1995–96
7	Tai Wesley	873	2007–08 2008–09 2009–10 2010–11
8	Brian Jackson	840	1977–78 1978–79 1979–80 1980–81
9	Spencer Nelson	800	1998–99 2002–03 2003–04 2004–05
10	Neemias Queta	777	2018–19 2019–20 2020–21

Season
Rk	Player	Rebounds	Season
1	Cornell Green	403	1959–60
2	Marvin Roberts	388	1969–70
3	Wayne Estes	377	1963–64
4	Troy Collier	357	1963–64
5	Justin Bean	356	2019–20
6	Jerry Schofield	348	1959–60
7	Tyler Wilbon	345	1960–61
8	Cornell Green	342	1961–62
9	Justin Bean	338	2021–22
10	Marvin Roberts	325	1968–69

Single game
Rk	Player	Rebounds	Season	Opponent
1	Wayne Estes	28	1962–63	Regis
2	Jerry Schofield	27	1959–60	Pacific
3	Wayne Estes	25	1964–65	Colorado State
	Wayne Estes	25	1964–65	Pacific
5	Shaler Halimon	24	1967–68	Evansville
	Jerry Schofield	24	1958–59	New Mexico
	Harold Theus	24	1958–59	Denver
	Troy Collier	24	1962–63	Michigan State
9	Troy Collier	23	1963–64	Colorado State
10	Mike Santos	22	1976–77	Portland State
	Mike Santos	22	1975–76	Seattle
	Bob Lauriski	22	1972–73	Houston Baptist
	Nate Williams	22	1969–70	Houston
	Marvin Roberts	22	1969–70	Delaware
	Marvin Roberts	22	1968–69	Portland
	Marvin Roberts	22	1968–69	Denver

== Assists ==
Career
Rk	Player	Assists	Seasons
1	Oscar Williams	562	1974–75 1975–76 1976–77 1977–78
2	Sam Merrill	477	2016–17 2017–18 2018–19 2019–20
3	Kevin Nixon	428	1984–85 1985–86 1986–87 1987–88
4	Tony Brown	396	1998–99 1999–00 2000–01 2001–02
5	Kendall Youngblood	389	1988–89 1989–90 1990–91 1991–92
6	Kris Clark	370	2006–07 2007–08
7	Tyler Newbold	364	2007–08 2008–09 2009–10 2010–11
	Jay Goodman	364	1990–91 1991–92 1992–93
9	Tai Wesley	356	2007–08 2008–09 2009–10 2010–11
10	Steven Ashworth	353	2020–21 2021–22 2022–23

Season
Rk	Player	Assists	Season
1	Darius Brown II	228	2023–24
2	Kris Clark	224	2007–08
3	Jay Goodman	185	1992–93
	Oscar Williams	185	1976–77
5	Kevin Nixon	182	1987–88
6	Rich McElrath	172	1979–80
7	Oscar Williams	168	1977–78
8	Duane Rogers	166	1995–96
9	Drake Allen	163	2025–26
10	Brockeith Pane	159	2011–12

Single game
Rk	Player	Assists	Season	Opponent
1	Oscar Williams	16	1976–77	Utah
2	Gary Malmrose	15	1975–76	Mesa State
3	Oscar Williams	14	1976–77	Portland State
	Oscar Williams	14	1974–75	Brigham Young
5	Mark Brown	13	2003–04	Illinois State
	Bernard Rock	13	1999–00	North Texas
	Jay Goodman	13	1992–93	Nevada-Las Vegas
	Oscar Williams	13	1976–77	Brigham Young
	Ken Thompson	13	1972–73	Nevada
10	Sam Merrill	12	2019–20	San Diego State
	Sam Merrill	12	2018–19	Air Force
	David Pak	12	2005–06	Fresno State
	Mark Brown	12	2002–03	CS Fullerton
	Allen Gordon	12	1990–91	San José State
	Oscar Williams	12	1975–76	Oregon State

== Steals ==
Career
Rk	Player	Steals	Seasons
1	Greg Grant	226	1982–83 1983–84 1984–85 1985–86
2	Jay Goodman	205	1990–91 1991–92 1992–93
3	Mason Falslev	192	2023–24 2024–25 2025–26
4	Kevin Nixon	190	1984–85 1985–86 1986–87 1987–88
5	Kendall Youngblood	164	1988–89 1989–90 1990–91 1991–92
6	Justin Bean	161	2018–19 2019–20 2020–21 2021–22
7	Tony Brown	146	1998–99 1999–00 2000–01 2001–02
8	Sam Merrill	129	2016–17 2017–18 2018–19 2019–20
9	Reid Newey	128	1983–84 1986–87 1987–88 1988–89
10	Jaycee Carroll	123	2004–05 2005–06 2006–07 2007–08

Season
Rk	Player	Steals	Season
1	Jay Goodman	102	1992–93
2	Mason Falslev	79	2024–25
3	Kevin Nixon	78	1987–88
4	Rich McElrath	71	1979–80
5	Mason Falslev	70	2025–26
6	Drake Allen	69	2025–26
7	Greg Grant	66	1985–86
8	Greg Grant	59	1984–85
9	Greg Grant	57	1982–83
10	Kevin Rice	55	1997–98
	Kevin Nixon	55	1986–87

Single game
Rk	Player	Steals	Season	Opponent
1	Jay Goodman	9	1992–93	San José State
2	Jay Goodman	8	1992–93	Montana Tech
3	Jay Goodman	7	1991–92	New Mexico State
	Jay Goodman	7	1991–92	Weber State
	Kevin Nixon	7	1987–88	Weber State

== Blocks ==
Career
Rk	Player	Blocks	Seasons
1	Neemias Queta	219	2018–19 2019–20 2020–21
2	Gilbert Pete	155	1985–86 1986–87 1987–88 1988–89
3	Nate Wickizer	148	1991–92 1992–93 1993–94 1994–95
4	Tai Wesley	144	2007–08 2008–09 2009–10 2010–11
5	Shawn Daniels	117	1999–00 2000–01
6	Nate Harris	90	2002–03 2003–04 2004–05 2005–06
7	Brady Jardine	70	2008–09 2009–10 2010–11 2011–12
8	Jalen Moore	69	2013–14 2014–15 2015–16 2016–17
9	Trevin Dorius	66	2019–20 2020–21 2021–22 2022–23
10	Kyisean Reed	65	2011–12 2012–13

Season
Rk	Player	Blocks	Season
1	Neemias Queta	97	2020–21
2	Neemias Queta	84	2018–19
3	Shawn Daniels	59	2000–01
4	Shawn Daniels	58	1999–00
	Gilbert Pete	58	1986–87
6	David Collette	56	2014–15
7	Great Osobor	50	2023–24
8	Nate Wickizer	47	1992–93
9	Tai Wesley	46	2009–10
	Nate Wickizer	46	1991–92
	Dimitri Jorssen	46	1999–00

Single game
Rk	Player	Blocks	Season	Opponent
1	Neemias Queta	9	2020–21	Colorado State
2	Neemias Queta	7	2020–21	Texas Tech
	Shawn Daniels	7	2000–01	Pacific
	Gilbert Pete	7	1986–87	Long Beach State
