= Senator Bullen =

Senator Bullen may refer to:

- Charles Bullen (Utah politician) (1919–2009), Utah State Senate
- Herschel Bullen (1870–1966), Utah State Senate
- Reed Bullen (1906–2005), Utah State Senate
