= Craig Smith (basketball, born 1972) =

American college basketball coach (born 1972)

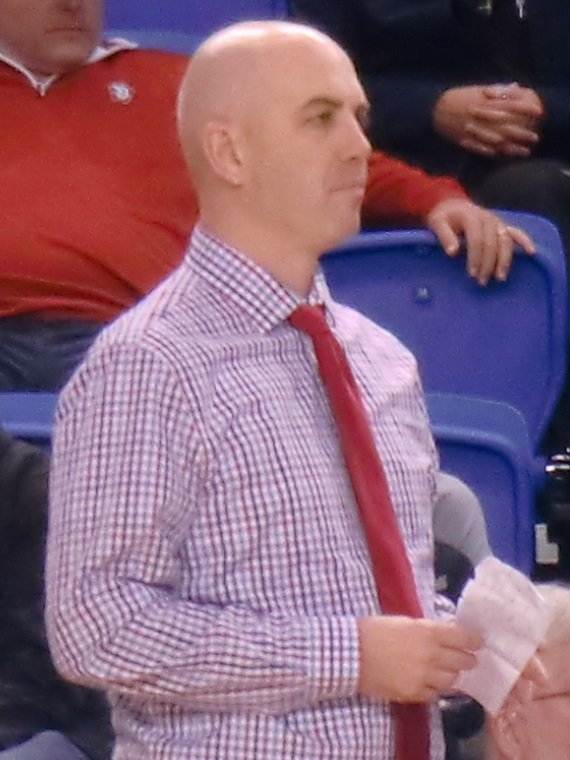
- Smith in 2017

Current position
- Title: Head coach

Biographical details
- Born: December 14, 1972 (age 53); Stephen, Minnesota, U.S.
- Education: North Dakota ('96)

Coaching career (HC unless noted)
- 1996–1997: Mayville State (assistant)
- 1997–1998: Northern State (GA)
- 1998–2001: Minot State (assistant)
- 2001–2004: North Dakota State (assistant)
- 2004–2007: Mayville State
- 2008–2012: Colorado State (assistant)
- 2012–2014: Nebraska (assistant)
- 2014–2018: South Dakota
- 2018–2021: Utah State
- 2021–2025: Utah

Administrative career (AD unless noted)
- 2007–2008: Colorado State (dir. of ops.)

Head coaching record
- Overall: 290–169 (.632)
- Tournaments: 0–2 (NCAA DI); 6–3 (NAIA DII); 3–2 (NIT); 0–1 (CBI)

Accomplishments and honors

Championships
- 2 DAC regular season (2006, 2007); 2 DAC tournament (2006, 2007); Summit League regular season (2017); MWC regular season (2019); 2 MWC tournament (2019, 2020)

Awards
- NAIA Division II Coach of the Year (2007); 2× DAC Coach of the Year (2006, 2007); Summit League Coach of the Year (2017); MWC Coach of the Year (2019)

Craig Francis Smith (born December 14, 1972) is an American college basketball coach who was most recently the head coach for the Utah Utes men's team of the Big 12 Conference until 2025. He served as an assistant for Tim Miles at four schools – Mayville State, North Dakota State, Colorado State, and Nebraska. Smith was also the head coach at Mayville State from 2004 to 2007, at South Dakota from 2014 to 2018, and at Utah State from 2018 to 2021.

== Early life and education ==
Born in Stephen, Minnesota, Smith graduated from the University of North Dakota in 1996 with a bachelor's degree in secondary education and Northern State University in South Dakota with a master's degree in education in 1999.

== Coaching career ==
=== Beginnings as assistant coach (1996–2004) ===
Smith began his coaching career in 1996 as an assistant coach for one season at Mayville State University, an NAIA school in North Dakota. This was the first of several coaching roles under Tim Miles.

In 1997, Smith enrolled in graduate school at Northern State, an NCAA Division II school in South Dakota, and became a graduate assistant with its men's basketball team. Returning to North Dakota, Smith was an assistant coach at Minot State from 1998 to 2001.

In 2001, Smith reunited with Miles at then-NCAA Division II North Dakota State, where he was an assistant coach and director of operations for three seasons.

=== Mayville State (2004–2007) ===
After three seasons at North Dakota State, Smith returned to Mayville State, this time as head coach in 2004. Inheriting a team that had one win in the previous season, Smith led the Comets to 17 wins and a berth in the NAIA Division II Tournament in his first season of 2004–05.

Smith's second season as Mayville State head coach in 2005–06 had a 28–6 record, good enough to break the record for most wins in program history. Mayville won the Dakota Athletic Conference (DAC) regular season and conference titles and qualified for the NAIA Tournament for the second straight season, this time making the quarterfinals. With a 27–9 record in Smith's final season 2006–07, Mayville State won both DAC titles again and made the championship round of the NAIA tournament as a no. 13 seed. Smith won NAIA Division II Coach of the Year honors in 2007 and DAC Coach of the Year Honors in 2006 and 2007.

=== Assistant coach at Colorado State and Nebraska (2007–2014) ===
Smith got his first NCAA Division I job on April 10, 2007, as director of operations at Colorado State, his third association with Tim Miles. Miles promoted Smith to a full assistant coach in 2008. During his time at Colorado State, Smith helped the team qualify for the 2010 CBI, 2011 NIT, and 2012 NCAA tournament.

On April 25, 2012, Smith followed Miles to Nebraska after Miles took the head coaching job there. Smith helped Nebraska make the 2014 NCAA tournament.

=== South Dakota (2014–2018) ===
Smith became a head coach again on March 24, 2014, when South Dakota athletic director David Herbster named Smith men's basketball head coach. Following a 12–18 season in 2013–14, South Dakota went 17–16 (10–8 in Summit League play) in Smith's first season of 2014–15. In 2016–17, Smith won Summit League Coach of the Year honors after South Dakota won the Summit League regular season title and qualified for the 2017 NIT. Smith's last season in 2017 with the Coyotes ended 26–9, with a 2nd-place finish in the Summit League both in the regular season and conference tournament, the Coyotes would later fall to North Texas in the 2018 College Basketball Invitational first round 77–90.

=== Utah State (2018–2021) ===
On March 26, 2018, Smith was announced as Utah State's new head coach after the firing of Tim Duryea. In just his first season at the school, he led the Aggies to a share of the Mountain West regular-season title, as well as the tournament title. This performance earned them their first appearance in the NCAA tournament since 2011. The team repeated as Mountain West tournament champions in 2020, though the NCAA tournament was cancelled amid the ongoing COVID-19 pandemic. In 2021, Smith earned his third consecutive NCAA tournament appearance with the Aggies with an at-large bid.

=== Utah (2021–2025) ===
Smith was hired to be the new head coach of the Utah Utes men's basketball team on March 27, 2021. He was fired on February 24, 2025. He finished with a 65–62 overall record.

== Head coaching record ==
Record table
Season	Team	Overall	Conference	Standing	Postseason
Mayville State Comets (Dakota Athletic Conference) (2004–2007)
2004–05	Mayville State	17–14	11–7	3rd	NAIA Division II First Round
2005–06	Mayville State	28–6	12–2	1st	NAIA Division II Quarterfinals
2006–07	Mayville State	27–9	11–3	1st	NAIA Division II Runner-Up
Mayville State:		72–29 (.713)	34–12 (.739)		
South Dakota Coyotes (Summit League) (2014–2018)
2014–15	South Dakota	17–16	9–7	T–4th	
2015–16	South Dakota	14–18	5–11	8th	
2016–17	South Dakota	22–12	12–4	1st	NIT First Round
2017–18	South Dakota	26–9	11–3	2nd	CBI First Round
South Dakota:		79–55 (.590)	37–25 (.597)		
Utah State Aggies (Mountain West Conference) (2018–2021)
2018–19	Utah State	28–7	15–3	T–1st	NCAA Division I Round of 64
2019–20	Utah State	26–8	12–6	T–2nd	NCAA Division I*
2020–21	Utah State	20–9	15–4	2nd	NCAA Division I Round of 64
Utah State:		74–24 (.755)	42–13 (.764)	* 2020 NCAA Tournament cancelled	
Utah Utes (Pac-12 Conference) (2021–2024)
2021–22	Utah	11–20	4–16	11th	
2022–23	Utah	17–15	10–10	7th	
2023–24	Utah	22–15	9–11	T–6th	NIT Semifinals
Utah Utes (Big 12 Conference) (2024–2025)
2024–25	Utah	15–12	7–9	(fired)	
Utah:		65–62 (.512)	30–46 (.395)		
Total:		290–170 (.630)			
National champion Postseason invitational champion Conference regular season champion Conference regular season and conference tournament champion Division regular season champion Division regular season and conference tournament champion Conference tournament champion
