= Sam Merrill =

American basketball player (born 1996)

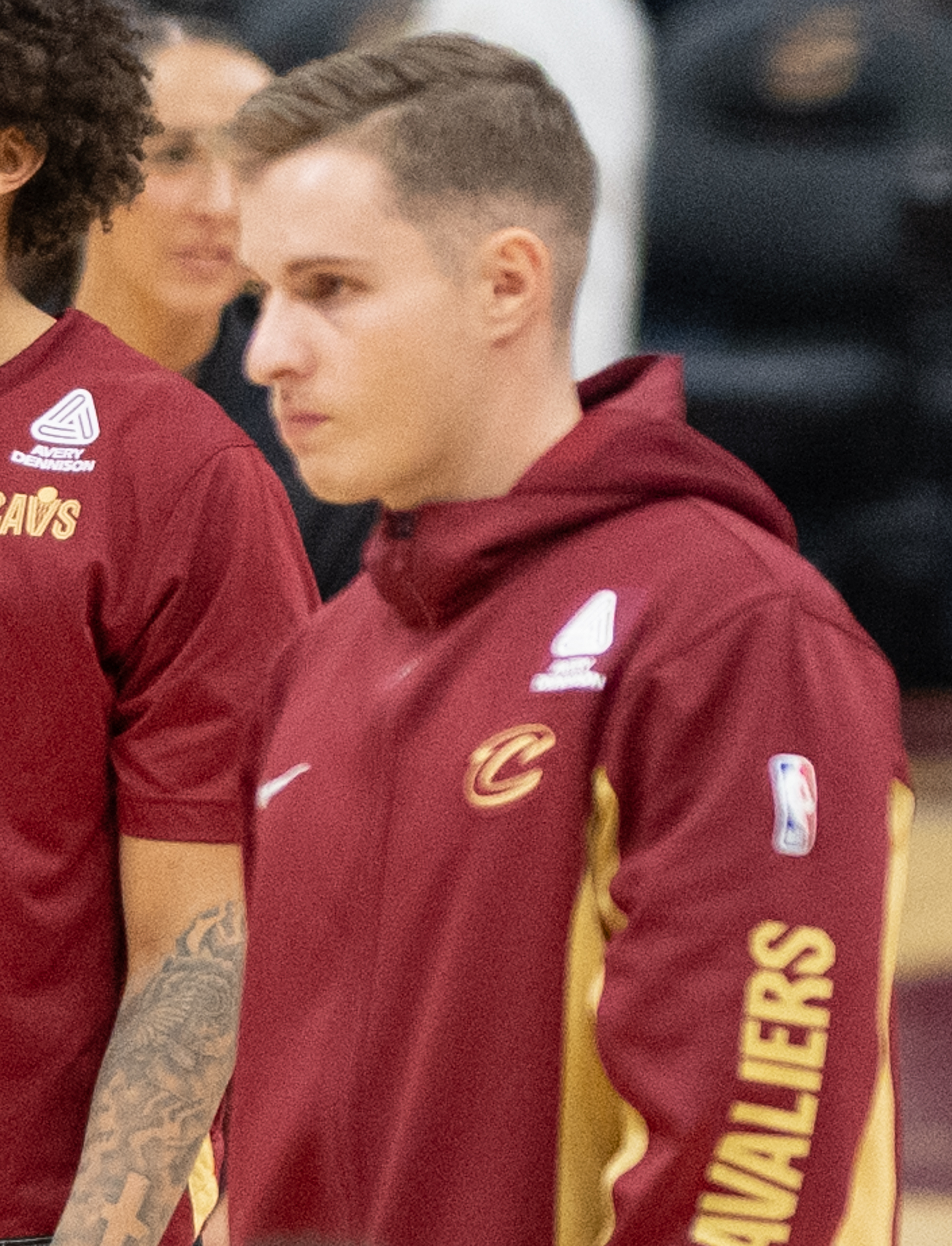
- Merrill with the Cleveland Cavaliers in 2023

No. 5 – Cleveland Cavaliers
- Position: Shooting guard
- League: NBA

Personal information
- Born: May 15, 1996 (age 30) Ames, Iowa, U.S.
- Listed height: 6 ft 4 in (1.93 m)
- Listed weight: 195 lb (88 kg)

Career information
- High school: Bountiful (Bountiful, Utah)
- College: Utah State (2016–2020)
- NBA draft: 2020: 2nd round, 60th overall pick
- Drafted by: New Orleans Pelicans
- Playing career: 2020–present

Career history
- 2020–2021: Milwaukee Bucks
- 2021: →Memphis Hustle
- 2021–2022: Memphis Grizzlies
- 2021: →Memphis Hustle
- 2022–2023: Cleveland Charge
- 2023–present: Cleveland Cavaliers

Career highlights
- NBA champion (2021); AP Honorable Mention All-American (2019); Mountain West Player of the Year (2019); 2× First-team All-Mountain West (2019, 2020); Third-team All-Mountain West (2018); 2× Mountain West tournament MVP (2019, 2020)
- Stats at NBA.com
- Stats at Basketball Reference

Samuel Hoskins Merrill (born May 15, 1996) is an American professional basketball player for the Cleveland Cavaliers of the National Basketball Association (NBA). Nicknamed “Money Merrill,” and "the Key,” by Tim Legler, he was drafted with the last pick of the 2020 NBA draft and acquired by the Milwaukee Bucks, with whom he won an NBA championship. He played college basketball for the Utah State Aggies.

== Early life ==
Merrill is the son of John and Jenny Merrill and has an older sister, Molli. He grew up in Bountiful, Utah and attended Bountiful High School. He became a starter as a sophomore at the midpoint in the season and averaged 6.5 points per game and 2.6 assists. As a junior, Merrill averaged 18.3 points, 6.8 rebounds, 5.4 assists and 2.2 steals per game and was named first-team all-state by the Deseret News and The Salt Lake Tribune. He posted 15.8 points, 7.4 assists, 4.6 rebounds and 2.3 steals per game as a senior and led Bountiful to a 4A state title. Merrill was recruited by Stanford and Princeton but committed to USU.

== College career ==
Merrill went on a two-year mission for the Church of Jesus Christ of Latter-day Saints to Nicaragua before his freshman year at Utah State University. When he returned, head coach Stew Morrill retired and was replaced by Tim Duryea. Merrill posted 9.4 points per game as a freshman.

In his sophomore season, Merrill averaged 16.3 points per game for the Aggies. He was named Third-team All-Mountain West Conference (MWC). Merrill married soccer player Kanyan Ward in May 2018.

As a junior, Merrill averaged 20.9 points, 4.2 assists, 3.9 rebounds and 1.1 steals per game. He shot 46.1 percent from the floor, 37.6 percent from behind the three-point line, and 90.9 percent from the free throw line. Merrill led USU to a Mountain West tournament championship, securing the automatic bid to the NCAA tournament. He was named the MWC Player of the Year and tournament MVP, as well as AP Honorable Mention All-American. Merrill had a career-high 38 points on March 5, 2019, in a 100–96 overtime victory over Colorado State University (CSU).

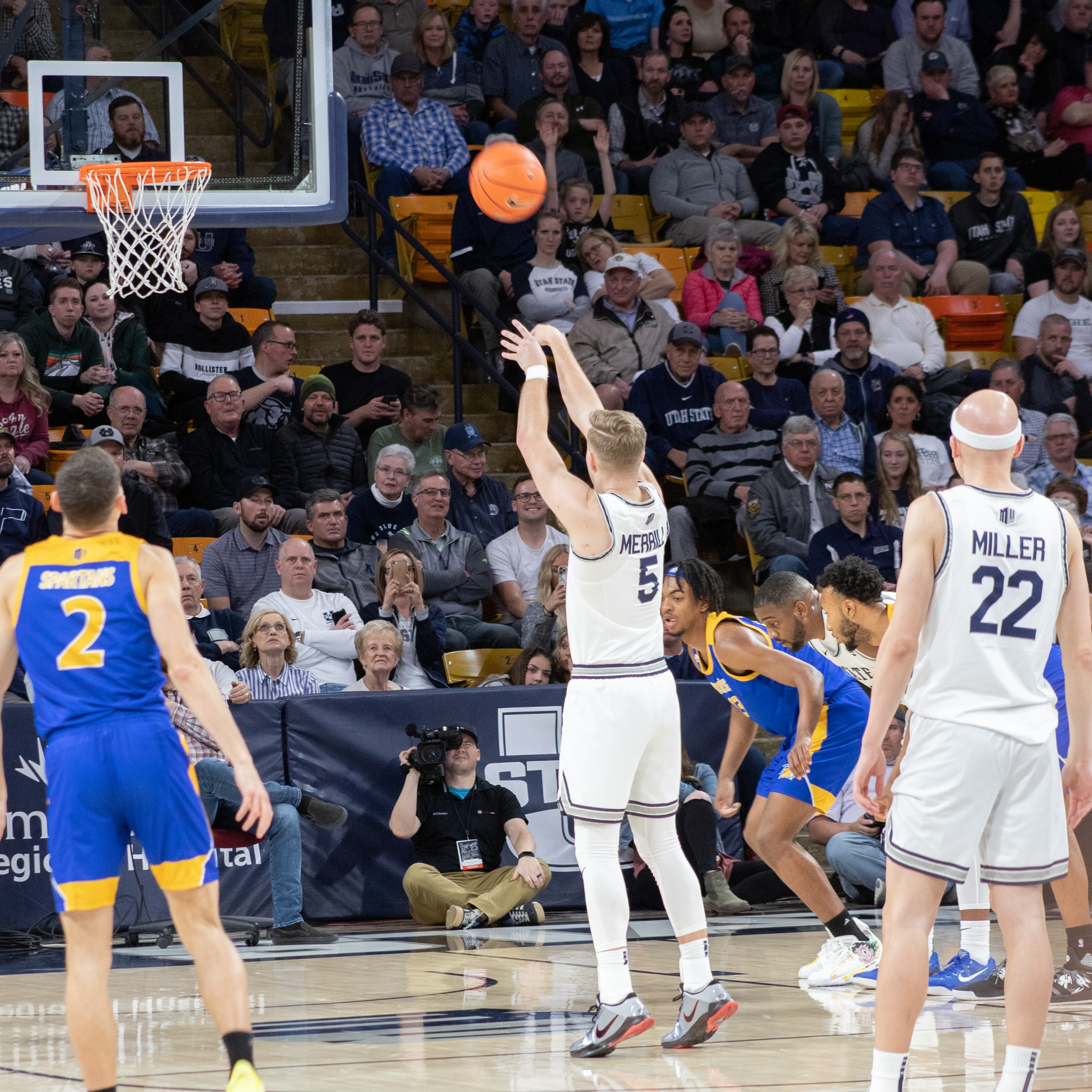
Merrill at Utah State in 2020

In the season-opener of his senior year, Merrill had 28 points to help USU defeat Montana State 81–73. On February 11, versus CSU, Merrill eclipsed the 2,000-point mark for his career and passed Wayne Estes for third on USU's all-time scoring list. He finished with 32 points and five assists in a 75–72 win. At the conclusion of the regular season, Merrill was named First Team All-MWC. Merrill led USU to another MWC tournament championship, securing the automatic bid to the NCAA tournament, and was named MWC tournament MVP. The tournament was canceled because of the COVID-19 pandemic soon after his final game, where he scored 27 points in a 59–56 upset of San Diego State in the tournament final and hit the game-winning three-pointer with 2.5 seconds remaining.

== Professional career ==
=== Milwaukee Bucks (2020–2021) ===
On November 18, 2020, Merrill was selected by the New Orleans Pelicans as the final pick of the 2020 NBA draft.

On November 24, Merrill was traded to the Milwaukee Bucks as part of a four-team trade involving the Oklahoma City Thunder and the Denver Nuggets. He was assigned to the Memphis Hustle of the NBA G League to start the G League season, making his Hustle debut on February 10, 2021. In the regular season he played in 30 games for the Bucks and started two while averaging 3.0 points and 1.0 rebounds and shooting 44.7% from three, in 7.8 minutes per game. On the Bucks' playoff run, Merrill appeared in 8 games, averaging 3.8 minutes and 0.6 points and rebounds per game. Merrill ended his rookie season as an NBA champion when the Bucks defeated the Phoenix Suns in six games in the 2021 NBA Finals.

=== Memphis Grizzlies (2021–2022) ===
On August 7, 2021, Merrill was traded, along with two future second-round picks, to the Memphis Grizzlies in exchange for Grayson Allen. On January 1, 2022, he was waived. Merrill averaged 4.2 points and 1.2 rebounds per game in 6 games for the Grizzlies.

=== Cleveland Charge / Cavaliers (2022–present) ===
On August 13, 2022, Merrill signed with the Sacramento Kings. He was waived prior to the start of the season.

On October 24, 2022, Merrill joined the Cleveland Charge's training camp roster. He was the No. 1 overall pick in the G League draft two days earlier.

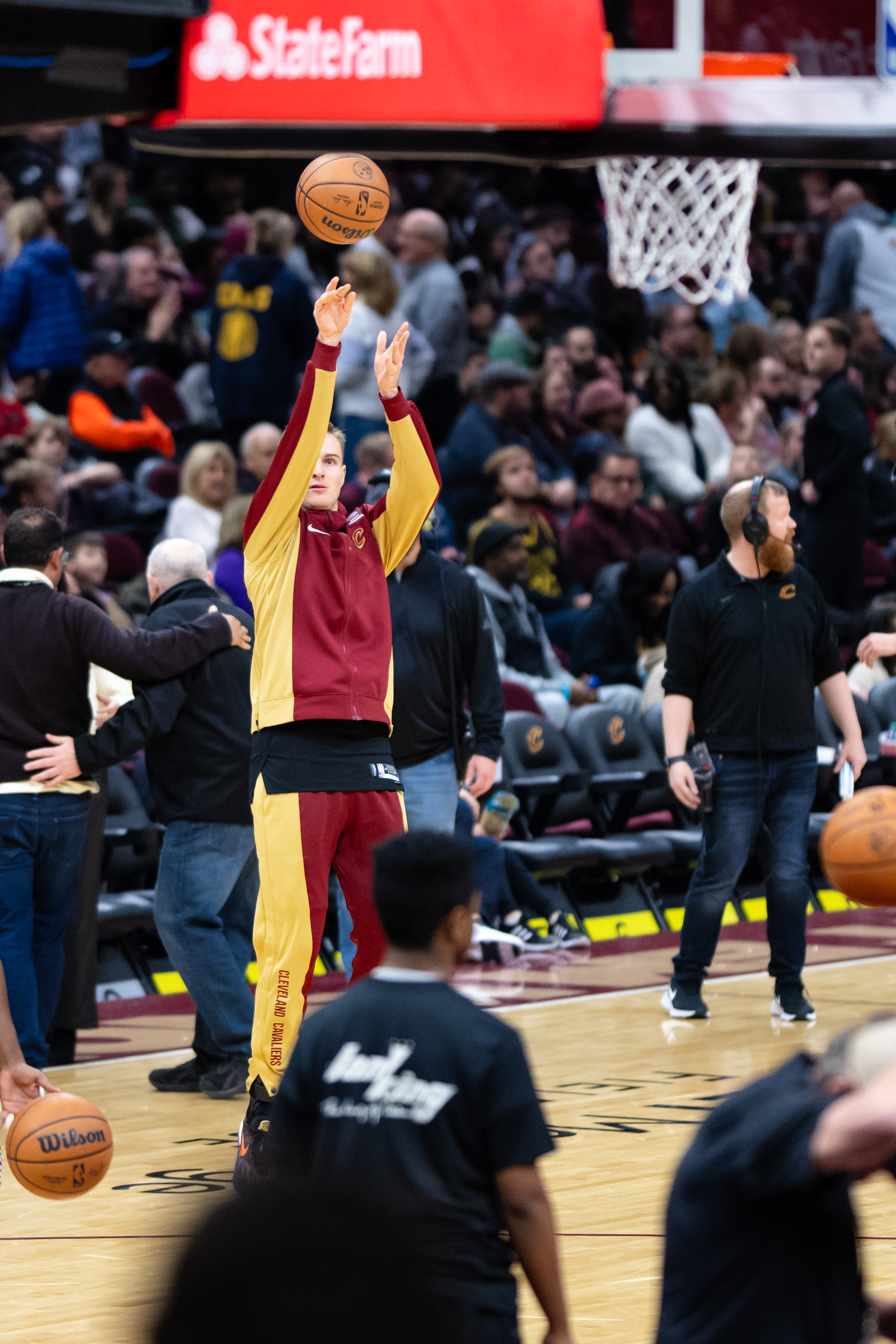
Merrill pregame in 2023

On March 3, 2023, Merrill signed a 10-day contract with the Cleveland Cavaliers. On March 14, he signed a multi-year contract with the Cavaliers. On December 20, he scored 27 points and hit 8 three-pointers off the bench as the Cleveland Cavaliers beat the Utah Jazz 124–116. On January 22, 2024, he scored 26 points, including a career-high 20 in the first half, in a 126–99 win over the Orlando Magic, helping lead Cleveland to its eighth straight win. Merrill broke the franchise record for most bench three-pointers in a season on March 27, 2024. It was his 129th three-pointer off the bench for the 2023–24 season, breaking Donyell Marshall's previous record that was set during the 2005–06 season.

On June 28, 2025, Merrill re-signed with the Cavaliers on a four-year, $38 million contract. On February 11, 2026, Merrill scored a career-high 32 points, 26 of which came in the first half, in a 138-113 blowout win over the Washington Wizards. Merrill nearly shot a perfect game, shooting a perfect 9-of-9 in the first half and 11-of-12 for the entire game. On May 17, 2026, Merrill scored a playoff career-high 23 points against the Detroit Pistons in Game 7 of the Eastern Conference Semifinals. His performance in this game was the 12th most points scored by a Cavaliers reserve in a playoff game since starters began being tracked in 1970-1971 season.

== Personal life ==
In May 2018, Merrill married Kanyan Ward. In November 2021, the couple announced they were having a baby girl and in May 2022 their daughter Kendall was born. Their second child, a girl, was born in February 2025, and their third child, a son, was born January 2026. Merrill is a member of the Church of Jesus Christ of Latter-day Saints, and served a two-year mission in Nicaragua.

== Career statistics ==
Legend
| GP | Games played | GS | Games started | MPG | Minutes per game |
| FG% | Field goal percentage | 3P% | 3-point field goal percentage | FT% | Free throw percentage |
| RPG | Rebounds per game | APG | Assists per game | SPG | Steals per game |
| BPG | Blocks per game | PPG | Points per game | **Bold** | Career high |
| † | Won an NBA championship |

=== NBA ===
==== Regular season ====
| Year | Team | GP | GS | MPG | FG% | 3P% | FT% | RPG | APG | SPG | BPG | PPG |
|---|---|---|---|---|---|---|---|---|---|---|---|---|
| 2020–21† | Milwaukee | 30 | 2 | 7.8 | .444 | **.447** | **1.000** | 1.0 | .7 | .3 | .0 | 3.0 |
| 2021–22 | Memphis | 6 | 0 | 9.6 | .333 | .304 | .500 | 1.2 | .7 | .0 | .0 | 4.2 |
| 2022–23 | Cleveland | 5 | 0 | 11.7 | .409 | .278 | **1.000** | 1.8 | 1.0 | **.8** | .0 | 5.0 |
| 2023–24 | Cleveland | 61 | 1 | 17.5 | .402 | .404 | .929 | 2.0 | 1.8 | .3 | .1 | 8.0 |
| 2024–25 | Cleveland | **71** | 4 | 19.7 | .406 | .372 | .966 | 2.2 | 1.5 | .7 | **.2** | 7.2 |
| 2025–26 | Cleveland | 52 | **38** | **26.5** | **.461** | .421 | .855 | **2.6** | **2.4** | .6 | .1 | **12.8** |
| Career | | 225 | 45 | 18.7 | .424 | .397 | .890 | 2.0 | 1.6 | .5 | .1 | 8.0 |

==== Playoffs ====
| Year | Team | GP | GS | MPG | FG% | 3P% | FT% | RPG | APG | SPG | BPG | PPG |
|---|---|---|---|---|---|---|---|---|---|---|---|---|
| 2021† | Milwaukee | 8 | 0 | 3.7 | .286 | .200 | — | .6 | .1 | **.5** | .0 | .6 |
| 2024 | Cleveland | 10 | 0 | 12.5 | .345 | .370 | **1.000** | 1.2 | .9 | .0 | .0 | 3.3 |
| 2025 | Cleveland | 8 | **3** | **19.9** | .375 | .359 | .667 | **2.5** | **1.8** | **.5** | **.3** | 5.8 |
| 2026 | Cleveland | **17** | 0 | **19.9** | **.427** | **.372** | .840 | 1.2 | 1.1 | **.5** | .0 | **7.8** |
| Career | | 43 | 3 | 15.2 | .395 | .362 | .839 | 1.3 | 1.0 | .4 | .0 | 5.0 |

=== College ===
| Year | Team | GP | GS | MPG | FG% | 3P% | FT% | RPG | APG | SPG | BPG | PPG |
|---|---|---|---|---|---|---|---|---|---|---|---|---|
| 2016–17 | Utah State | 31 | 18 | 26.2 | .450 | .451 | .878 | 3.0 | 3.2 | .9 | .2 | 9.1 |
| 2017–18 | Utah State | 34 | 33 | **35.4** | **.504** | **.464** | .849 | 3.3 | 3.1 | 1.0 | .2 | 16.3 |
| 2018–19 | Utah State | **35** | **35** | 35.3 | .461 | .376 | **.909** | 3.9 | **4.2** | **1.1** | **.3** | **20.9** |
| 2019–20 | Utah State | 32 | 32 | 35.0 | .461 | .410 | .893 | **4.1** | 3.9 | .9 | .1 | 19.7 |
| Career | | 132 | 118 | 33.1 | .470 | .420 | .891 | 3.6 | 3.6 | 1.0 | .2 | 16.6 |

== See also ==
- List of NBA career 3-point field goal percentage leaders
