= For the People =

For the People may refer to:

== Music ==
- For the People (Jerome Cooper album), 1980
- For the People (Boot Camp Clik album), 1997
- For the People (Dropkick Murphys album), 2025

== Politics and government ==
- For the People (Georgia), a political party in Georgia
- For the People (Slovakia), a political party in Slovakia
- For the People Act, a 2019 bill of the 116th U.S. Congress
- "For the People", a slogan used by the Kamala Harris 2020 presidential campaign

== Radio ==
- For the People (KVNU radio program), broadcast since 2006

== Television ==
- For the People (1965 TV series)
- For the People (2002 TV series)
- For the People (2018 TV series)

== See also ==
- By the People (disambiguation)
- Of the people, by the people, for the people, popular phrase from Lincoln's Gettysburg Address
- "4 the people" (KARK), slogan of KARK-TV, Little Rock, Arkansas, USA
- 4 the People, a 2004 Indian Malayalam-language film, first in The People series
  - Of the People, a 2008 Indian Malayalam-language film, third in the series, following By the People (2005)
