= KKEX =

- Preston, Idaho; United States
- Broadcast area: Logan-Ogden, Utah
- Frequency: 96.7 MHz (HD Radio)
- Branding: KIX 96

Programming
- Format: Country
- Subchannels: HD2: "104.9 The Ranch" (Classic country); HD3: "Lite 103.3" (Soft AC)
- Affiliations: Westwood One

Ownership
- Owner: Cache Valley Media Group; (Sun Valley Radio, Inc.)
- Sister stations: KBLQ-FM, KGNT, KLGN, KLZX, KVFX, KVNU

History
- First air date: December 9, 1993 (as KACH)
- Former call signs: KQBD (8/9/1991-8/22/1991, CP); KACH (1991–1994)

Technical information
- Licensing authority: FCC
- Facility ID: 63834
- Class: C1
- ERP: 100,000 watts
- HAAT: 66 meters
- Transmitter coordinates: 41°52′18″N 111°48′31″W
- Repeater: See § Translators and booster

Links
- Public license information: Public file; LMS
- Webcast: Listen live; HD2: Listen live; HD3: Listen live
- Website: kix96fm.com; HD2:104theranch.net; HD3:litefm1033.com

KKEX (96.7 FM) is a radio station licensed to Preston, Idaho, United States, the station serves the Ogden-Clearfield metropolitan area. The station is currently owned by Cache Valley Media Group.

KKEX carries its programming in HD, and has one subchannel. HD-1 is KKEX-HD, and HD-2 carries a Classic country format, 104.5 The Ranch.

== History ==
The station was assigned the call letters KQBD on 1991-08-09. On 1991-08-22, the station changed its call sign to KACH-FM and on 1994-07-20 it changed to the current KKEX.

== Translators and booster ==
In addition to the main station, KKEX is relayed by translators and a booster to widen its broadcast area.

| Call sign | Frequency | City of license | FID | ERP (W) | FCC info | Notes |
|---|---|---|---|---|---|---|
| K256BB | 99.1 FM | North Ogden, Utah | 157646 | 24 | LMS | |
| K285GC | 104.9 FM | Tremonton, Utah | 144766 | 250 | LMS | Relays HD2 |
| KKEX-FM1 | 96.7 FM | Tremonton, Utah | 123317 | 11,500 | LMS | Booster |
| K267AU | 101.3 FM | Wellsville, Utah | 157322 | 250 | LMS | |
| K277BD | 103.3 FM | Weston, Idaho | 157704 | 250 | LMS | Relays HD3 |
