= For the People (KVNU radio program) =

- Genre: Talk show
- Running time: 2 hours
- Country of origin: United States
- Home station: KVNU, Logan, Utah
- Hosted by: Jason Williams and Marc Neilsen
- Original release: 2006 – present
- Opening theme: Knights of Cydonia by MUSE
- Website: kvnutalk.com/for-the-people

For the People is a news and political radio talk show that airs on KVNU in Logan, Utah from 4-6 pm Monday-Friday. The show, which debuted on April 28, 2006, is hosted by Jason Williams and Marc Neilsen. The show touches on local, state, and national issues and takes calls from listeners. Interviews are frequently conducted with local and state newsmakers, politicians, and government officials. On Fridays, For the People runs the "Friday News Quiz," in which listeners answer questions about news stories and compete for a $25 gift certificate to a local restaurant. Tickets to basketball games and local cultural events are frequently given out to listeners.

On July 2, 2008, former For the People host and program founder Tom Grover announced he would be leaving the show in August to attend law school at the University of Nebraska. Ryan Yonk, the original co-host of the show, also departed that month to attend school at Georgia State University. He was replaced as co-host by Williams and Neilsen.

== History ==
For the People began as a summer fill-in for KVNU's Full Court Press, a sports talk show. It originally aired from 5-6 pm, and stayed on the air when Full Court Press resumed in fall 2006. In the summer of 2007, the show expanded to 1.5 hours, with an earlier start time of 4:30 pm. That fall, the show expanded again, to its current 2-hour time slot.

== Notable Issues ==
For the People has focused heavily on major local issues since it began. The first of these was the City of Logan's mandatory recycling program in summer 2006, in which residents were required to pay a monthly recycling fee. Both Grover and Yonk were opposed to mandatory recycling.

In August 2006, Utah State Senator Chris Buttars stated on KVNU that Brown v. Board of Education, the landmark 1954 U.S. Supreme Court ruling that declared public school segregation unconstitutional, was "wrong to begin with.". This statement created much controversy, and Buttars later came back on the show to explain his remarks.

In 2007, For the People covered the debate over a private school voucher bill passed by the Utah Legislature, on which a referendum was held in November of that year. For the People hosted two debates on the subject, which were broadcast live during the show. Both Grover and Yonk expressed their opposition to the voucher program.

In 2008, For the People devoted much coverage to Logan Mayor Randy Watts' plan to reclaim inner Logan, or as Grover and Yonk dubbed it, "The War on Rentals." This plan involved enforcing ordinances that banned parking on city-owned "park strips" between the sidewalk and the street in residential areas.

== Election Coverage ==
On November 6, 2007, and February 5, 2008, For the People provided what it termed "The Best Election Coverage in the Entire Free World." This coverage aired live for 6–8 hours on each election night, providing interviews, analysis, and election returns. On November 4, 2008, the show will continue this tradition by broadcasting for at least 8 hours as presidential election results come in.

The presidential campaign of Mitt Romney was a major topic on the show, due to Romney's Utah ties and membership in the LDS Church. Grover was quoted in The New York Times in a story about reaction of LDS members to Romney's campaign.

== Podcast & Webcast ==
For the People has been available on iTunes since shortly after the show began. The show began hosting a webcast on January 6, 2008. The webcast, which features a chat room in which the hosts regularly participate while on air, is hosted by Stickam.

== Blog ==
The show hosts run a blog in conjunction with the For the People radio show. The blog is regularly ranked as one of the Most Influential Blogs in Utah by BlogNetNews. The blog is used to post show audio, inform listeners about upcoming topics, and discuss political issues. Former hosts Tom Grover and Ryan Yonk write occasionally on the blog, as do a stable of contributors. The blog received 14,281 unique visitors in March, 2008.
