= KLGN =

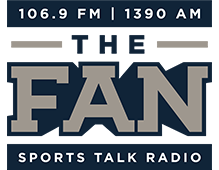
- Logan, Utah; United States
- Broadcast area: Tremonton, Utah; Smithfield, Utah
- Frequency: 1390 kHz
- Branding: 106.9 The Fan

Programming
- Format: Sports

Ownership
- Owner: Sun Valley Radio, Inc.
- Sister stations: KBLQ-FM, KGNT, KKEX, KLZX, KVFX, KVNU

History
- First air date: 1954 (as KBLQ)
- Former call signs: KBLQ (1954–1988)
- Call sign meaning: K LoGaN

Technical information
- Licensing authority: FCC
- Facility ID: 63831
- Class: B
- Power: 5,000 watts day 500 watts night
- Transmitter coordinates: 41°44′4″N 111°51′13″W
- Translator: 106.9 K295CW (Logan)

Links
- Public license information: Public file; LMS
- Webcast: Listen Live
- Website: 1069thefan.com

KLGN (1390 AM) is a radio station broadcasting a sports format. Licensed to Logan, Utah, United States, the station is currently owned by Sun Valley Radio, Inc.

== History ==
The station first signed on the air in 1954, originally operating under the call sign KBLQ. It maintained these call letters for over three decades until January 1, 1988, when it officially transitioned to the current KLGN call sign. The station is currently owned by Sun Valley Radio, Inc., a subsidiary of the Cache Valley Media Group, which operates the station alongside several FM properties in the Northern Utah market. In 2021, the licensee filed for a formal renewal of its broadcast license to ensure continued operations through the end of the decade. Historically, KLGN was known for a "Soft Adult Contemporary" format (often branded as "Lite 1390"), but on October 1, 2018, it shifted to its current sports-talk format. KLGN was known for is collaboration with Utah State University's broadcast journalism department to provide practical experience for students. The station carries Utah State Aggies women's basketball, carrying both home and away games.

== Translators ==
In addition to the main station, KLGN is relayed by a translator on the FM band to widen its broadcast area.

Call sign	Frequency	City of license	FID	ERP (W)	Class	FCC info
K295CW	106.9 FM	Logan, Utah	202565	250	D	LMS
