= KVNU =

Radio station in Logan, Utah

- Logan, Utah; United States
- Broadcast area: Logan metropolitan area
- Frequency: 610 kHz (HD Radio)
- Branding: News Talk KVNU

Programming
- Format: Talk radio
- Network: ABC News Radio
- Affiliations: Compass Media Networks; Premiere Networks; Utah State Aggies; Westwood One

Ownership
- Owner: Cache Valley Media Group; (Sun Valley Radio, Inc.)
- Sister stations: KBLQ-FM, KKEX, KGNT, KLGN, KLZX, KVFX

History
- First air date: November 17, 1938; 87 years ago
- Former frequencies: 1200 kHz (1938–1941); 1230 kHz (1941–1948)
- Call sign meaning: Voice of Northern Utah

Technical information
- Licensing authority: FCC
- Facility ID: 55459
- Class: B
- Power: 10,000 watts day; 1,000 watts night
- Transmitter coordinates: 41°40′29.8″N 111°56′8.8″W
- Translators: 102.1 K271BI (Wellsville); 102.5 K273CY (Smithfield)

Links
- Public license information: Public file; LMS
- Webcast: Listen Live
- Website: kvnutalk.com

KVNU (610 kHz) is a commercial AM radio station licensed to Logan, Utah. It is owned by the Cache Valley Media Group and airs a talk radio format, serving the Logan metropolitan area. KVNU also broadcasts Utah State Aggies sports.

KVNU first signed on in 1938 and was owned by the family of Herschel Bullen until 1996.

== History ==
=== On 1200 kHz (1938–1941) ===
Following a construction permit issued February 19, 1938, KVNU first signed on on November 17, 1938, with a broadcast originating at Brigham Young College. KVNU originally broadcast at 1200 kHz at 100 watts. It was owned by the Cache Valley Broadcasting Company, led by S.L. Billings and other Salt Lake City entrepreneurs; Herschel Bullen and his son Reed became stockholders of KVNU's parent company. In its early years, KVNU had a full service format of news, music, and entertainment and had studios at the Capitol Theatre in Logan.

In 1940, KVNU increased its power from 100 to 250 watts.

=== On 1230 kHz (1941–1948) ===
With the enactment of the North American Regional Broadcasting Agreement (NARBA) in 1941, the frequency moved to 1230 AM.

By 1945, the Bullens had become majority owners of the Cache Valley Broadcasting Company, with Herschel leading the company and Reed moving up from station general manager to company general manager to company director. Reed hosted Man on the Street, a daily 12:15 p.m. live broadcast from a local jewelry business soliciting opinions from members of the public. KVNU also joined the Mutual Broadcasting System by 1945.

Then in 1946, KVNU began broadcasting games of the Utah State Aggies football team of what was then Utah State Agricultural College (now Utah State University). The Billboard 1946–47 Encyclopedia of Music listed three regular music programs on KVNU, including a show devoted to Bing Crosby and a request show sponsored by Sears, Roebuck. KVNU also broadcast some national entertainment programs, such as Chandu the Magician and The Roy Rogers Show.

=== On 610 kHz (1948–present) ===
KVNU moved to its current frequency of 610 kHz in 1948 and raised its power to 1 kW.

In 1958, the Bullen Family was granted a construction permit from the Federal Communications Commission to put a television station on Channel 12 in Logan. The permit was later transferred to the University of Utah to put a public television station on Channel 12.

In 1961, KVNU raised its power from 1 kW to 5 kW. Through the 1960s and 1970s, KVNU was a Top 40 station and an affiliate of the ABC Contemporary Network. In the 1970s, the daytime power was doubled to 10,000 watts. The station was one of the early carriers of the syndicated American Top 40 with Casey Kasem, which it would maintain from 1972 through to the late 1980s.

The Broadcasting Yearbook 1980 listed KVNU as an MOR formatted station. By 1985, KVNU changed its format to adult contemporary. In the late 1980s, KVNU added talk shows to its schedule, with the Broadcasting Yearbook 1987 listing KVNU as an NBC Talknet affiliate.

Reed Bullen retired as KVNU manager in 1986 and transferred the station to his son Jonathan. Then in 1996, the Bullen family sold KVNU to the Cache Valley Media Group. By 1998, KVNU phased out music and became a news/talk station. The 2001 KVNU schedule included local news shows, The Rush Limbaugh Show, and ESPN Radio.

In May 2017, Utah State discontinued its decades-long partnership with KVNU and changed its flagship station to KZNS in Salt Lake City. Utah State student radio station KBLU-LP became the Logan affiliate of the Utah State network. In July 2023, KVNU returned to the Utah State sports network.

== Programming ==
=== Talk shows ===
KVNU is branded as "The Voice of Northern Utah". It has local talk shows on weekday morning (6 to 10 a.m.) and afternoon (4 to 6 p.m.) drive time slots. The rest of the weekday schedule consists of nationally syndicated programming, including Premiere Networks' The Clay Travis and Buck Sexton Show, The Sean Hannity Show, and Coast to Coast AM.

Weekends feature syndicated talk shows and brokered specialty lifestyle shows about topics such as gardening and finance. Syndicated weekend shows include Handel on the Law, At Home with Gary Sullivan, and The Kim Komando Show. KVNU is part of the ABC News Radio network, with ABC's weekly newsmagazine Perspective broadcast Saturday nights.

=== Sports ===
KVNU has live broadcasts of the Utah State Aggies for football and men's basketball. From 1946 to 2017, KVNU had first broadcast Utah State sports. KVNU resumed Utah State sports broadcasts in 2023 after a six-year absence.

KVNU has also broadcast Logan High School football since the 1940s.

== Technical information ==
The KVNU studios are located at the Cache Valley Media Group offices near the intersection of Utah State Routes 30 and 252.

By day, KVNU is powered at 10,000 watts non-directional. At night, to protect other stations on 610 AM from interference, it reduces power to 1,000 watts and switches to a directional antenna. KVNU has a construction permit to boost its daytime power to 22,000 watts. The AM transmitter is off West 3800 South in Benson, Utah, near the Little Bear River. Programming is also heard on FM translators at 102.1 MHz in Wellsville, 102.5 MHz in Smithfield, 98.3 in Tremonton, Utah and 93.5 in Laketown, Utah.

== Translators ==
In addition to the main station, KVNU is relayed by two FM translators to widen its coverage area.

Call sign	Frequency	City of license	FID	ERP (W)	Class	FCC info
K271BI	102.1 FM	Wellsville, Utah	157293	210 vertical	D	LMS
K273CY	102.5 FM	Smithfield, Utah	146317	84 vertical	D	LMS
