= KVFX =

Radio station in Logan–Salt Lake City, Utah

- Logan, Utah; United States
- Broadcast area: Logan, Utah; Ogden, Utah; Bear Lake, Utah
- Frequency: 94.5 MHz (HD Radio)
- Branding: 94.5 UtahsVFX

Programming
- Format: Top 40 (CHR)
- Subchannels: HD2: KBLQ-FM (Adult contemporary); HD3: KKEX (Country)
- Affiliations: Iliad Media Group; Compass Media Networks

Ownership
- Owner: Cache Valley Media Group; (Sun Valley Radio, Inc.)
- Sister stations: KBLQ-FM, KGNT, KKEX, KLGN, KLZX, KVNU

History
- Former call signs: KVWJ (1974–1978); KJKJ (1978–1982); KMXL (1982–1984); KVFM (1984–1997)

Technical information
- Licensing authority: FCC
- Facility ID: 55458
- Class: C0
- ERP: 94,000 watts
- HAAT: 350 meters
- Repeater: See § Translators and booster

Links
- Public license information: Public file; LMS
- Webcast: Listen Live
- Website: utahsvfx.com

KVFX (94.5 FM), also known as VFX, is a Top 40 (CHR) radio station broadcasting in the Logan-Ogden, Utah metropolitan area. It is owned by Cache Valley Media Group. KVFX-FM also broadcasts via translator in Tremonton at 98.3 MHz. The Station has been branded as "Utah's VFX". The station's studios are in Logan and the main transmitter (for 94.5 FM) is in Newton with a booster on 94.5 FM in Tremonton.

== History ==
The station began as KVWJ in 1975 with a Top 40 and album rock format. In 1979 it changed its format to country and changed its call letters to KJKJ-FM. The transmitter and studios were sold in 1982. The new station, with a Top 40 and adult-oriented rock (AOR) format, was assigned the call letters KMXL on May 17, 1982. On May 16, 1984, the station changed its call sign to KVFM and on December 15, 1997 to the current KVFX.

KVFX began broadcasting in HD Radio in 2022.

== Translators and booster ==
Broadcast translators for KVFX-HD
Call sign	Frequency	City of license	FID	ERP (W)	FCC info	Notes
K272AX	102.3 FM	Laketown-Garden City, Utah	56111	30	LMS	
K288BU	105.5 FM	Randolph-Woodruff, Utah	56109	30	LMS	
K265FA	100.9 FM	Richmond, Utah	157245	250	LMS	
K252EL	98.3 FM	Tremonton, Utah	146355	180	LMS	
KVFX-FM1	94.5 FM	Tremonton, Utah	123318	11,400	LMS	Booster
