= KBLQ-FM =

- Logan, Utah; United States
- Broadcast area: Ogden/Logan, Utah
- Frequency: 92.9 MHz
- Branding: Q92

Programming
- Format: Adult contemporary
- Affiliations: Westwood One

Ownership
- Owner: Sun Valley Radio, Incorporated
- Sister stations: KGNT, KKEX, KLGN, KLZX, KVFX, KVNU

History
- First air date: August 1977

Technical information
- Licensing authority: FCC
- Facility ID: 63832
- Class: C1
- ERP: 100,000 watts
- HAAT: 63 meters (207 ft)
- Transmitter coordinates: 41°52′18″N 111°48′31″W
- Repeater: See § Translators and booster

Links
- Public license information: Public file; LMS
- Webcast: Listen Live
- Website: q92.fm

KBLQ-FM (92.9 FM, "Q92") is a radio station broadcasting an adult contemporary format. Licensed to Logan, Utah, United States, it serves the Logan area. The station is currently owned by Sun Valley Radio incorporated.

== Translators and booster ==
In addition to the main station, KBLQ is relayed by an additional five translators and a booster to widen its broadcast area.

Call sign	Frequency	City of license	FID	ERP (W)	FCC info	Notes
K260CF	99.9 FM	Pocatello, Idaho	145799	25	LMS	
K221AX	92.1 FM	Laketown-Garden City, Utah	56116	12	LMS	
K227CO	93.3 FM	Logan, Utah	143532	18	LMS	
KBLQ-FM1	92.9 FM	Tremonton, Utah	123319	11,400	LMS	Booster
K275AV	102.9 FM	Wellsville, Utah	157279	250	LMS	
K275AB	102.9 FM	Freedom, Wyoming	38925	10	LMS	
