= By the People =

By the People may refer to:

- A Gettysburg Address phrase: "government of the people, by the people, for the people"
- By the People (2005 film), an Indian Malayalam-language film, sequel to 4 the People (2004), second in The People series
- By the People: The Election of Barack Obama, a 2009 documentary on the election on Barack Obama to the presidency of the United States

== See also ==
- For the People (disambiguation)
- Of the People, 2008 Indian Malayalam-language film, sequel to By the People, third in the series
