= Bert Cook (basketball) =

American basketball player (1929–1998)

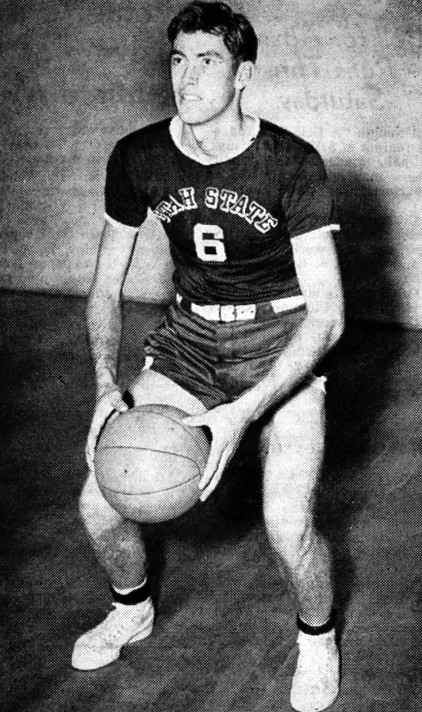

Personal information
- Born: April 26, 1929 Weber County, Utah, U.S.
- Died: November 24, 1994 (aged 65) Roy, Utah, U.S.
- Listed height: 6 ft 3 in (1.91 m)
- Listed weight: 185 lb (84 kg)

Career information
- High school: Weber County (Weber County, Utah)
- College: Utah State (1950–1952)
- NBA draft: 1952: 4th round, 35th overall pick
- Drafted by: New York Knicks
- Playing career: 1954–1955
- Position: Shooting guard
- Number: 5

Career history
- 1954–1955: New York Knicks

Career highlights
- No. 6 retired by Utah State Aggies

Career NBA statistics
- Points: 118 (3.2 ppg)
- Rebounds: 72 (1.9 rpg)
- Assists: 33 (0.9 apg)
- Stats at NBA.com
- Stats at Basketball Reference

Bertram Eugene Cook (April 26, 1929 – November 24, 1998) was an American professional basketball player. Cook was selected in the 1952 NBA draft by the New York Knicks after a collegiate career at Utah State. He played for the Knicks in 37 games during the 1954–55 season.

== Career statistics ==
Legend
GP	Games played	GS	Games started	MPG	Minutes per game
FG%	Field goal percentage	3P%	3-point field goal percentage	FT%	Free throw percentage
RPG	Rebounds per game	APG	Assists per game	SPG	Steals per game
BPG	Blocks per game	PPG	Points per game	**Bold**	Career high

=== NBA ===
==== Regular season ====
Year	Team	GP	MPG	FG%	FT%	RPG	APG	PPG
1954–55	New York	37	11.5	.316	.680	1.9	.9	3.2

==== Playoffs ====
Year	Team	GP	MPG	FG%	FT%	RPG	APG	PPG
1955	New York	1	20.0	.667	.000	.0	2.0	8.0
