= KGNT =

- Smithfield, Utah; United States
- Broadcast area: Logan, Utah
- Frequency: 103.9 MHz
- Branding: Kool 103.9

Programming
- Format: Classic hits
- Affiliations: Westwood One

Ownership
- Owner: Frandsen Media Company, LLC
- Sister stations: KBLQ-FM; KKEX; KLGN; KLZX; KVFX; KVNU

History
- First air date: February 1983
- Former call signs: KVEZ (1983–1993); KNUC (1993–1998); KGNT (1998–2001); KBET (7/2001-8/2001)

Technical information
- Licensing authority: FCC
- Facility ID: 38274
- Class: A
- ERP: 6,000 watts
- HAAT: −47 meters (−154 ft)
- Transmitter coordinates: 41°48′44″N 111°47′30″W
- Translator: 107.3 K297AP (Tremonton)

Links
- Public license information: Public file; LMS
- Webcast: Listen live
- Website: kool1039.com

KGNT (103.9 FM; "Kool 103.9") is a classic hits formatted radio station located in Logan, Utah. It is licensed to Smithfield, Utah and owned by Frandsen Media Company, LLC. The station features programming from Westwood One. The station advertises itself as playing "an upbeat mix of classic hits from the 70s, 80s, & 90s."

== History ==
The station first began broadcasting on February 10, 1983, under the call sign KVEZ. After a decade of operation, the call letters were changed to KNUC on September 1, 1993, and eventually to the current KGNT on March 1, 1998. In a brief identity shift during the summer of 2001, the station adopted the call sign KBET on July 20, but reverted to KGNT less than a month later on August 16.

The station is owned by Frandsen Media Company, LLC, which also operates several sister stations in the region, including KVNU and KKEX. In May 2021, the licensee filed for a standard broadcast license renewal with the Federal Communications Commission to continue its service to the Smithfield and Logan areas.
