= KLZX =

- Weston, Idaho; United States
- Broadcast area: Preston, Idaho and Logan, Utah
- Frequency: 95.9 MHz (HD Radio)
- Branding: 95.9 KLZX

Programming
- Format: Classic rock
- Subchannels: HD2: Juan 97.3 (Spanish CHR)

Ownership
- Owner: Sun Valley Radio Inc
- Sister stations: KBLQ-FM, KGNT, KKEX, KLGN, KVFX, KVNU

History
- First air date: 2000
- Former call signs: KFCX (May 2000-Aug 2000, CP)

Technical information
- Licensing authority: FCC
- Facility ID: 88184
- Class: C3
- ERP: 25,000 watts
- HAAT: 66 meters (217 ft)
- Transmitter coordinates: 41°52′18″N 111°48′31″W
- Repeater: See § Translators and booster

Links
- Public license information: Public file; LMS
- Webcast: Listen live; HD2: Listen live
- Website: www.klzxfm.com; HD2: juan973.com

KLZX (95.9 FM) is a radio station broadcasting a classic rock format. Licensed to Weston, Idaho, United States, the station is currently owned by Sun Valley Radio Inc. The station is also broadcast on HD radio. According to Radio-Locator, the transmitter for KLZX is located in northern Utah. KLZX can be heard regularly in Salt Lake City, via its booster signal (KLZX-1) broadcasting near Tremonton, Utah. The booster also carries the station's HD Radio signals.

== History ==
The station was assigned the calls KFCX on May 2, 2000. On August 25, 2000, the station changed its call sign to the current KLZX.

== Translators and booster ==
In addition to the main station, KLZX is relayed by translators and a booster to widen its broadcast area.

Call sign	Frequency	City of license	FID	ERP (W)	FCC info	Notes
K287AB	105.3 FM	Montpelier, Idaho	4401	10	LMS	
K247CG	97.3 FM	Amalga, Utah	144800	250	LMS	Relays HD2 (Juan 97.3)
K299BO	107.7 FM	Hyde Park, Utah	144783	190	LMS	
K236CB	95.1 FM	Tremonton, Utah	146450	250	LMS	
KLZX-FM1	95.9 FM	Tremonton, Utah	163417	5,000	LMS	Booster
