= Wayne Estes =

American basketball player (1943–1965)

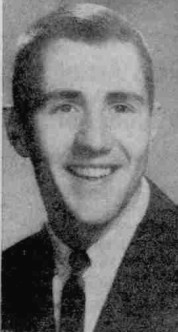

Personal information
- Born: May 13, 1943 Virginia City, Montana, U.S.
- Died: February 8, 1965 (aged 21) Logan, Utah, U.S.
- Listed height: 6 ft 6 in (1.98 m)

Career information
- High school: Anaconda (Anaconda, Montana)
- College: Utah State (1962–1965)
- Position: Forward

Career highlights
- Consensus second-team All-American (1965); No. 33 retired by Utah State Aggies
- Collegiate Basketball Hall of Fame

Wayne Vernon Estes (May 13, 1943 – February 8, 1965) was an American basketball player. He was a 6-foot-6-inch (1.98 m) All-American forward for the Utah State Aggies from 1962 to 1965.

== High school ==
Estes earned all-state honors in three sports for the Anaconda Copperheads: football, basketball, and track. Estes earned three letters in football and basketball (freshmen could not play varsity football or basketball at the time) and four letters in track.

Estes was the Montana state class A champion discus and shot put thrower in his senior season. He still holds the Anaconda high school shot put record with a mark of 59' 4.5".

During his high school basketball career, Estes scored 1,430 points. Only Minneapolis Lakers Center Ed Kalafat, who racked up 1,561 points, outscored Estes while at Anaconda High School.

== Accidental death ==
On the night of February 8, 1965, Estes played what would be the last game of his college career, against the University of Denver in the Nelson Field House. Estes scored 48 points, surpassing 2,000 points in his career.

Bounce pass to Estes. Puts the ball behind his back. Turns and looks out front to Hal Hale…(Estes) looks at his defense, pushes, and it's…in! Oh, great! Wayne Estes has now scored two-thousand points in a three-year career.
—Play-by-play announcer Reid Andreasen, KVNU Radio, Feb. 8, 1965

After the game, Estes and some friends stopped at the scene of a car accident near campus. While crossing the street, Estes brushed against a downed high-voltage power line and was fatally electrocuted. Estes would likely have been a high draft pick in the National Basketball Association (NBA) in 1965. The Los Angeles Lakers had intended to draft him in the first round. Estes was posthumously named an All-American by the Associated Press and also earned a posthumous consensus Second Team All-American distinction. The Aggies posthumously retired his number #33. Estes is buried in the Sunset Memorial cemetery near Fairmont, Montana just southeast of Anaconda.

== Wayne Estes Center ==
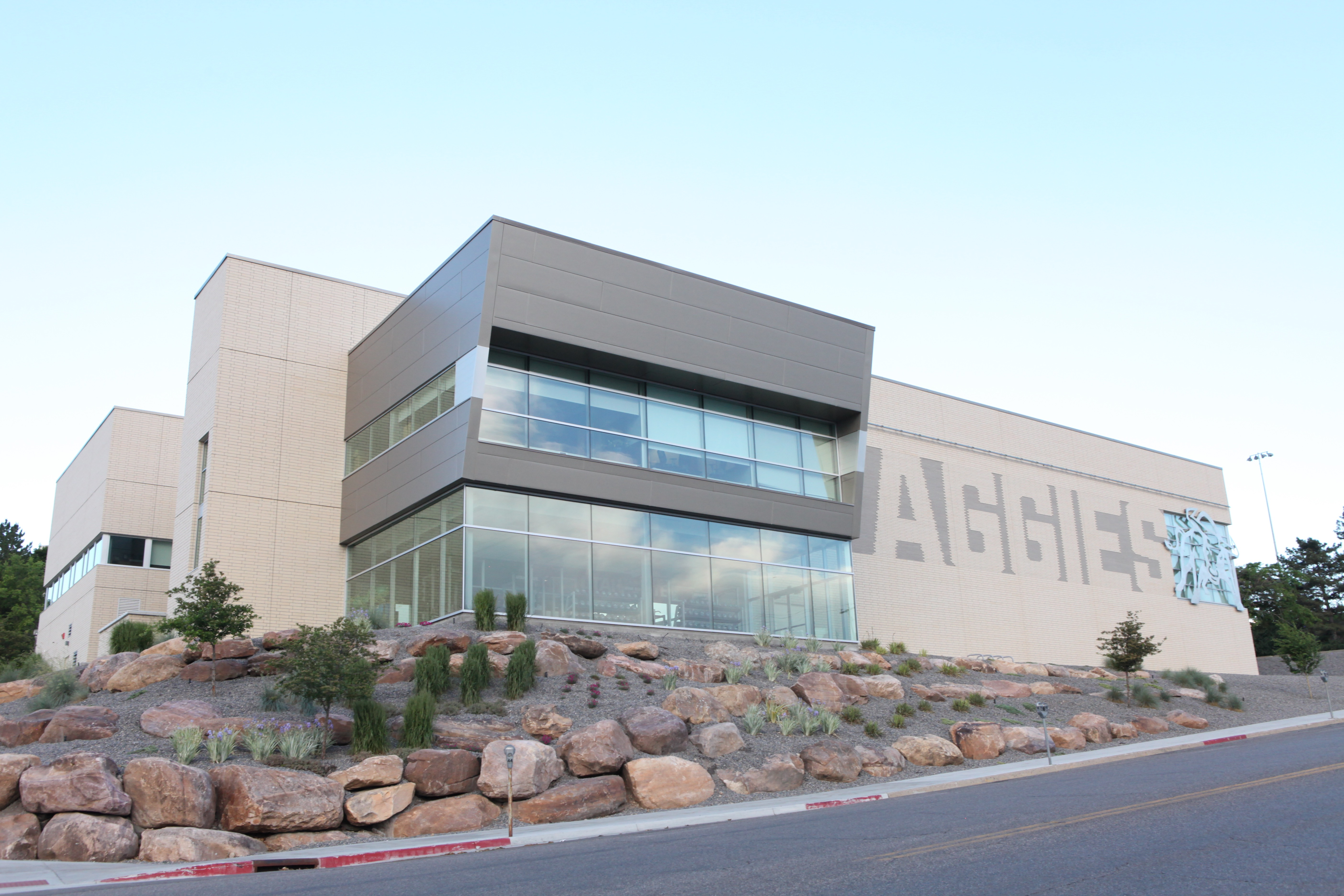
Wayne Estes Center

In May 2013, Utah State University announced the construction of the $9.7 million Wayne Estes Center, which will serve as a practice facility for the Utah State University Aggies men's and women's basketball teams and house a competition venue for the women's volleyball team. The foyer features a visual tribute to Wayne Estes. Jim and Carol Laub's $5.25 million gift and Blake Kirby's $1.3 million gift made the center possible. Groundbreaking was held in June 2013, and the facility was completed in September 2014.

== Career statistics ==
Legend
| GP | Games played | GS | Games started | MPG | Minutes per game |
| FG% | Field goal percentage | 3P% | 3-point field goal percentage | FT% | Free throw percentage |
| RPG | Rebounds per game | APG | Assists per game | SPG | Steals per game |
| BPG | Blocks per game | PPG | Points per game | **Bold** | Career high |

=== College ===
| Year | Team | GP | FG% | FT% | RPG | PPG |
|---|---|---|---|---|---|---|
| 1962–63 | Utah State | 27 | .479 | .838 | 9.5 | 20.0 |
| 1963–64 | Utah State | **29** | .479 | .853 | 13.0 | 28.3 |
| 1964–65 | Utah State | 19 | **.486** | **.878** | **13.7** | **33.7** |
| **Career** | | 75 | .481 | .856 | 11.9 | 26.7 |

== See also ==
- List of basketball players who died during their careers
