= 2018–19 Utah State Aggies men's basketball team =

American college basketball season

2018–19 Utah State Aggies men's basketball

Mountain West regular season co-champions & tournament champions

NCAA tournament, First Round
- Conference: Mountain West Conference

Ranking
- AP: No. 25
- Record: 28–7 (15–3 MW)
- Head coach: Craig Smith (1st season)
- Assistant coaches: Austin Hansen; Eric Peterson; David Ragland
- Home arena: Smith Spectrum

2018–19 Mountain West Conference men's basketball standings
| | Conf. | | | | Overall |
| Team | W | | L | PCT | W | | L | PCT |
|---|---|---|---|---|---|---|---|---|
| No. 20 Nevada | 15 | – | 3 | .833 | 29 | – | 5 | .853 |
| No. 25 Utah State † | 15 | – | 3 | .833 | 28 | – | 7 | .800 |
| Fresno State | 13 | – | 5 | .722 | 23 | – | 9 | .719 |
| San Diego State | 11 | – | 7 | .611 | 21 | – | 13 | .618 |
| UNLV | 11 | – | 7 | .611 | 17 | – | 14 | .548 |
| Air Force | 8 | – | 10 | .444 | 14 | – | 18 | .438 |
| New Mexico | 7 | – | 11 | .389 | 14 | – | 18 | .438 |
| Boise State | 7 | – | 11 | .389 | 13 | – | 20 | .394 |
| Colorado State | 7 | – | 11 | .389 | 12 | – | 20 | .375 |
| Wyoming | 4 | – | 14 | .222 | 8 | – | 24 | .250 |
| San Jose State | 1 | – | 17 | .056 | 4 | – | 27 | .129 |
† Mountain West Conference tournament winner Rankings from AP Poll

The 2018–19 Utah State Aggies men's basketball team represented Utah State University in the 2018–19 NCAA Division I men's basketball season. The Aggies, led by first-year head coach Craig Smith, played their home games at the Smith Spectrum in Logan, Utah as members of the Mountain West Conference. The Aggies shared the regular-season Mountain West title with Nevada, and defeated New Mexico, Fresno State, and San Diego State to win the Mountain West tournament to earn the Mountain West's automatic bid to the NCAA tournament for their first appearance since 2011. They lost in the first round of the NCAA Tournament to Washington.

== Previous season ==
The Aggies finished the 2017–18 season 17–17 overall and 8–10 in conference play, finishing tied for 7th. In the Mountain West Conference tournament, they defeated Colorado State in the first round and Boise State in the quarterfinals before losing to New Mexico in the semi-finals.

On March 11, 2018, head coach Tim Duryea was fired after three seasons. He finished at Utah State with a three-year record of 47–49. On March 25, reports indicated that the school had hired South Dakota head coach Craig Smith as head coach, which was confirmed the next day.

== Offseason ==
=== Departures ===
| Name | Number | Pos. | Height | Weight | Year | Hometown | Reason for departure |
|---|---|---|---|---|---|---|---|
| DeAngelo Isby | 0 | G | 6'5" | 200 | Junior | Chicago, IL | Declare for 2018 NBA draft |
| Koby McEwen | 1 | G | 6'4" | 200 | Sophomore | Toronto, ON | Transferred to Marquette |
| Julion Pearre | 5 | G | 6'3" | 205 | Senior | McKinney, TX | Graduated |
| Alex Dargenton | 11 | F | 6'8" | 205 | RS Senior | Ford-de-France, Martinque | Graduated |
| Taylor Larson | 13 | G | 6'4" | 210 | Sophomore | Highland, UT | Left the team |
| Norbert Janicek | 15 | F | 6'11" | 250 | Junior | Dražkovce, Slovakia | Left the team for personal reasons |
| Daron Henson | 23 | F | 6'7" | 205 | RS Freshman | Pasadena, CA | Transferred to Salt Lake CC |

=== Incoming transfers ===
| Name | Number | Pos. | Height | Weight | Year | Hometown | Previous college |
|---|---|---|---|---|---|---|---|
| John Knight III | 3 | G | 6'2" | 195 | Sophomore | Jackson, MS | Junior college transferred from Southwest Mississippi CC |
| Ke'Sean Davis | 13 | F | 6'7" | 210 | Sophomore | Los Angeles, CA | Junior college transferred from Seward County CC |
| Roche Grootfaam | 15 | F | 6'8" | 230 | Sophomore | Paramaribo, Suriname | Junior college transferred from College of Southern Idaho |

=== Recruiting ===
College recruiting
| Name | Hometown | School | Height | Weight | Commit date |
|---|---|---|---|---|---|
| Steven Ashworth; PG | Highland, UT | Lone Peak High School | 6 ft 0 in (1.83 m) | 160 lb (73 kg) | |
| Steven Ashworth; PG | Recruit ratings: Scout: Rivals: (NR) | | | | |
| Tauriawn Knight; PG | Edmond, OK | Edmond Santa Fe High School | 6 ft 0 in (1.83 m) | 170 lb (77 kg) | |
| Tauriawn Knight; PG | Recruit ratings: Scout: Rivals: (NR) | | | | |
| Ben Fakira; C | Sydney, Australia | Barker College | 6 ft 10 in (2.08 m) | 250 lb (110 kg) | |
| Ben Fakira; C | Recruit ratings: Scout: Rivals: (NR) | | | | |
Overall recruit ranking: Scout: – Rivals: –
Note: In many cases, Scout, Rivals, 247Sports, On3, and ESPN may conflict in their listings of height and weight.; In these cases, the average was taken. ESPN grades are on a 100-point scale.; Sources: "2018 Team Ranking". Rivals.

== Roster ==
2018–19 Utah State Aggies men's basketball team
Players
Coaches

| Pos. | # | Name | Height | Weight | Year | Previous school | Hometown |
|---|---|---|---|---|---|---|---|
| F | 0 | Klay Stall | 6 ft 10 in (2.08 m) | 240 lb (109 kg) | RS Fr | Basha HS | Chandler, AZ |
| G | 1 | Tauriawn Knight | 6 ft 1 in (1.85 m) | 170 lb (77 kg) | Fr | Edmond Santa Fe HS | Edmond, OK |
| G/F | 2 | Dwayne Brown Jr. | 6 ft 6 in (1.98 m) | 220 lb (100 kg) | Sr | Rockdale County HS; Northern Oklahoma CC | Conyers, GA |
| G | 3 | John Knight III | 6 ft 2 in (1.88 m) | 195 lb (88 kg) | So | Callaway HS; SW Mississippi CC | Jackson, MS |
| G | 4 | Crew Ainge (W) | 5 ft 11 in (1.8 m) | 180 lb (82 kg) | RS So | Kimball Union Academy | Wellesley, MA |
| G | 5 | Sam Merrill | 6 ft 5 in (1.96 m) | 210 lb (95 kg) | Jr | Bountiful HS | Bountiful, UT |
| F | 10 | Quinn Taylor | 6 ft 8 in (2.03 m) | 240 lb (109 kg) | RS Sr | Langham Creek | Houston, TX |
| F | 12 | Justin Bean | 6 ft 7 in (2.01 m) | 205 lb (93 kg) | RS Fr | Southmoore HS | Moore, OK |
| F | 13 | Ke'Sean Davis | 6 ft 7 in (2.01 m) | 225 lb (102 kg) | Jr | Taft Charter HS; Seward County CC | Compton, CA |
| F | 14 | Roche Grootfaam | 6 ft 8 in (2.03 m) | 220 lb (100 kg) | Jr | Covenant Christian Academy; College of Southern Idaho | Paramaribo, Suriname |
| G | 15 | Abel Porter | 6 ft 3 in (1.91 m) | 195 lb (88 kg) | RS So | Davis HS | Farmington, UT |
| F | 21 | Ben Fakira | 6 ft 10 in (2.08 m) | 240 lb (109 kg) | Fr | Barker College | Sydney, Australia |
| G | 22 | Brock Miller | 6 ft 6 in (1.98 m) | 200 lb (91 kg) | RS Fr | Brighton HS | Sandy, UT |
| G | 24 | Diogo Brito | 6 ft 5 in (1.96 m) | 205 lb (93 kg) | RS Jr | Mountain Mission School | Póvoa de Varzim, Portugal |
| C | 23 | Neemias Queta | 6 ft 11 in (2.11 m) | 225 lb (102 kg) | Fr | Benfica (basketball) | Barreiro, Portugal |

Head coach

- Craig Smith (North Dakota)

Assistant coach(es)

- Austin Hansen (South Dakota State)
- Eric Peterson (UW–La Crosse)
- David Ragland (Southern Indiana)

Legend

- (C) Team captain
- (S) Suspended
- (I) Ineligible
- (W) Walk-on
- Injured
- Current redshirt

Roster

== Schedule and results ==
| Date time, TV | Rank^{#} | Opponent^{#} | Result | Record | Site (attendance) city, state |
Exhibition
| Nov 1, 2018*; 7:00 pm | | Evergreen State | W 96–45 | | Smith Spectrum (5,744); Logan, UT |
Non-conference regular season
| Nov 6, 2018*; 7:00 pm | | at Montana State | W 101–71 | 1–0 | Brick Breeden Fieldhouse (2,354); Bozeman, MT |
| Nov 9, 2018*; 7:00 pm | | Hartford; MGM Resorts Main Event campus-site game | W 100–73 | 2–0 | Smith Spectrum (8,500); Logan, UT |
| Nov 13, 2018*; 7:00 pm | | Mississippi Valley State | W 94–59 | 3–0 | Smith Spectrum (5,133); Logan, UT |
| Nov 16, 2018*; 7:00 pm, Stadium | | Utah Valley; MGM Resorts Main Event campus-site game | W 65–46 | 4–0 | Smith Spectrum (6,474); Logan, UT |
| Nov 19, 2018*; 9:00 pm, ESPNU | | vs. Saint Mary's; MGM Resorts Main Event Heavyweight semifinals | W 80–63 | 5–0 | T-Mobile Arena; Paradise, NV |
| Nov 21, 2018*; 9:00 pm, ESPNU | | vs. Arizona State; MGM Resorts Main Event Heavyweight championship | L 82–87 | 5–1 | T-Mobile Arena (3,157); Paradise, NV |
| Nov 28, 2018*; 7:00 pm, Stadium | | Northern Iowa; MW–MVC Challenge | W 71–52 | 6–1 | Smith Spectrum (5,134); Logan, UT |
| Dec 1, 2018*; 8:00 pm | | at UC Irvine | W 89–65 | 7–1 | Bren Events Center (1,812); Irvine, CA |
| Dec 5, 2018*; 7:00 pm, BYUtv | | at BYU; Old Oquirrh Bucket | L 80–95 | 7–2 | Marriott Center (11,377); Provo, UT |
| Dec 8, 2018*; 2:30 pm, ATTSNRM | | vs. Weber State; Old Oquirrh Bucket/Beehive Classic | W 76–67 | 8–2 | Vivint Smart Home Arena (10,678); Salt Lack City, UT |
| Dec 15, 2018*; 7:00 pm | | Alabama State | W 86–48 | 9–2 | Smith Spectrum (6,078); Logan, UT |
| Dec 20, 2018*; 6:00 pm, ESPN3 | | at No. 21 Houston | L 50–60 | 9–3 | Fertitta Center (6,264); Houston, TX |
| Dec 28, 2018*; 7:00 pm | | Eastern Oregon | W 84–57 | 10–3 | Smith Spectrum (7,056); Logan, UT |
Mountain West regular season
| Jan 2, 2019; 9:00 pm, ESPNU | | at No. 6 Nevada | L 49–72 | 10–4 (0–1) | Lawlor Events Center (11,224); Reno, NV |
| Jan 5, 2019; 7:00 pm | | Air Force | W 79–62 | 11–4 (1–1) | Smith Spectrum (8,412); Logan, UT |
| Jan 9, 2019; 7:00 pm | | Fresno State | L 77–78 | 11–5 (1–2) | Smith Spectrum (6,379); Logan, UT |
| Jan 12, 2019; 4:00 pm, ATTSNRM | | at Wyoming | W 71–55 | 12–5 (2–2) | Arena-Auditorium (3,426); Laramie, WY |
| Jan 16, 2019; 8:00 pm | | at San Jose State | W 81–63 | 13–5 (3–2) | Event Center Arena (1,388); San Jose, CA |
| Jan 19, 2019; 7:00 pm | | Colorado State | W 87–72 | 14–5 (4–2) | Smith Spectrum (7,509); Logan, UT |
| Jan 26, 2019; 2:00 pm, CBSSN | | at New Mexico | W 68–66 | 15–5 (5–2) | Dreamstyle Arena (10,752); Albuquerque, NM |
| Jan 30, 2019; 7:00 pm | | San Jose State | W 103–73 | 16–5 (6–2) | Smith Spectrum (6,599); Logan, UT |
| Feb 2, 2019; 2:30 pm, ATTSNRM | | UNLV | W 82–65 | 17–5 (7–2) | Smith Spectrum (7,157); Logan, UT |
| Feb 6, 2019; 8:30 pm, ATTSNRM | | at Fresno State | W 82–81 | 18–5 (8–2) | Save Mart Center (5,091); Fresno, CA |
| Feb 9, 2019; 8:00 pm, ESPN3 | | at San Diego State | L 63–68 | 18–6 (8–3) | Viejas Arena (10,631); San Diego, CA |
| Feb 13, 2019; 7:00 pm | | Wyoming | W 76–59 | 19–6 (9–3) | Smith Spectrum (5,458); Logan, UT |
| Feb 16, 2019; 2:00 pm | | at Air Force | W 76–62 | 20–6 (10–3) | Clune Arena (3,037); Colorado Springs, CO |
| Feb 20, 2019; 9:00 pm, ESPNU | | New Mexico | W 71–55 | 21–6 (11–3) | Smith Spectrum (6,273); Logan, UT |
| Feb 23, 2019; 2:00 pm, Stadium | | at Boise State | W 78–71 ^{OT} | 22–6 (12–3) | Taco Bell Arena (6,581); Boise, ID |
| Feb 26, 2019; 7:30 pm, CBSSN | | San Diego State | W 70–54 | 23–6 (13–3) | Smith Spectrum (8,160); Logan, UT |
| Mar 2, 2019; 6:30 pm, CBSSN | | No. 12 Nevada | W 81–76 | 24–6 (14–3) | Smith Spectrum (10,387); Logan, UT |
| Mar 5, 2019; 7:00 pm, ATTSNRM | | at Colorado State | W 100–96 ^{OT} | 25–6 (15–3) | Moby Arena (2,548); Fort Collins, CO |
Mountain West tournament
| Mar 14, 2019; 7:00 pm, CBSSN | (2) | vs. (7) New Mexico; Quarterfinals | W 91–83 | 26–6 | Thomas & Mack Center (7,518); Paradise, NV |
| Mar 15, 2019; 9:30 pm, CBSSN | (2) | vs. (3) Fresno State; Semifinals | W 85–60 | 27–6 | Thomas & Mack Center (8,764); Paradise, NV |
| Mar 16, 2019; 4:00 pm, CBS | (2) | vs. (4) San Diego State; Championship | W 64–57 | 28–6 | Thomas & Mack Center (8,969); Paradise, NV |
NCAA tournament
| Mar 22, 2019*; 4:50 pm, TNT | (8 MW) No. 25 | vs. (9 MW) Washington; First Round | L 61–78 | 28–7 | Nationwide Arena (19,426); Columbus, OH |
*Non-conference game. ^{#}Rankings from AP Poll. (#) Tournament seedings in parentheses. MW=Midwest Source. All times are in Mountain.
