= Brian Jackson (basketball) =

American former professional basketball player

Personal information
- Born: February 1, 1959 (age 67) Torrance, California, U.S.
- Listed height: 6 ft 8 in (2.03 m)
- Listed weight: 209 lb (95 kg)

Career information
- High school: Palos Verdes (Palos Verdes Estates, California)
- College: Utah State (1977–1981)
- NBA draft: 1981: 2nd round, 26th overall pick
- Drafted by: Portland Trail Blazers
- Playing career: 1981–1995
- Position: Forward

Career history
- 1981–1982: Círcol Catòlic
- 1982–1983: Reyer Venezia
- 1983–1985: Real Madrid
- 1985–1986: UG Goriziana
- 1986–1992: Peñas Huesca
- 1992–1995: CB Sevilla

Career highlights
- ACB Three-Point Shootout champion (1989); 4× ACB All-Star (1988–1991); Copa del Rey winner (1985); 2× Liga ACB champion (1984–1985); FIBA European Cup Winners' Cup winner (1984); FIBA Saporta Cup Finals top scorer (1984); First-team All-PCAA (1981); 2× Second-team All-PCAA (1979, 1980)
- Stats at Basketball Reference

Brian Ralph Jackson (born February 1, 1959) is an American former professional basketball player. After playing high school basketball in Palos Verdes Estates, California, Jackson played college basketball at Utah State, and was an all-conference selection in three of his four seasons there. He was selected in the second round (26th overall) of the 1981 NBA draft by the Portland Trail Blazers but was waived before the start of the NBA season, and he moved to Europe where he played in Italy and most notably in Spain, where he was selected as an All-Star 4 times. While playing for Real Madrid he won 2 league titles, one Copa del Rey and one FIBA European Cup Winners' Cup, of which he also was the finals top scorer. He retired in 1995 after a 14-year career; in 2012 he was inducted in the Utah State Athletics Hall of Fame.

== High school career ==
Jackson was born in Torrance, California and played basketball at Palos Verdes in Palos Verdes Estates, California under coach John Mihaljevich. He played the center position in high school, and in his senior year he was named a preseason all-American; in his last season at Palos Verdes he averaged 21 points and 15 rebounds per game.

== College career ==
Jackson signed to play for Utah State in April 1977, and chose to wear jersey number 55. In his freshman year Jackson played 28 games, starting 11, and averaged 8.3 points, 5.5 rebounds and 0.8 assists in 22.7 minutes per game. On January 7, 1978, Jackson scored a career-high 24 points against BYU in a 84–85 loss. Jackson's sophomore year saw him being promoted to the starting lineup, and his 37.1 minutes per game were the best mark in the program history surpassing Ed Gregg's 37.0 in 1975–76. He averaged 15.7 points and 8.3 rebounds (second on his team in scoring and first in rebounding), and he was a 2nd team all-PCAA selection. On December 2, 1978, he recorded a new career-high 28 points against Western Michigan. Utah State qualified for the 1979 NCAA Division I Basketball Tournament, facing USC in the first round: in a 86–67 loss Jackson recorded 17 points and 13 rebounds in 35 minutes of play.

In his junior year Jackson improved his scoring average to 20 points per game, and again he was the top rebounder of his team with 7 per game. At the end of the regular season he was a 2nd team all-PCAA selection for the second year in a row, and again he appeared in the NCAA Tournament. In the 1980 Tournament Utah State (11th seed in the West) faced Clemson, losing 76–73:Jackson scored 11 points and recorded 6 rebounds. Jackson's senior year saw his career-highs in scoring (23.4 points per game) and rebounding (8.9 per game), being the team leader in both categories. His 37.4 minutes per game were a new best mark in Utah State history at the time, surpassing his own record of 37.1 established in his sophomore year. He was also a 1st team all-PCAA selection, and made the PCAA All-Tournament team.

He recorded 1,903 points and 840 rebounds in his career at Utah State, 27 double-doubles, 96 starts in 113 games, and 3,768 total minutes. In 2012 Jackson was inducted in the Utah State Athletics Hall of Fame.

=== College statistics ===
Year	Team	GP	GS	MPG	FG%	3P%	FT%	RPG	APG	SPG	BPG	PPG
1977–78	Utah State	28	11	22.7	.546	–	.729	5.5	0.8	–	–	8.3
1978–79	Utah State	30	30	37.1	.551	–	.723	8.3	1.8	–	–	15.7
1979–80	Utah State	27	27	36.1	.516	–	.818	7.0	1.4	0.8	–	20.0
1980–81	Utah State	28	28	37.4	.508	–	.829	8.9	–	–	–	23.4
Career		113	96	33.3	.530	–	.775	7.4	–	–	–	16.9

== Professional career ==
After the end of his senior season, Jackson was automatically eligible for the 1981 NBA draft, during which he was selected by the Portland Trail Blazers with the 3rd pick in the second round (26th overall). He participated in the Los Angeles Summer Pro Basketball League in 1981 with the Trail Blazers, but he was waived before the start of the 1981–82 NBA season. He then moved to Spain and signed for Primera División team Círcol Catòlic: in the 1981–82 season Jackson was second in the league in scoring with 29.5 points per game, behind Larry McNeill. In 1982 he moved to Italy, where he joined Reyer Venezia for the 1982–83 Lega Basket Serie A season.

In 1983 he moved back to Spain, and signed for Real Madrid. In his first season he averaged 23.9 points and 2.8 rebounds per game while shooting 59% from the field and 78% from the free throw line in 38.4 minutes per game. He then played 7 postseason games, averaging 25.3 points and 3 rebounds per game: he won the league title that year. In the same season Jackson participated in the FIBA European Cup Winners' Cup, and he also won that competition, being also the finals co-top scorer with Roberto Premier. In his second season with Real Madrid he won another league title, and also won the 1985 Copa del Rey. In the 1984–85 season he averaged 21.5 points and 4.6 rebounds in 34.7 minutes per game during regular season play, and 22.2 points in postseason play.

In 1985 he left Real Madrid and signed for Unione Ginnastica Goriziana, an Italian club which played in the Serie A2, the second level of Italian basketball. After spending the 1985–86 season there he went back to Spain in 1986, this time joining CB Peñas Huesca. He played 19 games in his first season with the club, averaging 22.5 points, 5.4 rebounds and 2.2 steals per game while shooting 57.9% from the field. In the following season he started to focus more on three-point shooting, going from 0.1 attempts the previous year to 1.3 attempts per game, and shot 40% from the three-point line. He averaged 24.6 points and 4.7 rebounds in 37.8 minutes per game. In the 1988–89 season he was selected as an All-Star for the first time in his career, and won the ACB Three-Point Shootout: he also played a career-high 40.1 minutes per game, shooting 48.5% from three on 2.9 attempts per game. In the 1989–90 season he shot a career-high 55.8% from the three-point line (92-of-165) over 36 league games, averaging 22.9 points and 4 rebounds. During his time at Peñas Huesca he was selected 4 times in the ACB All-Star team.

In 1992 he moved to CB Sevilla (named Caja San Fernando for sponsorship reasons) and in 1993 he was the first player in ACB history to record 6,000 points. At the end of his career in Spain in 1995 he had played 392 league games, scoring a total of 8,651 points, which ranked him first in league history until he was surpassed by Jordi Villacampa. As of 2019 he ranked third in ACB history for points scored behind Alberto Herreros and Jordi Villacampa.
