= Greg Grant (basketball, born 1960) =

American basketball player

Personal information
- Born: March 25, 1960 (age 65); Salt Lake City, Utah, U.S.
- Listed height: 6 ft 7 in (2.01 m)
- Listed weight: 205 lb (93 kg)

Career information
- High school: East (Salt Lake City, Utah)
- College: Utah State (1982–1986)
- NBA draft: 1986: 6th round, 132nd overall pick
- Drafted by: Detroit Pistons
- Playing career: 1986–1987
- Position: Small forward

Career highlights
- PCAA co-Player of the Year (1986); 2× First-team All-PCAA (1985, 1986); 2× Second-team All-PCAA (1983, 1984); PCAA Freshman of the Year (1983); 3× AP Honorable mention All-American (1983, 1985, 1986); No. 5 retired by Utah State Aggies
- Stats at Basketball Reference

Greg Grant (born March 25, 1960) is an American former college basketball player known for his prolific career at Utah State University in the 1980s. Grant complied 2,000 points and 1,000 rebounds for his career and was the 1986 Pacific Coast Athletic Association co-Player of the Year.

== Early life and education ==
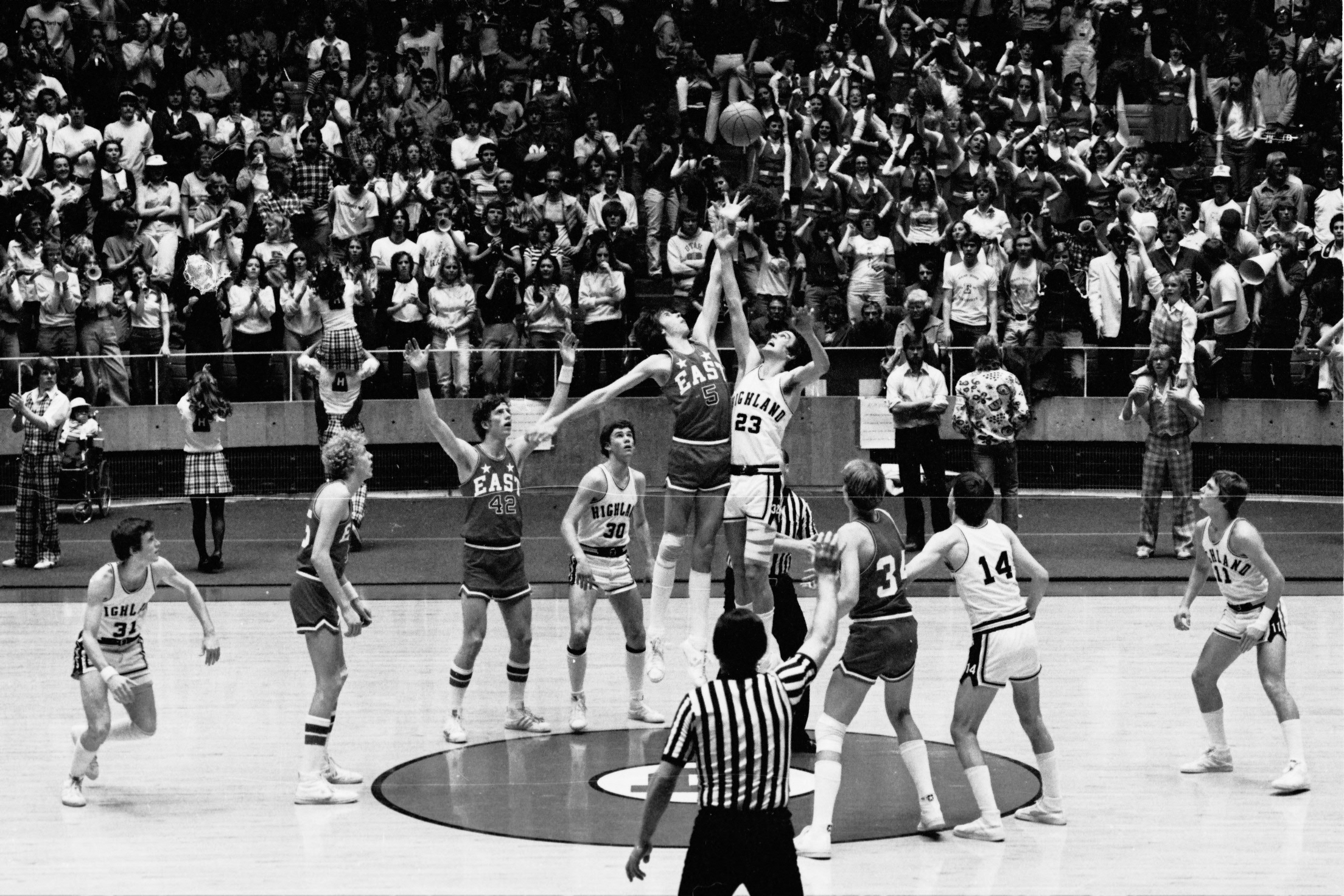
Grant (#5) in the finals of the Utah 4A State Basketball Tournament in 1979

Grant was born and raised in Salt Lake City, Utah, the son of Bonnie and judge Paul Grant, who played basketball at University of Utah. Grant has two younger brothers who also played basketball. Nate was a teammate at Utah State, while Josh followed in his father's footsteps to the Utah and later played professionally, including a season for the Golden State Warriors.

Grant played for East High School, and was chosen as a Utah High School All-Star as a senior in 1979.

He then spent two years as a Mormon missionary in Australia before enrolling at Utah State in 1981. A knee injury then caused him to miss the 1981–82 season.

Grant entered the Aggies starting lineup as a freshman, averaging 15.9 points and 9.1 rebounds per game on his way to earning PCAA Freshman of the Year honors and a spot on the all-conference second team. The Aggies earned a spot in the 1983 NCAA tournament. Grant continued his consistent scoring and rebounding, earning all-conference honors all four years. As a senior, Grant averaged a career-high 22.6 points per game and became the leading scorer in school history, as well as in the history of the PCAA (both marks since eclipsed). At the close of the season, Grant was named the co-Player of the Year in the PCAA (now the Big West Conference), sharing the award with UNLV forward Anthony Jones. Grant finished his college career with 2,127 points and 1,003 rebounds.

=== National Basketball Association ===
Following his college career, Grant was drafted by the Detroit Pistons in the sixth round of the 1986 NBA draft (132nd pick overall) but did not make the final roster. He played one season in Spain before returning to the United States and leaving the game.

== See also ==
- List of NCAA Division I men's basketball players with 2000 points and 1000 rebounds
