= Reed Bullen =

American politician (1906–2005)

Reed Bullen (November 17, 1906 – October 12, 2005) was a Utah broadcaster, politician and a local leader in the Church of Jesus Christ of Latter-day Saints (LDS Church).

Bullen was born and died in Logan, Utah. His father was Herschel Bullen. In 1929 Reed Bullen graduated from what would later be Utah State University with a degree in business. He brought KVNU to Logan in 1938 and later the cable network North Utah Community TV. In 1985 he was inducted into the Utah Broadcasters Hall of Fame.

In the LDS Church Bullen served as a bishop, stake president, patriarch and from 1978 to 1984 as president of the Logan Utah Temple.

From 1955 to 1976 Bullen was a member of the Utah State Senate, serving as a Republican. During this time he served as majority leader and later as senate president.

Bullen and his wife Kathryn Bowen were the parents of five children.

== Sources ==
- Deseret News, Oct. 12, 2005, obituary
