= Utah State Aggies men's basketball =

Men's college basketball team

Utah State Aggies
2026–27 Utah State Aggies men's basketball team
- University: Utah State University
- First season: 1903–04
- Head coach: Ben Jacobson (1st season)
- Location: Logan, Utah
- Arena: Dee Glen Smith Spectrum (capacity: 10,270)
- Conference: Pac-12
- Nickname: Aggies
- Colors: Navy blue, white, and pewter gray
- Student section: The Hurd
- All-time record: 1,769–1,171 (.602)

NCAA Division I tournament Elite Eight
- 1939, 1970

NCAA Division I tournament Sweet Sixteen
- 1962, 1964, 1970

NCAA Division I tournament appearances
- 1939, 1962, 1963, 1964, 1970, 1971, 1975, 1979, 1980, 1983, 1988, 1998, 2000, 2001, 2003, 2005, 2006, 2009, 2010, 2011, 2019, 2021, 2023, 2024, 2025, 2026

Conference tournament champions
- 1988, 1998, 2000, 2001, 2003, 2005, 2009, 2011, 2019, 2020, 2026

Conference regular-season champions
- 1926, 1930, 1935, 1936, 1980, 1995, 1997, 1998, 2000, 2002, 2004, 2008, 2009, 2010, 2011, 2019, 2024, 2026

Uniforms
Home	Away	Alternate

The Utah State Aggies men's basketball team represents Utah State University in NCAA Division I men’s basketball. Founded in the 1903–04 season, the Aggies play their home games at the 10,270-seat Dee Glen Smith Spectrum in Logan, Utah, and joined the Pac-12 Conference on July 1, 2026, after leaving the Mountain West Conference. During Stew Morrill’s 17-year tenure, the Aggies compiled a 193–13 (.937) home record, establishing one of the nation’s toughest home-court advantages. As of the end of the 2025–26 season, the Aggies hold an all-time record of 1,769 wins and 1,171 losses (.602), following a 29–7 campaign that included a 15–5 conference mark and an average home attendance of 9,682 at the Dee Glen Smith Spectrum.

== History ==
=== Early years (1902–1941) ===
The first basketball team on Utah State's campus was organized in 1902 and consisted of only women. A men's team was organized in 1904, at which point the women's club fell into obscurity.

=== Rise to prominence and the Wayne Estes era (1942–1971) ===
The Aggies enjoyed mixed success early in their history, making sporadic NCAA tournament appearances and alternating between winning in the then-smaller postseason bracket and winning little at all. Perhaps the most notable event in Utah State basketball history occurred on February 8, 1965, with the tragic death of Wayne Estes. Estes was a 6'6" forward for the Aggies and was the nation's second leading scorer in 1965, behind only Rick Barry, at 33.7 ppg. He had just amassed 2,000 career points with a 48-point showing in a home victory over the University of Denver, when he stopped at the scene of a car accident in Logan. While crossing the street, Estes accidentally clipped a downed power line with his head and was electrocuted. The Los Angeles Lakers had planned to draft him in the 1st round of the NBA draft, and he likely would have gone on to win several championships with the team. Following Estes's death, he was posthumously named a 1st-team All-American.

=== Independence and national recognition (1972–1978) ===
The men's basketball team wasn't adversely affected by the constant shuffling of conference affiliations and independent status that blighted the USU football program throughout the mid-to-late 20th century. The program, however, endured a lengthy stint as an independent program from 1937 to 1978—although, in that period, basketball independence was not the financial and competitive obstacle it would become in the ESPN era. Meanwhile, it remained USU's most resilient and popular sport, enjoying steady success for decades. During the 1960s and '70s, the Aggies spent a great deal of time in both major national polls, finishing the season in the AP Top 25 three times and in the Coaches' Poll Top 25 seven times. USU reached the NCAA Sweet 16 in 1962 and the Elite Eight in 1970. In 2024, the Aggies ranked 19th on the Coaches' Poll.

=== The Dee Glen Smith Spectrum and WAC success (1979–1998) ===
The Aggies enjoy a particularly strong home-court advantage at the Dee Glen Smith Spectrum, where they were 193–13 in the Morrill era. During the 1980s and 1990s, Utah State remained competitive through multiple conference realignments and earned an NCAA berth in 1988 under Kohn Smith and another in 1998 under Larry Eustachy. The program’s success and fan support laid the groundwork for a resurgence entering the 21st century.

=== The Stew Morrill era (1998–2015) ===
Utah State made eight NCAA tournament appearances (2000, 2001, 2003, 2005, 2006, 2009, 2010, 2011), won six league championships, and went 13 straight years with 23 wins under head coach Stew Morrill. Under his leadership, the team appeared in national polls and went 193–13 at home in the Dee Glen Smith Spectrum. In the 2008-09 season, USU topped the country in field goal percentage (49.8%), ranked second in winning percentage, and finished fifth in assist-to-turnover ratio. USU team was first in 3-point field goal percentage (42.5%) nationally in the season of 2009-10.

Utah State won the Old Oquirrh Bucket, awarded to the Utah college team with the best record against in-state opponents, nine times, including the final two awards in 2009 and 2010. The schools retired the trophy in 2010 after conference realignment disrupted in-state scheduling.

=== Modern Mountain West era (2015–present) ===
Coaching eras in brief: Early coaches such as E. Lowell Romney (1920–1941) and LaDell Andersen (1962–1971) guided the Aggies to multiple NCAA appearances and established a foundation for success. The modern era of sustained winning began under Stew Morrill (1998–2015), who set the program record with 402 victories and led USU to eight NCAA tournaments and multiple league titles. After Morrill, Tim Duryea (2015–2018), Craig Smith (2019–2021), and Ryan Odom (2021–2023) stewarded the program through the Mountain West era. Danny Sprinkle led USU to a 28–7 record, the program's first outright Mountain West regular-season title, and the second round of the 2024 NCAA tournament before leaving for Washington. Jerrod Calhoun was hired in 2024 and went 26–8 in his first season. In 2025–26, the Aggies' final season in the Mountain West, they won the league's regular-season and tournament championships, beat Villanova 86–76 in the first round of the NCAA tournament, and lost to top-seeded Arizona 78–66 in the second round to finish 29–7. Calhoun left in March 2026 to coach Cincinnati, and Utah State hired longtime Northern Iowa coach Ben Jacobson on March 30, 2026, ahead of the program's move to the Pac-12.

== Program records and milestones ==
Utah State is among the winningest programs in the western United States, ranking in the top tier nationally in all-time victories, 20-win seasons, home winning percentage, and postseason appearances. The Aggies have recorded more than 1,700 all-time wins, 26 NCAA Tournament appearances across eight decades, and sustained periods of national relevance across multiple coaching eras.

=== All-time records ===
- All-time record: 1,740–1,164 (.599) through 2024–25
- Home record (all venues): 900+ wins; .812 at the Dee Glen Smith Spectrum since 1970
- Road/neutral record: Detailed breakdown available in the media guide
- Seasons with 20+ wins: 31
- Seasons with 25+ wins: 14
- Consecutive winning seasons: 17 (1998–2015, Stew Morrill era)

=== Home winning streaks ===
Utah State has long been recognized for dominant play in Logan, particularly at the Dee Glen Smith Spectrum. Major streaks include:

- Longest home winning streak: 37 games (2007–09), the second-longest in the nation at the time
- Morrill-era home record: 193–13 (.937) from 1999–2015
- Most home wins in a single season: 15 (multiple seasons)

=== National rankings milestones ===
Utah State has appeared in the AP Poll, Coaches Poll, or both in multiple eras, with rankings spanning six decades.

- Highest AP ranking: No. 16 (various seasons)
- Weeks ranked in AP Top 25: 50+
- Final AP Top 25 finishes: 1962, 1970, 2011, 2019
- Most recent ranking: No. 19 in the 2023–24 Coaches Poll

=== Postseason streaks and benchmarks ===
- NCAA Tournament appearances: 26 (1939–2025)
- NCAA Tournament decades represented: 1930s, 1960s, 1970s, 1980s, 1990s, 2000s, 2010s, 2020s
- Best NCAA finishes: Elite Eight (1939, 1970); Sweet Sixteen (1962, 1964, 1970)
- Most NCAA bids in a decade: 8 (2000–09, Morrill era)
- NIT appearances: 10
- CIT runner-up: 2012 (4–1 record)

=== Individual program records ===
Utah State’s record book features some of the most decorated players in Western basketball history, including several All-Americans and future NBA players.

- Career scoring leader: Wayne Estes — 2,001 points (1963–65)
- Single-season scoring leader: Multiple seasons by Estes and Jaycee Carroll
- Career rebounding leader: Greg Grant — 1,000+ rebounds
- Career assists leader: Late-2000s guards hold the top marks
- Career 3-point leader: Jaycee Carroll — program record holder for 3-pointers made
- Highest single-season field goal percentage: Morrill-era forwards dominate top entries
- Most double-doubles in a career: Wayne Estes and Tai Wesley among leaders

=== Notable program milestones ===
- First 20-win season: 1946–47
- First postseason appearance: 1939 NCAA Tournament
- First national ranking: 1960s
- Most wins in a season: 30 (2008–09; 2010–11)
- Most consecutive home wins over conference opponents: 20+ during multiple spans
- Most consecutive NCAA appearances: 4 (2009–11; 2023–25)

== Head coaches ==
The Utah State men’s basketball program has been led by a series of influential coaches since its inception in 1903. Early coaches such as E. Lowell Romney (1920–1941) and LaDell Andersen (1962–1971) laid the foundation for the program and guided the Aggies to multiple NCAA Tournament appearances.

The modern era of sustained success began under Stew Morrill, who coached from 1998 to 2015. Morrill led Utah State to eight NCAA Tournament appearances, seven regular-season conference championships, and six conference tournament titles, and his 402 wins are the most in program history.

Following Morrill, Tim Duryea coached the Aggies for three seasons (2015–2018). Craig Smith (2018–2021) went 74–23 and qualified for the NCAA tournament in each of his three seasons, winning a share of the 2019 Mountain West regular-season title and Mountain West tournament titles in 2019 and 2020; the 2020 NCAA tournament was canceled because of the COVID-19 pandemic. Ryan Odom (2021–2023) went 44–25 and led the Aggies to an at-large NCAA tournament berth in 2023 before leaving for VCU.

In April 2023, Utah State hired Danny Sprinkle as head coach. Sprinkle spent one season at USU (2023–24), during which the Aggies recorded a 28–7 record, won the Mountain West regular season title, and advanced to the second round of the NCAA Tournament. Shortly after the season, Sprinkle departed to become head coach at the University of Washington.

On March 30, 2024, the Aggies hired Jerrod Calhoun from Youngstown State. Calhoun went 26–8 in his first season and 29–7 in his second, when Utah State won the Mountain West regular-season and tournament titles and reached the second round of the NCAA Tournament. He left in March 2026 to become head coach at Cincinnati.

On March 30, 2026, Utah State hired Ben Jacobson, who had spent 20 seasons as head coach at Northern Iowa, as the program's 23rd head coach. He leads the Aggies in their first Pac-12 season.

=== Head coaching history ===
The following is a list of Utah State Aggies men's basketball head coaches and their records through the end of the 2024–25 season.

Head coaching history
Coach	Tenure	Seasons	Record	Conf. titles	NCAA	NIT
Stew Morrill	1998–2015	17	402–156 (.720)	7	8	4
E. Lowell Romney	1919–1941	22	225–157 (.589)	4	1	–
LaDell Andersen	1961–1971	10	173–96 (.643)	–	5	1
H. Cecil Baker	1950–1961	11	158–141 (.528)	–	–	1
Rod Tueller	1979–1988	9	139–120 (.537)	1	3	1
Dutch Belnap	1973–1979	6	106–58 (.646)	–	2	1
Larry Eustachy	1993–1998	5	98–53 (.649)	3	1	1
Craig Smith	2018–2021	3	74–24 (.755)	1	3	–
Kohn Smith	1988–1993	5	63–78 (.447)	–	–	–
Tim Duryea	2015–2018	3	47–49 (.490)	–	–	–
Ryan Odom	2021–2023	2	44–25 (.638)	–	1	1
Joe Whitesides	1947–1950	3	35–54 (.393)	–	–	–
Joseph K. Jensen	1914–1919	5	30–17 (.638)	1	–	–
Danny Sprinkle	2023–2024	1	28–7 (.800)	1	1	–
T. L. Plain	1971–1973	2	28–24 (.538)	–	–	–
Jerrod Calhoun	2024–2026	2	55–15 (.786)	1	2	–
D. D. Young	1942–1943, 1944–1945	2	23–17 (.575)	–	–	–
Clayton T. Teetzel	1908–1914	6	23–33 (.411)	–	–	–
H. B. Lee	1945–1947	2	21–22 (.488)	–	–	–
Robert W. Burnett	1941–1942	1	6–10 (.375)	–	–	–
George Peter Campbell	1903–1904, 1905–1907	3	6–15 (.286)	–	–	–
Mysterious Walker	1907–1908	1	0–8 (.000)	–	–	–
Totals	—	—	1,714–1,156 (.597)	—	—	—

NCAA = NCAA Tournament appearances; NIT = National Invitation Tournament appearances.

== Arenas and traditions ==
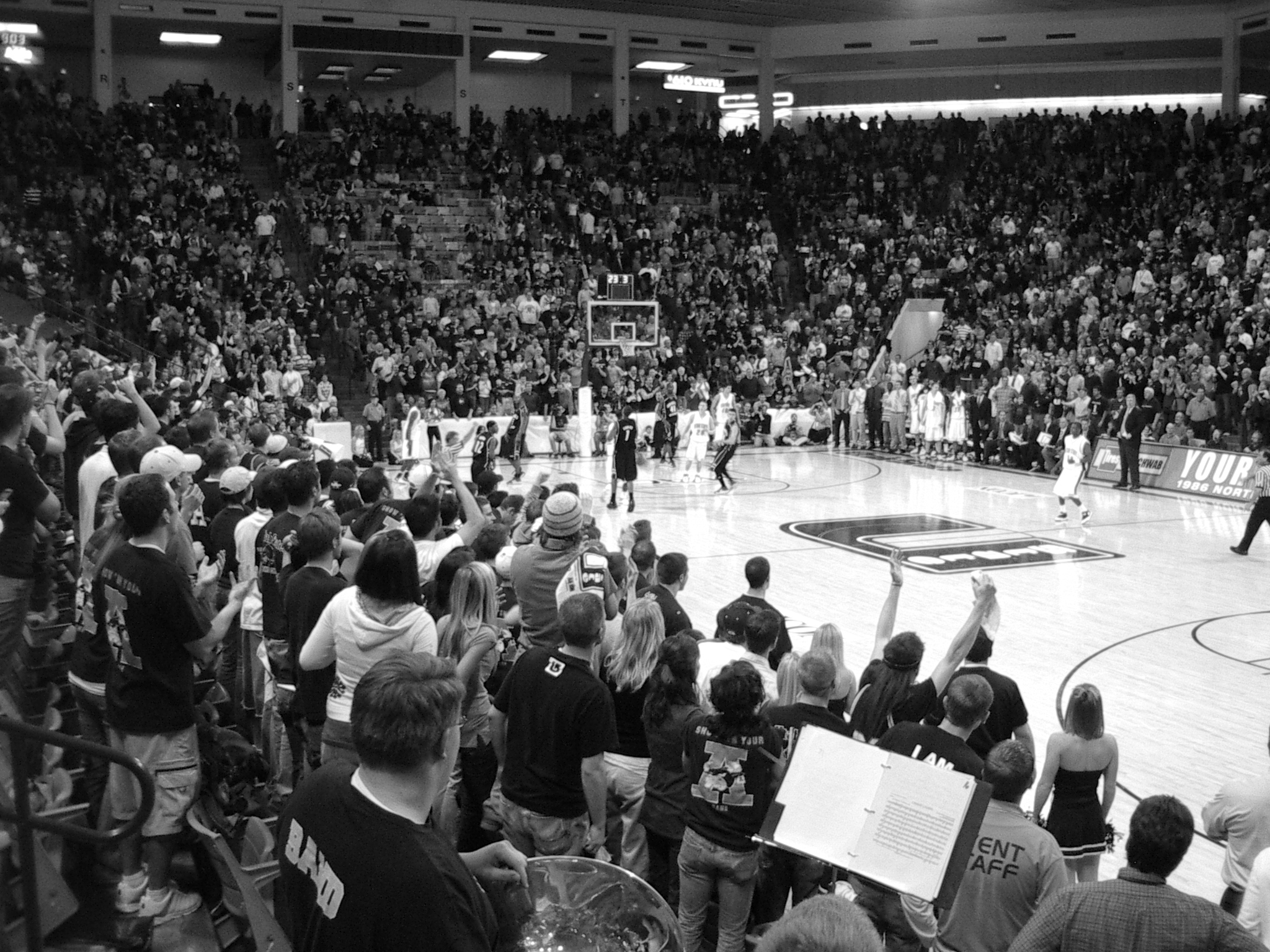
Aggies cheering on their basketball team at the Dee Glen Smith Spectrum.

Utah State plays its home games at the Dee Glen Smith Spectrum, a 10,270-seat arena on the Utah State campus. The Aggies have compiled a 453–105 (.812) record at the Spectrum, which has served as the program's home since 1970. Before its construction, Utah State's basketball teams played at the George Nelson Fieldhouse on campus. Under head coach Craig Smith, the Aggies were 39–4 (.910) at home. Until a surprising early-season loss in 2009, Utah State held the nation’s second-longest home win streak (37 games), behind only Kansas.

The Dee Glen Smith Spectrum features a seating configuration that extends to court level. A significant portion of the court-side seating is designated for the student body, which comprises a student section known as "The Hurd." The arena's design and students' proximity to the court have led various media outlets to describe the venue as a difficult environment for visiting teams.

In the 1990s, when his Utah teams were competing for Final Four appearances, head coach Rick Majerus called the Spectrum the toughest arena in the country for his teams to play in. After a 2010 game in Logan, Wichita State head coach Gregg Marshall remarked, “Utah State has 4,000 student tickets, and they make an impression. It’s just a party—one heck of a party. It’s the best I’ve ever seen... I’ve been to Duke, Kentucky, UConn, and Syracuse, and it’s clearly the best atmosphere I’ve ever seen.”

Among Utah State traditions are the “I believe that we will win!” chant and the “Winning team, losing team” chant, which humorously mocks opponents in the closing moments of home victories. An unofficial student publication, The Refraction, was distributed before each home game from 2007 to 2011, offering tongue-in-cheek analysis and crowd-engagement content.

One of Utah State’s most recognizable fans, “Wild Bill” Sproat, gained national attention for his humorous antics meant to distract opposing free-throw shooters.

== Rivalries ==
Utah State maintains several notable regional and conference rivalries that span decades and have shaped the Aggies’ basketball identity. The most prominent rivalries include Nevada, Utah, BYU, UNLV, and Boise State — each marked by historic games, passionate fanbases, and conference implications.

=== Nevada ===
Utah State’s series with the Nevada Wolf Pack is one of the Aggies' most competitive rivalries, dating back to Big West and WAC play and continuing in the Mountain West. Since 1951–52, Utah State leads the series 40–26, including a 24–7 mark in Logan.

One of the rivalry’s signature moments came on March 2, 2019, when Utah State upset No. 12 Nevada 81–76 at the Dee Glen Smith Spectrum, clinching a share of the Mountain West regular-season title amid a raucous crowd. The series has remained high-stakes in recent years. In 2024–25, the Aggies swept the Wolf Pack, winning 69–64 in Reno on December 31, 2024, and 90–69 in Logan on January 22, 2025.

=== Utah ===
Utah State and the University of Utah share one of the oldest in-state rivalries in college basketball. The two programs have met more than 200 times since the early 1900s, with matchups taking place regularly until the 2010s.

During the modern era, the series has featured numerous close games and alternating stretches of dominance. Utah State earned notable wins in 2004 (71–45 in Logan), 2008 (66–64 in Logan), and 2010 (79–62 in Logan), while Utah has won the most recent meetings, including a 77–67 victory in the 2017 Beehive Classic at Vivint Arena in Salt Lake City.

Despite the schools’ proximity and shared history, the rivalry has been played intermittently in recent years due to scheduling priorities and conference realignment. Coaches and fans on both sides have expressed interest in resuming the annual matchup, which remains one of the most recognized rivalries in Utah sports.

=== BYU ===
Utah State’s long-standing rivalry with BYU dates back to the early 20th century and has produced more than 200 meetings. The schools, separated by just 120 miles, frequently battled as conference foes in the past and continue to meet periodically in non-conference play.

BYU dominated much of the series in the 1990s and 2000s, but Utah State secured key home victories in 2009 (71–61) and 2011 (69–62) at the Smith Spectrum. The most recent meeting came in December 2021 in Provo, with BYU winning 82–71 before a crowd of more than 15,000.

=== UNLV ===
Utah State and UNLV share a rivalry that dates back to their Big West Conference days, highlighted by intense matchups in the late 1980s and early 1990s. The most infamous chapter came on March 1, 1990, in what became known as the “Water Bomb Game,” when dyed blue water erupted from a vent beneath the UNLV bench at the Dee Glen Smith Spectrum.

The game came shortly after a fight-filled meeting in Las Vegas earlier that season, and UNLV went on to win 84–82 despite the disruption. The Rebels captured the national championship later that year, but the event cemented the series as one of the most colorful rivalries in college basketball. The teams renewed the matchup regularly after Utah State joined the Mountain West in 2013.

=== Boise State ===
Utah State’s rivalry with the Boise State Broncos has intensified over the past two decades, carrying over from their time together in the WAC to the Mountain West. Since 1973–74, Utah State leads the series 39–22, including a 23–4 record in Logan.

The programs have become perennial contenders within the Mountain West, often meeting multiple times each season and occasionally in the conference tournament. Recent matchups include Utah State’s 81–79 home win on January 11, 2025, and an 80–61 victory in Logan during the 2023–24 campaign.

While Boise State has historically dominated the football rivalry, the basketball matchup has been far more balanced and often carries conference title implications. Both schools are set to join the Pac-12 Conference in 2026, ensuring the regional rivalry will continue on a new stage.

== Season-by-season results ==
Season	Head coach	Conference	Overall	Conference Tournament	Postseason
Pacific Coast Athletic Association
1979-80	Rod Tueller	11-2 (1st)	18-9	Semifinals	NCAA, First Round
1980-81	Rod Tueller	5-9 (5th)	12-16	Semifinals	
1981-82	Rod Tueller	2-12 (8th)	4-23	First round	
1982-83	Rod Tueller	10-6 (3rd)	20-9	First round	NCAA, First Round
1983-84	Rod Tueller	12-6 (4th)	19-11	Semifinals	NIT, First Round
1984-85	Rod Tueller	10-8 (T-4th)	17-11	First round	
1985-86	Rod Tueller	8-10 (T-6th)	12-16	First round	
1986-87	Rod Tueller	8-10 (7th)	15-16	First round	
1987-88	Rod Tueller	13-5 (T-2nd)	21-10	First round	NCAA, First Round
Big West Conference
1988-89	Kohn Smith	10-8 (T-4th)	12-16	Quarterfinals	
1989-90	Kohn Smith	8-19 (5th)	14-16	Quarterfinals	
1990-91	Kohn Smith	8-10 (T-4th)	11-17	Quarterfinals	
1991-92	Kohn Smith	10-8 (5th)	16-12	Quarterfinals	
1992-93	Kohn Smith	7-10 (7th)	10-17	Quarterfinals	
1993–94	Larry Eustachy	11–7 (T-2nd)	14–13	Quarterfinals	
1994–95	Larry Eustachy	14–4 (1st)	21–8	Quarterfinals	NIT, First Round
1995–96	Larry Eustachy	10–8 (4th)	18–15	Finals	
1996–97	Larry Eustachy	12–4 (T-1st)	20–9	Semifinals	
1997–98	Larry Eustachy	13–3 (1st)	25–8	Champion	NCAA, First Round
1998–99	Stew Morrill	8–8 (4th)	15–13	Quarterfinals	
1999–00	Stew Morrill	16–0 (1st)	28–6	Champion	NCAA, First Round
2000–01	Stew Morrill	13–3 (2nd)	28–6	Champion	NCAA, Second Round
2001–02	Stew Morrill	13–5 (T-1st)	23–8	Finals	NIT, Opening Round
2002–03	Stew Morrill	12–6 (3rd)	24–9	Champion	NCAA, First Round
2003–04	Stew Morrill	17–1 (T-1st)	25–4	Semifinals	NIT, First Round
2004–05	Stew Morrill	13–5 (2nd)	24–8	Champion	NCAA, First Round
Western Athletic Conference
2005–06	Stew Morrill	11–5 (T-2nd)	23–9	Finals	NCAA, First Round
2006–07	Stew Morrill	9–7 (4th)	23–12	Finals	NIT, First Round
2007–08	Stew Morrill	12–4 (T-1st)	24–11	semifinals	NIT, First Round
2008–09	Stew Morrill	14–2 (1st)	30–5	Champion	NCAA, First Round
2009–10	Stew Morrill	14–2 (1st)	27–8	Finals	NCAA, First Round
2010–11	Stew Morrill	15–1 (1st)	30–3	Champion	NCAA, First Round
2011–12	Stew Morrill	8–6 (4th)	21–16	Quarterfinals	CollegeInsider.com finalists
2012–13	Stew Morrill	8–6 (T-4th)	21–10	Quarterfinals	
Mountain West Conference
2013–14	Stew Morrill	7–11 (T-8th)	18–14	Quarterfinals	
2014–15	Stew Morrill	11–7 (T-4th)	18–13	Quarterfinals	
2015–16	Tim Duryea	7–11 (T-8th)	16–15	Quarterfinals	
2016–17	Tim Duryea	7–11 (T-8th)	14–17	Quarterfinals	
2017–18	Tim Duryea	8–10 (T-7th)	17–17	Semifinals	
2018–19	Craig Smith	15–3 (T-1st)	28–6	Champion	NCAA, First Round
2019–20	Craig Smith	12–6 (T-2nd)	26–8	Champion	NCAA (tournament cancelled)
2020–21	Craig Smith	15–4 (2nd)	20–9	Finals	NCAA, First Round
2021–22	Ryan Odom	8-10 (7th)	18-16	Quarterfinal	NIT, First Round
2022–23	Ryan Odom	13-5 (T-2nd)	26-9	Finals	NCAA, First Round
2023–24	Danny Sprinkle	14-4 (1st)	27-5	Semifinals	NCAA, Second Round
2024–25	Jerrod Calhoun	15-5 (3rd)	26-8	Semifinals	NCAA, First Round
2025–26	Jerrod Calhoun	15-5 (1st)	28-7	Champion	NCAA, Second Round

== Postseason results ==
=== NCAA tournament ===
Utah State has appeared in the NCAA tournament 26 times, compiling a record of 8–27 (.229). The Aggies have earned tournament invitations in eight different decades, reflecting one of the most consistent programs among mid-major schools.

Under coach Larry Eustachy, Utah State returned to the NCAA Tournament in 1998 after a 12-year absence. The program then qualified eight times during Stew Morrill’s tenure (2000, 2001, 2003, 2005, 2006, 2009, 2010, 2011), twice receiving at-large bids after losing the WAC championship game. Despite a 25–3 record and a national top-25 ranking in 2003–04, Utah State was controversially left out of the field, becoming the last-ranked team in NCAA history to miss the tournament.

The Aggies’ most notable win came in the 2001 tournament, when they upset fifth-seeded Ohio State 77–68 in overtime before falling to UCLA in the second round. More recently, Utah State broke a 23-year drought without an NCAA Tournament win in 2024, defeating TCU 88–72 in the first round before falling to top-seeded Purdue in the second round.

In 2025, under first-year head coach Jerrod Calhoun, the Aggies earned a No. 10 seed in the Mountain West’s final season before conference realignment. Utah State fell in the first round to No. 7 seed UCLA, 72–47, concluding a 26–8 campaign that extended the program’s streak of consecutive NCAA appearances to three.

Year	Seed	Round	Opponent	Result
1939		Elite Eight; Regional 3rd Place	Oklahoma; Texas	L 39–50; W 51–49
1962		Round of 25; Sweet Sixteen; Regional 3rd Place	Arizona State; UCLA; Pepperdine	W 78–73; L 62–73; L 78–88
1963		Round of 25	Arizona State	L 75–79^{OT}
1964		Round of 25; Sweet Sixteen; Regional 3rd Place	Arizona State; San Francisco; Seattle	W 92–90; L 58–64; L 71–75
1970		Round of 25; Sweet Sixteen; Elite Eight	UTEP; Santa Clara; No. 2 UCLA	W 91–81; W 69–68; L 79–101
1971		Round of 25	BYU	L 82–91
1975		Round of 32	Montana	L 63–68
1979	10 W	Round of 40	(7) USC	L 67–86
1980	11 W	Round of 48	(6) Clemson	L 73–76
1983	10 MW	Round of 48	(7) Iowa	L 59–64
1988	10 MW	Round of 64	(7) Vanderbilt	L 77–80
1998	13 W	Round of 64	(4) #20 Maryland	L 68–82
2000	12 S	First Round	(5) #20 Connecticut	L 67–75
2001	12 E	First Round; Second Round	(5) Ohio State (4) No. 15 UCLA	W 77–68^{OT} L 50–75
2003	15 W	First Round	(2) No. 6 Kansas	L 61–64
2005	14 MW	First Round	(3) No. 9 Arizona	L 53–66
2006	12 E	First Round	(5) No. 17 Washington	L 61–75
2009	11 W	First Round	(6) No. 23 Marquette	L 57–58
2010	12 S	First Round	(5) No. 23 Texas A&M	L 53–69
2011	12 S	First Round	(5) No. 21 Kansas State	L 68–73
2019	8 MW	First Round	(9) Washington	L 61–78
2020	Tournament canceled			
2021	11 S	First Round	(6) Texas Tech	L 53–65
2023	10 S	First Round	(7) Missouri	L 65–76
2024	8 MW	First Round; Second Round	(9) TCU (1) Purdue	W 88–72; L 67–106
2025	10 MW	First Round	(7) UCLA	L 47–72
2026	9 W	First Round; Second Round	(8) Villanova (1) Arizona	W 86–76; L 66-78

=== NIT ===
The Aggies have appeared in 10 National Invitation Tournaments, with a combined record of 2–10.

Year	Round	Opponent	Result
1960	Quarterfinals; Semifinals; 3rd Place Game	Villanova; Providence; St. Bonaventure	W 73–72; L 62–68; W 94–81
1967	First Round	Rutgers	L 76–78
1978	First Round	Nebraska	L 66–67
1984	First Round	Southwestern Louisiana	L 92–94
1995	First Round	Illinois State	L 87–93
2002	Opening Round	Montana State	L 69–77
2004	First Round	Hawaiʻi	L 74–85
2007	First Round	Michigan	L 58–68
2008	First Round	Illinois State	L 57–61
2022	First Round	Oregon	L 72–83

=== CIT ===
The Aggies appeared in one CollegeInsider.com Tournament. Their record was 4–1.

Year	Round	Opponent	Result
2012	First Round; Second Round; Quarterfinals; Semifinals; Championship	CSU Bakersfield; Idaho; Loyola Marymount; Oakland; Mercer	W 75–69; W 76–56; W 77–69; W 105–81; L 67–70

== Awards and honors ==
Consensus Second Team All-Americans

- Wayne Estes - 1965

Third Team All-Americans

- Cornell Green - 1962
- Wayne Estes - 1964

AP Honorable Mention All-Americans

- Shaler Halimon - 1968
- Marv Roberts - 1969, 1971
- Greg Grant - 1983, 1985, 1986
- Jaycee Carroll - 2007, 2008
- Gary Wilkinson - 2009
- Tai Wesley - 2011
- Sam Merrill - 2019
- Neemias Queta - 2021
- Great Osobor - 2024

Perry Wallace Most Courageous Award (USBWA)

- Connor Odom – 2023 (Note: Shared with Terrence Hargrove of Saint Louis.)

Conference Player of the Year

- Dean Hunger - 1980
- Greg Grant - 1986
- Eric Franson - 1995
- Jaycee Carroll - 2008
- Gary Wilkinson - 2009
- Tai Wesley - 2011
- Sam Merrill - 2019
- Great Osobor - 2024
- Mason Falslev - 2026

First Team All-Conference

- Dean Hunger - 1979, 1980
- Brian Jackson - 1981
- Greg Grant - 1985, 1986
- Kevin Nixon - 1988
- Reid Newey - 1989
- Kendall Youngblood - 1992
- Eric Franson - 1995, 1996
- Marcus Saxon - 1997, 1998
- Troy Rolle - 2000
- Shawn Daniels - 2000, 2001
- Bernard Rock - 2001
- Tony Brown - 2002
- Desmond Penigar - 2002, 2003
- Cardell Butler - 2004
- Mark Brown - 2004
- Spencer Nelson - 2005
- Nate Harris - 2004, 2005, 2006
- Jaycee Carroll - 2007, 2008
- Gary Wilkinson - 2009
- Jared Quayle - 2010
- Tai Wesley - 2010, 2011
- Brockeith Pane - 2011
- Preston Medlin - 2012
- Sam Merrill - 2019, 2020
- Neemias Queta - 2021
- Steven Ashworth - 2023
- Darius Brown II - 2024
- Great Osobor - 2024
- Ian Martinez - 2025
- Mason Falslev - 2026

== Retired numbers ==
The following players have their jerseys retired, but their numbers remain active.

Utah State Aggies retired numbers
No.	Player	Position	Career	Ref.
5	Greg Grant	F	1983–1986	
6	Bert Cook	SG	1950–1952	
20	Jaycee Carroll	SG	2004-2008	
24	Cornell Green	F	1960–1962	
31	Marv Roberts	F / C	1969–1971	
33	Wayne Estes	F	1963–1965	

== NBA/ABA players ==
The following Utah State alumni have appeared in the NBA or ABA.

Name	Years	Draft year	Overall Selection
Ariel Maughan	1946-1951	1946	Undrafted
Bert Cook	1952-1955	1952	17
Pat Dunn	1956-1958	1956	44
Lary Bunce	1967-1969	1967	43
Hal Hale	1967-1968	1967	Undrafted
Shaler Halimon	1968-1973	1968	14
Marv Roberts	1971-1976	1971	45
Nate Williams	1971-1979	1971	1 (Hardship Draft)
Desmond Penigar	2003-2004	2003	Undrafted
Sam Merrill	2020-Present	2020	60
Neemias Queta	2021-Present	2021	39

== See also ==
- Utah State Aggies men's basketball statistical leaders
