= Mason Falslev =

American basketball player (born 2001)

No. 12 – Utah State Aggies
- Position: Shooting guard
- League: Pac-12 Conference

Personal information
- Born: October 30, 2001 (age 25)
- Listed height: 6 ft 4 in (1.93 m)
- Listed weight: 200 lb (91 kg)

Career information
- High school: Sky View (Smithfield, Utah)
- College: Utah State (2023–present)

Career highlights
- Mountain West Player of the Year (2026); First-team All-Mountain West (2026); Second-team All-Mountain West (2025); 2× Mountain West All-Defensive team (2025, 2026)

Mason Falslev (born October 30, 2001) is an American college basketball player for the Utah State Aggies of the Pac-12 Conference.

== Early life ==
Falslev attended Sky View High School in Smithfield, Utah. He was the state MVP in both football and basketball, as he led both teams to state championships. Coming out of high school, Falslev initially committed to play college basketball for the Utah Utes. However, he later flipped his commitment and signed to play with the Utah State Aggies.

== College career ==
As a freshman in 2022–23, Falslev took a redshirt. On February 10, 2024, he scored 25 points in a victory over Boise State. During the 2023–24 season, Falslev played in 34 games, where he averaged 11.3 points, 4.4 rebounds and 2.4 assist per game. After the season, he entered his name into the NCAA transfer portal, but quickly withdrew his name and returned to Utah State. On November 22, 2024, Falslev scored 25 points and 12 rebounds in a win versus Iowa. On December 28, he achieved 16 points, four rebounds, four assists, and a career-high five steals in win versus San Diego State. For his performance during the 2024–25 season, Falslev was named second-team all-Mountain West Conference, while also being named to the all-Mountain West defensive team. He averaged 16.0 points, 5.7 rebounds, 3.1 assists and 1.9 steals per game during the 2025-26 season. Falslev was named Mountain West Player of the Year.
