= Tim Duryea =

American college basketball coach

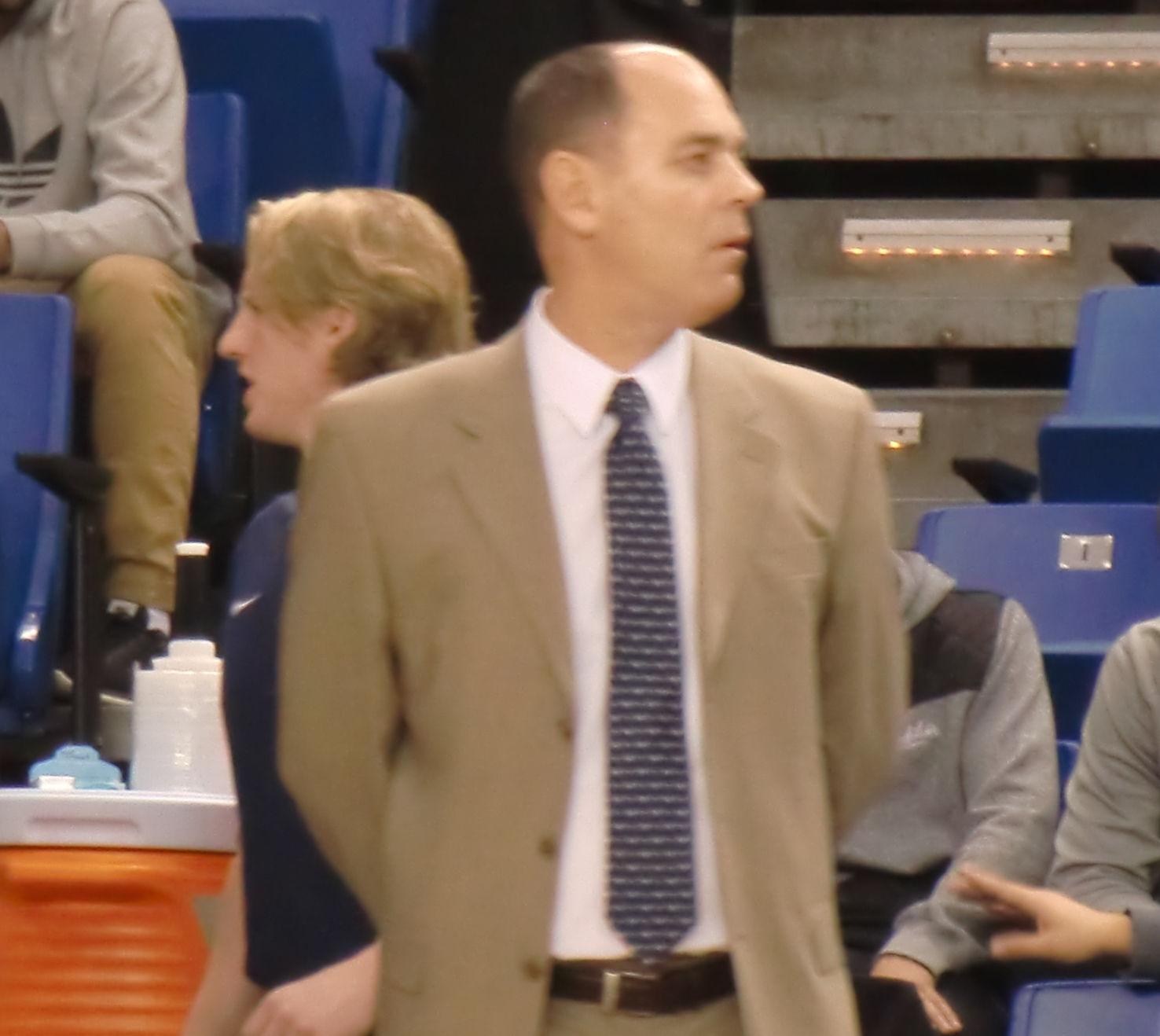
- Duryea in 2015

Current position
- Title: Assistant coach
- Team: Boise State
- Conference: Mountain West

Biographical details
- Born: November 16, 1964 (age 61); Medicine Lodge, Kansas, U.S.

Playing career
- 1984–1985: Pan American
- 1986–1988: North Texas State
- Position: Guard

Coaching career (HC unless noted)
- 1988–1990: Colorado State (assistant)
- 1993–1997: North Texas (assistant)
- 1997–1999: Hutchinson CC (assistant)
- 1999–2001: Hutchinson CC
- 2001–2008: Utah State (assistant)
- 2008–2015: Utah State (assoc. HC)
- 2015–2018: Utah State
- 2018–present: Boise State (assistant)

Head coaching record
- Overall: 44–21 (junior college); 47–49 (college)

Timothy Lee Duryea (born November 16, 1964) is an American college basketball coach who was men's basketball head coach at Utah State, and is currently an assistant coach at Boise State.

== Early life and education ==
Born in Medicine Lodge, Kansas, Duryea grew up in Denton, Texas and graduated from Denton High School. Duryea played college basketball first at Pan American University (now the University of Texas Rio Grande Valley) with the Broncs in the 1984–85 season, then transferred to North Texas State University (now the University of North Texas) and played for the Mean Green from 1986 to 1988. A guard at both schools, Duryea was a team captain as a senior and helped North Texas State win the Southland Conference men's basketball tournament, which qualified the team for the 1988 NCAA Tournament. Duryea graduated from North Texas State in 1988 with a degree in business administration.

== Coaching career ==
Duryea began his coaching career in 1988 at Colorado State as an assistant for Boyd "Tiny" Grant and remained on staff for two seasons. From 1993 to 1997, Duryea was an assistant at North Texas for Tim Jankovich. Duryea then joined Hutchinson Community College as an assistant in 1997 and was promoted to head coach in 1999. In two seasons, Duryea had a 44–21 record at Hutchinson.

On June 26, 2001, Stew Morrill added Duryea to his staff at Utah State as an assistant coach. In 2008, Morrill promoted Duryea to associate head coach. In fourteen total seasons with Duryea on staff, Utah State made six NCAA Tournaments and won five conference championships (the Big West in 2003 and Western Athletic Conference four straight years from 2008 to 2011). Duryea praised Morrill in a 2006 interview with Deseret News: "He provides a really stable working environment because he's so steady. He knows how he wants to run a program."

After Morrill retired, Utah State hired Duryea as head coach on March 30, 2015. In his first season as head coach, Utah State finished 16–15 (7–11 Mountain West Conference).

On March 11, 2018, the Utah State University Athletic Department announced that it had fired Duryea from his coaching duties.

On April 24, 2018, Boise State hired Duryea as an assistant coach.

== Head coaching record ==
=== Junior college ===
Record table
Season	Team	Overall	Conference	Standing	Postseason
Hutchinson Blue Dragons (Kansas Jayhawk Community College Conference) (1999–2001)
1999–2000	Hutchinson	25–8	12–4	T–3rd	
2000–01	Hutchinson	19–13	8–8	6th (West)	
Hutchinson:		44–21 (.677)	20–12 (.625)		
Total:		44–21 (.677)			

=== College ===
Record table
Season	Team	Overall	Conference	Standing	Postseason
Utah State Aggies (Mountain West Conference) (2015–2018)
2015–16	Utah State	16–15	7–11	T–8th	
2016–17	Utah State	14–17	7–11	T–8th	
2017–18	Utah State	17–17	8–10	T–7th	
Utah State:		47–49 (.490)	22–32 (.407)		
Total:		47–49 (.490)			
National champion Postseason invitational champion Conference regular season champion Conference regular season and conference tournament champion Division regular season champion Division regular season and conference tournament champion Conference tournament champion
