= Herschel Bullen =

American politician

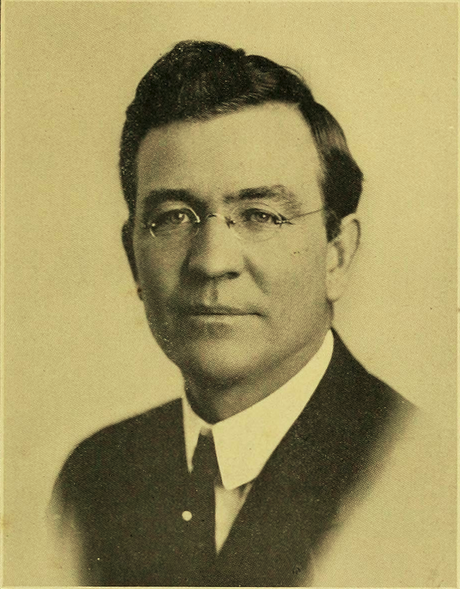

Member of the Utah State Senate
- In office 1907–1910

Personal details
- Born: November 13, 1870 Richmond, Utah Territory
- Died: February 2, 1966 (aged 95) Logan, Utah, U.S.
- Party: Republican
- Spouse: Mary Hendricks
- Children: Reed Bullen
- Education: University of Deseret
- Occupation: Businessman, politician

Herschel Bullen (November 13, 1870 – February 2, 1966) was an American businessman, politician and leader in the Church of Jesus Christ of Latter-day Saints (LDS Church) in Logan, Utah.

== Biography ==
Bullen was born in Richmond, Utah. He graduated from the University of Deseret (now the University of Utah) in 1890 and then worked as a farmer and school teacher in both Richmond and later Lewiston, Utah. Bullen served an LDS mission in England from 1894 to 1897. Shortly before leaving he had married Mary Hendricks.

Bullen helped form the Logan Republican, a newspaper with political leaning towards the Republican Party, in 1903. From 1900 to 1904 Bullen was the president of the Logan School board. In 1906 he was elected to the Utah State Senate, serving from 1907 to 1910. He also was a professor at Brigham Young College in Logan for a time. In 1928, Bullen served as a delegate to the Republican National Convention.

Bullen was also involved in land development, organizing the Promontory-Curlew Land Company along with Joseph Howell and David Eccles. This company owned 400,000 acres (1,600 km^{2}) of land in Box Elder County, Utah and Malad County, Idaho on which they encouraged settlers to engage in dry farming. He was the secretary and treasurer of the company until it disbanded in 1959.

Bullen was a member of the board of trustees of Utah State University from 1949 to 1953.

Bullen's half-brother Roy Bullen was a mayor of Logan. Herschel's son Reed Bullen served in the Utah State Senate, representing the same district as his father.

Herschel Bullen died in Logan in 1966.
