= 2019–20 Mountain West Conference men's basketball season =

- League: NCAA Division I
- Sport: Basketball
- Duration: November 2019 through March 2020
- Teams: 11
- TV partner(s): ESPN, CBSSN, CBS

Regular Season
- Season champions: San Diego State

Tournament
- Champions: Utah State
- Runners-up: San Diego State

Mountain West Conference men's basketball seasons
- ← 2018–19 2020–21 →

2019–20 Mountain West Conference men's basketball standings
| | Conf. | | | | Overall |
| Team | W | | L | PCT | W | | L | PCT |
|---|---|---|---|---|---|---|---|---|
| No. 6 San Diego State | 17 | – | 1 | .944 | 30 | – | 2 | .938 |
| Utah State † | 12 | – | 6 | .667 | 26 | – | 8 | .765 |
| Nevada | 12 | – | 6 | .667 | 19 | – | 12 | .613 |
| UNLV | 12 | – | 6 | .667 | 17 | – | 15 | .531 |
| Boise State | 11 | – | 7 | .611 | 20 | – | 12 | .625 |
| Colorado State | 11 | – | 7 | .611 | 20 | – | 12 | .625 |
| New Mexico | 7 | – | 11 | .389 | 19 | – | 14 | .576 |
| Fresno State | 7 | – | 11 | .389 | 11 | – | 19 | .367 |
| Air Force | 5 | – | 13 | .278 | 12 | – | 20 | .375 |
| San Jose State | 3 | – | 15 | .167 | 7 | – | 24 | .226 |
| Wyoming | 2 | – | 16 | .111 | 9 | – | 24 | .273 |
† Conference tournament winner Rankings from AP poll

The 2019–20 Mountain West Conference men's basketball season began with practices in October 2019, followed by the start of the 2019–20 NCAA Division I men's basketball season in November. Conference play began in December 2019 and concluded in February 2020. This season marked the 20th season of Mountain West Conference basketball.

== Preseason ==
=== Coaching changes ===
On March 15, 2019, UNLV head coach Marvin Menzies was fired after three seasons. On March 27, 2019, South Dakota State head coach T. J. Otzelberger was announced as the new head coach of UNLV.

On April 7, 2019, Nevada head coach Eric Musselman resigned after four seasons to become the head coach of Arkansas. On April 11, 2019, former UCLA and New Mexico head coach Steve Alford was announced as the new head coach of Nevada.

=== Media Day ===
The Mountain West Men's Basketball Media Day was held at Green Valley Ranch in Henderson, Nevada.

==== Preseason poll ====
Utah State received all 17 first-place votes in the conference media poll.

| Place | Team | Points |
|---|---|---|
| 1 | Utah State (17) | 187 |
| 2 | San Diego State | 150 |
| 3 | New Mexico | 141 |
| 4 | Nevada | 135 |
| 5 | Boise State | 128 |
| 6 | Fresno State | 103 |
| 7 | UNLV | 89 |
| 8 | Air Force | 76 |
| 9 | Colorado State | 59 |
| 10 | Wyoming | 36 |
| 11 | San Jose State | 17 |
(first place votes)

==== Preseason awards ====
| Honor | Player | Team |
|---|---|---|
| Preseason Player of the Year | Sam Merrill | Utah State |
| Preseason Newcomer of the Year | Malachi Flynn | San Diego State |
| Preseason Freshman of the Year | K.J. Hymes | Nevada |

==== Preseason All-Conference team ====
| Position | Player | Class | Team |
|---|---|---|---|
| F | Lavelle Scottie | Sr. | Air Force |
| G | Derrick Alston Jr. | Jr. | Boise State |
| F/C | Nico Carvacho | Sr. | Colorado State |
| G | Sam Merrill | Sr. | Utah State |
| C | Neemias Queta | So. | Utah State |

=== Watchlists ===
| Player | Team | Watchlist(s) |
|---|---|---|
| Sam Merrill | Utah State | Jerry West Award; Naismith College Player of the Year; John R. Wooden Award |
| Neemias Queta | Utah State | Kareem Abdul-Jabbar Award; John R. Wooden Award |
| Nico Carvacho | Colorado State | Kareem Abdul–Jabbar Award |

== Regular season ==
=== Conference matrix ===
| | Air Force | Boise St | Colorado St | Fresno St | Nevada | New Mexico | San Diego St | San Jose St | UNLV | Utah St | Wyoming |
|---|---|---|---|---|---|---|---|---|---|---|---|
| vs. Air Force | — | 1–1 | 1–0 | 1–0 | 2–0 | 1–0 | 1–0 | 1–1 | 1–0 | 1–1 | 0–1 |
| vs. Boise State | 1–1 | — | 0–1 | 0–1 | 1–1 | 1–0 | 2–0 | 0–1 | 0–1 | 1–1 | 0–2 |
| vs. Colorado State | 0–1 | 1–0 | — | 0–2 | 1–1 | 0–1 | 1–0 | 0–1 | 0–1 | 2–0 | 0–2 |
| vs. Fresno State | 0–1 | 1–0 | 2–0 | — | 0–0 | 1–1 | 2–0 | 0–2 | 2–0 | 2–0 | 0–1 |
| vs. Nevada | 0–2 | 1–1 | 1–1 | 0–0 | — | 0–1 | 1–0 | 1–1 | 0–2 | 1–0 | 0–1 |
| vs. New Mexico | 0–1 | 0–1 | 1–0 | 1–1 | 1–0 | — | 2–0 | 1–1 | 2–0 | 0–0 | 0–2 |
| vs. San Diego State | 0–1 | 0–2 | 0–1 | 0–2 | 0–1 | 0–2 | — | 0–1 | 0–1 | 0–2 | 0–2 |
| vs. San Jose State | 1–1 | 1–0 | 1–0 | 2–0 | 1–1 | 1–1 | 1–0 | — | 1–0 | 1–0 | 1–0 |
| vs. UNLV | 0–1 | 1–0 | 1–0 | 0–2 | 2–0 | 0–2 | 1–0 | 0–1 | — | 1–1 | 0–1 |
| vs. Utah State | 1–1 | 1–1 | 0–2 | 0–2 | 0–1 | 0–0 | 2–0 | 0–1 | 1–1 | — | 0–1 |
| vs. Wyoming | 1–0 | 2–0 | 2–0 | 1–0 | 1–0 | 2–0 | 2–0 | 0–1 | 1–0 | 1–0 | — |
| Total | 4–10 | 9–6 | 9–5 | 5–10 | 9–5 | 6–8 | 15–0 | 3–11 | 8−6 | 10–5 | 1–13 |

== All-Conference Teams and Awards ==
| Award | Recipients |
|---|---|
| Player of the Year | Malachi Flynn (San Diego State) |
| Coach of the Year | Brian Dutcher (San Diego State) |
| Newcomer of the Year | Jalen Harris (Nevada) |
| Defensive Player of the Year | Malachi Flynn (San Diego State) |
| Sixth Man of the Year | Nisré Zouzoua (Nevada) |
| Freshman of the Year | Isaiah Stevens (Colorado State) |
| First Team | Malachi Flynn (San Diego State); Jalen Harris (Nevada); Sam Merrill (Utah State); Matt Mitchell (San Diego State); Bryce Hamilton (UNLV) |
| Second Team | Yanni Wetzell (San Diego State); Neemias Queta (Utah State); Nico Carvacho (Colorado State); Justinian Jessup (Boise State); Derrick Alston Jr. (Boise State); Jazz Johnson (Nevada) |
| Third Team | Justin Bean (Utah State); Lavell Scottie (Air Force); Seneca Knight (San Jose State); Isaiah Stevens (Colorado State); Amauri Hardy (UNLV) |
| Honorable Mention | KJ Feagin (San Diego State); Hunter Maldonado (Wyoming); Lindsey Drew (Nevada); Nate Grimes (Fresno State); Orlando Robinson (Fresno State) |
| All-Defensive Team | Malachi Flynn (San Diego State); KJ Feagin (San Diego State); Neemias Queta (Utah State); Lindsey Drew (Nevada); Justin Bean (Utah State) |
