= 2019–20 New Mexico Lobos men's basketball team =

2019–20 New Mexico Lobos men's basketball
- Conference: Mountain West Conference
- Record: 19–14 (7–11 MW)
- Head coach: Paul Weir (3rd season)
- Assistant coaches: Jerome Robinson; Brandon Mason; Dan McHale
- Home arena: Dreamstyle Arena

2019–20 Mountain West Conference men's basketball standings
	Conf.				Overall
Team	W		L	PCT	W		L	PCT
No. 6 San Diego State	17	–	1	.944	30	–	2	.938
Utah State †	12	–	6	.667	26	–	8	.765
Nevada	12	–	6	.667	19	–	12	.613
UNLV	12	–	6	.667	17	–	15	.531
Boise State	11	–	7	.611	20	–	12	.625
Colorado State	11	–	7	.611	20	–	12	.625
New Mexico	7	–	11	.389	19	–	14	.576
Fresno State	7	–	11	.389	11	–	19	.367
Air Force	5	–	13	.278	12	–	20	.375
San Jose State	3	–	15	.167	7	–	24	.226
Wyoming	2	–	16	.111	9	–	24	.273
† Conference tournament winner Rankings from AP poll

The 2019–20 New Mexico Lobos men's basketball team represented the University of New Mexico during the 2019–20 NCAA Division I men's basketball season. The Lobos were led by third-year head coach Paul Weir. They played their home games at The Pit, formally known as Dreamstyle Arena, in Albuquerque, New Mexico as members of the Mountain West Conference. They finished the season 19–14, 7–11 in Mountain West play to finish in a tie for seventh place. They defeated San Jose State in the first round of the Mountain West tournament before losing in the quarterfinals to Utah State.

== Previous season ==
The Lobos finished 14–18, 7–11 in Mountain West play to finish in seventh place. In the Mountain West tournament, they defeated Wyoming in the first round before losing to Utah State.

== Offseason ==
=== Departures ===
Name	Number	Pos.	Height	Weight	Year	Hometown	Reason for departure
Dane Kuiper	14	G/F	6'7"	205	Senior	Wasilla, AK	Graduated
Vladimir Pinchuk	15	F/C	6'11"	235	Sophomore	Hagen, Germany	Transferred to San Diego
Karim Ezzeddine	25	F	6'8"	225	Junior	Paris, France	Transferred
Anthony Mathis	32	G	6'3"	175	Senior	West Linn, OR	Transferred to Oregon

=== Incoming transfers ===
Name	Number	Pos.	Height	Weight	Year	Hometown	Previous college
Vante Hendrix	14	G	6'5"	190	RS Sophomore	Woodland Hills, CA	Transferred from Utah in November 2018. Under NCAA transfer rules, Vante Hendrix sat out until December 17, 2019. He has three and a half years of remaining eligibility.

=== 2019 recruiting class ===
College recruiting information
Name	Hometown	School	Height	Weight	Commit date
Emmanuel Andrew; PF	Kearns, UT	Kearns High School	6 ft 7 in (2.01 m)	195 lb (88 kg)	Oct 23, 2018
Emmanuel Andrew; PF	Recruit ratings: Scout: Rivals: 247Sports: ESPN: (NR)				
Overall recruit ranking:
Note: In many cases, Scout, Rivals, 247Sports, On3, and ESPN may conflict in their listings of height and weight.; In these cases, the average was taken. ESPN grades are on a 100-point scale.; Sources:

=== 2020 recruiting class ===
College recruiting information (2020)
Name	Hometown	School	Height	Weight	Commit date
Bayron Matos-Garcia; C	Chattanooga, TN	Hamilton Heights Christian Academy	6 ft 8 in (2.03 m)	195 lb (88 kg)	Oct 5, 2019
Bayron Matos-Garcia; C	Recruit ratings: Scout: Rivals: 247Sports: ESPN: (80)				
Nolan Dorsey; PG	Raleigh, NC	Millbrook High School	6 ft 4 in (1.93 m)	195 lb (88 kg)	Oct 5, 2019
Nolan Dorsey; PG	Recruit ratings: Scout: Rivals: 247Sports: ESPN: (NR)				
Javonte Johnson; SF	Colorado Springs, CO	Cheyenne Mountain High School	6 ft 6 in (1.98 m)	185 lb (84 kg)	Oct 17, 2019
Javonte Johnson; SF	Recruit ratings: Scout: Rivals: 247Sports: ESPN: (NR)				
Overall recruit ranking:
Note: In many cases, Scout, Rivals, 247Sports, On3, and ESPN may conflict in their listings of height and weight.; In these cases, the average was taken. ESPN grades are on a 100-point scale.; Sources:

== Roster ==
2019–20 New Mexico Lobos men's basketball team
Players
Coaches

Pos.	#	Name	Height	Weight	Year	Previous school	Hometown
G	0	Zane Martin	6 ft 4 in (1.93 m)	205 lb (93 kg)	RS Jr	Towson	Philadelphia, PA
F	1	Corey Manigault	6 ft 9 in (2.06 m)	225 lb (102 kg)	Sr	Indian Hills C.C.	Suitland, MD
G/F	2	Vance Jackson	6 ft 9 in (2.06 m)	230 lb (104 kg)	RS Jr	UConn	Los Angeles, CA
PG	3	Keith McGee	6 ft 3 in (1.91 m)	180 lb (82 kg)	RS Jr	South Plains College	Rochester, NY
G	4	Tavian Percy	6 ft 6 in (1.98 m)	205 lb (93 kg)	So	Pasadena HS	Miami, FL
G	5	JaQuan Lyle	6 ft 5 in (1.96 m)	210 lb (95 kg)	RS Sr	Ohio State	Evansville, IN
G/F	10	Makuach Maluach	6 ft 7 in (2.01 m)	195 lb (88 kg)	Jr	Newington College	Sydney, NSW, AUS
G	11	JJ Caldwell	6 ft 1 in (1.85 m)	185 lb (84 kg)	RS Jr	Texas A&M	Houston, TX
G	12	Daniel Headdings (W)	6 ft 2 in (1.88 m)	185 lb (84 kg)	Fr	Wasilla HS	Wasilla, AK
G	14	Vante Hendrix	6 ft 5 in (1.96 m)	195 lb (88 kg)	RS So	Utah	Woodland Hills, CA
F	15	Carlton Bragg Jr.	6 ft 10 in (2.08 m)	225 lb (102 kg)	RS Sr	Arizona State	Cleveland, OH
G	20	Clay Patterson (W)	6 ft 1 in (1.85 m)	175 lb (79 kg)	RS So	Fort Lewis	Rio Rancho, NM
G	22	Drue Drinnon	6 ft 0 in (1.83 m)	175 lb (79 kg)	So	NSU University School	Smyrna, GA
F	23	Emmanuel Kuac	6 ft 6 in (1.98 m)	195 lb (88 kg)	Fr	Kearns HS	Calgary, AB
G	30	Kurt Wegscheider (W)	6 ft 3 in (1.91 m)	185 lb (84 kg)	Fr	NBA Academy Africa	Bangui, CAR
F	33	Jordan Arroyo (W)	6 ft 7 in (2.01 m)	220 lb (100 kg)	So	Atrisco Heritage Academy	Albuquerque, NM

Head coach

- Paul Weir (York)

Assistant coach(es)

- Chris Harriman (Augusta State)
- Brandon Mason (New Mexico State)
- Dan McHale (Kentucky)

Legend

- (C) Team captain
- (S) Suspended
- (I) Ineligible
- (W) Walk-on
- Injured
- Current redshirt

Roster

== Schedule and results ==
Date time, TV	Rank^{#}	Opponent^{#}	Result	Record	Site (attendance) city, state
Regular season
Nov 6, 2019*; 7:00 pm		Eastern New Mexico	W 92–71	1–0	Dreamstyle Arena (9,501); Albuquerque, NM
Nov 9, 2019*; 7:00 pm		Cal State Northridge	W 97–70	2–0	Dreamstyle Arena (10,335); Albuquerque, NM
Nov 13, 2019*; 7:00 pm		Green Bay; Legends Classic campus-site game	W 93–78	3–0	Dreamstyle Arena (10,137); Albuquerque, NM
Nov 16, 2019*; 4:00 pm		McNeese State; Legends Classic campus-site game	W 90–80	4–0	Dreamstyle Arena (10,501); Albuquerque, NM
Nov 19, 2019*; 7:00 pm		at UTEP	L 63–66	4–1	Don Haskins Center (6,171); El Paso, TX
Nov 21, 2019*; 7:00 pm		at New Mexico State; Rio Grande Rivalry	W 78–77	5–1	Pan American Center (7,268); Las Cruces, NM
Nov 25, 2019*; 7:30 pm, ESPNews		vs. No. 18 Auburn; Legends Classic semifinals	L 59–84	5–2	Barclays Center (6,812); Brooklyn, NY
Nov 26, 2019*; 3:00 pm, ESPN2		vs. Wisconsin; Legends Classic 3rd place game	W 59–50	6–2	Barclays Center (6,420); Brooklyn, NY
Dec 1, 2019*; 1:00 pm, ATTSNRM		Montana	W 72–63	7–2	Dreamstyle Arena (10,503); Albuquerque, NM
Dec 4, 2019; 7:00 pm, Stadium		Boise State	W 80–78	8–2 (1–0)	Dreamstyle Arena (10,301); Albuquerque, NM
Dec 7, 2019; 2:00 pm, ATTSNRM		at Wyoming	W 79–65	9–2 (2–0)	Arena-Auditorium (3,659); Laramie, WY
Dec 14, 2019*; 5:00 pm, ATTSNRM		New Mexico State; Rio Grande Rivalry	W 69–62	10–2	Dreamstyle Arena (14,488); Albuquerque, NM
Dec 17, 2019*; 7:00 pm		Grand Canyon	W 91–71	11–2	Dreamstyle Arena (10,925); Albuquerque, NM
Dec 22, 2019*; 12:30 pm		Houston Baptist	W 107–88	12–2	Dreamstyle Arena (10,423); Albuquerque, NM
Dec 29, 2019*; 2:00 pm		UC Davis	W 74–69	13–2	Dreamstyle Arena (10,693); Albuquerque, NM
Jan 1, 2020; 8:00 pm		at San Jose State	L 85–88	13–3 (2–1)	Provident Credit Union Event Center (1,288); San Jose, CA
Jan 7, 2020; 9:00 pm, ESPNU		Fresno State	W 78–64	14–3 (3–1)	Dreamstyle Arena (10,010); Albuquerque, NM
Jan 11, 2020; 4:00 pm, Stadium		Air Force	W 84–78	15–3 (4–1)	Dreamstyle Arena (11,014); Albuquerque, NM
Jan 15, 2020; 7:00 pm, ESPN3		at Colorado State	L 72–105	15–4 (4–2)	Moby Arena (2,502); Fort Collins, CO
Jan 18, 2020; 4:00 pm, CBSSN		at UNLV	L 78–99	15–5 (4–3)	Thomas & Mack Center (9,022); Paradise, NV
Jan 21, 2020; 8:00 pm, ATTSNRM		San Jose State	W 86–59	16–5 (5–3)	Dreamstyle Arena (10,016); Albuquerque, NM
Jan 25, 2020; 6:00 pm, CBSSN		at Nevada	L 74–96	16–6 (5–4)	Lawlor Events Center (8,979); Reno, NV
Jan 29, 2020; 7:00 pm, CBSSN		No. 4 San Diego State	L 57–85	16–7 (5–5)	Dreamstyle Arena (13,241); Albuquerque, NM
Feb 1, 2020; 3:00 pm, ATTSNRM		at Fresno State	L 77–82	16–8 (5–6)	Save Mart Center (5,144); Fresno, CA
Feb 8, 2020; 4:00 pm, Stadium		Wyoming	W 97–68	17–8 (6–6)	Dreamstyle Arena (10,732); Albuquerque, NM
Feb 11, 2020; 9:00 pm, ESPN2		at No. 4 San Diego State	L 59–82	17–9 (6–7)	Viejas Arena (12,414); San Diego, CA
Feb 15, 2020; 4:00 pm, CBSSN		UNLV	L 73–78	17–10 (6–8)	Dreamstyle Arena (11,794); Albuquerque, NM
Feb 18, 2020; 7:00 pm, ESPNU		Nevada	L 74–88	17–11 (6–9)	Dreamstyle Arena (12,032); Albuquerque, NM
Feb 23, 2020; 2:00 pm, CBSSN		at Boise State	L 61–74	17–12 (6–10)	ExtraMile Arena (5,809); Boise, ID
Feb 26, 2020; 7:00 pm, ESPN3		at Air Force	L 58–60	17–13 (6–11)	Clune Arena (1,925); Colorado Springs, CO
Feb 29, 2020; 8:00 pm, CBSSN		Utah State	W 66–64	18–13 (7–11)	Dreamstyle Arena (11,215); Albuquerque, NM
Mountain West tournament
Mar 4, 2020; 3:30 pm, Stadium	(7)	vs. (10) San Jose State; First round	W 79–66	19–13	Thomas & Mack Center (5,198); Paradise, NV
Mar 5, 2020; 7:00 pm, CBSSN	(7)	vs. (2) Utah State; Quarterfinals	L 70–75	19–14	Thomas & Mack Center (7,723); Paradise, NV
*Non-conference game. ^{#}Rankings from AP Poll. (#) Tournament seedings in parentheses. All times are in Mountain Time.
