= 2019–20 Wyoming Cowboys basketball team =

American college basketball season

2019–20 Wyoming Cowboys basketball
- Conference: Mountain West Conference
- Record: 9–24 (2–16 MW)
- Head coach: Allen Edwards (4th season)
- Assistant coaches: Jeremy Shyatt; Shaun Vandiver; Matt Wise
- Home arena: Arena-Auditorium

2019–20 Mountain West Conference men's basketball standings
| | Conf. | | | | Overall |
| Team | W | | L | PCT | W | | L | PCT |
|---|---|---|---|---|---|---|---|---|
| No. 6 San Diego State | 17 | – | 1 | .944 | 30 | – | 2 | .938 |
| Utah State † | 12 | – | 6 | .667 | 26 | – | 8 | .765 |
| Nevada | 12 | – | 6 | .667 | 19 | – | 12 | .613 |
| UNLV | 12 | – | 6 | .667 | 17 | – | 15 | .531 |
| Boise State | 11 | – | 7 | .611 | 20 | – | 12 | .625 |
| Colorado State | 11 | – | 7 | .611 | 20 | – | 12 | .625 |
| New Mexico | 7 | – | 11 | .389 | 19 | – | 14 | .576 |
| Fresno State | 7 | – | 11 | .389 | 11 | – | 19 | .367 |
| Air Force | 5 | – | 13 | .278 | 12 | – | 20 | .375 |
| San Jose State | 3 | – | 15 | .167 | 7 | – | 24 | .226 |
| Wyoming | 2 | – | 16 | .111 | 9 | – | 24 | .273 |
† Conference tournament winner Rankings from AP poll

The 2019–20 Wyoming Cowboys basketball team represented the University of Wyoming during the 2019–20 NCAA Division I men's basketball season. They were led by Allen Edwards in his fourth and final year as head coach at Wyoming. The Cowboys played their home games at the Arena-Auditorium in Laramie, Wyoming as members of the Mountain West Conference. They finished the season 9–24, 2–16 in Mountain West play to finish in last place. As the 11 seed, they upset Colorado State and Nevada to reach the semifinals of the Mountain West tournament where they lost to Utah State. They became the first ever 11 seed to win a game at the Mountain West tournament.

On March 9, 2020, head coach Allen Edwards was fired. He finished at Wyoming with a four-year record of 60–76.

== Previous season ==
The Cowboys finished the 2018–19 season 8–24, 4–14 in Mountain West play to finish in tenth place. They lost to New Mexico in the first round of the Mountain West tournament. They did not compete in a post-season tournament.

== Offseason ==
=== Departures ===
| Name | Number | Pos. | Height | Weight | Year | Hometown | Reason for departure |
|---|---|---|---|---|---|---|---|
| Justin James | 1 | G | 6'7" | 180 | Senior | Port Saint Lucie, FL | Graduated/2019 NBA draft |
| Tariq Johnson | 5 | G | 6'5" | 200 | Freshman | College Park, MD | Medical Disqualification |
| Trace Young | 11 | G/F | 6'9" | 210 | Freshman | Owensboro, KY | Transferred to John A. Logan College |
| Bradley Belt | 12 | G | 6'4" | 205 | Freshman | Huntsville, AL | Dismissed (Violation of Team Rules) |
| Jordan Naughton | 33 | F | 6'10" | 225 | Senior | Rancho Cucamonga, CA | Graduated |

=== Incoming transfers ===
| Name | Number | Pos. | Height | Weight | Year | Hometown | Previous School |
|---|---|---|---|---|---|---|---|
| Greg Milton III | 12 | G | 6'3" | 185 | Sophomore | Elk Grove, CA | Junior college transfer from Sacramento City College |
| Tyler Morman | 15 | F | 6'9" | 220 | Junior | Mableton, GA | Junior college transfer from Florida SouthWestern State College |

=== 2019 recruiting class ===
College recruiting information
| Name | Hometown | School | Height | Weight | Commit date |
|---|---|---|---|---|---|
| Kenny Foster; SG | Aurora, CO | Smoky Hill HS | 6 ft 4 in (1.93 m) | 190 lb (86 kg) | Sep 21, 2018 |
| Kenny Foster; SG | Recruit ratings: Scout: Rivals: 247Sports: ESPN: | | | | |
| Kwane Marble Jr. SG | Denver, CO | Denver East HS | 6 ft 5 in (1.96 m) | 185 lb (84 kg) | Jan 6, 2019 |
| Kwane Marble Jr. SG | Recruit ratings: Scout: Rivals: 247Sports: ESPN: | | | | |
| Javier Turner; PF | Omaha, NE | Omaha Northwest HS | 6 ft 9 in (2.06 m) | 225 lb (102 kg) | Apr 24, 2019 |
| Javier Turner; PF | Recruit ratings: Scout: Rivals: 247Sports: ESPN: | | | | |
Overall recruit ranking: Scout: – Rivals: –
Note: In many cases, Scout, Rivals, 247Sports, On3, and ESPN may conflict in their listings of height and weight.; In these cases, the average was taken. ESPN grades are on a 100-point scale.; Sources: "ESPN – Wyoming Cowboys Basketball Recruiting 2019". ESPN.; "2019 Team Ranking". Rivals.

=== Media Day ===
The Mountain West Men's Basketball Media Day was held at Green Valley Ranch in Henderson, Nevada on October 15, 2019. Wyoming was picked to finish 10th in the conference, ahead of only San Jose State. No Wyoming players were selected to the preseason All-Conference team.

== Roster ==
2019–20 Wyoming Cowboys men's basketball team
Players
Coaches

| Pos. | # | Name | Height | Weight | Year | Previous school | Hometown |
|---|---|---|---|---|---|---|---|
| G | 0 | Jake Hendricks | 6 ft 5 in (1.96 m) | 170 lb (77 kg) | RS Sr | Sky View HS; College of Southern Idaho | Smithfield, UT |
| G | 2 | A. J. Banks | 6 ft 2 in (1.88 m) | 163 lb (74 kg) | Sr | Cheyenne High School; Pratt CC | Las Vegas, NV |
| G | 3 | Kwane Marble II | 6 ft 6 in (1.98 m) | 195 lb (88 kg) | Fr | Denver East HS | Denver, CO |
| G | 5 | Haize Fornstrom (W) | 6 ft 4 in (1.93 m) | 185 lb (84 kg) | So | Pine Bluffs HS | Pine Bluffs, WY |
| F | 10 | Hunter Thompson | 6 ft 10 in (2.08 m) | 235 lb (107 kg) | RS So | Pine Bluffs HS | Pine Bluffs, WY |
| G/F | 11 | T. J. Taylor | 6 ft 6 in (1.98 m) | 197 lb (89 kg) | So | Hillcrest Prep | Chesapeake, VA |
| G | 12 | Greg Milton III | 6 ft 3 in (1.91 m) | 185 lb (84 kg) | So | Cosumnes Oaks HS; Sacramento City College | Elk Grove, CA |
| F | 13 | Brandon Porter | 6 ft 8 in (2.03 m) | 193 lb (88 kg) | So | Washington Academy | Virginia Beach, VA |
| F | 14 | Austin Mueller | 6 ft 6 in (1.98 m) | 210 lb (95 kg) | RS So | ThunderRidge HS | Highlands Ranch, Colorado |
| F | 15 | Tyler Morman | 6 ft 9 in (2.06 m) | 220 lb (100 kg) | Jr | Pebblebrook HS; Florida SouthWestern State College | Mableton, GA |
| G | 22 | Kenny Foster | 6 ft 5 in (1.96 m) | 190 lb (86 kg) | Fr | Smoky Hill HS | Aurora, CO |
| G | 24 | Hunter Maldonado | 6 ft 7 in (2.01 m) | 200 lb (91 kg) | RS So | Vista Ridge HS | Colorado Springs, CO |
| F | 31 | Javier Turner | 6 ft 11 in (2.11 m) | 230 lb (104 kg) | Fr | Omaha Northwest HS | Omaha, NE |
| G | 55 | Danny Gosar (W) | 6 ft 4 in (1.93 m) | 180 lb (82 kg) | Fr | Pinedale HS | Pinedale, WY |

Head coach

- Allen Edwards (Kentucky)

Assistant coach(es)

- Jeremy Shyatt (Clemson)
- Shaun Vandiver (Colorado)
- Matt Wise (Transylvania)

Legend

- (C) Team captain
- (S) Suspended
- (I) Ineligible
- (W) Walk-on
- Injured
- Current redshirt

Roster
Last update: October 11, 2019

== Statistics ==
| Player | GP | GS | MPG | FG% | 3FG% | FT% | RPG | APG | SPG | BPG | PPG |
|---|---|---|---|---|---|---|---|---|---|---|---|
| A.J. Banks | 33 | 30 | 23.6 | .491 | .394 | .706 | 2.7 | 1.7 | 0.7 | 0.3 | 4.8 |
| Haize Fornstrom | 18 | 0 | 2.1 | .750 | 1.000 | .500 | 0.3 | 0.1 | 0.0 | 0.0 | 0.5 |
| Kenny Foster | 32 | 6 | 20.5 | .342 | .244 | .710 | 2.5 | 1.1 | 0.4 | 0.1 | 4.8 |
| Jake Hendricks | 33 | 33 | 34.2 | .334 | .327 | .818 | 3.9 | 1.2 | 1.1 | 0.0 | 10.4 |
| Hunter Maldonado | 33 | 33 | 35.3 | .422 | .295 | .708 | 5.8 | 4.0 | 1.2 | 0.5 | 15.8 |
| Kwane Marble II | 27 | 11 | 19.5 | .484 | .365 | .761 | 2.8 | 1.0 | 1.1 | 0.2 | 8.2 |
| Greg Milton III | 33 | 3 | 14.6 | .383 | .322 | .679 | 1.7 | 0.8 | 0.2 | 0.0 | 3.8 |
| Tyler Morman | 2 | 1 | 14.0 | 1.000 | .000 | .000 | 2.5 | 0.5 | 0.0 | 0.5 | 1.0 |
| Austin Mueller | 12 | 3 | 15.5 | .333 | .000 | .333 | 1.3 | 0.4 | 0.1 | 0.1 | 1.3 |
| Brandon Porter | 24 | 3 | 6.8 | .433 | .333 | .714 | 0.8 | 0.1 | 0.3 | 0.2 | 3.1 |
| T.J. Taylor | 33 | 19 | 24.9 | .485 | .375 | .767 | 3.4 | 0.6 | 0.4 | 0.2 | 7.0 |
| Hunter Thompson | 26 | 23 | 26.4 | .400 | .330 | .717 | 4.1 | 0.9 | 0.2 | 0.5 | 8.2 |
| Javier Turner | 4 | 0 | 2.5 | .000 | .000 | .000 | 0.5 | 0.0 | 0.0 | 0.0 | 0.0 |

== Schedule and results ==
| Date time, TV | Rank^{#} | Opponent^{#} | Result | Record | Site (attendance) city, state |
Exhibition
| Oct 30, 2019*; 7:00 p.m., MWN | | Northwest Nazarene | W 62–56 | 0–0 | Arena-Auditorium (3,006); Laramie, WY |
Regular season
| Nov 5, 2019*; 7:00 p.m., MWN | | Idaho State | W 54–40 | 1–0 | Arena-Auditorium (3,010); Laramie, WY |
| Nov 10, 2019*; 10:00 a.m. | | at South Carolina | L 32–66 | 1–1 | Colonial Life Arena (10,255); Columbia, SC |
| Nov 13, 2019*; 7:00 p.m., MWN | | Cal State Fullerton | L 53–60 | 1–2 | Arena-Auditorium (3,003); Laramie, WY |
| Nov 16, 2019*; 7:00 p.m., Stadium | | Oregon State | L 63–83 | 1–3 | Arena-Auditorium (4.339); Laramie, WY |
| Nov 19, 2019*; 7:00 p.m., MWN | | Detroit Mercy; MGM Resorts Main Event Campus Site Game | W 76–49 | 2–3 | Arena-Auditorium (2,967); Laramie, WY |
| Nov 21, 2019*; 7:00 p.m., MWN | | Louisiana; MGM Resorts Main Event Campus Site Game | W 69–61 ^{OT} | 3–3 | Arena-Auditorium (2,860); Laramie, WY |
| Nov 24, 2019*; 6:00 p.m., ESPN3 | | vs. No. 23 Colorado; MGM Resorts Main Event Semifinal | L 41–56 | 3–4 | T-Mobile Arena; Paradise, NV |
| Nov 26, 2019*; 7:00 p.m., FloSports | | vs. TCU; MGM Resorts Main Event 3rd Place | L 47–64 | 3–5 | T-Mobile Arena; Paradise, NV |
| Dec 4, 2019; 7:00 p.m., MWN | | Air Force | L 77–86 | 3–6 (0–1) | Arena-Auditorium (3,013); Laramie, WY |
| Dec 7, 2019; 2:00 p.m., MWN | | New Mexico | L 65–79 | 3–7 (0–2) | Arena Auditorium (3,659); Laramie, WY |
| Dec 14, 2019*; 7:00 p.m., MWN | | Northern Colorado | L 53–74 | 3–8 | Arena-Auditorium (3,083); Laramie, WY |
| Dec 18, 2019*; 7:00 p.m., MWN | | Utah Valley | L 67–69 | 3–9 | Arena-Auditorium (2,716); Laramie, WY |
| Dec 21, 2019*; 1:00 p.m. | | at Denver | W 72–66 ^{OT} | 4–9 | Magness Arena (1,543); Denver, CO |
| Dec 28, 2019*; 4:00 p.m., MWN | | Nebraska Wesleyan | W 82–68 | 5–9 | Arena-Auditorium (2,826); Laramie, WY |
| Jan 1, 2020; 6:00 p.m., MWN | | at Boise State | L 54–65 | 5–10 (0–3) | ExtraMile Arena (4,708); Boise, ID |
| Jan 4, 2020; 11:00 a.m., ATTSNRM | | at Colorado State; Border War | L 61–72 | 5–11 (0–4) | Moby Arena (3,534); Fort Collins, CO |
| Jan 8, 2020; 7:00 p.m., MWN | | No. 7 San Diego State | L 52–72 | 5–12 (0–5) | Arena-Auditorium (2,941); Laramie, WY |
| Jan 11, 2020; 5:00 p.m., ATTSNRM | | UNLV | L 69–78 ^{OT} | 5–13 (0–6) | Arena-Auditorium (3,000); Laramie, WY |
| Jan 14, 2020; 7:00 p.m., CBSSN | | at Nevada | L 67–68 | 5–14 (0–7) | Lawlor Events Center (8,047); Reno, NV |
| Jan 18, 2020; 4:00 p.m., MWN | | Fresno State | L 50–65 | 5–15 (0–8) | Arena-Auditorium (3,226); Laramie, WY |
| Jan 21, 2020; 9:00 p.m., CBSSN | | at No. 4 San Diego State | L 55–72 | 5–16 (0–9) | Viejas Arena (12,414); San Diego, CA |
| Jan 28, 2020; 9:00 p.m., ESPNU | | Utah State | L 45–68 | 5–17 (0–10) | Arena-Auditorium (3,115); Laramie, WY |
| Feb 1, 2020; 3:00 p.m., MWN | | at San Jose State | W 71–66 | 6–17 (1–10) | Provident Credit Union Event Center (1,427); San Jose, CA |
| Feb 4, 2020; 8:00 p.m., MWN | | Boise State | L 62–67 | 6–18 (1–11) | Arena-Auditorium (2,892); Laramie, WY |
| Feb 8, 2020; 4:00 p.m., Stadium | | at New Mexico | L 68–97 | 6–19 (1–12) | Dreamstyle Arena (10,732); Albuquerque, NM |
| Feb 15, 2020; 2:00 p.m., ATTSNRM | | Colorado State; Border War | L 70–77 | 6–20 (1–13) | Arena-Auditorium (4,135); Laramie, WY |
| Feb 19, 2020; 7:00 p.m., ESPN3 | | at Utah State | L 58–78 | 6–21 (1–14) | Smith Spectrum (9,452); Logan, UT |
| Feb 22, 2020; 2:00 p.m., ATTSNRM | | at Air Force | W 78–72 | 7–21 (2–14) | Clune Arena (1,529); Colorado Springs, CO |
| Feb 25, 2020; 7:00 p.m., ATTSNRM | | Nevada | L 68–73 | 7–22 (2–15) | Arena-Auditorium (3,007); Laramie, WY |
| Feb 29, 2020; 5:00 p.m., MWN | | at Fresno State | L 55–63 | 7–23 (2–16) | Save Mart Center (7,156); Fresno, CA |
Mountain West tournament
| Mar 4, 2020; 6:00 p.m., MWN | (11) | vs. (6) Colorado State; First round | W 80–74 | 8–23 | Thomas & Mack Center (5,198); Paradise, NV |
| Mar 5, 2020; 9:30 p.m., CBSSN | (11) | vs. (3) Nevada; Quarterfinals | W 74–71 | 9–23 | Thomas & Mack Center (7,723); Paradise, NV |
| Mar 6, 2020; 9:30 p.m., CBSSN | (11) | vs. (2) Utah State; Semifinals | L 82–89 | 9–24 | Thomas & Mack Center (9,630); Paradise, NV |
*Non-conference game. ^{#}Rankings from AP Poll. (#) Tournament seedings in parentheses. All times are in Mountain Time.
