= 2019–20 Colorado State Rams men's basketball team =

American college basketball season

2019–20 Colorado State Rams men's basketball
- Conference: Mountain West Conference
- Record: 20–12 (11–7 MW)
- Head coach: Niko Medved (2nd season)
- Assistant coaches: Dave Thorson; JR Blount; Ali Farokhmanesh
- Home arena: Moby Arena

2019–20 Mountain West Conference men's basketball standings
	Conf.				Overall
Team	W		L	PCT	W		L	PCT
No. 6 San Diego State	17	–	1	.944	30	–	2	.938
Utah State †	12	–	6	.667	26	–	8	.765
Nevada	12	–	6	.667	19	–	12	.613
UNLV	12	–	6	.667	17	–	15	.531
Boise State	11	–	7	.611	20	–	12	.625
Colorado State	11	–	7	.611	20	–	12	.625
New Mexico	7	–	11	.389	19	–	14	.576
Fresno State	7	–	11	.389	11	–	19	.367
Air Force	5	–	13	.278	12	–	20	.375
San Jose State	3	–	15	.167	7	–	24	.226
Wyoming	2	–	16	.111	9	–	24	.273
† Conference tournament winner Rankings from AP poll

The 2019–20 Colorado State Rams men's basketball team represented Colorado State University during the 2019–20 NCAA Division I men's basketball season. The team was coached by Niko Medved in his second season. The Rams played their home games at Moby Arena on CSU's main campus in Fort Collins, Colorado as members of the Mountain West Conference. They finished the season 20–12, 11–7 in Mountain West play to finish in a tie for fifth place. They lost in the first round of the Mountain West tournament to Wyoming.

== Previous season ==
The Rams finished the 2018–19 season 12–20, 7–11 in Mountain West play to finish in a three-way tie for seventh place. They lost in the first round of the Mountain West tournament to Boise State.

== Offseason ==
=== Departures ===
Name	Number	Pos.	Height	Weight	Year	Hometown	Reason for departure
Zo Tyson	1	F	6'9"	195	RS Junior	Fayetteville, NC	Transferred to IUPUI
Juan Sabino	12	G	5'11"	170	RS Junior	Fountain, CO	Walk-on; left the team for personal reasons
Lorenzo Jenkins	13	G	6'7"	210	RS Junior	Naples, FL	Graduate transferred to Grand Canyon
Robbie Berwick	14	G	6'4"	195	RS Senior	Atascadero, CA	Graduated
Anthony Masinton-Bonner	15	G	6'2"	170	RS Junior	Lawrence, KS	Graduate transferred to Missouri State
Deion James	20	F	6'8"	215	Senior	Tucson, AZ	Graduated
Logan Ryan	21	F	6'9"	215	Sophomore	Plymouth, MI	Transferred to Ferris State
J. D. Page	22	G	6'3"	166	RS Senior	Aurora, CO	Graduated
Jack Schoemann	33	F	6'7"	190	Freshman	Prairie Village, KS	Transferred to Cal State Bakersfield

=== Incoming transfers ===
Name	Number	Pos.	Height	Weight	Year	Hometown	Previous School
Teyvion Kirk	2	G	6'4"	185	Junior	Joliet, IL	Transferred from Ohio. Under NCAA transfer rules, Kirk will have to sit out for the 2019–20 season. Will have two years of remaining eligibility.
P. J. Byrd	5	G	6'1"	185	Sophomore	Houston, TX	Transferred from VCU. Under NCAA transfer rules, Byrd would have sat out the 2019–20 season, but was granted a waiver to play immediately.
Kyle Lukasiewicz	22	G	6'6"	200	Junior	Denver, CO	Junior college transferred from Northeastern Oklahoma A&M College.
Ignas Sargiūnas	43	G	6'5"	205	Sophomore	Kaunas, Lithuania	Transferred from Georgia. Under NCAA transfer rules, Sargiūnas will have to sit out for the 2019–20 season. Will have three years of remaining eligibility.

=== 2019 recruiting class ===
College recruiting information
Name	Hometown	School	Height	Weight	Commit date
Isaiah Stevens; PG	Allen, TX	Allen High School	5 ft 10 in (1.78 m)	170 lb (77 kg)	Aug 27, 2018
Isaiah Stevens; PG	Recruit ratings: Scout: Rivals: ESPN: (NR)				
David Roddy; SF	Minneapolis, MN	Breck School	6 ft 5 in (1.96 m)	250 lb (110 kg)	Nov 9, 2018
David Roddy; SF	Recruit ratings: Scout: Rivals: ESPN: (NR)				
Dischon Thomas; PF	Phoenix, AZ	Hillcrest Prep	6 ft 9 in (2.06 m)	190 lb (86 kg)	Feb 16, 2019
Dischon Thomas; PF	Recruit ratings: Scout: Rivals: ESPN: (NR)				
James Moors; PF	New Zealand	Westlake Boys High School	6 ft 9 in (2.06 m)	200 lb (91 kg)	Apr 26, 2018
James Moors; PF	Recruit ratings: Scout: Rivals: ESPN: (NR)				
John Tonje; SF	Omaha, NE	Omaha Central High School	6 ft 5 in (1.96 m)	195 lb (88 kg)	Apr 26, 2018
John Tonje; SF	Recruit ratings: Scout: Rivals: ESPN: (NR)				
Overall recruit ranking: Scout: – Rivals: –
Note: In many cases, Scout, Rivals, 247Sports, On3, and ESPN may conflict in their listings of height and weight.; In these cases, the average was taken. ESPN grades are on a 100-point scale.; Sources: "Colorado State Commit List for 2019". Rivals.; "Men's Basketball Recruiting". Scout.; "ESPN – Colorado State Rams Basketball Recruiting 2019". ESPN.; "Scout.com Team Recruiting Rankings". Scout.; "2019 Team Ranking". Rivals.

=== 2020 recruiting class ===
College recruiting information (2020)
Name	Hometown	School	Height	Weight	Commit date
Isaiah Rivera; SF	Geneseo, IL	Geneseo High School	6 ft 4 in (1.93 m)	190 lb (86 kg)	Sep 9, 2019
Isaiah Rivera; SF	Recruit ratings: Scout: Rivals: ESPN: (79)				
Overall recruit ranking: Scout: – Rivals: –
Note: In many cases, Scout, Rivals, 247Sports, On3, and ESPN may conflict in their listings of height and weight.; In these cases, the average was taken. ESPN grades are on a 100-point scale.; Sources: "Colorado State Commit List for 2020". Rivals.; "Men's Basketball Recruiting". Scout.; "ESPN – Colorado State Rams Basketball Recruiting 2020". ESPN.; "Scout.com Team Recruiting Rankings". Scout.; "2020 Team Ranking". Rivals.

== Roster ==
2019–20 Colorado State Rams men's basketball team
Players
Coaches

Pos.	#	Name	Height	Weight	Year	Previous school	Hometown
G	0	Hyron Edwards	6 ft 0 in (1.83 m)	165 lb (75 kg)	RS Sr	East Chicago Central HS; Texas Tech	East Chicago, IN
G	1	Kris Martin	6 ft 4 in (1.93 m)	190 lb (86 kg)	RS Sr	Kimball HS; Oral Roberts	Frisco, TX
G	2	Teyvion Kirk (redshirt)	6 ft 4 in (1.93 m)	185 lb (84 kg)	RS Jr	Joliet West HS; Ohio	Joliet, IL
G	3	Kendle Moore	5 ft 10 in (1.78 m)	145 lb (66 kg)	So	Danville HS	Danville, IL
G	4	Isaiah Stevens	6 ft 0 in (1.83 m)	160 lb (73 kg)	Fr	Allen HS	Allen, TX
G	5	P. J. Byrd	6 ft 1 in (1.85 m)	185 lb (84 kg)	So	Bush HS; VCU	Houston, TX
F	10	James Moors	6 ft 10 in (2.08 m)	200 lb (91 kg)	Fr	Westlake Boys HS	Auckland, New Zealand
F	11	Dischon Thomas	6 ft 9 in (2.06 m)	215 lb (98 kg)	Fr	Hillcrest Prep	Phoenix, AZ
G/F	21	David Roddy	6 ft 5 in (1.96 m)	250 lb (113 kg)	Fr	Breck School	Minneapolis, MN
G	22	Kyle Lukasiewicz	6 ft 6 in (1.98 m)	200 lb (91 kg)	Jr	Arapahoe HS; Northeastern Oklahoma A&M	Centennial, CO
G	23	John Tonje	6 ft 5 in (1.96 m)	195 lb (88 kg)	Fr	Omaha Central HS	Omaha, NE
F	31	Adam Thistlewood	6 ft 6 in (1.98 m)	200 lb (91 kg)	So	Golden HS	Golden, CO
C	32	Nico Carvacho	6 ft 11 in (2.11 m)	245 lb (111 kg)	RS Sr	Sunrise Christian Academy	Frisco, TX
G	43	Ignas Sargiūnas (redshirt)	6 ft 5 in (1.96 m)	205 lb (93 kg)	So	Jonas Basanavičius Gymnasium; Georgia	Kaunas, Lithuania

Head coach

- Niko Medved (Minnesota)

Assistant coach(es)

- Dave Thorson (Hamline)
- JR Blount (Loyola Chicago)
- Ali Farokhmanesh (Northern Iowa)

Legend

- (C) Team captain
- (S) Suspended
- (I) Ineligible
- (W) Walk-on
- Injured
- Current redshirt

Roster

== Schedule and results ==
Date time, TV	Rank^{#}	Opponent^{#}	Result	Record	Site (attendance) city, state
Exhibition
November 1, 2019*; 7:00 pm		Western Colorado	W 79–41	–	Moby Arena (2,213); Fort Collins, CO
Regular season
November 5, 2019*; 7:00 pm		Denver	W 74–63	1–0	Moby Arena (2,322); Fort Collins, CO
November 8, 2019*; 5:00 pm, ACCN		at No. 4 Duke	L 55–89	1–1	Cameron Indoor Stadium (9,314); Durham, NC
November 13, 2019*; 7:00 pm		Omaha	W 80–65	2–1	Moby Arena (2,280); Fort Collins, CO
November 16, 2019*; 8:00 pm		at Loyola Marymount	W 74–64	3–1	Gersten Pavilion (989); Los Angeles, CA
November 20, 2019*; 7:00 pm		Arkansas State	L 78–80	3–2	Moby Arena (2,306); Fort Collins, CO
November 25, 2019*; 9:00 am, FloSports		vs. New Mexico State; Cayman Islands Classic Quarterfinals	L 70–78 ^{OT}	3–3	John Gray Gymnasium (1,251); George Town, Cayman Islands
November 26, 2019*; 9:00 am, FloSports		vs. Loyola–Chicago; Cayman Islands Classic Consolation 2nd round	W 61–60	4–3	John Gray Gymnasium (1,291); George Town, Cayman Islands
November 27, 2019*; 11:30 am, FloSports		vs. Washington State; Cayman Islands Classic 5th place game	W 79–69	5–3	John Gray Gymnasium (1,023); George Town, Cayman Islands
December 1, 2019*; 2:30 pm		Utah Valley	W 92–61	6–3	Moby Arena (3,168); Fort Collins, CO
December 4, 2019; 7:00 pm, Stadium		San Diego State	L 57–79	6–4 (0–1)	Moby Arena (3,419); Fort Collins, CO
December 7, 2019; 2:00 pm, ATTSNRM		at Boise State	L 64–75	6–5 (0–2)	ExtraMile Arena (3,577); Boise, ID
December 10, 2019*; 7:00 pm		South Dakota State	W 72–68	7–5	Moby Arena; Fort Collins, CO
December 13, 2019*; 6:00 pm, CBSSN		No. 24 Colorado	L 48–56	7–6	Moby Arena (6,629); Fort Collins, CO
December 21, 2019*; 12:30 pm, ESPN3		vs. Tulsa; BOK Center Basketball Showdown	W 111–104 ^{3OT}	8–6	BOK Center (2,422); Tulsa, OK
December 28, 2019*; 2:00 pm		Doane	W 87–62	9–6	Moby Arena (3,337); Fort Collins, CO
January 1, 2020; 8:00 pm, ATTSNRM		at Nevada	L 61–67	9–7 (0–3)	Lawlor Events Center (8,659); Reno, NV
January 4, 2020; 11:00 am, ATTSNRM		Wyoming; Border War	W 72–61	10–7 (1–3)	Moby Arena (3,534); Fort Collins, CO
January 11, 2020; 3:00 pm		at San Jose State	W 81–70	11–7 (2–3)	Provident Credit Union Event Center (1,363); San Jose, CA
January 15, 2020; 7:00 pm, ESPN3		at New Mexico	W 105–72	12–7 (3–3)	Dreamstyle Arena (2,502); Albuquerque, NM
January 18, 2020; 2:00 pm, ATTSNRM		at Air Force	W 78–65	13–7 (4–3)	Clune Arena (2,475); Colorado Springs, CO
January 22, 2020; 7:00 pm, ESPN3		Fresno State	W 86–68	14–7 (5–3)	Moby Arena (2,931); Fort Collins, CO
January 25, 2020; 8:00 pm, ESPNU		at Utah State	L 61–77	14–8 (5–4)	Smith Spectrum (9,791); Logan, UT
January 29, 2020; 7:00 pm, ESPN3		Nevada	W 92–91	15–8 (6–4)	Moby Arena (3,137); Fort Collins, CO
February 1, 2020; 2:00 pm, ESPN3		UNLV	W 95–77	16–8 (7–4)	Moby Arena (5,057); Fort Collins, CO
February 4, 2020; 7:00 pm, CBSSN		at Fresno State	W 80–70	17–8 (8–4)	Save Mart Center (5,842); Fresno, CA
February 11, 2020; 7:30 pm, CBSSN		Utah State	L 72–75	17–9 (8–5)	Moby Arena (4,038); Fort Collins, CO
February 15, 2020; 2:00 pm, ATTSNRM		at Wyoming; Border War	W 77–70	18–9 (9–5)	Arena-Auditorium (4,135); Laramie, WY
February 18, 2020; 8:30 pm, CBSSN		at UNLV	L 56–80	18–10 (9–6)	Thomas & Mack Center (7,509); Paradise, NV
February 22, 2020; 2:00 pm		San Jose State	W 78–71	19–10 (10–6)	Moby Arena (4,588); Fort Collins, CO
February 25, 2020; 9:00 pm, CBSSN		at No. 5 San Diego State	L 60–66	19–11 (10–7)	Viejas Arena (12,414); San Diego, CA
February 29, 2020; 2:00 pm, ESPN3		Air Force	W 87–74	20–11 (11–7)	Moby Arena (4,862); Fort Collins, CO
Mountain West tournament
March 4, 2020; 6:00 pm, Stadium	(6)	vs. (11) Wyoming; First round	L 74–80	20–12	Thomas & Mack Center (5,198); Paradise, NV
*Non-conference game. ^{#}Rankings from AP Poll. (#) Tournament seedings in parentheses. All times are in Mountain Time.
