= 2019–20 UNLV Runnin' Rebels basketball team =

American college basketball season

2019–20 UNLV Runnin' Rebels basketball
- Conference: Mountain West Conference
- Record: 17–15 (12–6 MW)
- Head coach: T. J. Otzelberger (1st season)
- Assistant coaches: Tim Buckley; Kevin Kruger; DeMarlo Slocum
- Home arena: Thomas & Mack Center

2019–20 Mountain West Conference men's basketball standings
	Conf.				Overall
Team	W		L	PCT	W		L	PCT
No. 6 San Diego State	17	–	1	.944	30	–	2	.938
Utah State †	12	–	6	.667	26	–	8	.765
Nevada	12	–	6	.667	19	–	12	.613
UNLV	12	–	6	.667	17	–	15	.531
Boise State	11	–	7	.611	20	–	12	.625
Colorado State	11	–	7	.611	20	–	12	.625
New Mexico	7	–	11	.389	19	–	14	.576
Fresno State	7	–	11	.389	11	–	19	.367
Air Force	5	–	13	.278	12	–	20	.375
San Jose State	3	–	15	.167	7	–	24	.226
Wyoming	2	–	16	.111	9	–	24	.273
† Conference tournament winner Rankings from AP poll

The 2019–20 UNLV Runnin' Rebels basketball team represented the University of Nevada, Las Vegas during the 2019–20 NCAA Division I men's basketball season. The Runnin' Rebels were led by first-year head coach T. J. Otzelberger and played their home games at the Thomas & Mack Center in Paradise, Nevada as members of the Mountain West Conference. They finished the season 17–15, 12–6 in Mountain West play to finish in a three-way tie for second place. They lost in the quarterfinals of the Mountain West tournament to Boise State.

== Previous season ==
The Runnin' Rebels finished the 2018–19 season 17–14, 11–7 in Mountain West play to finish in a tie for fourth place. They lost in the quarterfinals of the Mountain West tournament to San Diego State.

On March 15, head coach Marvin Menzies was fired. He finished at UNLV with a three-year record of 48–48.

On March 27, UNLV hired South Dakota State head coach T. J. Otzelberger as their next head coach.

== Offseason ==
=== Departures ===
Name	Number	Pos.	Height	Weight	Year	Hometown	Reason for departure
Kris Clyburn	1	G	6'6"	175	Senior	Romulus, MI	Graduated
Ben Coupet Jr.	2	G	6'7"	185	RS Sophomore	Chicago, IL	Transferred to Little Rock
Noah Robotham	5	G	6'1"	165	RS Senior	Las Vegas, NV	Graduated
Shakur Juiston	10	F	6'7"	220	Senior	Paterson, NJ	Graduated, transferred to Oregon
Djordjije Sljivancanin	12	F	6'10"	230	Junior	Belgrade, Serbia	Left the team for personal reasons
Tervell Beck	14	F	6'7"	230	Sophomore	Cleveland, OH	Transferred to Kent State
Trey Woodbury	22	G	6'4"	200	Freshman	Las Vegas, NV	Transferred to Utah Valley
Joel Ntambwe	24	F	6'9"	210	Freshman	Kinshasa, Congo	Transferred to Texas Tech
Jonathan Tchamwa Tchatchoua	30	F	6'8"	230	Freshman	Douala, Cameroon	Transferred to Baylor
Louis Bangai	43	C	6'10"	230	Freshman	Yaoundé, Cameroon	Walk-on; transferred to Grand Canyon

=== Incoming transfers ===
Name	Number	Pos.	Height	Weight	Year	Hometown	Previous School
Donnie Tillman	1	F	6'7"	225	Junior	Detroit, MI	Transferred from Utah. NCAA approved Donnie Tillman’s waiver to play for UNLV, Tillman will be able to play in the 2019–20 season. Will have two years of remaining eligibility.
Moses Wood	4	F	6'8"	190	Sophomore	Reno, NV	Transferred from Tulane. Under NCAA transfer rules, Wood will have to sit out for the 2019–20 season. Will have three years of remaining eligibility.
David Jenkins	5	G	6'2"	200	Junior	Tacoma, WA	Transferred from South Dakota State. Under NCAA transfer rules, Jenkins will have to sit out for the 2019–20 season. Will have two years of remaining eligibility.
Jonah Antonio	10	G	6'5"	180	Junior	Perth, Australia	Junior college transferred from South Plains College.
Trey Hurlburt	12	G	5'10"	160	RS Sophomore	Henderson, NV	Transferred from Cal State San Marcos. Will be eligible to play immediately. Join the team as a walk-on.
Vitaliy Shibel	22	F	6'9"	210	Grad Student	Ivano-Frankivsk, Ukraine	Transferred from Arizona State. Will be eligible to play immediately since Shibel graduated from Arizona State.
Taka Hall	24	G	6'3"	175	Grad Student	San Marcos, CA	Transferred from Johnson & Wales. Will be eligible to play immediately since Hall graduated from Johnson & Wales. Join the team as a walk-on.
Elijah Mitrou–Long	55	G	6'1"	185	Grad Student	Mississauga, Canada	Transferred from Texas. Will be eligible to play immediately since Mitrou–Long graduated from Texas.

=== 2019 recruiting class ===
No recruits.

=== 2020 recruiting class ===
College recruiting information (2020)
Name	Hometown	School	Height	Weight	Commit date
Nick Blake; SF	Bradenton, FL	IMG Academy	6 ft 5 in (1.96 m)	190 lb (86 kg)	Jun 14, 2019
Nick Blake; SF	Recruit ratings: Scout: Rivals: 247Sports: ESPN: (80)				
Jhaylon Martinez; C	Glendale, AZ	Dream City Christian	6 ft 10 in (2.08 m)	235 lb (107 kg)	Aug 10, 2019
Jhaylon Martinez; C	Recruit ratings: Scout: Rivals: 247Sports: ESPN: (80)				
Isaac Lindsey; SG	Mineral Point, WI	Mineral Point High School	6 ft 4 in (1.93 m)	N/A	Aug 10, 2019
Isaac Lindsey; SG	Recruit ratings: Scout: Rivals: 247Sports: ESPN: (NR)				
Donavan Yap; SG	Las Vegas, NV	Arbor View High School	6 ft 3 in (1.91 m)	155 lb (70 kg)	Jul 18, 2019
Donavan Yap; SG	Recruit ratings: Scout: Rivals: 247Sports: ESPN: (NR)				
Nick Fleming; PG	Atlanta, GA	Highland Community College	6 ft 0 in (1.83 m)	165 lb (75 kg)	
Nick Fleming; PG	Recruit ratings: Scout: Rivals: 247Sports: ESPN: (NR)				
Overall recruit ranking:
Note: In many cases, Scout, Rivals, 247Sports, On3, and ESPN may conflict in their listings of height and weight.; In these cases, the average was taken. ESPN grades are on a 100-point scale.; Sources: "2020 UNLV Basketball Commitments". Rivals.; "2020 Team Ranking". Rivals.

=== 2021 recruiting class ===
College recruiting information (2021)
Name	Hometown	School	Height	Weight	Commit date
Keshon Gilbert; PG	Las Vegas, NV	Durango High School	6 ft 1 in (1.85 m)	170 lb (77 kg)	Sep 7, 2019
Keshon Gilbert; PG	Recruit ratings: Scout: Rivals: 247Sports: ESPN: (NR)				
Overall recruit ranking:
Note: In many cases, Scout, Rivals, 247Sports, On3, and ESPN may conflict in their listings of height and weight.; In these cases, the average was taken. ESPN grades are on a 100-point scale.; Sources: "2021 UNLV Basketball Commitments". Rivals.; "2021 Team Ranking". Rivals.

== Roster ==
2019–20 UNLV Runnin' Rebels men's basketball team
Players
Coaches

Pos.	#	Name	Height	Weight	Year	Previous school	Hometown
G	0	Jay Green	6 ft 5 in (1.96 m)	200 lb (91 kg)	RS So	Hillcrest Prep	Sydney, Australia
F	1	Moses Wood (redshirt)	6 ft 8 in (2.03 m)	195 lb (88 kg)	So	Tulane	Reno, NV
F	2	Donnie Tillman	6 ft 7 in (2.01 m)	225 lb (102 kg)	Jr	Utah	Detroit, MI
G	3	Amauri Hardy	6 ft 2 in (1.88 m)	190 lb (86 kg)	Jr	North Farmington HS	Farmington Hills, MI
G	5	David Jenkins Jr. (redshirt)	6 ft 2 in (1.88 m)	195 lb (88 kg)	Jr	South Dakota State	Tacoma, WA
G	10	Jonah Antonio	6 ft 5 in (1.96 m)	195 lb (88 kg)	Jr	South Plains College	Perth, Australia
G	12	Trey Hurlburt (W)	5 ft 11 in (1.8 m)	170 lb (77 kg)	RS So	Cal State San Marcos	Las Vegas, NV
G	13	Bryce Hamilton	6 ft 4 in (1.93 m)	200 lb (91 kg)	So	Pasadena HS	Pasadena, CA
F	15	Cheickna Dembélé	6 ft 11 in (2.11 m)	245 lb (111 kg)	RS Jr	Scotland Performance Institute	Banamba, Mali
F	20	Nick Blair (W)	6 ft 5 in (1.96 m)	215 lb (98 kg)	RS Sr	Idaho	Las Vegas, NV
F	22	Vitaliy Shibel	6 ft 9 in (2.06 m)	210 lb (95 kg)	GS	Arizona State	Ivano-Frankivsk, Ukraine
G	24	Taka Hall (W)	6 ft 4 in (1.93 m)	175 lb (79 kg)	GS	Johnson & Wales	San Marcos, CA
G	31	Marvin Coleman (W)	6 ft 2 in (1.88 m)	190 lb (86 kg)	So	Foothill HS	Las Vegas, NV
F	34	Cheikh Mbacke Diong	6 ft 11 in (2.11 m)	220 lb (100 kg)	Jr	Florida Preparatory Academy	Dakar, Senegal
G	55	Elijah Mitrou-Long	6 ft 1 in (1.85 m)	195 lb (88 kg)	GS	Texas	Mississauga, Canada

Head coach

- T. J. Otzelberger (UW–Whitewater)

Assistant coach(es)

- Tim Buckley (Bemidji State)
- Kevin Kruger (UNLV)
- DeMarlo Slocum (Georgia Southern)

Legend

- (C) Team captain
- (S) Suspended
- (I) Ineligible
- (W) Walk-on
- Injured
- Current redshirt

Roster

== Schedule and results ==
Date time, TV	Rank^{#}	Opponent^{#}	Result	Record	Site (attendance) city, state
Exhibition
October 25, 2019*; 7:00 pm		West Coast Baptist	W 112–54	–	Thomas & Mack Center; Paradise, NV
Regular season
November 5, 2019*; 7:00 pm		Purdue Fort Wayne	W 86–71	1–0	Thomas & Mack Center (7,728); Paradise, NV
November 9, 2019*; 1:00 pm, ESPN3		Kansas State	L 56–60 ^{OT}	1–1	Thomas & Mack Center (8,796); Paradise, NV
November 12, 2019*; 8:00 pm, P12N		at California	L 75–79 ^{OT}	1–2	Haas Pavilion (3,423); Berkeley, CA
November 15, 2019*; 8:00 pm, P12N		at UCLA	L 54–71	1–3	Pauley Pavilion (6,601); Los Angeles, CA
November 18, 2019*; 7:00 pm		Abilene Christian; Southwestern Showdown	W 72–58	2–3	Thomas & Mack Center (6,906); Paradise, NV
November 20, 2019*; 7:00 pm		Texas State; Southwestern Showdown	L 57–64	2–4	Thomas & Mack Center (7,067); Paradise, NV
November 23, 2019*; 7:30 pm, Stadium		SMU; Southwestern Showdown	L 68–72	2–5	Thomas & Mack Center (7,803); Paradise, NV
November 26, 2019*; 7:00 pm		Jackson State; Southwestern Showdown	W 80–57	3–5	Thomas & Mack Center (7,164); Paradise, NV
November 30, 2019*; 4:00 pm, ESPN3		at Cincinnati	L 65–72 ^{OT}	3–6	Fifth Third Arena (10,783); Cincinnati, OH
December 4, 2019; 7:00 pm, ATTSNRM		at Fresno State	W 81–80 ^{2OT}	4–6 (1–0)	Save Mart Center (5,436); Fresno, CA
December 7, 2019*; 12:00 pm, BYUtv		vs. BYU	L 50–83	4–7	Vivint Smart Home Arena (11,356); Salt Lake City, UT
December 18, 2019*; 7:00 pm		Pacific	L 66–74	4–8	Thomas & Mack Center (7,023); Paradise, NV
December 21, 2019*; 12:00 pm		Robert Morris	W 96–81	5–8	Thomas & Mack Center (6,910); Paradise, NV
December 28, 2019*; 12:00 pm		Eastern Michigan	W 64–49	6–8	Thomas & Mack Center (7,463); Paradise, NV
January 1, 2020; 8:00 pm, CBSSN		Utah State	W 70–53	7–8 (2–0)	Thomas & Mack Center (7,571); Paradise, NV
January 4, 2020; 7:00 pm, ESPNU		Air Force	W 71–59	8–8 (3–0)	Thomas & Mack Center (7,633); Paradise, NV
January 8, 2020; 6:00 pm, ESPN3		at Boise State	L 66–73	8–9 (3–1)	ExtraMile Arena (4,509); Boise, ID
January 11, 2020; 4:00 pm, ATTSNRM		at Wyoming	W 78–69 ^{OT}	9–9 (4–1)	Arena-Auditorium (3,000); Laramie, WY
January 15, 2020; 8:00 pm, ATTSNRM		San Jose State	W 98–87	10–9 (5–1)	Thomas & Mack Center (7,338); Paradise, NV
January 18, 2020; 8:00 pm, CBSSN		New Mexico	W 99–78	11–9 (6–1)	Thomas & Mack Center (9,022); Paradise, NV
January 22, 2020; 8:00 pm, CBSSN		at Nevada	L 72–86	11–10 (6–2)	Lawlor Events Center (10,325); Reno, NV
January 26, 2020; 1:00 pm, CBSSN		No. 4 San Diego State	L 67–71	11–11 (6–3)	Thomas & Mack Center (12,287); Paradise, NV
February 1, 2020; 1:00 pm, ESPN3		at Colorado State	L 77–95	11–12 (6–4)	Moby Arena (5,057); Fort Collins, CO
February 5, 2020; 7:00 pm, CBSSN		at Utah State	L 54–69	11–13 (6–5)	Smith Spectrum (8,987); Logan, UT
February 8, 2020; 5:00 pm, ESPNU		Fresno State	W 68–67	12–13 (7–5)	Thomas & Mack Center (8,497); Paradise, NV
February 12, 2020; 7:00 pm, ESPN3		Nevada	L 79–82 ^{OT}	12–14 (7–6)	Thomas & Mack Center (11,607); Paradise, NV
February 15, 2020; 3:00 pm, CBSSN		at New Mexico	W 78–73	13–14 (8–6)	Dreamstyle Arena (11,794); Albuquerque, NM
February 18, 2020; 7:30 pm, CBSSN		Colorado State	W 80–56	14–14 (9–6)	Thomas & Mack Center (7,509); Paradise, NV
February 22, 2020; 1:00 pm, CBSSN		at No. 4 San Diego State	W 66–63	15–14 (10–6)	Viejas Arena (12,414); San Diego, CA
February 26, 2020; 8:00 pm, CBSSN		Boise State	W 76–66	16–14 (11–6)	Thomas & Mack Center (9,627); Paradise, NV
February 29, 2020; 2:00 pm, ATTSNRM		at San Jose State	W 92–69	17–14 (12–6)	Provident Credit Union Event Center (2,074); San Jose, CA
Mountain West tournament
March 5, 2020; 2:00 pm, CBSSN	(4)	(5) Boise State; Quarterfinals	L 61–67	17–15	Thomas & Mack Center (8,189); Paradise, NV
*Non-conference game. ^{#}Rankings from AP Poll. (#) Tournament seedings in parentheses. All times are in Pacific Time.
