= 2019–20 Boise State Broncos men's basketball team =

American college basketball season

2019–20 Boise State Broncos men's basketball
- Conference: Mountain West Conference
- Record: 20–12 (11–7 MW)
- Head coach: Leon Rice (10th season)
- Assistant coaches: Mike Burns; Tim Duryea; R-Jay Barsh
- Home arena: ExtraMile Arena

2019–20 Mountain West Conference men's basketball standings
	Conf.				Overall
Team	W		L	PCT	W		L	PCT
No. 6 San Diego State	17	–	1	.944	30	–	2	.938
Utah State †	12	–	6	.667	26	–	8	.765
Nevada	12	–	6	.667	19	–	12	.613
UNLV	12	–	6	.667	17	–	15	.531
Boise State	11	–	7	.611	20	–	12	.625
Colorado State	11	–	7	.611	20	–	12	.625
New Mexico	7	–	11	.389	19	–	14	.576
Fresno State	7	–	11	.389	11	–	19	.367
Air Force	5	–	13	.278	12	–	20	.375
San Jose State	3	–	15	.167	7	–	24	.226
Wyoming	2	–	16	.111	9	–	24	.273
† Conference tournament winner Rankings from AP poll

The 2019–20 Boise State Broncos men's basketball team represented Boise State University during the 2019–20 NCAA Division I men's basketball season. The Broncos, led by tenth-year head coach Leon Rice, played their home games at ExtraMile Arena as a member of the Mountain West Conference. They finished the season 20–12, 11–7 in Mountain West play to finish in a tie for fifth place. They defeated UNLV in the quarterfinals of the Mountain West tournament before losing in the semifinals to San Diego State.

== Previous season ==
The Broncos 13–20, 7–11 in Mountain West play to finish in a three-way tie for seventh place. They defeated Colorado State in the first round of the Mountain West tournament to advance to the quarterfinals where they lost to Nevada. This was the first time in Boise State history that they lost 20 games in a season.

== Offseason ==
=== Departures ===
Name	Number	Pos.	Height	Weight	Year	Hometown	Reason for departure
Jaycson Bereal	2	G	6'6"	188	Freshman	Tulsa, OK	Transferred to Odessa College
Malek Harwell	5	G	6'5"	188	RS Junior	Pocatello, ID	Graduate transferred to Cal Poly
Zach Haney	11	F	6'11"	239	RS Senior	Humble, TX	Graduated
Pat Dembley	13	G	6'1"	174	Junior	Minneapolis, MN	Transferred to UT Permian Basin
David Wacker	33	F	6'10"	236	RS Senior	Converse, TX	Graduated
Mikey Frazier	45	F	6'10"	244	Freshman	Salt Lake City, UT	Transferred to Garden City CC

=== Incoming transfers ===
Name	Number	Pos.	Height	Weight	Year	Hometown	Previous college
Marcus Shaver Jr.	1	G	6'2"	185	Junior	Phoenix, AZ	Transferred from Portland. Under NCAA transfer rules, Shaver Jr. will have to sit out for the 2019–20 season. Will have two years of remaining eligibility.
Devonaire Doutrive	5	G	6'5"	185	Sophomore	Dallas, TX	Transferred from Arizona. Under NCAA transfer rules, Doutrive will have to sit out for the 2019–20 season. Will have three years of remaining eligibility.
Emmanuel Akot	14	G	6'7"	200	Junior	Winnipeg, MB	Transferred from Arizona. Under NCAA transfer rules, Akot will have to sit out for the 2019–20 season. Will have two years of remaining eligibility.
Chase Berry	22	G	6'6"	220	Junior	Lehi, UT	Junior college transferred form Utah State University Eastern. Will join the team as a walk-on.
Abu Kigab	24	F	6'6"	215	Junior	St. Catharines, ON	Transferred from Oregon in January during the 2018–19 season. Under NCAA transfer rules, Kigab has to sit out until January and will be eligible to start in January during the 2019–20 season. Kigab has one and a half years of remaining eligibility.
Mladen Armus	33	F	6'10"	240	Junior	Belgrade, Serbia	Transferred from East Tennessee State. Under NCAA transfer rules, Armus will have to sit out for the 2019–20 season. Will have two years of remaining eligibility.

=== 2019 recruiting class ===
College recruiting information
Name	Hometown	School	Height	Weight	Commit date
RayJ Dennis; PG	Oswego, IL	Oswego East High School	6 ft 2 in (1.88 m)	165 lb (75 kg)	Sep 4, 2018
RayJ Dennis; PG	Recruit ratings: Scout: Rivals: (NR)				
Overall recruit ranking: Scout: – Rivals: –
Note: In many cases, Scout, Rivals, 247Sports, On3, and ESPN may conflict in their listings of height and weight.; In these cases, the average was taken. ESPN grades are on a 100-point scale.; Sources: "2019 Team Ranking". Rivals.

=== 2020 recruiting class ===
College recruiting information (2020)
Name	Hometown	School	Height	Weight	Commit date
Burke Smith; PF	Richmond, VA	Trinity Episcopal School	6 ft 11 in (2.11 m)	215 lb (98 kg)	Sep 9, 2019
Burke Smith; PF	Recruit ratings: Scout: Rivals: (NR)				
Kasean Pryor; SF	Ann Arbor, MI	Link Year Prep	6 ft 8 in (2.03 m)	215 lb (98 kg)	
Kasean Pryor; SF	Recruit ratings: Scout: Rivals: (NR)				
Overall recruit ranking: Scout: – Rivals: –
Note: In many cases, Scout, Rivals, 247Sports, On3, and ESPN may conflict in their listings of height and weight.; In these cases, the average was taken. ESPN grades are on a 100-point scale.; Sources: "2020 Team Ranking". Rivals.

== Roster ==
2019–20 Boise State Broncos men's basketball team
Players
Coaches

Pos.	#	Name	Height	Weight	Year	Previous school	Hometown
G	0	Marcus Dickinson	6 ft 1 in (1.85 m)	183 lb (83 kg)	Sr	Norman North HS	Norman, OK
G	1	Marcus Shaver Jr. (redshirt)	6 ft 2 in (1.88 m)	185 lb (84 kg)	Jr	Shadow Mountain HS; Portland	Phoenix, AZ
G	3	Justinian Jessup	6 ft 7 in (2.01 m)	202 lb (92 kg)	Sr	Longmont HS	Longmont, CO
G	4	Bing Huang (W)	6 ft 5 in (1.96 m)	175 lb (79 kg)	RS Fr	Brewster Academy	Westlake Village, CA
G	5	Devonaire Doutrive (redshirt)	6 ft 5 in (1.96 m)	185 lb (84 kg)	So	Birmingham HS; Arizona	Dallas, Texas
G	10	RayJ Dennis	6 ft 2 in (1.88 m)	177 lb (80 kg)	Fr	Oswego East HS	Oswego, IL
F	11	Riley Abercrombie	6 ft 9 in (2.06 m)	210 lb (95 kg)	RS Fr	Clear Lake HS	Wollongong, Australia
G	12	Max Rice (W)	6 ft 5 in (1.96 m)	189 lb (86 kg)	RS Fr	Bishop Kelly HS	Boise, ID
G	14	Emmanuel Akot (redshirt)	6 ft 8 in (2.03 m)	203 lb (92 kg)	Jr	Wasatch Academy; Arizona	Winnipeg, MB
G	21	Derrick Alston Jr.	6 ft 8 in (2.03 m)	188 lb (85 kg)	RS Jr	Strake Jesuit HS	Houston, TX
G	22	Chase Berry (W)	6 ft 6 in (1.98 m)	220 lb (100 kg)	Jr	Skyridge HS; Utah State Eastern	Lehi, UT
G	23	RJ Williams	6 ft 7 in (2.01 m)	215 lb (98 kg)	Sr	Price HS; East Los Angeles College	Los Angeles, CA
F	24	Abu Kigab	6 ft 6 in (1.98 m)	211 lb (96 kg)	Jr	Prolific Prep; Oregon	St. Catharines, Ontario
F	25	Robin Jorch	6 ft 11 in (2.11 m)	245 lb (111 kg)	RS Sr	International Berlin Basketball Academy	Berlin, Germany
F	33	Mladen Armus (redshirt)	6 ft 10 in (2.08 m)	230 lb (104 kg)	Jr	Southwest Christian Academy; East Tennessee State	Belgrade, Serbia
G	34	Alex Hobbs	6 ft 4 in (1.93 m)	188 lb (85 kg)	Sr	La Porte HS	La Porte, TX

Head coach

- Leon Rice (Washington State)

Assistant coach(es)

- Mike Burns (Central Washington)
- Tim Duryea (North Texas)
- R-Jay Barsh (Puget Sound)

Legend

- (C) Team captain
- (S) Suspended
- (I) Ineligible
- (W) Walk-on
- Injured
- Current redshirt

Roster

== Schedule and results ==
Date time, TV	Rank^{#}	Opponent^{#}	Result	Record	Site (attendance) city, state
Exhibition
Oct 31, 2019*; 7:00 pm		West Coast Baptist	W 95–34		ExtraMile Arena (2,294); Boise, ID
Regular season
Nov 5, 2019*; 7:00 pm		Life Pacific	W 126–49	1–0	ExtraMile Arena (2,864); Boise, ID
Nov 9, 2019; 9:00 pm, P12N		at Oregon	L 75–106	1–1	Matthew Knight Arena (7,260); Eugene, OR
Nov 15, 2019*; 5:30 pm, MWN		UC Irvine	L 60-69	1–2	ExtraMile Arena; Boise, ID
Nov 20, 2019*; 8:00 pm, CBSSN		BYU	W 72–68 ^{OT}	2–2	ExtraMile Arena (6,143); Boise, ID
Nov 23, 2019; 5:00 pm		at Pacific	W 82–76 ^{3OT}	3–2	Alex G. Spanos Center (1,859); Stockton, CA
Nov 29, 2019*; 7:00 pm, MWN		UNC Wilmington	W 80–59	4–2	ExtraMile Arena (3,964); Boise, ID
Dec 4, 2019; 7:00 pm, Stadium		at New Mexico	L 78–80	4–3 (0–1)	Dreamstyle Arena (10,301); Albuquerque, NM
Dec 7, 2019; 7:00 pm, ATTSNRM		Colorado State	W 75–64	5–3 (1–1)	ExtraMile Arena (3,577); Boise, ID
Dec 11, 2019*; 6:00 pm, ESPN3		at Tulsa	L 56–69	5–4	Reynolds Center (3,367); Tulsa, OK
Dec 14, 2019*; 4:00 pm		Alabama State	W 100–57	6–4	ExtraMile Arena (3,478); Boise, ID
Dec 22, 2019*; 3:00 pm, ESPNU		vs. Georgia Tech; 2019 Diamond Head Classic quarterfinals	L 60–74	6–5	Stan Sheriff Center; Honolulu, HI
Dec 23, 2019*; 2:30 pm, ESPNU		vs. Portland; Diamond Head Classic 2nd round	W 85–69	7–5	Stan Sheriff Center; Honolulu, HI
Dec 25, 2019*; 1:30 pm, ESPNU		vs. UTEP; 2019 Diamond Head Classic 5th place game	W 62–50	8–5	Stan Sheriff Center; Honolulu, HI
Dec 28, 2019*; 4:00 pm		vs. Cal State Northridge	W 103–72	9–5	ExtraMile Arena (4,121); Boise, ID
Jan 1, 2020; 6:00 pm, MWN		Wyoming	W 65–54	10–5 (2–1)	ExtraMile Arena (4,708); Boise, ID
Jan 4, 2020; 4:00 pm, CBSSN		at Nevada	L 66–83	10–6 (2–2)	Lawlor Events Center (8,681); Reno, NV
Jan 8, 2020; 1:00 pm, ESPN3		UNLV	W 73–66	11–6 (3–2)	ExtraMile Arena (4,509); Boise, ID
Jan 11, 2020; 8:00 pm, ESPN3		at No. 7 San Diego State	L 65–83	12–6 (3–3)	Viejas Arena (12,414); San Diego, CA
Jan 15, 2020; 7:00 pm, ATTSNRM		at Air Force	L 78–85	12–7 (3–4)	Clune Arena (1,758); Colorado Springs, CO
Jan 18, 2020; 8:00 pm, ESPNU		Utah State	W 88–83 ^{OT}	13–7 (4–4)	ExtraMile Arena (6,047); Boise, ID
Jan 25, 2020; 2:00 pm, ATTSNRM		at Fresno State	W 87–53	14–7 (5–4)	Save Mart Center (6,342); Fresno, CA
Jan 29, 2020; 7:00 pm		San Jose State	W 99–71	14–8 (6–4)	ExtraMile Arena (4,724); Boise, ID
Feb 1, 2020; 8:00 pm, ESPNU		Nevada	W 73–64	15–8 (7–4)	ExtraMile Arena (6,538); Boise, ID
Feb 4, 2020; 8:00 pm, MWN		at Wyoming	W 67–62	16–8 (8–4)	Arena Auditorium (2,892); Laramie, WY
Feb 8, 2020; 8:00 pm, CBSSN		at Utah State	L 61–70	16–9 (8–5)	Dee Glen Smith Spectrum (10,033); Logan, UT
Feb 11, 2020; 7:00 pm, ATTSNRM		Air Force	W 74–57	17–9 (9–5)	ExtraMile Arena (4,898); Boise, ID
Feb 16, 2020; 2:00 pm, CBSSN		No. 4 San Diego State	L 55–72	17–10 (9–6)	ExtraMile Arena (10,651); Boise, ID
Feb 19, 2020; 8:00 pm, Stadium		at San Jose State	W 80–62	18–10 (10–6)	Provident Credit Union Event Center (1,339); San Jose, CA
Feb 23, 2020; 2:00 pm, CBSSN		New Mexico	W 74–61	19–10 (11–6)	ExtraMile Arena (5,809); Boise, ID
Feb 26, 2020; 9:00 pm, CBSSN		at UNLV	L 66–76	19–11 (11–7)	Thomas & Mack Center (9,627); Paradise, NV
Mountain West tournament
Mar 5, 2020; 3:00 pm, Stadium	(5)	vs. (4) UNLV; Quarterfinal	W 67–61	20–11	Thomas & Mack Center (8,189); Paradise, NV
Mar 6, 2020; 7:00 pm, CBSSN	(5)	vs. (1) No. 5 San Diego State; Semifinals	L 68–81	20–12	Thomas & Mack Center; Paradise, NV
*Non-conference game. ^{#}Rankings from AP Poll. (#) Tournament seedings in parentheses. All times are in Mountain Time Source.
