= Elijah Mitrou-Long =

Canadian basketball player (born 1996)

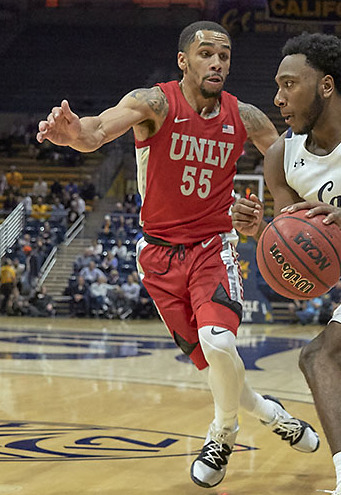
- Mitrou-Long with UNLV in 2019

No. 0 – Aris Thessaloniki
- Position: Shooting guard / point guard
- League: Greek Basketball League; EuroCup

Personal information
- Born: December 15, 1996 (age 29) Mississauga, Ontario, Canada
- Listed height: 6 ft 2 in (1.88 m)
- Listed weight: 185 lb (84 kg)

Career information
- High school: The John Carroll School (Bel Air, Maryland)
- College: Mount St. Mary's (2015–2017); Texas (2018–2019); UNLV (2019–2020)
- NBA draft: 2020: undrafted
- Playing career: 2020–present

Career history
- 2020–2021: PAOK Thessaloniki
- 2021–2022: Levski Sofia
- 2022: Apollon Patras
- 2022: Niagara River Lions
- 2022–2023: Aris Thessaloniki
- 2023–2024: Peristeri
- 2024: Brampton Honey Badgers
- 2024–2025: Hapoel Holon
- 2025: Varese
- 2025–present: Aris Thessaloniki

Career highlights
- NIT champion (2019); First-team All-NEC (2017); NEC tournament MVP (2017)

Elijah Isa Mitrou-Long (born December 15, 1996) is a Canadian–Greek professional basketball player for Aris Thessaloniki of the Greek Basketball League (GBL) and the EuroCup. He played college basketball for Mount St. Mary's, Texas, and UNLV.

== Early life ==
Mitrou-Long grew up in Mississauga, Ontario. He played football and hockey but focused his attention on basketball. At the age of 15, he enrolled at The John Carroll School in Bel Air, Maryland, and lived with a host family. As a junior, he averaged 10 points, four rebounds and four assists per game. Mitrou-Long averaged 10.2 points, 4.2 rebounds, 3.3 assists and 1.5 steals per game as a senior. He competed for CIA Bounce in AAU play.

== College career ==
Mitrou-Long began his college career at Mount St. Mary's. He averaged 5.6 points, 2.5 rebounds and 2.2 assists per game as a freshman. Mitrou-Long scored a career-high 29 points including a late go-ahead layup on February 18, 2017, in a 79–74 win against Fairleigh Dickinson. As a sophomore, he averaged 15.0 points, 5.2 rebounds, 4.4 assists and 1.6 steals per game, earning First Team All-NEC honors. Mitrou-Long helped lead the team to a NEC regular-season and tournament championships, scoring 22 points in the tournament title game against St. Francis (PA) and earned NEC Tournament MVP honors. He transferred to Texas after the season, the only school he visited, and redshirted the 2017–18 season per NCAA regulations.

As a redshirt junior, Mitrou-Long started nine games averaging 5.6 points, 2.2 rebounds and 1.6 assists per game for a team that finished 21–16 and won the NIT. Following the season, he transferred to UNLV where he was eligible immediately as a graduate transfer. Mitrou-Long joined former Mount St. Mary's teammate Jonah Antonio at UNLV, who told him that coach T. J. Otzelberger was very honest and straightforward. On November 30, 2019, Mitrou-Long tied his career-high with 29 points in a 72–65 overtime loss to Cincinnati. Mitrou-Long missed 12 games in December 2019 and January 2020 with a broken thumb, and his season ended after sustaining a knee injury during a February 29 win against San Jose State. As a senior, Mitrou-Long averaged 12.6 points, 3.3 rebounds, 3.4 assists, and 1.7 steals per game.

== Professional career ==
=== PAOK Thessaloniki (2020–2021) ===
On July 29, 2020, Mitrou-Long signed his first professional contract with PAOK Thessaloniki of the Greek Basket League. In 13 games, he averaged 4.2 points, 1.5 rebounds and 1.2 assists, playing 14.4 minutes per contest. Subsequently, he suffered a season-ending right knee injury. On August 18, 2021, he officially parted ways with the Greek club.

=== Levski Sofia (2021–2022) ===
On October 25, 2021, Mitrou-Long signed a one-year deal with Levski Sofia of the National Basketball League. Playing for the Bulgarian club, he averaged 14 points, 3.5 rebounds and 5.6 assists per game.

=== Apollon Patras (2022) ===
On January 9, 2022, Mitrou-Long agreed to terms with Apollon Patras, returning to the Greek Basket League. In 13 games, he averaged 10.8 points, 3.4 rebounds, 3 assists and 1 steal, playing around 25 minutes per contest.

=== Yalovaspor (2022) ===
On August 8, 2022, Mitrou-Long signed with Semt77 Yalovaspor of the Turkish Basketball First League (TBL), but he never appeared in a single game for them.

=== Aris Thessaloniki (2022–2023) ===
On November 5, 2022, Mitrou-Long returned to Greece for Aris Thessaloniki, replacing the injured Josh Hagins. In 19 domestic league games, he averaged 10 points, 3.4 rebounds, 3 assists and 1.1 steals in 24 minutes per contest.

=== Peristeri (2023–2024) ===
On June 16, 2023, Mitrou-Long signed with Peristeri.

=== Hapoel Holon (2024–2025) ===
On July 20, 2024, Mitrou-Long signed with Hapoel Holon of the Israeli Basketball Premier League.

=== Varese (2025) ===
On February 18, 2025, he was acquired by Pallacanestro Varese of the Lega Basket Serie A.

=== Return to Aris Thessaloniki (2025–present) ===
On August 11, 2025, Mitrou-Long return to Aris Thessaloniki on a contract until.

== National team career ==
Mitrou-Long is a member of the senior men's Greece national team.

== Career statistics ==
Legend
GP	Games played	GS	Games started	MPG	Minutes per game
FG%	Field goal percentage	3P%	3-point field goal percentage	FT%	Free throw percentage
RPG	Rebounds per game	APG	Assists per game	SPG	Steals per game
BPG	Blocks per game	PPG	Points per game	**Bold**	Career high

=== College ===
Year	Team	GP	GS	MPG	FG%	3P%	FT%	RPG	APG	SPG	BPG	PPG
2015–16	Mount St. Mary's	30	22	22.9	.341	.333	.625	2.5	2.2	1.1	.1	5.6
2016–17	Mount St. Mary's	**36**	**35**	**34.4**	.412	**.382**	.739	**5.2**	**4.4**	1.6	.1	**15.0**
2017–18	Texas	Redshirt										
2018–19	Texas	**36**	9	17.9	.338	.320	.614	2.2	1.6	.8	.1	5.6
2019–20	UNLV	19	10	31.5	**.461**	.345	**.745**	3.3	3.4	**1.7**	**.3**	12.6
Career		121	76	26.2	.393	.350	.705	3.3	2.8	1.3	.1	9.5

== Personal life ==
Mitrou-Long is the son of Jersey Long and Georgia Mitrou. His father is of Trinidadian descent while his mother is a Greek Canadian. On 10 October 2023, Mitrou-Long obtained a Greek passport.

Mitrou-Long has three siblings and six half-siblings. His brother, Naz Mitrou-Long, played college basketball for Iowa State and later in the NBA for the Indiana Pacers. One of his favorite players is former UNLV forward Anthony Bennett, who mentored Mitrou-Long growing up.
