= 2019–20 San Jose State Spartans men's basketball team =

American college basketball season

2019–20 San Jose State Spartans men's basketball
- Conference: Mountain West Conference
- Record: 7–24 (3–15 MW)
- Head coach: Jean Prioleau (3rd season)
- Assistant coaches: Will Kimble; Julius Hodge; Tim Marrion
- Home arena: Provident Credit Union Event Center (Capacity: 5,000)

2019–20 Mountain West Conference men's basketball standings
	Conf.				Overall
Team	W		L	PCT	W		L	PCT
No. 6 San Diego State	17	–	1	.944	30	–	2	.938
Utah State †	12	–	6	.667	26	–	8	.765
Nevada	12	–	6	.667	19	–	12	.613
UNLV	12	–	6	.667	17	–	15	.531
Boise State	11	–	7	.611	20	–	12	.625
Colorado State	11	–	7	.611	20	–	12	.625
New Mexico	7	–	11	.389	19	–	14	.576
Fresno State	7	–	11	.389	11	–	19	.367
Air Force	5	–	13	.278	12	–	20	.375
San Jose State	3	–	15	.167	7	–	24	.226
Wyoming	2	–	16	.111	9	–	24	.273
† Conference tournament winner Rankings from AP poll

The 2019–20 San Jose State Spartans men's basketball team represented San Jose State University in the 2019–20 NCAA Division I men's basketball season. Led by third-year head coach Jean Prioleau, they played their home games at the newly-renamed Provident Credit Union Event Center in San Jose, California as members of the Mountain West Conference. They finished the season 7–24, 3–15 in Mountain West play to finish in tenth place. They lost in the first round of the Mountain West tournament to New Mexico.

== Previous season ==
The Spartans finished the season 4–27, 1–17 in Mountain West play to finish in last place. They lost in the first round of the Mountain West tournament to Air Force.

== Off-season ==
=== Departures ===
Name	Number	Pos.	Height	Weight	Year	Hometown	Reason for departure
Michael Steadman	1	F	6'10"	210	Junior	Union City, CA	Transferred to Montana
Oumar Barry	13	C	6'11"	230	Senior	Conakry, Guinea	Graduated
Noah Baumann	20	G/F	6'5"	180	Sophomore	Phoenix, AZ	Transferred to USC
Brian Rodriguez-Flores	34	G	6'4"	180	Junior	Phoenix, AZ	Graduate transferred to Chadron State
Ashtin Chastain	41	C	6'11"	245	RS Junior	Norco, CA	Left the team for personal reasons

=== Incoming transfers ===
Name	Number	Pos.	Height	Weight	Year	Hometown	Previous college
Eduardo Lane	12	F	6'10"	233	Junior	Campo Grande, Brazil	Junior college transferred from Marshalltown CC
Richard Washington	22	G	6'6"	195	Junior	Newport News, VA	Junior college transferred from Tallahassee CC
Rodney Agee	35	F	6'9"	235	Junior	Victorville, CA	Junior college transferred from East LA College

=== 2019 recruiting class ===
College recruiting
Name	Hometown	School	Height	Weight	Commit date
Omari Moore; SG	Los Angeles, CA	Middlebrooks Academy	6 ft 6 in (1.98 m)	185 lb (84 kg)	Aug 1, 2018
Omari Moore; SG	Recruit ratings: Scout: Rivals: 247Sports: ESPN:				
Overall recruit ranking: Scout: – Rivals: –
Note: In many cases, Scout, Rivals, 247Sports, On3, and ESPN may conflict in their listings of height and weight.; In these cases, the average was taken. ESPN grades are on a 100-point scale.; Sources: "2019 San Jose State Basketball Recruiting Commits". Scout.; "Scout.com Team Recruiting Rankings". Scout.; "2019 Team Ranking". Rivals.

=== 2020 recruiting class ===
College recruiting (2020)
Name	Hometown	School	Height	Weight	Commit date
Sebastian Mendoza; SG	Riverside, CA	Hillcrest High School	6 ft 4 in (1.93 m)	N/A	
Sebastian Mendoza; SG	Recruit ratings: Scout: Rivals: 247Sports: ESPN:				
Hugo Clarkin; C	San Juan Capistrano, CA	JSerra Catholic High School	6 ft 10 in (2.08 m)	200 lb (91 kg)	Sep 11, 2019
Hugo Clarkin; C	Recruit ratings: Scout: Rivals: 247Sports: ESPN:				
Overall recruit ranking: Scout: – Rivals: –
Note: In many cases, Scout, Rivals, 247Sports, On3, and ESPN may conflict in their listings of height and weight.; In these cases, the average was taken. ESPN grades are on a 100-point scale.; Sources: "2020 San Jose State Basketball Recruiting Commits". Scout.; "Scout.com Team Recruiting Rankings". Scout.; "2020 Team Ranking". Rivals.

== Roster ==
2019–20 San Jose State Spartans men's basketball team
Players
Coaches

Pos.	#	Name	Height	Weight	Year	Previous school	Hometown
G	1	Caleb Simmons	6 ft 6 in (1.98 m)	195 lb (88 kg)	RS So	Desert Vista HS	Vallejo, California
G	2	Brae Ivey	6 ft 2 in (1.88 m)	185 lb (84 kg)	Sr	Riverside City College	Huntington Beach, California
G	4	Zach Chappell	6 ft 3 in (1.91 m)	175 lb (79 kg)	So	Capital Christian HS	Sacramento, California
G	5	Isaiah Nichols	6 ft 5 in (1.96 m)	180 lb (82 kg)	Sr	Santa Clara HS	Oxnard, California
F	10	Omari Moore	6 ft 6 in (1.98 m)	185 lb (84 kg)	Fr	Pasadena HS	Pasadena, California
F	11	Christian Anigwe	6 ft 9 in (2.06 m)	215 lb (98 kg)	So	Desert Vista HS	Phoenix, Arizona
G	12	Eduardo Lane	6 ft 10 in (2.08 m)	250 lb (113 kg)	Jr	Marshalltown CC	Aquidauana, Brazil
G/F	13	Seneca Knight	6 ft 6 in (1.98 m)	190 lb (86 kg)	So	Northside HS	Lafayette, Louisiana
C	14	Samuel Japhet-Mathias	6 ft 11 in (2.11 m)	280 lb (127 kg)	RS Jr	Wake Forest	London, England
G	21	Kaison Hammonds	6 ft 4 in (1.93 m)	170 lb (77 kg)	So	ThunderRidge HS	Highlands Ranch, Colorado
G	22	Richard Washington	6 ft 6 in (1.98 m)	185 lb (84 kg)	Jr	Tallahassee CC	Newport News, Virginia
F/C	25	Craig LeCesne	6 ft 9 in (2.06 m)	225 lb (102 kg)	Sr	San Bernardino Valley College	Malmö, Sweden
F	35	Ralph Agee	6 ft 8 in (2.03 m)	220 lb (100 kg)	Jr	East Los Angeles CC	Victorville, California
G	44	Trey Smith (W)	6 ft 3 in (1.91 m)	175 lb (79 kg)	So	Saddleback Valley Christian HS	Cypress, California
F/C	50	Harminder Dhaliwal (W)	6 ft 10 in (2.08 m)	240 lb (109 kg)	Fr	Aliso Niguel HS	Laguna Niguel, California

Head coach

- Jean Prioleau (Fordham)

Assistant coach(es)

- Will Kimble (Pepperdine)
- Julius Hodge (NC State)
- Tim Marrion (Washington State)

Legend

- (C) Team captain
- (S) Suspended
- (I) Ineligible
- (W) Walk-on
- Injured
- Current redshirt

Roster

== Schedule and results ==
Date time, TV	Rank^{#}	Opponent^{#}	Result	Record	Site (attendance) city, state
Regular season
Nov 6, 2019*; 4:00 pm		at Hofstra	W 79–71	1–0	Mack Sports Complex (4,223); Hempstead, NY
Nov 10, 2019*; 2:00 pm		Portland	L 57–72	1–1	Provident Credit Union Event Center (1,441); San Jose, CA
Nov 14, 2019*; 5:00 pm, P12N		at No. 19 Arizona	L 39–87	1–2	McKale Center (12,755); Tucson, AZ
Nov 17, 2019*; 4:00 pm		Simpson; Las Vegas Classic	W 85–60	2–2	Provident Credit Union Event Center (1,511); San Jose, CA
Nov 20, 2019*; 7:00 pm		Grambling State; Las Vegas Classic	W 83–76	3–2	Provident Credit Union Event Center (1,437); San Jose, CA
Nov 23, 2019*; 7:00 pm		Portland State; Las Vegas Classic	L 76–91	3–3	Provident Credit Union Event Center (1,512); San Jose, CA
Nov 27, 2019*; 8:00 pm, FS1		vs. Oregon State; Las Vegas Classic	L 48–83	3–4	Orleans Arena (1,500); Paradise, NV
Dec 1, 2019*; 5:00 pm, P12N		at UCLA	L 64–93	3–5	Pauley Pavilion (4,801); Los Angeles, CA
Dec 4, 2019; 8:15 pm, ESPN2		No. 25 Utah State	L 59–71	3–6 (0–1)	Provident Credit Union Event Center (2,294); San Jose, CA
Dec 8, 2019; 12:00 pm		at San Diego State	L 57–59	3–7 (0–2)	Viejas Arena (11,925); San Diego, CA
Dec 14, 2019*; 4:00 pm, CBSSN		Stanford	L 58–78	3–8	Provident Credit Union Event Center (2,898); San Jose, CA
Dec 18, 2019*; 7:00 pm		at Santa Clara	L 84–89	3–9	Leavey Center (1,165); Santa Clara, CA
Dec 22, 2019*; 2:00 pm		UC Riverside	L 65–80	3–10	Provident Credit Union Event Center (1,264); San Jose, CA
Dec 28, 2019*; 6:00 pm		Pepperdine	W 83–68	4–10	Provident Credit Union Event Center (1,333); San Jose, CA
Jan 1, 2020; 7:00 pm		New Mexico	W 88–85	5–10 (1–2)	Provident Credit Union Event Center (1,288); San Jose, CA
Jan 4, 2020; 4:00 pm		at Fresno State	L 64–79	5–11 (1–3)	Save Mart Center (5,551); Fresno, CA
Jan 8, 2020; 7:00 pm		Nevada	W 70–68	6–11 (2–3)	Provident Credit Union Event Center (1,459); San Jose, CA
Jan 11, 2020; 2:00 pm		Colorado State	L 70–81	6–12 (2–4)	Provident Credit Union Event Center (1,363); San Jose, CA
Jan 22, 2020; 8:00 pm, ATTSN		at UNLV	L 87–98	6–13 (2–5)	Thomas & Mack Center (7,338); Paradise, NV
Jan 21, 2020; 8:00 pm, ATTSN		at New Mexico	L 59–86	6–14 (2–6)	Dreamstyle Arena (10,016); Albuquerque, NM
Jan 25, 2020; 2:00 pm		Air Force	W 90–81	7–14 (3–6)	Provident Credit Union Event Center (1,534); San Jose, CA
Jan 29, 2020; 6:00 pm		at Boise State	L 71–99	7–15 (3–7)	ExtraMile Arena (4,724); Boise, ID
Feb 1, 2020; 2:00 pm		Wyoming	L 66–71	7–16 (3–8)	Provident Credit Union Event Center (1,427); San Jose, CA
Feb 8, 2020; 4:00 pm, ATTSN		at Nevada	L 77–95	7–17 (3–9)	Lawlor Events Center (8,310); Reno, NV
Feb 12, 2020; 7:00 pm		Fresno State	L 78–84 ^{OT}	7–18 (3–10)	Provident Credit Union Event Center (1,848); San Jose, CA
Feb 15, 2020; 1:00 pm		at Air Force	L 86–95	7–19 (3–11)	Clune Arena (2,178); Colorado Springs, CO
Feb 19, 2020; 7:00 pm		Boise State	L 62–80	7–20 (3–14)	Provident Credit Union Event Center (1,339); San Jose, CA
Feb 22, 2020; 1:00 pm		at Colorado State	L 71–78	7–21 (3–15)	Moby Arena (4,588); Fort Collins, CO
Feb 25, 2020; 8:00 pm, ESPN2		at Utah State	L 56–94	7–22 (3–14)	Smith Spectrum (8,925); Logan, UT
Feb 29, 2020; 2:00 pm, ATTSN		UNLV	L 69–92	7–23 (3–15)	Provident Credit Union Event Center (2,074); San Jose, CA
Mountain West tournament
Mar 4, 2020; 2:30 pm, Stadium	(10)	vs. (7) New Mexico; First round	L 66–79	7–24	Thomas & Mack Center (5,198); Paradise, NV
*Non-conference game. ^{#}Rankings from AP Poll. (#) Tournament seedings in parentheses. All times are in Pacific Time.
