= 2020 Mountain West Conference men's basketball tournament =

Athletic competition

- Classification: Division I
- Season: 2019–20
- Teams: 11
- Site: Thomas & Mack Center; Paradise, Nevada
- Champions: Utah State (2nd title)
- Winning coach: Craig Smith (2nd title)
- MVP: Sam Merrill (Utah State)
- Television: Stadium, CBSSN, CBS

2019–20 Mountain West Conference men's basketball standings
	Conf.				Overall
Team	W		L	PCT	W		L	PCT
No. 6 San Diego State	17	–	1	.944	30	–	2	.938
Utah State †	12	–	6	.667	26	–	8	.765
Nevada	12	–	6	.667	19	–	12	.613
UNLV	12	–	6	.667	17	–	15	.531
Boise State	11	–	7	.611	20	–	12	.625
Colorado State	11	–	7	.611	20	–	12	.625
New Mexico	7	–	11	.389	19	–	14	.576
Fresno State	7	–	11	.389	11	–	19	.367
Air Force	5	–	13	.278	12	–	20	.375
San Jose State	3	–	15	.167	7	–	24	.226
Wyoming	2	–	16	.111	9	–	24	.273
† Conference tournament winner Rankings from AP poll

The 2020 Mountain West Conference men's basketball tournament was the postseason men's basketball tournament for the Mountain West Conference. It was held from March 4–7, 2020 at the Thomas & Mack Center on the campus of University of Nevada, Las Vegas, in Las Vegas, Nevada. Utah State upset heavily favored San Diego State to earn the Mountain West's automatic bid to the NCAA tournament.

== Seeds ==
All 11 MW schools were eligible to participate in the tournament. Teams were seeded by conference record. Ties were broken by record between the tied teams, followed by record against the regular-season champion, if necessary. As a result, the top five teams receive byes into the tournament quarterfinals. The remaining teams will play in the first round. Tie-breaking procedures remained unchanged from the 2019 tournament, except that RPI was replaced by the NCAA's new NET rating.

- Head-to-head record between the tied teams
- Record against the highest-seeded team not involved in the tie, going down through the seedings as necessary
- Higher NET

Seed	School	Conf	Tiebreaker(s)
1	San Diego State	17–1	
2	Utah State	12–6	1–0 vs Nevada
3	Nevada	12–6	0–1 vs Utah State
4	UNLV	12–6	1–3 vs Nevada/Utah State
5	Boise State	11–7	1–0 vs. Colorado State
6	Colorado State	11–7	0–1 vs. Boise State
7	New Mexico	7–11	1–0 vs Utah State
8	Fresno State	7–11	0–2 vs Utah State
9	Air Force	5–13	
10	San Jose State	3–15	
11	Wyoming	2–16	

== Schedule ==
Game	Time	Matchup	Score	Television	Attendance
First round – Wednesday, March 4
1	12:00 pm	No. 8 Fresno State vs. No. 9 Air Force	70–77	Stadium	5,198
2	2:30 pm	No. 7 New Mexico vs. No. 10 San Jose State	79–66	Stadium	5,198
3	5:00 pm	No. 6 Colorado State vs. No. 11 Wyoming	74–80	Stadium	5,198
Quarterfinals – Thursday, March 5
4	11:30 am	No. 1 San Diego State vs No. 9 Air Force	73–60	CBSSN	8,189
5	2:00 pm	No. 4 UNLV vs No. 5 Boise State	61–67	CBSSN	8,189
6	6:00 pm	No. 2 Utah State vs. No. 7 New Mexico	75–70	CBSSN	7,723
7	8:30 pm	No. 3 Nevada vs. No. 11 Wyoming	71–74	CBSSN	7,723
Semifinals – Friday, March 6
8	6:00 pm	No. 1 San Diego State vs. No. 5 Boise State	81–68	CBSSN	9,630
9	8:30 pm	No. 2 Utah State vs. No. 11 Wyoming	89–82	CBSSN	9,630
Championship – Saturday, March 7
10	2:30 pm	No. 1 San Diego State vs. No. 2 Utah State	56–59	CBS	10,292
Game times in PT. Rankings denote tournament seeding.

== Bracket ==
First round March 4 MWN
8	Fresno State	70
9	Air Force	77
7	New Mexico	79
10	San Jose State	66
6	Colorado State	74
11	Wyoming	80

Quarterfinals; March 5 CBSSN
1	#5 San Diego State	73
9	Air Force	60
4	UNLV	61
5	Boise State	67
2	Utah State	75
7	New Mexico	70
3	Nevada	71
11	Wyoming	74

Semifinals; March 6 CBSSN
1	#5 San Diego State	81
5	Boise State	68
2	Utah State	89
11	Wyoming	82

Championship; March 7 CBS
1	#5 San Diego State	56
2	Utah State	59

* denotes overtime period

== See also ==
- 2020 Mountain West Conference women's basketball tournament
