= 2019–20 Fresno State Bulldogs men's basketball team =

American college basketball season

2019–20 Fresno State Bulldogs men's basketball
- Conference: Mountain West Conference
- Record: 11–19 (7–11 MW)
- Head coach: Justin Hutson (2nd season)
- Assistant coaches: Keith Brown; Tarvish Felton; Tim Shelton
- Home arena: Save Mart Center (Capacity: 15,596)

2019–20 Mountain West Conference men's basketball standings
	Conf.				Overall
Team	W		L	PCT	W		L	PCT
No. 6 San Diego State	17	–	1	.944	30	–	2	.938
Utah State †	12	–	6	.667	26	–	8	.765
Nevada	12	–	6	.667	19	–	12	.613
UNLV	12	–	6	.667	17	–	15	.531
Boise State	11	–	7	.611	20	–	12	.625
Colorado State	11	–	7	.611	20	–	12	.625
New Mexico	7	–	11	.389	19	–	14	.576
Fresno State	7	–	11	.389	11	–	19	.367
Air Force	5	–	13	.278	12	–	20	.375
San Jose State	3	–	15	.167	7	–	24	.226
Wyoming	2	–	16	.111	9	–	24	.273
† Conference tournament winner Rankings from AP poll

The 2019–20 Fresno State Bulldogs men's basketball team represented California State University, Fresno in the 2019–20 NCAA Division I men's basketball season. The Bulldogs were led by second-year head coach Justin Hutson and played their home games at the Save Mart Center as members of the Mountain West Conference. They finished the season 11–19, 7–11 in Mountain West play to finish in a tie for seventh place. They lost in the first round of the Mountain West tournament to Air Force.

== Previous season ==
The Bulldogs finished the season 23–9, 13–5 in Mountain West play to finish in third place. They defeated Air Force in the quarterfinals of the Mountain West tournament before losing in the semifinals to Utah State. Despite having 23 wins, they did not participate in a postseason tournament.

== Offseason ==
=== Departures ===
Name	Number	Pos.	Height	Weight	Year	Hometown	Reason for departure
Johnny McWilliams	3	G	6'6"	200	Junior	San Marcos, CA	Left the team for personal reasons
Braxton Huggins	4	G	6'4"	195	Senior	Bakersfield, CA	Graduated
Amrit Dhaliwal	10	G	5'11"	165	Freshman	Modesto, CA	Transferred
Myles Fitzgerald-Warren	12	F	6'3"	180	Sophomore	Portland, OR	Transferred to Collin College
Sam Bittner	20	G	6'6"	210	Senior	Las Vegas, NV	Walk-on; graduated
Deshon Taylor	21	G	6'2"	185	RS Senior	Riverside, CA	Graduated

=== Incoming transfers ===
Name	Number	Pos.	Height	Weight	Year	Hometown	Previous college
Jordan Campbell	5	G	6'3"	195	RS Freshman	Adelanto, CA	Transferred from Oregon State in January during the 2018–19 season. Under NCAA transfer rules, Campbell has to sit out until January and will be eligible to start in January during the 2019–20 season. Campbell has three and a half years of remaining eligibility.
Mustafa Lawrence	12	G	6'0"	180	Junior	Newark, NJ	Junior college transferred from Tallahassee CC
C. J. Hyder	14	G	6'3"	195	Junior	San Bernardino, CA	Junior college transferred from Mt. San Jacinto College. Will join the team as a walk-on.
Alec Hickman	20	G	6'4"	180	Junior	Riverside, CA	Junior college transferred from East LA College

=== 2019 recruiting class ===
College recruiting information
Name	Hometown	School	Height	Weight	Commit date
Orlando Robinson; PF	Las Vegas, NV	Middlebrooks Academy	6 ft 10 in (2.08 m)	205 lb (93 kg)	Oct 12, 2018
Orlando Robinson; PF	Recruit ratings: Scout: Rivals: 247Sports: ESPN: (NR)				
Jarred Hyder; SG	La Verne, CA	Damien High School	6 ft 3 in (1.91 m)	170 lb (77 kg)	Nov 10, 2018
Jarred Hyder; SG	Recruit ratings: Scout: Rivals: 247Sports: ESPN: (NR)				
Anthony Holland; SG	Riverside, CA	Notre Dame High School	6 ft 6 in (1.98 m)	212 lb (96 kg)	Nov 14, 2018
Anthony Holland; SG	Recruit ratings: Scout: Rivals: 247Sports: ESPN: (NR)				
Niven Glover; SG	Orlando, FL	Oak High School	6 ft 6 in (1.98 m)	212 lb (96 kg)	Aug 4, 2019
Niven Glover; SG	Recruit ratings: Scout: Rivals: 247Sports: ESPN: (NR)				
Overall recruit ranking: Scout: – Rivals: –
Note: In many cases, Scout, Rivals, 247Sports, On3, and ESPN may conflict in their listings of height and weight.; In these cases, the average was taken. ESPN grades are on a 100-point scale.; Sources: "Fresno State Commit List for 2019". Rivals.; "Men's Basketball Recruiting". Scout.; "ESPN – Fresno State Bulldogs Basketball Recruiting 2019". ESPN.; "Scout.com Team Recruiting Rankings". Scout.; "2019 Team Ranking". Rivals.

=== 2020 recruiting class ===
College recruiting information (2020)
Name	Hometown	School	Height	Weight	Commit date
Braxton Meah; C	Fresno, CA	San Joaquin Memorial High School	6 ft 11 in (2.11 m)	230 lb (100 kg)	Jul 10, 2019
Braxton Meah; C	Recruit ratings: Scout: Rivals: 247Sports: ESPN: (NR)				
Destin Whitaker; SG	Romeoville, IL	Romeoville High School	6 ft 4 in (1.93 m)	175 lb (79 kg)	Sep 10, 2019
Destin Whitaker; SG	Recruit ratings: Scout: Rivals: 247Sports: ESPN: (NR)				
Leonardo Colimerio; SF	Mount Pleasant, UT	Wasatch Academy	6 ft 7 in (2.01 m)	180 lb (82 kg)	Sep 12, 2019
Leonardo Colimerio; SF	Recruit ratings: Scout: Rivals: 247Sports: ESPN: (NR)				
Overall recruit ranking: Scout: – Rivals: –
Note: In many cases, Scout, Rivals, 247Sports, On3, and ESPN may conflict in their listings of height and weight.; In these cases, the average was taken. ESPN grades are on a 100-point scale.; Sources: "Fresno State Commit List for 2020". Rivals.; "Men's Basketball Recruiting". Scout.; "ESPN – Fresno State Bulldogs Basketball Recruiting 2020". ESPN.; "Scout.com Team Recruiting Rankings". Scout.; "2020 Team Ranking". Rivals.

== Roster ==
2019–20 Fresno State Bulldogs men's basketball team
Players
Coaches

Pos.	#	Name	Height	Weight	Year	Previous school	Hometown
G	0	New Williams	6 ft 2 in (1.88 m)	175 lb (79 kg)	RS Jr	Auburn	Inglewood, California
F	1	Chris Seeley	6 ft 8 in (2.03 m)	215 lb (98 kg)	RS So	Utah	Fresno, California
G	3	Jarred Hyder	6 ft 3 in (1.91 m)	180 lb (82 kg)	Fr	Damien HS	San Bernardino, California
G	4	Niven Hart	6 ft 5 in (1.96 m)	205 lb (93 kg)	Fr	Oak Ridge HS	Orlando, Florida
F	10	Orlando Robinson	6 ft 10 in (2.08 m)	235 lb (107 kg)	Fr	Middlebrooks Academy	Las Vegas, Nevada
F	11	Christian Gray	6 ft 6 in (1.98 m)	240 lb (109 kg)	Sr	Salt Lake CC	Moreno Valley, California
G	12	Mustafa Lawrence	6 ft 1 in (1.85 m)	180 lb (82 kg)	Jr	Tallahassee CC	Newark, New Jersey
G	13	Aguir Agau	6 ft 7 in (2.01 m)	190 lb (86 kg)	So	Cathedral HS	Omaha, Nebraska
G	14	C. J. Hyder (W)	6 ft 2 in (1.88 m)	190 lb (86 kg)	Jr	Mt. San Jacinto College	San Bernardino, California
G	20	Alec Hickman (W)	6 ft 4 in (1.93 m)	195 lb (88 kg)	Jr	East LA College	Riverside, California
C	21	Assane Diouf	7 ft 2 in (2.18 m)	275 lb (125 kg)	RS Fr	DME Academy	Dakar, Senegal
G	25	Antony Holland	6 ft 5 in (1.96 m)	215 lb (98 kg)	Fr	Notre Dame HS	Riverside, California
F	32	Nate Grimes	6 ft 8 in (2.03 m)	225 lb (102 kg)	RS Sr	Quality Education HS	Las Vegas, Nevada
F/C	35	Lázaro Rojas	6 ft 11 in (2.11 m)	235 lb (107 kg)	RS So	Score Academy HS	São José dos Campos, Brazil
G	55	Noah Blackwell	6 ft 3 in (1.91 m)	190 lb (86 kg)	RS Jr	Long Beach State	Roseville, California

Head coach

- Justin Hutson (Cal State Bakersfield)

Assistant coach(es)

- Keith Brown (Pacific)
- Tarvish Felton (Southern Utah)
- Tim Shelton (San Diego State)

Legend

- (C) Team captain
- (S) Suspended
- (I) Ineligible
- (W) Walk-on
- Injured
- Current redshirt

Roster

== Schedule and results ==
Date time, TV	Rank^{#}	Opponent^{#}	Result	Record	High points	High rebounds	High assists	Site (attendance) city, state
Exhibition
October 30, 2019*; 7:00 pm		Dominican	W 86–57	–	–	–	–	Save Mart Center; Fresno, CA
Regular season
November 5, 2019*; 6:00 pm, P12N		at No. 15 Oregon	L 57–71	0–1	13 – Grimes	8 – Robinson	6 – Lawrence	Matthew Knight Arena (6,779); Eugene, OR
November 10, 2019*; 2:00 pm		Winthrop; Sacramento Classic	W 77–74	1–1	26 – Hyder	15 – Grimes	4 – Lawrence	Save Mart Center (8,529); Fresno, CA
November 12, 2019*; 7:00 pm		at San Diego	L 66–72 ^{OT}	1–2	23 – Hyder	10 – Grimes	4 – Lawrence	Jenny Craig Pavilion (1,145); San Diego, CA
November 17, 2019*; 2:00 pm		Cal State San Marcos	W 92–47	2–2	20 – Agau	7 – 3 tied	8 – Blackwell	Save Mart Center (4,693); Fresno, CA
November 20, 2019*; 8:00 pm, ESPNU		vs. Saint Mary's; Sacramento Classic	L 58–68	2–3	20 – Hyder	9 – Grimes	3 – Blackwell	Golden 1 Center (4,774); Sacramento, CA
November 30, 2019*; 3:00 pm, BigWest.TV		at Cal State Northridge	L 72–73	2–4	20 – Grimes	11 – Grimes	5 – Blackwell	Matadome (545); Nortridge, CA
December 4, 2019; 7:00 pm, ATTSNRM		UNLV	L 80–81 ^{2OT}	2–5 (0–1)	18 – Blackwell	12 – Grimes	5 – Lawrence	Save Mart Center (5,436); Fresno, CA
December 7, 2019; 3:00 pm, ATTSNRM		at No. 25 Utah State	L 70–77 ^{OT}	2–6 (0–2)	26 – Williams	10 – Grimes	3 – Hyder	Smith Spectrum (9,815); Logan, UT
December 11, 2019*; 7:00 pm, P12N		at California	L 63–69	2–7	21 – Williams	14 – Grimes	2 – Hyder	Haas Pavilion (3,211); Berkeley, CA
December 14, 2019*; 7:00 pm		at Cal Poly	W 62–37	3–7	23 – Grimes	15 – Robinson	5 – Lawrence	Mott Center (1,965); San Luis Obispo, CA
December 20, 2019*; 7:00 pm, KAIL		IUPUI	W 95–64	4–7	24 – Williams	9 – Robinson	9 – Lawrence	Save Mart Center (4,798); Fresno, CA
December 23, 2019*; 7:00 pm, KAIL		San Francisco	L 69–71	4–8	24 – Robinson	9 – Grimes	7 – Lawrence	Save Mart Center (4,693); Fresno, CA
December 28, 2019*; 6:00 pm, KAIL		UC Riverside	L 57–60	4–9	27 – Robinson	5 – 2 tied	5 – Lawrence	Save Mart Center (4,740); Fresno, CA
January 1, 2020; 12:00 pm, Stadium		at No. 13 San Diego State	L 52–61	4–10 (0–3)	23 – Hyder	8 – Agau	2 – Hyder	Viejas Arena (12,414); San Diego, CA
January 4, 2020; 4:00 pm, KAIL		San Jose State	W 79–64	5–10 (1–3)	32 – Williams	14 – Robinson	6 – Hyder	Save Mart Center (5,551); Fresno, CA
January 7, 2020; 8:00 pm, ESPNU		at New Mexico	L 64–78	5–11 (1–4)	16 – Robinson	12 – Robinson	4 – Hyder	Dreamstyle Arena (10,010); Albuquerque, NM
January 14, 2020; 8:00 pm, ESPN2		No. 7 San Diego State	L 55–64	5–12 (1–5)	18 – Robinson	7 – Grimes	2 – Tied	Save Mart Center (6,773); Fresno, CA
January 18, 2020; 3:00 pm		at Wyoming	W 65–50	6–12 (2–5)	19 – Robinson	12 – Grimes	3 – Robinson	Arena-Auditorium (3,226); Laramie, WY
January 22, 2020; 6:00 pm, ESPN3		at Colorado State	L 68–86	6–13 (2–6)	23 – Grimes	9 – Grimes	4 – Robinson	Moby Arena (2,931); Fort Collins, CO
January 25, 2020; 5:00 pm, ATTSNRM		Boise State	L 53–87	6–14 (2–7)	14 – Blackwell	5 – Tied	1 – 4 tied	Save Mart Center (6,432); Fresno, CA
January 28, 2020; 6:00 pm, ATTSNRM		at Air Force	W 79–68	7–14 (3–7)	25 – Williams	9 – Grimes	5 – Hyder	Clune Arena (1,535); Colorado Springs, CO
February 1, 2020; 2:00 pm, ATTSNRM		New Mexico	W 82–77	8–14 (4–7)	20 – Robinson	15 – Robinson	5 – Hyder	Save Mart Center (5,144); Fresno, CA
February 4, 2020; 6:00 pm, CBSSN		Colorado State	L 70–80	8–15 (4–8)	29 – Hart	11 – Grimes	3 – Tied	Save Mart Center (5,842); Fresno, CA
February 8, 2020; 5:00 pm, ESPNU		at UNLV	L 67–68	8–16 (4–9)	24 – Robinson	10 – Grimes	5 – Blackwell	Thomas & Mack Center (8,497); Paradise, NV
February 12, 2020; 7:00 pm		at San Jose State	W 84–78 ^{OT}	9–16 (5–9)	30 – Hart	12 – Robinson	7 – Williams	Provident Credit Union Event Center (1,848); San Jose, CA
February 15, 2020; 7:00 pm, ESPNU		Utah State	L 59–71	9–17 (5–10)	13 – Blackwell	10 – Grimes	5 – Williams	Save Mart Center (5,671); Fresno, CA
February 19, 2020; 7:00 pm, ESPN3		Air Force	W 71–62	10–17 (6–10)	25 – Blackwell	14 – Grimes	6 – Hyder	Save Mart Center (4,608); Fresno, CA
February 22, 2020; 7:00 pm, ESPNU		at Nevada	L 76–78	10–18 (6–11)	18 – Hart	10 – Grimes	2 – Williams	Lawlor Events Center (9,155); Reno, NV
February 29, 2020; 4:00 pm, KAIL		Wyoming	W 63–55	11–18 (7–11)	11 – Tied	14 – Grimes	5 – Williams	Save Mart Center (7,156); Fresno, CA
Mountain West tournament
March 4, 2020; 12:00 pm, Stadium	(8)	vs. (9) Air Force; First round	L 70–77	11–19	21 – Williams	11 – Grimes	6 – Hyder	Thomas & Mack Center (5,198); Paradise, NV
*Non-conference game. ^{#}Rankings from AP Poll. (#) Tournament seedings in parentheses. All times are in Pacific Time.
