= 2019–20 Utah State Aggies men's basketball team =

American college basketball season

2019–20 Utah State Aggies men's basketball

Jamaica Classic champions MWC tournament champions
- Conference: Mountain West Conference
- Record: 26–8 (12–6 MW)
- Head coach: Craig Smith (2nd season)
- Assistant coaches: Austin Hansen; Eric Peterson; David Ragland
- Home arena: Smith Spectrum

2019–20 Mountain West Conference men's basketball standings
	Conf.				Overall
Team	W		L	PCT	W		L	PCT
No. 6 San Diego State	17	–	1	.944	30	–	2	.938
Utah State †	12	–	6	.667	26	–	8	.765
Nevada	12	–	6	.667	19	–	12	.613
UNLV	12	–	6	.667	17	–	15	.531
Boise State	11	–	7	.611	20	–	12	.625
Colorado State	11	–	7	.611	20	–	12	.625
New Mexico	7	–	11	.389	19	–	14	.576
Fresno State	7	–	11	.389	11	–	19	.367
Air Force	5	–	13	.278	12	–	20	.375
San Jose State	3	–	15	.167	7	–	24	.226
Wyoming	2	–	16	.111	9	–	24	.273
† Conference tournament winner Rankings from AP poll

The 2019–20 Utah State Aggies men's basketball team represented Utah State University in the 2019–20 NCAA Division I men's basketball season. The Aggies, led by second-year head coach Craig Smith, played their home games at the Smith Spectrum in Logan, Utah as members of the Mountain West Conference. They finished the season 26–8, 12–6 in Mountain West play, to finish in a three-way tie for second place. They defeated New Mexico, Wyoming and San Diego State to become champions of the Mountain West tournament, their second consecutive Mountain West tournament championship. They earned the Mountain West's automatic bid to the NCAA tournament. However, on March 12, 2020 it was announced that the NCAA tournament would be cancelled due to the COVID-19 pandemic.

== Previous season ==
The Aggies shared the regular-season Mountain West title with Nevada, and defeated New Mexico, Fresno State and San Diego State to win the Mountain West tournament to earn the Mountain West's automatic bid to the NCAA tournament for their first appearance since 2011. They lost in the first round of the NCAA tournament to Washington.

== Offseason ==
=== Departures ===
Name	Number	Pos.	Height	Weight	Year	Hometown	Reason for departure
Tauriawn Knight	1	G	6' 1"	170	Freshman	Edmond, OK	Transferred
Dwayne Brown Jr.	2	G/F	6' 6"	220	Senior	Conyers, GA	Graduated
John Knight III	3	G	6' 2"	195	Sophomore	Jackson, MS	Transferred to SUU
Crew Ainge	4	F	5' 11"	180	RS Sophomore	Wellesley, MA	Transferred to Babson
Quinn Taylor	10	F	6' 8"	240	RS Senior	Houston, TX	Graduated
Ke'Sean Davis	13	F	6' 7"	225	Junior	Compton, CA	Left team
Ben Fakira	21	F	6' 10"	240	Freshman	Sydney, Australia	Left team

=== Incoming college transfers ===
Name	Number	Pos.	Height	Weight	Year	Hometown	Previous college
Carson Bischoff	1	G	6' 4"	210	Junior	Ogden, UT	Junior college transfer from Treasury Valley CC
Alphonso Anderson	10	F	6' 6"	220	Junior	Tacoma, WA	Junior college transfer from North Idaho College
Marco Anthony	44	F	6' 5"	225	Junior	San Antonio, TX	Transfer from Virginia
Kuba Karwowski	52	C	7' 2"	220	Junior	Warsaw, Poland	Junior college transfer from North Platte CC

=== Recruiting ===
College recruiting
Name	Hometown	School	Height	Weight	Commit date
Liam McChesney; PF	Prince Rupert, BC	Charles Hays	6 ft 9 in (2.06 m)	195 lb (88 kg)	Nov 12, 2018
Liam McChesney; PF	Recruit ratings: Rivals: 247Sports: (NR)				
Sean Bairstow; SF	Brisbane, Australia	Churchie	6 ft 7 in (2.01 m)	180 lb (82 kg)	Feb 27, 2019
Sean Bairstow; SF	Recruit ratings: Rivals: 247Sports: (NR)				
Cade Potter; PF	Orange, CA	Orange Lutheran	6 ft 8 in (2.03 m)	210 lb (95 kg)	Sep 1, 2018
Cade Potter; PF	Recruit ratings: Rivals: 247Sports: (NR)				
Overall recruit ranking: Scout: – Rivals: – 247Sports: #65
Note: In many cases, Scout, Rivals, 247Sports, On3, and ESPN may conflict in their listings of height and weight.; In these cases, the average was taken. ESPN grades are on a 100-point scale.; Sources: "2019 Team Ranking". Rivals.

== Preseason ==
=== Mountain West media poll ===
The Mountain West Conference media poll was released on October 15, 2019. The Aggies were unanimously selected by MW media members as the preseason favorites.

Media poll
Predicted finish	Team
1	Utah State
2	San Diego State
3	New Mexico
4	Nevada
5	Boise State
6	Fresno State
7	UNLV
8	Air Force
9	Colorado State
10	Wyoming
11	San Jose State

=== Preseason All-MWC teams ===
Sam Merrill and Neemias Queta were selected to the All-MWC Preseason Team. Merrill was additionally selected as the Mountain West Preseason Player of the Year.

== Roster ==
2019–20 Utah State Aggies men's basketball team
Players
Coaches

Pos.	#	Name	Height	Weight	Year	Previous school	Hometown
F	0	Klay Stall	6 ft 10 in (2.08 m)	245 lb (111 kg)	RS Jr	Basha HS	Chandler, AZ
G	1	Carson Bischoff (W)	6 ft 4 in (1.93 m)	210 lb (95 kg)	Jr	Weber HS	Ogden, UT
G	2	Sean Bairstow	6 ft 8 in (2.03 m)	190 lb (86 kg)	Fr	Churchie	Brisbane, Australia
F	4	Roche Grootfaam	6 ft 7 in (2.01 m)	265 lb (120 kg)	Sr	Covenant Christian Academy; College of Southern Idaho	Paramaribo, Suriname
G	5	Sam Merrill	6 ft 5 in (1.96 m)	205 lb (93 kg)	Sr	Bountiful HS	Bountiful, UT
F	10	Alphonso Anderson	6 ft 6 in (1.98 m)	220 lb (100 kg)	Jr	Garfield HS; North Idaho College	Tacoma, WA
F	13	Liam McChesney	6 ft 10 in (2.08 m)	185 lb (84 kg)	Fr	Charles Hays	Prince Rupert, BC
G	15	Abel Porter	6 ft 3 in (1.91 m)	200 lb (91 kg)	RS Jr	Davis HS	Farmington, UT
G	22	Brock Miller	6 ft 5 in (1.96 m)	200 lb (91 kg)	RS So	Brighton HS	Sandy, UT
C	23	Neemias Queta	7 ft 0 in (2.13 m)	245 lb (111 kg)	So	Benfica	Barreiro, Portugal
G	24	Diogo Brito	6 ft 5 in (1.96 m)	205 lb (93 kg)	RS Sr	Mountain Mission School	Póvoa de Varzim, Portugal
C	32	Trevin Dorius	7 ft 0 in (2.13 m)	240 lb (109 kg)	RS Fr	Wasatch HS	Heber City, UT
F	34	Justin Bean	6 ft 7 in (2.01 m)	210 lb (95 kg)	RS So	Southmoore HS	Moore, OK
G	44	Marco Anthony (I) (redshirt)	6 ft 5 in (1.96 m)	225 lb (102 kg)	Jr	Holmes HS; Virginia	San Antonio, TX
C	52	Kuba Karwowski	7 ft 2 in (2.18 m)	220 lb (100 kg)	Jr	North Platte CC	Warsaw, Poland

Head coach

- Craig Smith (North Dakota)

Assistant coach(es)

- Austin Hansen (South Dakota State)
- Eric Peterson (UW–La Crosse)
- David Ragland (Southern Indiana)

Legend

- (C) Team captain
- (S) Suspended
- (I) Ineligible
- (W) Walk-on
- Injured
- Current redshirt

Roster
Last update: April 4, 2025

== Schedule and results ==
Date time, TV	Rank^{#}	Opponent^{#}	Result	Record	High points	High rebounds	High assists	Site (attendance) city, state
Exhibition
October 30, 2019*; 7:00 p.m.	No. 17	College of Idaho	W 103–66		19 – Brito	11 – Anderson	7 – Bairstow	Smith Spectrum (6,017); Logan, UT
Regular season
November 5, 2019*; 8:00 p.m., ATTSNRM	No. 17	Montana State	W 81–73	1–0	28 – Merrill	10 – Bean	4 – Porter	Smith Spectrum (7,331); Logan, UT
November 8, 2019*; 7:00 p.m., Stadium	No. 17	Weber State	W 89–34	2–0	18 – Bean	9 – Bean	10 – Porter	Smith Spectrum (8,840); Logan, UT
November 12, 2019*; 7:00 p.m., Stadium	No. 17	Denver	W 97–56	3–0	27 – Miller	15 – Bean	5 – tied	Smith Spectrum (6,504); Logan, UT
November 15, 2019*; 7:00 p.m., Stadium	No. 17	North Carolina A&T; Jamaica Classic	W 81–54	4–0	21 – Anderson	10 – Bean	5 – Merrill	Smith Spectrum (8,864); Logan, UT
November 18, 2019*; 7:00 p.m., Stadium	No. 15	UTSA	W 82–50	5–0	21 – Merrill	11 – tied	5 – Bean	Smith Spectrum (8,667); Logan, UT
November 22, 2019*; 2:30 p.m., CBSSN	No. 15	vs. LSU; Jamaica Classic	W 80–78	6–0	24 – tied	12 – Bean	8 – Merrill	Montego Bay Convention Centre (1,452); Montego Bay, Jamaica
November 24, 2019*; 4:30 p.m., CBSSN	No. 15	vs. North Texas; Jamaica Classic	W 68–59	7–0	19 – Anderson	13 – Bean	3 – Merrill	Montego Bay Convention Centre; Montego Bay, Jamaica
November 29, 2019*; 9:30 p.m., ESPNU	No. 15	at Saint Mary's	L 73–81	7–1	24 – Bean	9 – Bean	7 – Porter	McKeon Pavilion (3,500); Moraga, CA
December 4, 2019; 9:15 p.m., ESPN2	No. 25	at San Jose State	W 71–59	8–1 (1–0)	18 – Bean	14 – Bean	3 – tied	Provident Credit Union Event Center (2,294); San Jose, CA
December 7, 2019; 4:00 p.m., ATTSNRM	No. 25	Fresno State	W 77–70 ^{OT}	9–1 (2–0)	24 – Merrill	13 – Bean	5 – Brito	Smith Spectrum (9,815); Logan, UT
December 10, 2019*; 7:00 p.m.		Saint Katherine	W 94–49	10–1	22 – Miller	14 – Bean	5 – Bairstow	Smith Spectrum (6,006); Logan, UT
December 14, 2019*; 5:00 p.m., BYU TV		vs. BYU; Old Oquirrh Bucket/Beehive Classic	L 64–68	10–2	14 – Anderson	10 – Bean	4 – Porter	Vivint Smart Home Arena (10,291); Salt Lake City, UT
December 18, 2019*; 5:45 p.m., ESPN3		vs. South Florida; Battleground 2K19	W 76–74 ^{OT}	11–2	21 – Merrill	9 – Bean	7 – Porter	Toyota Center (18,055); Houston, TX
December 21, 2019*; 12:30 p.m., FS1		vs. Florida; Orange Bowl Basketball Classic	W 65–62	12–2	21 – Merrill	9 – 2 tied	5 – 2 tied	BB&T Center (8,927); Sunrise, FL
December 28, 2019*; 2:00 p.m.		Eastern Oregon	W 129–61	13–2	25 – Miller	12 – Bean	11 – Brito	Smith Spectrum (8,338); Logan, UT
January 1, 2020; 9:00 p.m., CBSSN		at UNLV	L 53–70	13–3 (2–1)	17 – Bean	11 – Bean	3 – Porter	Thomas & Mack Center (7,571); Las Vegas, NV
January 4, 2020; 8:00 p.m., CBSSN		No. 13 San Diego State	L 69–77	13–4 (2–2)	26 – Merrill	14 – Queta	5 – Porter	Smith Spectrum (10,017); Logan, UT
January 7, 2020; 9:00 p.m., ESPN2		at Air Force	L 60–79	13–5 (2–3)	16 – Miller	5 – Bean	3 – Porter	Clune Arena (4,563); Colorado Springs, CO
January 11, 2020; 6:00 p.m., CBSSN		Nevada	W 80–70	14–5 (3–3)	19 – Queta	8 – Merrill	8 – Merrill	Smith Spectrum (8,725); Logan, UT
January 18, 2020; 8:00 p.m., ESPNU		at Boise State	L 83–88 ^{OT}	14–6 (3–4)	30 – Merrill	10 – Bean	4 – Porter	ExtraMile Arena (6,047); Boise, ID
January 21, 2020; 9:00 p.m., ESPNU		Air Force	W 72–47	15–6 (4–4)	16 – Bean	13 – Bean	5 – Bean	Smith Spectrum (8,442); Logan, UT
January 25, 2020; 8:00 p.m., ESPNU		Colorado State	W 77–61	16–6 (5–4)	28 – Merrill	9 – Bean	5 – 3 tied	Smith Spectrum (9,791); Logan, UT
January 28, 2020; 9:00 p.m., ESPNU		at Wyoming	W 68–45	17–6 (6–4)	14 – Merrill	12 – Queta	4 – Brito	Arena-Auditorium (3,115); Laramie, WY
February 1, 2020; 8:00 p.m., CBSSN		at No. 4 San Diego State	L 68–80	17–7 (6–5)	16 – Merrill	6 – Queta	12 – Merrill	Viejas Arena (12,414); San Diego, CA
February 5, 2020; 8:00 p.m., CBSSN		UNLV	W 69–54	18–7 (7–5)	21 – Queta	11 – Bean	5 – Queta	Smith Spectrum (8,987); Logan, UT
February 8, 2020; 8:00 p.m., CBSSN		Boise State	W 70–61	19–7 (8–5)	21 – Queta	16 – Bean	4 – tied	Smith Spectrum (10,033); Logan, UT
February 11, 2020; 7:30 p.m., CBSSN		at Colorado State	W 75–72	20–7 (9–5)	32 – Merrill	11 – Queta	5 – Merrill	Moby Arena (4,038); Fort Collins, CO
February 15, 2020; 8:00 p.m., ESPNU		at Fresno State	W 71–59	21–7 (10–5)	24 – Merrill	11 – Bean	4 – Merrill	Save Mart Center (5,671); Fresno, CA
February 19, 2020; 7:00 p.m., ESPN3		Wyoming	W 78–58	22–7 (11–5)	26 – Merrill	15 – Queta	5 – Brito	Smith Spectrum (9,452); Logan, UT
February 25, 2020; 9:00 p.m., ESPN2		San Jose State	W 94–56	23–7 (12–5)	23 – Queta	13 – Bean	7 – Merrill	Smith Spectrum (8,925); Logan, UT
February 29, 2020; 8:00 p.m., CBSSN		at New Mexico	L 64–66	23–8 (12–6)	18 – Queta	14 – Queta	7 – Brito	Dreamstyle Arena (11,215); Albuquerque, NM
Mountain West tournament
March 5, 2020; 7:00 p.m., CBSSN	(2)	vs. (7) New Mexico; Quarterfinals	W 75–70	24–8	29 – Merrill	15 – Bean	2 – tied	Thomas & Mack Center (7,723); Paradise, NV
March 6, 2020; 8:30 p.m., CBSSN	(2)	vs. (11) Wyoming; Semifinals	W 89–82	25–8	27 – Merrill	10 – Bean	7 – Merrill	Thomas & Mack Center (9,630); Paradise, NV
March 7, 2020; 2:30 p.m., CBS	(2)	vs. (1) No. 5 San Diego State; Championship	W 59–56	26–8	27 – Merrill	12 – Bean	4 – Bean	Thomas & Mack Center (10,292); Paradise, NV
*Non-conference game. ^{#}Rankings from AP poll. (#) Tournament seedings in parentheses. All times are in Mountain.

== Rankings ==
Ranking movements Legend: ██ Increase in ranking ██ Decrease in ranking — = Not ranked RV = Received votes
	Week																			
Poll	Pre	1	2	3	4	5	6	7	8	9	10	11	12	13	14	15	16	17	18	Final
AP	17	17	15	15	25	RV	RV	RV	RV	—	—	—	—	—	—	RV	RV	—	RV	RV
Coaches	19	19	16	15	RV	RV	RV	RV	RV	—	—	—	—	—	—	—	—	—	RV	RV

*AP does not release post-NCAA tournament rankings.
