= Amauri Hardy =

American-Syrian basketball player (born 1998)

No. 8 – Grand Rapids Gold
- Position: Point guard
- League: NBA G League

Personal information
- Born: April 30, 1998 (age 28) Detroit, Michigan, U.S.
- Listed height: 6 ft 1 in (1.85 m)
- Listed weight: 200 lb (91 kg)

Career information
- High school: Southfield (Southfield, Michigan); North Farmington (Farmington Hills, Michigan)
- College: UNLV (2017–2020); Oregon (2020–2021)
- NBA draft: 2021: undrafted
- Playing career: 2021–present

Career history
- 2021–2022: NBA G League Ignite
- 2022–2023: Texas Legends
- 2023: Maroussi
- 2024: Iowa Wolves
- 2024: Pioneros de Los Mochis
- 2025–present: Grand Rapids Gold

Career highlights
- Third-team All-MWC (2020)

Amauri Jeremiah Hardy (born April 30, 1998) is an American-Syrian professional basketball player for the Grand Rapids Gold of the NBA G League. He played college basketball for the UNLV Runnin' Rebels and the Oregon Ducks.

== High school career ==
Hardy began his high school career Southfield High School, where he averaged 12 points per game as a freshman. He averaged 19 points per game as a sophomore but was limited to four games because of an MCL injury. Following his sophomore season, Hardy transferred to North Farmington High School. He averaged 21 points, four rebounds, six assists and six steals per game as a junior, helping the team reach the Class A state championship game. On January 20, 2017, Hardy scored 46 points in a 63–58 overtime loss to West Bloomfield High School. As a senior, Hardy averaged 29 points, seven rebounds, six assists and six steals per game, helping the team finish 11–9. He was a finalist for the Mr. Basketball of Michigan award. On December 9, 2016, Hardy initially committed to playing college basketball for Oklahoma State over Georgia, Georgia Tech and Florida. However, he reopened his recruitment after coach Brad Underwood left to take the job at Illinois, and committed to UNLV in April 2017.

== College career ==
Hardy averaged 5 points and 1.6 assists per game as a freshman. As a sophomore, Hardy averaged 13.1 points, 3.5 assists and 3 rebounds per game. On November 9, 2019, he scored a career-high 27 points in a 60–56 overtime loss to Kansas State. Hardy averaged 14.5 points, 3.3 rebounds and 3.3 assists per game as a junior, earning Third Team All-Mountain West Conference honors. He graduated and opted to transfer to Oregon, choosing the Ducks over Arkansas. As a senior, Hardy averaged 3.9 points and 2.2 assists per game. He made 13 starts while Will Richardson recovered from a thumb injury. Following the season, Hardy declared for the 2021 NBA draft and signed with an agent.

== Professional career ==
=== NBA G League Ignite (2021–2022) ===
In September 2021, Hardy signed with the NBA G League Ignite, becoming the first college player to join the team. He was suspended for breaking a team rule at the end of November.

=== Texas Legends (2022–2023) ===
On November 3, 2022, Hardy was named to the opening night roster for the Texas Legends.

=== Maroussi (2023) ===
On October 20, 2023, Hardy signed with Maroussi of the Greek Basket League, but appeared in only one game.

=== Iowa Wolves (2024) ===
On February 5, 2024, Hardy joined the Iowa Wolves.

=== Pioneros de Los Mochis (2024) ===
On May 3, 2024, Hardy signed with the Pioneros de Los Mochis of the Circuito de Baloncesto de la Costa del Pacífico (CIBACOPA).

== Career statistics ==
Legend
GP	Games played	GS	Games started	MPG	Minutes per game
FG%	Field goal percentage	3P%	3-point field goal percentage	FT%	Free throw percentage
RPG	Rebounds per game	APG	Assists per game	SPG	Steals per game
BPG	Blocks per game	PPG	Points per game	**Bold**	Career high

=== College ===
Year	Team	GP	GS	MPG	FG%	3P%	FT%	RPG	APG	SPG	BPG	PPG
2017–18	UNLV	**33**	0	18.9	.405	.294	**.727**	1.5	1.6	.4	**.2**	5.0
2018–19	UNLV	31	19	29.6	**.439**	**.341**	.685	3.0	**3.5**	**.7**	**.2**	13.1
2019–20	UNLV	32	**30**	**34.6**	.409	.333	.697	**3.3**	3.3	**.7**	**.2**	**14.5**
2020–21	Oregon	28	13	19.5	.413	.241	.647	1.3	2.2	.2	.1	3.9
Career		124	62	25.8	.419	.323	.693	2.3	2.7	.5	.2	9.2

== Personal life ==
Hardy's younger brother, Jaden was a second round pick in the 2022 NBA Draft to the Mavericks. His father, Ramsey, competed for Tuskegee at the college level.
