= 2020–21 Mountain West Conference basketball season =

2020–21 Mountain West Conference men's basketball season
- League: NCAA Division I
- Sport: Basketball
- Teams: 11

Regular season

Tournament

Mountain West men's basketball seasons
- ← 2019–20 2021–22 →

2020–21 Mountain West Conference men's basketball standings
	Conf.				Overall
Team	W		L	PCT	W		L	PCT
No. 16 San Diego State†	14	–	3	.824	23	–	5	.821
Utah State	15	–	4	.789	20	–	9	.690
Colorado State	14	–	4	.778	20	–	8	.714
Boise State	14	–	6	.700	19	–	9	.679
Nevada	10	–	7	.588	16	–	10	.615
Fresno State	9	–	11	.450	12	–	12	.500
UNLV	8	–	10	.444	12	–	15	.444
Wyoming	7	–	9	.438	14	–	11	.560
San Jose State	3	–	13	.188	5	–	16	.238
Air Force	3	–	17	.150	5	–	20	.200
New Mexico	2	–	15	.118	6	–	16	.273
† Conference tournament winner Rankings from AP poll

The 2020–21 Mountain West Conference men's basketball season began with practices in October 2020, followed by the start of the 2020–21 NCAA Division I men's basketball season in November. Conference play began in January 2021 and concluded in March 2021.

== Preseason Awards ==
The preseason coaches' poll was announced by the league office on November 10, 2020.

=== Preseason men's basketball coaches poll ===
(First place votes in parentheses)

1. San Diego State (14) 211
2. Boise State (4) 188
3. Utah State (2) 177
4. UNLV 160
5. Colorado State 141
6. Nevada 114
7. New Mexico 106
8. Fresno State 93
9. Wyoming 59
10. Air Force 39
11. San Jose State 32

== Honors ==
Preseason honors were announced by the league office on November 10, 2020.

Honor	Recipient
Preseason Player of the Year	Derrick Alston Jr., Boise State
Preseason All-Mountain West First Team	Derrick Alston Jr., Boise State
Preseason All-Mountain West First Team	Isaiah Stevens, Colorado State
Preseason All-Mountain West First Team	Matt Mitchell, San Diego State
Preseason All-Mountain West First Team	Bryce Hamilton, UNLV
Preseason All-Mountain West First Team	Neemias Queta, Utah State

== Conference matrix ==
	Air Force	Boise State	Colorado State	Fresno State	Nevada	New Mexico	San Diego State	San Jose State	UNLV	Utah State	Wyoming
vs. Air Force	–	2−0	2−0	2−0	1−1	1−1	2−0	2−0	2−0	2–0	1−1
vs. Boise State	0–2	–	1−1	1−1	2−0	0−2	2−0	0−2	0−2	0–2	0−2
vs. Colorado State	0−2	1−1	–	0−2	1−0	0−1	1−1	0−2	0−2	1–1	0−2
vs. Fresno State	0–2	1−1	2−0	–	2−0	0−2	2−0	0−2	1−1	1−0	1–1
vs. Nevada	1–1	0−2	0−1	0−2	–	0−2	2−0	0−0	0−2	2−0	2–0
vs. New Mexico	1−1	2−0	1−0	2−0	2−0	–	2−0	1−1	2−0	2−0	2–0
vs. San Diego State	0−2	0−2	1−1	0−2	0−2	0−2	–	0−2	0−1	2−0	0−2
vs. San Jose State	0−2	2−0	2−0	2−0	0−0	1−1	2−0	–	2−0	2–0	0−0
vs. UNLV	0−2	2−0	2−0	1−1	2−0	0−2	1−0	0−2	–	1–1	0−0
vs. Utah State	0–2	2−0	1−1	0−1	0−2	0−2	0−2	0−2	1−1	–	0–1
vs. Wyoming	1−1	2−0	2−0	1−1	0−2	0−2	2−0	0−0	0−0	1−0	–
Total	3−17	14−6	14−4	9−10	10−7	2−15	14−3	3−13	8−9	14−4	6−9

== All-Mountain West awards ==
=== Mountain West men's basketball weekly awards ===
Week	Player(s) of the Week	School	Newcomer of the Week	School
Nov 30	Matt Mitchell, Sr., F	San Diego State		
Dec 7	Kenny Foster, So., G	Wyoming		
Dec 14	Jordan Schakel, Sr., G	San Diego State		
Dec 21	Desmond Cambridge Jr., Jr., G	Nevada		
Dec 28	Derrick Alston Jr., Sr., G	Boise State		
Jan 5	David Roddy, So., G/F	Colorado State		
Jan 11	Isaiah Stevens, So., G	Colorado State		
Jan 19	Neemias Queta, Jr., C	Utah State		
Jan 25	Marcus Williams, Fr., G	Wyoming		
Feb 1	Ralph Agee, Sr., F	San José State		
Feb 9	Grant Sherfield. So., G	Nevada		
Feb 15	Jordan Schakel, Sr., G	San Diego State		
Feb 22	Derrick Alston Jr., Sr. G	Boise State		
Mar 2	Neemias Queta, Jr., C	Utah State		
Mar 7				
