= 2020–21 New Mexico Lobos men's basketball team =

2019–20 New Mexico lobos men's basketball team

2020–21 New Mexico Lobos men's basketball
- Conference: Mountain West Conference
- Record: 6–16 (2–15 MW)
- Head coach: Paul Weir (4th season)
- Assistant coaches: Dan McHale; Scott Padgett; Ralph Davis

2020–21 Mountain West Conference men's basketball standings
	Conf.				Overall
Team	W		L	PCT	W		L	PCT
No. 16 San Diego State†	14	–	3	.824	23	–	5	.821
Utah State	15	–	4	.789	20	–	9	.690
Colorado State	14	–	4	.778	20	–	8	.714
Boise State	14	–	6	.700	19	–	9	.679
Nevada	10	–	7	.588	16	–	10	.615
Fresno State	9	–	11	.450	12	–	12	.500
UNLV	8	–	10	.444	12	–	15	.444
Wyoming	7	–	9	.438	14	–	11	.560
San Jose State	3	–	13	.188	5	–	16	.238
Air Force	3	–	17	.150	5	–	20	.200
New Mexico	2	–	15	.118	6	–	16	.273
† Conference tournament winner Rankings from AP poll

The 2020–21 New Mexico Lobos men's basketball team represented the University of New Mexico during the 2020–21 NCAA Division I men's basketball season. The Lobos were led by fourth-year head coach Paul Weir and are members of the Mountain West Conference. Due to COVID-19 restrictions within the state of New Mexico, the Lobos did not play any of their home games at their normal home arena The Pit. Their "home" games were played at various different locations outside of the state of New Mexico. They finished the season 6–16, with a 2–15 record in Mountain West play, finishing in last place in the conference. As the No. 11 seed in the Mountain West tournament, they lost in the first round to Fresno State 85–77.

Prior to the end of the season, the school announced that Weir would not return as head coach. On March 16, the school named former Minnesota head coach Richard Pitino the team's new head coach.

== Previous season ==
The Lobos finished the 2019–20 season 19–14, 7–11 in Mountain West play to finish in a tie for seventh place. They defeated San Jose State in the first round of the Mountain West tournament before losing in the quarterfinals to Utah State.

== Roster ==
2020–21 New Mexico Lobos men's basketball team
Players
Coaches

Pos.	#	Name	Height	Weight	Year	Previous school	Hometown
G	0	Isaiah Marin	6 ft 5 in (1.96 m)	190 lb (86 kg)	RS Fr	Buckeye Union HS	Phoenix, AZ
F	1	Bayron Matos	6 ft 9 in (2.06 m)	215 lb (98 kg)	RS Fr	Hamilton Heights Christian Academy	Santo Domingo, Dominican Republic
G	2	Saquan Singleton	6 ft 6 in (1.98 m)	190 lb (86 kg)	Jr	Monsignor Scanlan HS; Hutchinson CC	Bronx, NY
PG	3	Keith McGee	6 ft 3 in (1.91 m)	180 lb (82 kg)	RS Sr	Arcadia HS; South Plains College	Rochester, NY
G	4	Emmanuel Kuac	6 ft 7 in (2.01 m)	200 lb (91 kg)	So	Kearns HS	Calgary, Alberta, Canada
F	5	Rod Brown	6 ft 8 in (2.03 m)	218 lb (99 kg)	RS Jr	Cordova HS; Pearl River CC	Memphis, TN
G/F	10	Makuach Maluach	6 ft 5 in (1.96 m)	190 lb (86 kg)	Sr	Newington College	Sydney, Australia
G	11	Jeremiah Francis III	6 ft 1 in (1.85 m)	205 lb (93 kg)	So	Pickerington Central HS; North Carolina	Columbus, OH
G	12	Daniel Headdings (W)	6 ft 2 in (1.88 m)	185 lb (84 kg)	RS Fr	Wasilla HS	Wasilla, AK
G	13	Javanté Johnson	6 ft 6 in (1.98 m)	190 lb (86 kg)	RS Fr	Cheyenne Mountain HS	Colorado Springs, CO
F	14	Logan Padgett	6 ft 7 in (2.01 m)	210 lb (95 kg)	So	Homewood HS; Samford	Homewood, AL
G	20	Clay Patterson (W)	6 ft 1 in (1.85 m)	180 lb (82 kg)	RS Jr	Rio Rancho HS; Fort Lewis	Rio Rancho, NM
G	21	Nolan Dorsey	6 ft 5 in (1.96 m)	185 lb (84 kg)	Fr	Millbrook HS	Knightdale, NC
F	22	Valdir Manuel	6 ft 10 in (2.08 m)	225 lb (102 kg)	Jr	The Patrick School; Harcum College	Luanda, Angola
G	23	Eloy Medina	6 ft 3 in (1.91 m)	180 lb (82 kg)	Fr	West Mesa HS	Albuquerque, New Mexico
G	30	Kurt Wegscheider (W)	6 ft 4 in (1.93 m)	185 lb (84 kg)	So	NBA Academy Africa	Bangui, Central African Republic
F	33	Jordan Arroyo (W)	6 ft 7 in (2.01 m)	210 lb (95 kg)	Jr	Atrisco Heritage Academy	Albuquerque, NM
F	35	Assane Ndiaye	7 ft 1 in (2.16 m)	240 lb (109 kg)	Jr	Kilgore College	Dakar, Senegal

Head coach

- Paul Weir (York)

Assistant coach(es)

- Dan McHale (Kentucky)
- Scott Padgett (Kentucky)
- Ralph Davis (Texas A&M–Kingsville)

Legend

- (C) Team captain
- (S) Suspended
- (I) Ineligible
- (W) Walk-on
- Injured
- Current redshirt

Roster
Last update: December 30, 2020

== Schedule and results ==
Date time, TV	Rank^{#}	Opponent^{#}	Result	Record	Site (attendance) city, state
Regular season
December 13, 2020*; 1:00 pm, CUSA.TV		at Rice	W 72–61	1–0	Tudor Fieldhouse; Houston, TX
December 15, 2020*; 5:00 pm, YouTube		vs. Our Lady of the Lake	W 104–65	2–0	Tudor Fieldhouse; Houston, TX
December 17, 2020*; 2:30 pm, YouTube		vs. LeTourneau	W 90–58	3–0	Tudor Fieldhouse; Houston, TX
December 21, 2020; 7:30 pm, FS1		at Boise State	L 53–77	3–1 (0–1)	ExtraMile Arena; Boise, ID
December 23, 2020; 7:00 pm, CBSSN		at Boise State	L 52–89	3–2 (0–2)	ExtraMile Arena; Boise, ID
December 31, 2020; 5:00 pm, FS1		vs. Nevada	L 54–68	3–3 (0–3)	Rip Griffin Center; Lubbock, TX
January 2, 2021; 8:00 pm, CBSSN		vs. Nevada	L 74–84	3–4 (0–4)	Rip Griffin Center; Lubbock, TX
January 6, 2021; 8:00 pm, CBSSN		vs. Utah State	L 45–77	3–5 (0–5)	Rip Griffin Center; Lubbock, TX
January 8, 2021; 9:00 pm, FS1		vs. Utah State	L 42–86	3–6 (0–6)	Rip Griffin Center; Lubbock, TX
January 13, 2021*; 7:00 pm		at Dixie State	W 72–63	4–6	Burns Arena (771); St. George, UT
January 16, 2021; 2:30 pm, CBSSN		at UNLV	L 54–77	4–7 (0–7)	Thomas & Mack Center; Paradise, NV
January 18, 2021; 7:30 pm, FS1		at UNLV	L 46–53	4–8 (0–8)	Thomas & Mack Center; Paradise, NV
January 21, 2021; 1:00 pm, MWN		vs. San Jose State	W 67–51	5–8 (1–8)	Burns Arena; St. George, UT
January 23, 2021; 12:00 pm, MWN		vs. San Jose State	L 71–83	5–9 (1–9)	Burns Arena; St. George, UT
January 28, 2021; 9:00 pm, CBSSN		at Fresno State	L 62–64 ^{OT}	5–10 (1–10)	Save Mart Center; Fresno, CA
January 30, 2021; 5:00 pm, MWN		at Fresno State	L 55–65	5–11 (1–11)	Save Mart Center; Fresno, CA
February 3, 2021; 9:00 pm, FS1		vs. San Diego State	Canceled		Rip Griffin Center; Lubbock, TX
February 5, 2021; 7:00 pm, CBSSN		vs. San Diego State	Canceled		Rip Griffin Center; Lubbock, TX
February 9, 2021; 9:00 pm, FS1		at Colorado State	Canceled		Moby Arena; Fort Collins, CO
February 11, 2021; 6:00 pm, CBSSN		at Colorado State	Canceled		Moby Arena; Fort Collins, CO
February 17, 2021; 6:00 pm, MWN		vs. Wyoming	L 74–83 ^{OT}	5–12 (1–12)	Clune Arena; Colorado Springs, CO
February 19, 2021; 7:00 pm, CBSSN		vs. Wyoming	L 67–79	5–13 (1–13)	Clune Arena; Colorado Springs, CO
February 22, 2021; 7:30 pm, CBSSN		at Air Force	W 73–65	6–13 (2–13)	Clune Arena; Colorado Springs, CO
February 24, 2021; 4:00 pm, MWN		at Air Force	L 55–62	6–14 (2–14)	Clune Arena; Colorado Springs, CO
March 3, 2021; 6:00 pm		at Colorado State	L 73–87	6–15 (2–15)	Moby Arena; Fort Collins, CO
Mountain West tournament
March 10, 2021; 4:00 pm, Stadium	(11)	vs. (6) Fresno State; First round	L 77–85	6–16	Thomas & Mack Center; Paradise, NV
*Non-conference game. ^{#}Rankings from AP Poll. (#) Tournament seedings in parentheses. All times are in Mountain Time.
