= Suzette Sargeant =

American basketball player and coach

Personal information
- Born: c.1970
- Listed height: 6 ft 1 in (1.85 m)

Career information
- High school: Orange (Orange, California)
- College: Central Arizona (1988–1990); Auburn (1990–1992)
- Playing career: 1995–2003
- Position: Guard / forward

Career history

Playing
- 1995–1996: Njarðvík
- 1996–1997: Forssan Koripojat

Coaching
- 1995–1996: Njarðvík

Career highlights
- As player: Korisliiga scoring leader (1996); NJCAA champion (1989); Kodak All-American team (1990); As coach: Úrvalsdeild Coach of the Year (1995)

Suzette Sargeant is an American former basketball coach and player. After graduating from Auburn University in 1992, she went on to play professionally in Portugal, Italy, Israel, Finland and Iceland.

== Early career ==
Sargeant played high school basketball for Orange High School in Orange, California where she averaged 22.7 points and 12.5 rebounds as a senior. In 1989 she was a member of the Central Arizona College team that won the NJCAA Division I Women's Basketball Championship. After two seasons at Arizona, she transferred to Auburn University in 1990 and played for the Auburn Tigers women's basketball until 1992. During her senior season, she started all 29 games and averaged 13.8 points and 4.4 rebounds per game.

== Career ==
She started her professional career as a player-coach with Njarðvík in the Icelandic Úrvalsdeild kvenna during the 1995–96 season. For the season she averaged 19.3 points and 10.3 rebounds per game. In the Icelandic Cup, she led Njarðvík to the Cup Finals where the team lost to rivals Keflavík. After the season she was named the Úrvalsdeild Coach of the Year.

The following season, Sargeant signed with Forssan Koripojat of the Finnish Naisten Korisliiga where she went on to average a league leading 25.8 points along with 11.8 rebounds per game.

== Career statistics ==
=== College ===
Year	Team	GP	GS	MPG	FG%	3P%	FT%	RPG	APG	SPG	BPG	TO	PPG
1990–91	Auburn	27	-	-	42.5	25.0	72.9	2.1	0.7	0.6	0.5	-	4.9
1991–92	Auburn	29	-	-	40.1	39.6	79.3	4.4	1.8	1.9	0.8	-	13.8
Career		56	-	-	40.7	38.8	77.0	3.3	1.3	1.3	0.7	-	9.5
Statistics retrieved from Sports-Reference.
