= 2020–21 San Diego State Aztecs men's basketball team =

American college basketball season

2020–21 San Diego State Aztecs men's basketball

Mountain West regular season champions Mountain West tournament champions

NCAA tournament, first round
- Conference: Mountain West Conference

Ranking
- AP: No. 16
- Record: 23–5 (14–3 MW)
- Head coach: Brian Dutcher (4th season)
- Assistant coaches: Dave Velasquez; Chris Acker; Jay Morris
- Offensive scheme: Wheel
- Base defense: Pack-Line
- Home arena: Viejas Arena (Capacity: 12,414)

2020–21 Mountain West Conference men's basketball standings
	Conf.				Overall
Team	W		L	PCT	W		L	PCT
No. 16 San Diego State†	14	–	3	.824	23	–	5	.821
Utah State	15	–	4	.789	20	–	9	.690
Colorado State	14	–	4	.778	20	–	8	.714
Boise State	14	–	6	.700	19	–	9	.679
Nevada	10	–	7	.588	16	–	10	.615
Fresno State	9	–	11	.450	12	–	12	.500
UNLV	8	–	10	.444	12	–	15	.444
Wyoming	7	–	9	.438	14	–	11	.560
San Jose State	3	–	13	.188	5	–	16	.238
Air Force	3	–	17	.150	5	–	20	.200
New Mexico	2	–	15	.118	6	–	16	.273
† Conference tournament winner Rankings from AP poll

The 2020–21 San Diego State Aztecs men's basketball team represented San Diego State University during the 2020–21 NCAA Division I men's basketball season. The Aztecs, led by fourth-year head coach Brian Dutcher, played their home games at Viejas Arena as members in the Mountain West Conference. The Aztecs finished the season 23–5, 14–3 in Mountain West play to win the regular season championship. In the Mountain West tournament, they defeated Wyoming, Nevada, and Utah State to win the tournament championship. As a result, they received the conference's automatic bid to the NCAA tournament as the No. 6 seed in the Midwest region. There they lost in the first round to Syracuse.

== Previous season ==
The Aztecs finished the 2019–20 season 30–2, 17–1 in Mountain West play to be regular season Mountain West champions. They defeated Air Force and Boise State to reach the championship game of the Mountain West tournament where they lost to Utah State. Although they were a virtual lock to receive an at-large bid to the NCAA tournament, on March 12 the NCAA Tournament was cancelled amid the COVID-19 pandemic.

=== 2020 recruiting class ===
College recruiting information
Name	Hometown	School	Height	Weight	Commit date
Lamont Butler; PG	Riverside, CA	Riverside Polytech High School	5 ft 10 in (1.78 m)	175 lb (79 kg)	Jun 19, 2019
Lamont Butler; PG	Recruit ratings: Scout: Rivals: 247Sports: ESPN: (80)				
Che Evans; SF	Baltimore, MD	Dulaney High School	6 ft 5 in (1.96 m)	205 lb (93 kg)	Sep 12, 2019
Che Evans; SF	Recruit ratings: Scout: Rivals: 247Sports: ESPN: (79)				
Keith Dinwiddie; SG	Culver City, CA	Fairfax High School	6 ft 2 in (1.88 m)	175 lb (79 kg)	Sep 10, 2019
Keith Dinwiddie; SG	Recruit ratings: Scout: Rivals: 247Sports: ESPN: (NR)				
Overall recruit ranking:
Note: In many cases, Scout, Rivals, 247Sports, On3, and ESPN may conflict in their listings of height and weight.; In these cases, the average was taken. ESPN grades are on a 100-point scale.; Sources: "2020 San Diego St. Basketball Commitment List". Rivals.; "2020 San Diego St. Player Commits". ESPN.; "2020 Team Ranking". Rivals.

== Roster ==
2020–21 San Diego State Aztecs men's basketball team
Players
Coaches

Pos.	#	Name	Height	Weight	Year	Previous school	Hometown
F	0	Keshad Johnson	6 ft 7 in (2.01 m)	210 lb (95 kg)	So	San Leandro HS	Oakland, California
G	2	Adam Seiko	6 ft 3 in (1.91 m)	210 lb (95 kg)	RS Jr	Sierra Canyon HS	Boston, Massachusetts
G	3	Terrell Gomez	5 ft 8 in (1.73 m)	165 lb (75 kg)	Sr	Inglewood HS; CSUN	Los Angeles, California
G	4	Trey Pulliam	6 ft 3 in (1.91 m)	180 lb (82 kg)	Sr	A&M Consolidated HS; Navarro College	Bryan, Texas
G	5	Lamont Butler	6 ft 0 in (1.83 m)	200 lb (91 kg)	Fr	Riverside Poly HS	Moreno Valley, California
G	10	Keith Dinwiddie Jr.	6 ft 0 in (1.83 m)	185 lb (84 kg)	Fr	Fairfax HS	Los Angeles, California
F	11	Matt Mitchell	6 ft 6 in (1.98 m)	235 lb (107 kg)	Sr	Roosevelt HS	Riverside, California
F	12	Che Evans	6 ft 5 in (1.96 m)	210 lb (95 kg)	Fr	Saint Maria Goretti HS	Philadelphia, Pennsylvania
F	14	Cade Alger	6 ft 9 in (2.06 m)	190 lb (86 kg)	RS Fr	Ripon Christian HS; Seattle	Ripon, California
G	20	Jordan Schakel	6 ft 6 in (1.98 m)	200 lb (91 kg)	Sr	Bishop Montgomery HS	Torrance, California
G	21	Jared Barnett	6 ft 1 in (1.85 m)	145 lb (66 kg)	So	Westchester HS	Los Angeles, California
F	23	Joshua Tomaić	6 ft 9 in (2.06 m)	230 lb (104 kg)	Sr	Canarias Basketball Academy; Maryland	Lanzarote, Spain
G	24	Tyler Broughton	6 ft 4 in (1.93 m)	190 lb (86 kg)	Fr	Tesoro HS	Ladera Ranch, California
F	31	Nathan Mensah	6 ft 10 in (2.08 m)	230 lb (104 kg)	Jr	Findlay Prep	Accra, Ghana
G	32	Derek Morhar	6 ft 5 in (1.96 m)	165 lb (75 kg)	Fr	Calabasas HS	Calabasas, California
F	33	Aguek Arop	6 ft 6 in (1.98 m)	220 lb (100 kg)	Jr	Omaha South HS	Omaha, Nebraska
G	42	Triston Broughton	6 ft 4 in (1.93 m)	190 lb (86 kg)	Fr	Tesoro HS	Ladera Ranch, California

Head coach

- Brian Dutcher (Minnesota)

Assistant coach(es)

- Dave Velasquez (San Diego State)
- Chris Acker (Chaminade)
- Jay Morris (Cal State Dominguez Hills)

Legend

- (C) Team captain
- (S) Suspended
- (I) Ineligible
- (W) Walk-on
- Injured
- Current redshirt

Roster
Last update: November 19, 2020

== Schedule and results ==
Date time, TV	Rank^{#}	Opponent^{#}	Result	Record	High points	High rebounds	High assists	Site (attendance) city, state
Regular season
November 25, 2020*; 8:00 pm, CBSSN		No. 22 UCLA	W 73–58	1–0	15 – Tied	7 – Mensah	6 – Pulliam	Viejas Arena; San Diego, CA
November 27, 2020*; 4:00 pm, Yurview		UC Irvine	W 77–58	2–0	14 – Johnson	7 – Arop	3 – Tomaic	Viejas Arena; San Diego, CA
December 2, 2020*; 6:00 pm		Saint Katherine	W 83–41	3–0	16 – Schakel	7 – Mensah	4 – Pulliam	Viejas Arena; San Diego, CA
December 6, 2020*; 1:30 pm, Yurview		Pepperdine	W 65–60	4–0	17 – Schakel	6 – Mensah	3 – Tied	Viejas Arena; San Diego, CA
December 10, 2020*; 7:00 pm, FS1	No. 24	at No. 23 Arizona State	W 80–68	5–0	25 – Schakel	15 – Mensah	4 – Gomez	Desert Financial Arena; Tempe, AZ
December 18, 2020*; 2:00 pm, CBSSN	No. 18	BYU	L 62–72	5–1	35 – Mitchell	4 – Tied	5 – Pulliam	Viejas Arena; San Diego, CA
December 22, 2020*; 6:00 pm, CBSSN		vs. Saint Mary's	W 74–49	6–1	18 – Mensah	13 – Mensah	4 – Gomez	Robert A. Mott Athletics Center; San Luis Obispo, CA
January 2, 2021; 1:00 pm, CBS		Colorado State	L 67–70	6–2 (0–1)	19 – Gomez	7 – Mitchell	6 – Pulliam	Viejas Arena; San Diego, CA
January 4, 2021; 6:00 pm, FS1		Colorado State	W 78–65	7–2 (1–1)	28 – Schakel	9 – Schakel	5 – Pulliam	Viejas Arena; San Diego, CA
January 7, 2021; 7:00 pm, CBSSN		Nevada	W 65–60	8–2 (2–1)	20 – Mitchell	10 – Mitchell	3 – Tied	Viejas Arena; San Diego, CA
January 9, 2021; 5:00 pm, CBSSN		Nevada	W 69–67	9–2 (3–1)	20 – Mitchell	8 – Mitchell	3 – Tied	Viejas Arena; San Diego, CA
January 14, 2021; 6:00 pm, CBSSN		at Utah State	L 45–57	9–3 (3–2)	13 – Mensah	9 – Mensah	2 – Tied	Smith Spectrum (1,585); Logan, UT
January 16, 2021; 10:30 am, CBS		at Utah State	L 59–64	9–4 (3–3)	16 – Gomez	5 – Tied	2 – Pulliam	Smith Spectrum (1,638); Logan, UT
January 22, 2021; 6:00 pm, FS1		at Air Force	W 98–61	10–4 (4–3)	18 – Schakel	7 – Mensah	6 – Pulliam	Clune Arena; Colorado Springs, CO
January 24, 2021; 7:00 pm, FS1		at Air Force	W 91–59	11–4 (5–3)	24 – Schakel	7 – Tied	6 – Gomez	Clune Arena; Colorado Springs, CO
January 28, 2021; 6:00 pm, FS1		Wyoming	W 87–57	12–4 (6–3)	16 – Schakel	7 – Tomaic	4 – Schakel	Viejas Arena; San Diego, CA
January 30, 2021; 7:00 pm, CBSSN		Wyoming	W 98–71	13–4 (7–3)	26 – Mitchell	5 – Tied	4 – Tied	Viejas Arena; San Diego, CA
February 3, 2021; 8:00 pm, FS1		vs. New Mexico	Canceled, ruled a forfeit by New Mexico					Rip Griffin Center; Lubbock, TX
February 5, 2021; 6:00 pm, CBSSN		vs. New Mexico	Canceled, ruled a forfeit by New Mexico					Rip Griffin Center; Lubbock, TX
February 8, 2021; 8:00 pm, FS1		San Jose State	W 85–54	14–4 (8–3)	23 – Schakel	13 – Johnson	5 – Pulliam	Viejas Arena; San Diego, CA
February 10, 2021; 8:00 pm, CBSSN		San Jose State	W 77–55	15–4 (9–3)	24 – Schakel	7 – Mitchell	5 – Pulliam	Viejas Arena; San Diego, CA
February 18, 2021; 7:00 pm, CBSSN	No. 25	at Fresno State	W 67–53	16–4 (10–3)	19 – Mitchell	8 – Mensah	3 – Tied	Save Mart Center; Fresno, CA
February 20, 2021; 4:30 pm, CBSSN	No. 25	at Fresno State	W 75–57	17–4 (11–3)	14 – Schakel	8 – Schakel	2 – Tied	Save Mart Center; Fresno, CA
February 25, 2021; 6:00 pm, FS1	No. 22	Boise State	W 78–66 ^{OT}	18–4 (12–3)	24 – Mitchell	9 – Mitchell	3 – Gomez	Viejas Arena; San Diego, CA
February 27, 2021; 1:00 pm, CBSSN	No. 22	Boise State	W 62–58	19–4 (13–3)	17 – Schakel	8 – Mitchell	4 – Pulliam	Viejas Arena; San Diego, CA
March 3, 2021; 6:00 pm, CBSSN	No. 19	UNLV	W 71–62	20–4 (14–3)	19 – Mitchell	9 – Schakel	8 – Pulliam	Thomas & Mack Center (50); Paradise, NV
Mountain West tournament
March 11, 2021; 12:00 pm, CBSSN	(1) No. 19	vs. (8) Wyoming; Quarterfinals	W 69–66	21–4	20 – Gomez	6 – Schakel	4 – Pulliam	Thomas & Mack Center; Paradise, NV
March 12, 2021; 6:30 pm, CBSSN	(1) No. 19	vs. (5) Nevada; Semifinals	W 77–70	22–4	24 – Mitchell	9 – Schakel	4 – Pulliam	Thomas & Mack Center; Paradise, NV
March 13, 2021; 3:00 pm, CBS	(1) No. 19	vs. (2) Utah State; Championship	W 68–57	23–4	14 – Mitchell	8 – Mensah	3 – Pulliam	Thomas & Mack Center; Paradise, NV
NCAA tournament
March 19, 2021; 6:40 pm, CBS	(6 MW) No. 16	vs. (11 MW) Syracuse; First Round	L 62–78	23–5	17 – Tied	8 – Mitchell	6 – Pulliam	Hinkle Fieldhouse; Indianapolis, IN
*Non-conference game. ^{#}Rankings from AP Poll. (#) Tournament seedings in parentheses. MW=Midwest. All times are in Pacific Time.

== Rankings ==
Ranking movements Legend: ██ Increase in ranking ██ Decrease in ranking — = Not ranked RV = Received votes т = Tied with team above or below
	Week																		
Poll	Pre	1	2	3	4	5	6	7	8	9	10	11	12	13	14	15	16	17	Final
AP	RV	RV	24	18	RV	RV	RV	RV	—	—	—	RV	25	22	22	19	16	16	Not Released
Coaches	RV	RV*	RV	20	RV	23	RV	RV	—	—	—	RV	RV	25	21	19т	18	18	RV

*AP does not release post-NCAA Tournament rankings. No coaches poll for Week 1.
