= 2020–21 Nevada Wolf Pack men's basketball team =

American college basketball season

2020–21 Nevada Wolf Pack men's basketball
- Conference: Mountain West Conference
- Record: 16–10 (10–7 MW)
- Head coach: Steve Alford (2nd season)
- Associate head coach: Craig Neal (2nd season)
- Assistant coaches: Kory Barnett (2nd season); Bill Duany (2nd season)
- Home arena: Lawlor Events Center

2020–21 Mountain West Conference men's basketball standings
	Conf.				Overall
Team	W		L	PCT	W		L	PCT
No. 16 San Diego State†	14	–	3	.824	23	–	5	.821
Utah State	15	–	4	.789	20	–	9	.690
Colorado State	14	–	4	.778	20	–	8	.714
Boise State	14	–	6	.700	19	–	9	.679
Nevada	10	–	7	.588	16	–	10	.615
Fresno State	9	–	11	.450	12	–	12	.500
UNLV	8	–	10	.444	12	–	15	.444
Wyoming	7	–	9	.438	14	–	11	.560
San Jose State	3	–	13	.188	5	–	16	.238
Air Force	3	–	17	.150	5	–	20	.200
New Mexico	2	–	15	.118	6	–	16	.273
† Conference tournament winner Rankings from AP poll

The 2020–21 Nevada Wolf Pack men's basketball team represented the University of Nevada, Reno during the 2020–21 NCAA Division I men's basketball season. The Wolf Pack, led by second-year head coach Steve Alford, played their home games at the Lawlor Events Center on their campus in Reno, Nevada as members of the Mountain West Conference (MW).

== Previous season ==
The Wolf Pack finished the season 19–12, 12–6 in Mountain West play to finish in a three-way tie for second place. They lost in the quarterfinals of the Mountain West tournament to Wyoming.

== Roster ==
2020–21 Nevada Wolf Pack men's basketball team
Players
Coaches

Pos.	#	Name	Height	Weight	Year	Previous school	Hometown
F	1	Robby Robinson	6 ft 8 in (2.03 m)	225 lb (102 kg)	RS Jr	Kearny High HS; San Diego City College	San Diego, CA
G	2	Addison Patterson (redshirt)	6 ft 6 in (1.98 m)	195 lb (88 kg)	So	Bella Vista College Prep; Oregon	Milton, ON
G	3	Alem Huseinovic	6 ft 4 in (1.93 m)	190 lb (86 kg)	Fr	PHHoenix Prep	Zenica, Bosnia and Herzegovina
G	4	Desmond Cambridge Jr.	6 ft 4 in (1.93 m)	180 lb (82 kg)	RS Jr	The Hun School; Brown	Nashville, TN
F	5	Warren Washington	7 ft 0 in (2.13 m)	215 lb (98 kg)	RS So	Mission Hills HS; Oregon State	San Marcos, CA
G	10	Gabe Bansuelo (W)	6 ft 1 in (1.85 m)	165 lb (75 kg)	So	Bishop Manogue HS	Reno, NV
G	11	Kane Milling (W)	6 ft 4 in (1.93 m)	180 lb (82 kg)	So	CSP Limoges	Nantes, France
G	13	Khristion Courseault (W)	6 ft 2 in (1.88 m)	180 lb (82 kg)	RS So	Loyola HS; Pasadena City College	Los Angeles, CA
F	14	Tré Coleman	6 ft 7 in (2.01 m)	185 lb (84 kg)	Fr	Jeffersonville HS	Jeffersonville, IN
F	15	Zane Meeks	6 ft 9 in (2.06 m)	215 lb (98 kg)	So	Brewster Academy	Prairie Village, KS
G	20	Daniel Foster	6 ft 6 in (1.98 m)	185 lb (84 kg)	Fr	Golden State Prep	Melbourne, Australia
F	23	DeAndre Henry	6 ft 7 in (2.01 m)	225 lb (102 kg)	Fr	PHHoenix Prep	Phoenix, AZ
G	25	Grant Sherfield	6 ft 2 in (1.88 m)	189 lb (86 kg)	So	Sunrise Christian Academy; Wichita State	Fort Worth, TX
F	42	K. J. Hymes Jr.	6 ft 10 in (2.08 m)	210 lb (95 kg)	RS So	Hillcrest Prep	Phoenix, AZ
F	44	Zachary Williams (W)	6 ft 7 in (2.01 m)	205 lb (93 kg)	Sr	Galena HS; South Mountain CC	Reno, NV
C	50	Will Baker (redshirt)	6 ft 11 in (2.11 m)	245 lb (111 kg)	So	Westlake HS; Texas	Austin, TX

Head coach

- Steve Alford (Indiana)

Assistant coach(es)

- Craig Neal (Georgia Tech)
- Kory Barnett (Indiana)
- Bill Duany (Indiana)

Legend

- (C) Team captain
- (S) Suspended
- (I) Ineligible
- (W) Walk-on
- Injured
- Current redshirt

Roster
Last update: November 22, 2020

== Schedule and results ==
Date time, TV	Rank^{#}	Opponent^{#}	Result	Record	Site city, state
Regular season
November 25, 2020*; 12:00 pm		vs. North Dakota State; Golden Window Classic	W 62–48	1–0	Pinnacle Bank Arena; Lincoln, NE
November 26, 2020*; 11:00 am, BTN		at Nebraska; Golden Window Classic	W 69–66	2–0	Pinnacle Bank Arena; Lincoln, NE
November 30, 2020*; 6:30 pm		Pacific	W 70–58	3–0	Lawlor Events Center; Reno, NV
December 2, 2020*; 6:00 pm		San Francisco	L 60–85	3–1	Lawlor Events Center; Reno, NV
December 7, 2020*; 4:00 pm		William Jessup	W 86–64	4–1	Lawlor Events Center; Reno, NV
December 11, 2020*; 6:00 pm, ESPN3		at Grand Canyon	L 77–87	4–2	GCU Arena (328); Phoenix, AZ
December 14, 2020*; 6:00 pm		at San Diego	W 79–72	5–2	Jenny Craig Pavilion; San Diego, CA
December 18, 2020; 7:00 pm		Air Force	W 74–57	6–2 (1–0)	Lawlor Events Center; Reno, NV
December 20, 2020; 3:00 pm		Air Force	L 66–68	6–3 (1–1)	Lawlor Events Center; Reno, NV
December 31, 2020; 6:00 pm, FS1		vs. New Mexico	W 68–54	7–3 (2–1)	Rip Griffin Center; Lubbock, TX
January 2, 2021; 7:00 pm, CBSSN		vs. New Mexico	W 84–74	8–3 (3–1)	Rip Griffin Center; Lubbock, TX
January 7, 2021; 7:00 pm, CBSSN		at San Diego State	L 60–65	8–4 (3–2)	Viejas Arena; San Diego, CA
January 9, 2021; 5:00 pm, CBSSN		at San Diego State	L 67–69	8–5 (3–3)	Viejas Arena; San Diego, CA
January 15, 2021; 8:00 pm, FS1		Fresno State	W 73–57	9–5 (4–3)	Lawlor Events Center (50); Reno, NV
January 17, 2021; 1:00 pm, CBSSN		Fresno State	W 79–65	10–5 (5–3)	Lawlor Events Center (50); Reno, NV
January 22, 2021; 5:00 pm, Stadium		at Wyoming	L 64–71	10–6 (5–4)	Arena-Auditorium; Laramie, WY
January 24, 2021; 1:00 pm, CBSSN		at Wyoming	L 88–93	10–7 (5–5)	Arena-Auditorium; Laramie, WY
January 31, 2021; 6:30 pm, FS1		UNLV	W 89–60	11–7 (6–5)	Lawlor Events Center (50); Reno, NV
February 2, 2021; 6:00 pm, CBSSN		UNLV	W 72–62	12–7 (7–5)	Lawlor Events Center (50); Reno, NV
February 5, 2021; 6:00 pm, FS1		Boise State	W 74–72	13–7 (8–5)	Lawlor Events Center (50); Reno, NV
February 7, 2021; 1:00 pm, FS1		Boise State	W 73–62	14–7 (9–5)	Lawlor Events Center (50); Reno, NV
February 13, 2021; 1:00 pm		at San Jose State	Canceled		Provident Credit Union Event Center; San Jose, CA
February 15, 2021; 5:00 pm, Stadium		at San Jose State	Canceled		Provident Credit Union Event Center; San Jose, CA
February 20, 2021; FS1		Colorado State	Canceled		Lawlor Events Center; Reno, NV
February 21, 2021; CBSSN		Colorado State	Canceled		Lawlor Events Center; Reno, NV
February 25, 2021; 7:00 pm, FS1		at Utah State	L 72–75	14–8 (9–6)	Smith Spectrum; Logan, UT
February 27, 2021; 5:00 pm, FS1		at Utah State	L 66–87	14–9 (9–7)	Smith Spectrum; Logan, UT
March 5, 2021; 7:00 pm, CBSSN		Colorado State	W 85–82	15–9 (10–7)	Lawlor Events Center (100); Reno, NV
Mountain West tournament
March 11, 2021; 2:30 pm, CBSSN	(5)	vs. (4) Boise State; Quarterfinals	W 89–82	16–9	Thomas & Mack Center; Paradise, NV
March 12, 2021; 6:30 pm, CBSSN	(5)	vs. (1) No. 19 San Diego State; Semifinals	L 70–77	16–10	Thomas & Mack Center; Paradise, NV
*Non-conference game. (#) Tournament seedings in parentheses. All times are in Pacific Time.
