= 2020–21 Utah State Aggies men's basketball team =

American college basketball season

2020–21 Utah State Aggies men's basketball

NCAA tournament, first round
- Conference: Mountain West Conference
- Record: 20–9 (15–4 MW)
- Head coach: Craig Smith (3rd season)
- Assistant coaches: Austin Hansen; Eric Peterson; David Ragland
- Home arena: Smith Spectrum

2020–21 Mountain West Conference men's basketball standings
	Conf.				Overall
Team	W		L	PCT	W		L	PCT
No. 16 San Diego State†	14	–	3	.824	23	–	5	.821
Utah State	15	–	4	.789	20	–	9	.690
Colorado State	14	–	4	.778	20	–	8	.714
Boise State	14	–	6	.700	19	–	9	.679
Nevada	10	–	7	.588	16	–	10	.615
Fresno State	9	–	11	.450	12	–	12	.500
UNLV	8	–	10	.444	12	–	15	.444
Wyoming	7	–	9	.438	14	–	11	.560
San Jose State	3	–	13	.188	5	–	16	.238
Air Force	3	–	17	.150	5	–	20	.200
New Mexico	2	–	15	.118	6	–	16	.273
† Conference tournament winner Rankings from AP poll

The 2020–21 Utah State Aggies men's basketball team represented Utah State University in the 2020–21 NCAA Division I men's basketball season. The Aggies, led by third-year head coach Craig Smith, played their home games at the Smith Spectrum in Logan, Utah as members of the Mountain West Conference. They finished the season 20–9, 15–4 in Mountain West play to finish in second place. In the Mountain West tournament, they defeated UNLV and Colorado State before losing to San Diego State in the championship game. They received an at-large bid to the NCAA tournament as the No. 11 seed in the South region, where they lost to Texas Tech in the first round.

Following the season, Smith left the school to accept the head-coaching position at Utah. Shortly thereafter, the school named UMBC head coach Ryan Odom the team's new head coach.

== Previous season ==
The Aggies finished the 2019–20 season 26–8, 12–6 in Mountain West play to finish in a three-way tie for second place. They defeated New Mexico, Wyoming and San Diego State to become champions of the Mountain West tournament, their second consecutive Mountain West tournament championship. As a result, they received the conference's automatic bid to the NCAA tournament. However, on March 12, 2021, the NCAA Tournament was canceled due to the ongoing COVID-19 pandemic.

== Roster ==
2020–21 Utah State Aggies men's basketball team
Players
Coaches

Pos.	#	Name	Height	Weight	Year	Previous school	Hometown
G	2	Sean Bairstow	6 ft 8 in (2.03 m)	190 lb (86 kg)	So	Churchie	Brisbane, QLD
G	3	Steven Ashworth	6 ft 1 in (1.85 m)	170 lb (77 kg)	Fr	Lone Peak HS	Alpine, UT
F	10	Alphonso Anderson	6 ft 6 in (1.98 m)	220 lb (100 kg)	Sr	Garfield HS; North Idaho College	Tacoma, WA
F	11	Max Shulga	6 ft 4 in (1.93 m)	197 lb (89 kg)	Fr	Basketball School of Excellence	Kyiv, Ukraine
C	12	Szymon Zapala	6 ft 11 in (2.11 m)	240 lb (109 kg)	Fr	SMS PZkosz Wladyslawowo	Zaborze, Poland
F	13	Liam McChesney	6 ft 10 in (2.08 m)	185 lb (84 kg)	RS Fr	Charles Hays	Prince Rupert, BC
G	21	Karson Stastny	6 ft 4 in (1.93 m)	175 lb (79 kg)	RS Fr	Celina HS	Celina, TX
G	22	Brock Miller	6 ft 5 in (1.96 m)	200 lb (91 kg)	RS Jr	Brighton HS	Sandy, UT
C	23	Neemias Queta	7 ft 0 in (2.13 m)	245 lb (111 kg)	Jr	Benfica	Barreiro, Portugal
G	24	Rollie Worster	6 ft 3 in (1.91 m)	200 lb (91 kg)	RS Fr	Hellgate HS	Missoula, MT
G	30	Zahar Vedischev	6 ft 6 in (1.98 m)	180 lb (82 kg)	RS Fr	PBC Lokomotiv Kuban	Moscow, Russia
C	32	Trevin Dorius	7 ft 0 in (2.13 m)	240 lb (109 kg)	RS So	Wasatch HS	Heber City, UT
F	34	Justin Bean	6 ft 7 in (2.01 m)	210 lb (95 kg)	RS Jr	Southmoore HS	Moore, OK
F	35	Matthew Wickizer	6 ft 9 in (2.06 m)	210 lb (95 kg)	Fr	Kearns HS	North Salt Lake, UT
G	44	Marco Anthony	6 ft 5 in (1.96 m)	225 lb (102 kg)	RS Jr	Holmes HS; Virginia	San Antonio, TX
C	52	Kuba Karwowski	7 ft 2 in (2.18 m)	220 lb (100 kg)	Jr	North Platte CC	Warsaw, Poland

Head coach

- Craig Smith (North Dakota)

Assistant coach(es)

- Austin Hansen (South Dakota State)
- Eric Peterson (UW–La Crosse)
- David Ragland (Southern Indiana)

Legend

- (C) Team captain
- (S) Suspended
- (I) Ineligible
- (W) Walk-on
- Injured
- Current redshirt

Roster

== Schedule and results ==
Date time, TV	Rank^{#}	Opponent^{#}	Result	Record	High points	High rebounds	High assists	Site (attendance) city, state
Regular season
Nov 25, 2020*; 7:30 pm, ESPN2		vs. VCU; Crossover Classic querterfinals	L 69–85	0–1	17 – Queta	10 – Queta	3 – Bean	Sanford Pentagon; Sioux Falls, SD
Nov 26, 2020*; 5:30 pm, ESPN2		vs. South Dakota State; Crossover Classic consolation 2nd round	L 59–83	0–2	12 – Queta	8 – Queta	3 – Tied	Sanford Pentagon; Sioux Falls, SD
Nov 27, 2020*; 2:00 pm, ESPNU		vs. Northern Iowa; Crossover Classic 7th place game	W 82–71	1–2	22 – Anthony	10 – Tied	4 – Bean	Sanford Pentagon; Sioux Falls, SD
Dec 5, 2020*; 7:00 pm, MWN		BYU	L 64–67	1–3	18 – Queta	13 – Bean	5 – Worster	Smith Spectrum (1,628); Logan, UT
Dec 8, 2020*; 7:00 pm		College of Idaho	W 90–64	2–3	21 – Bean	8 – Queta	7 – Ashworth	Smith Spectrum (1,324); Logan, UT
Dec 12, 2020*; 2:00 pm, KJZZ		at Weber State	Canceled due to COVID-19 issues					Dee Events Center; Ogden, UT
Dec 15, 2020*; 7:00 pm		Dixie State	Canceled due to COVID-19 issues					Smith Spectrum; Logan, UT
Dec 18, 2020*; 7:00 pm		Northern Colorado	W 63–50	3–3	19 – Anthony	11 – Bean	4 – Worster	Smith Spectrum (1,376); Logan, UT
Dec 21, 2020; 7:00 pm		San Jose State	W 107–62	4–3 (1–0)	16 – Bean	11 – Bean	7 – Worster	Smith Spectrum (1,354); Logan, UT
Dec 23, 2020; 7:00 pm		San Jose State	W 85–52	5–3 (2–0)	15 – Worster	12 – Bean	4 – Tied	Smith Spectrum (1,151); Logan, UT
Dec 31, 2020; 1:00 pm, CBSSN		at Air Force	W 83–48	6–3 (3–0)	15 – Bean	5 – Tied	6 – Anthony	Clune Arena; Colorado Springs, CO
Jan 2, 2021; 4:00 pm, Stadium		at Air Force	W 72–53	7–3 (4–0)	15 – Tied	11 – Queta	6 – Queta	Clune Arena; Colorado Springs, CO
Jan 6, 2021; 8:00 pm, CBSSN		vs. New Mexico	W 77–45	8–3 (5–0)	18 – Queta	6 – 3 tied	4 – Bean	Rip Griffin Center; Lubbock, TX
Jan 8, 2021; 9:00 pm, FS1		vs. New Mexico	W 82–46	9–3 (6–0)	13 – Bean	13 – Tied	5 – Ashworth	Rip Griffin Center; Lubbock, TX
Jan 14, 2021; 7:00 pm, CBSSN		San Diego State	W 57–45	10–3 (7–0)	16 – Miller	16 – Queta	3 – Tied	Smith Spectrum (1,585); Logan, UT
Jan 16, 2021; 10:30 am, CBS		San Diego State	W 64–59	11–3 (8–0)	17 – Ashworth	10 – Queta	4 – Queta	Smith Spectrum (1,638); Logan, UT
Jan 19, 2021; 7:00 pm, CBSSN		Colorado State	W 83–64	12–3 (9–0)	20 – Miller	12 – Queta	9 – Worster	Smith Spectrum (1,553); Logan, UT
Jan 21, 2021; 9:00 pm, FS1		Colorado State	L 76–84	12–4 (9–1)	14 – Miller	6 – Tied	5 – Tied	Smith Spectrum (1,592); Logan, UT
Jan 25, 2021; 7:00 pm, CBSSN		at UNLV	L 56–59	12–5 (9–2)	18 – Anthony	11 – Queta	3 – Tied	Thomas & Mack Center; Paradise, NV
Jan 27, 2021; 9:00 pm, FS1		at UNLV	W 83–74	13–5 (10–2)	19 – Worster	9 – Tied	9 – Worster	Thomas & Mack Center; Paradise, NV
Feb 4, 2021; 7:00 pm, Stadium		at Fresno State	W 69–53	14–5 (11–2)	14 – Queta	5 – 3 tied	4 – Tied	Save Mart Center; Fresno, CA
Feb 10, 2021; 6:00 pm, Stadium		Wyoming	Postponed due to COVID-19 issues					Smith Spectrum; Logan, UT
Feb 17, 2021; 7:00 pm, CBSSN		at Boise State	L 70–79	14–6 (11–3)	32 – Queta	10 – Queta	6 – Ashworth	ExtraMile Arena (679); Boise, ID
Feb 19, 2021; 8:00 pm, FS1		at Boise State	L 77–81	14–7 (11–4)	30 – Queta	11 – Queta	5 – Ashworth	ExtraMile Arena (872); Boise, ID
Feb 26, 2021; 7:00 pm, FS1		Nevada	W 75–72	15–7 (12–4)	19 – Bean	17 – Queta	8 – Anthony	Smith Spectrum; Logan, UT
Feb 28, 2021; 5:00 pm, FS1		Nevada	W 87–66	16–7 (13–4)	26 – Queta	13 – Queta/Bean	6 – Queta	Smith Spectrum; Logan, UT
Mar 4, 2021; 7:30 pm, FS1		Wyoming	W 72–59	17–7 (14–4)	21 – Bean	13 – Queta	6 – Worster	Smith Spectrum; Logan, UT
Mar 6, 2021; 9:00 pm, FS1		at Fresno State	W 57–51	18–7 (15–4)	13 – Tied	12 – Bean	4 – Anthony	Save Mart Center; Fresno, CA
Mountain West tournament
Mar 11, 2021; 6:00 pm, CBSSN	(2)	vs. (7) UNLV; Quarterfinals	W 74–53	19–7	18 – Queta	13 – Tied	8 – Worster	Thomas & Mack Center; Paradise, NV
Mar 12, 2021; 8:59 pm, CBSSN	(2)	vs. (3) Colorado State; Semifinals	W 62–50	20–7	18 – Queta	14 – Queta	5 – Anthony	Thomas & Mack Center; Paradise, NV
Mar 13, 2021; 3:30 pm, CBS	(2)	vs. (1) No. 19 San Diego State; Championship	L 57–68	20–8	18 – Queta	8 – Anthony	4 – Worster	Thomas & Mack Center; Paradise, NV
NCAA tournament
March 19, 2021; 11:45 am, TNT	(11 S)	vs. (6 S) No. 21 Texas Tech; First Round	L 53–65	20–9	13 – Bean	13 – Queta	5 – Queta	Simon Skjodt Assembly Hall; Bloomington, IN
*Non-conference game. ^{#}Rankings from AP Poll. (#) Tournament seedings in parentheses. All times are in Mountain.
