= 2020–21 Wyoming Cowboys basketball team =

American college basketball season

2020–21 Wyoming Cowboys basketball
- Conference: Mountain West Conference
- Record: 14–11 (7–9 MW)
- Head coach: Jeff Linder (1st season)
- Assistant coaches: Ken DeWeese; Shaun Vandiver; Sundance Wicks
- Home arena: Arena-Auditorium

2020–21 Mountain West Conference men's basketball standings
	Conf.				Overall
Team	W		L	PCT	W		L	PCT
No. 16 San Diego State†	14	–	3	.824	23	–	5	.821
Utah State	15	–	4	.789	20	–	9	.690
Colorado State	14	–	4	.778	20	–	8	.714
Boise State	14	–	6	.700	19	–	9	.679
Nevada	10	–	7	.588	16	–	10	.615
Fresno State	9	–	11	.450	12	–	12	.500
UNLV	8	–	10	.444	12	–	15	.444
Wyoming	7	–	9	.438	14	–	11	.560
San Jose State	3	–	13	.188	5	–	16	.238
Air Force	3	–	17	.150	5	–	20	.200
New Mexico	2	–	15	.118	6	–	16	.273
† Conference tournament winner Rankings from AP poll

The 2020–21 Wyoming Cowboys basketball team represented the University of Wyoming during the 2020–21 NCAA Division I men's basketball season. They were led by Jeff Linder in his first year as head coach at Wyoming. The Cowboys played their home games at the Arena-Auditorium in Laramie, Wyoming as members of the Mountain West Conference. In a season limited due to the ongoing COVID-19 pandemic, the Cowboys finished the season 14–11, 7–9 in Mountain West play to finish in seventh place. They defeated San Jose State in the first round of the Mountain West tournament before losing to San Diego State in the quarterfinals.

== Previous season ==
The Cowboys finished the 2019–20 season 9–24, 2–16 in Mountain West play to finish in last place in the conference. As the 11 seed in the Mountain West tournament, they upset Colorado State and Nevada to reach the semifinals, where they lost to Utah State. They became the first ever 11 seed to win a game at the Mountain West tournament.

On March 9, 2020, head coach Allen Edwards was fired. He finished at Wyoming with a four-year record of 60–76. On March 17, the school announced that Northern Colorado head coach Jeff Linder had been named head coach.

== Offseason ==
=== Departures ===
Name	Number	Pos.	Height	Weight	Year	Hometown	Reason for departure
Jake Hendricks	0	G	6'5"	170	Senior	Smithfield, UT	Graduated
A.J. Banks	2	G	6'2"	163	Senior	Las Vegas, NV	Graduated
TJ Taylor	11	G/F	6'6"	197	Sophomore	Chesapeake, VA	Transferred to James Madison
Greg Milton III	12	G	6'3"	185	Sophomore	Elk Grove, CA	Transferred to Cal State San Marcos
Brandon Porter	13	F	6'8"	193	Sophomore	Virginia Beach, VA	Transferred to Humboldt State
Austin Mueller	14	F	6'6"	210	Sophomore	Highlands Ranch, CO	Injuries
Tyler Morman	15	F	6'9"	220	Junior	Mableton, GA	Transferred to Southern Miss
Javier Turner	31	F	6'11"	230	Freshman	Omaha, NE	Transferred to Wabash Valley College

=== Incoming transfers ===
Name	Number	Pos.	Height	Weight	Year	Hometown	Previous School
Drake Jeffries	0	G	6'5"	185	Junior	Mattoon, IL	Indian Hills Community College
Drew LaMont	2	F	6'8"	225	Junior	Plantation, FL	Indian River State College
Eoin Nelson	11	F	6'10"	225	Sophommore	Dublin, IRE	Otero Junior College

=== Recruiting classes ===
==== 2020 recruiting class ====
College recruiting information
Name	Hometown	School	Height	Weight	Commit date
Xavier Dusell; G	Scottsdale, AZ	Arizona Compass Prep	6 ft 4 in (1.93 m)	190 lb (86 kg)	Mar 24, 2020
Xavier Dusell; G	Recruit ratings: Scout: Rivals: 247Sports: ESPN:				
Marcus Williams; SG	Dickinson, TX	Dickinson HS	6 ft 2 in (1.88 m)	180 lb (82 kg)	Apr 9, 2020
Marcus Williams; SG	Recruit ratings: Scout: Rivals: 247Sports: ESPN:				
Graham Ike; F	Aurora, CO	Overland HS	6 ft 9 in (2.06 m)	245 lb (111 kg)	Apr 15, 2020
Graham Ike; F	Recruit ratings: Scout: Rivals: 247Sports: ESPN:				
Jeremiah Oden; F	Chicago, IL	Sunrise Christian Academy	6 ft 8 in (2.03 m)	180 lb (82 kg)	May 2, 2020
Jeremiah Oden; F	Recruit ratings: Scout: Rivals: 247Sports: ESPN:				
Overall recruit ranking: Scout: – Rivals: 53
Note: In many cases, Scout, Rivals, 247Sports, On3, and ESPN may conflict in their listings of height and weight.; In these cases, the average was taken. ESPN grades are on a 100-point scale.; Sources: "ESPN – Wyoming Cowboys Basketball Recruiting 2020". ESPN.; "2020 Team Ranking". Rivals.

==== 2021 recruiting class ====
College recruiting information (2021)
Name	Hometown	School	Height	Weight	Commit date
Ben Bowen; G	Highlands Ranch, CO	Mountain Vista HS	6 ft 5 in (1.96 m)	180 lb (82 kg)	Nov 11, 2020
Ben Bowen; G	Recruit ratings: Scout: Rivals: 247Sports: ESPN:				
Nate Barnhart; F	Lenexa, KS	De Soto HS	7 ft 0 in (2.13 m)	185 lb (84 kg)	Nov 11, 2020
Nate Barnhart; F	Recruit ratings: Scout: Rivals: 247Sports: ESPN:				
Overall recruit ranking: Scout: – Rivals: —
Note: In many cases, Scout, Rivals, 247Sports, On3, and ESPN may conflict in their listings of height and weight.; In these cases, the average was taken. ESPN grades are on a 100-point scale.; Sources: "ESPN – Wyoming Cowboys Basketball Recruiting 2020". ESPN.; "2021 Team Ranking". Rivals.

== Roster ==
2020–21 Wyoming Cowboys men's basketball team
Players
Coaches

Pos.	#	Name	Height	Weight	Year	Previous school	Hometown
G	0	Drake Jeffries	6 ft 5 in (1.96 m)	185 lb (84 kg)	RS Jr	Indian Hills CC; Mattoon HS	Mattoon, IL
G	1	Marcus Williams	6 ft 2 in (1.88 m)	180 lb (82 kg)	Fr	Dickinson HS	Dickinson, TX
F	2	Drew LaMont	6 ft 8 in (2.03 m)	225 lb (102 kg)	Jr	Indian River State College; American Heritage HS	Plantation, FL
G	3	Kwane Marble II	6 ft 6 in (1.98 m)	195 lb (88 kg)	So	Denver East HS	Denver, CO
F	10	Hunter Thompson	6 ft 10 in (2.08 m)	235 lb (107 kg)	RS Jr	Pine Bluffs HS	Pine Bluffs, WY
F	11	Eoin Nelson	6 ft 10 in (2.08 m)	225 lb (102 kg)	So	Otero Junior College; UCD Marian	Dublin, IRE
G	22	Kenny Foster	6 ft 5 in (1.96 m)	190 lb (86 kg)	So	Smoky Hill HS	Aurora, CO
G	24	Hunter Maldonado	6 ft 7 in (2.01 m)	200 lb (91 kg)	RS Jr	Vista Ridge HS	Colorado Springs, CO
F	25	Jeremiah Oden	6 ft 8 in (2.03 m)	180 lb (82 kg)	Fr	Sunrise Christian Academy	Chicago, IL
F	33	Graham Ike	6 ft 9 in (2.06 m)	245 lb (111 kg)	Fr	Overland HS	Aurora, CO
G	53	Xavier DuSell	6 ft 4 in (1.93 m)	190 lb (86 kg)	Fr	Arizona Compass Prep	Scottsdale, AZ
F	55	John Grigsby	6 ft 9 in (2.06 m)	215 lb (98 kg)	Fr	Park Center HS	Louisville, CO

Head coach

- Jeff Linder (Western Colorado)

Assistant coach(es)

- Ken DeWeese (Mary Hardin–Baylor)
- Shaun Vandiver (Colorado)
- Sundance Wicks (Northern State)

Legend

- (C) Team captain
- (S) Suspended
- (I) Ineligible
- (W) Walk-on
- Injured
- Current redshirt

Roster
Last update: October 16, 2020

== Statistics ==
Player	GP	GS	MPG	FG%	3FG%	FT%	RPG	APG	SPG	BPG	PPG
Terrin Dickey	1	0	.4	—	—	—	.0	.0	.0	.0	.0
Xavier DuSell	25	11	23.7	.497	.456	.700	1.9	.9	.4	.0	9.7
Kenny Foster	17	12	24.5	.464	.419	.722	3.6	.9	.4	.4	9.1
John Grigsby	3	0	1.0	.000	.000	—	.0	.0	.0	.0	.0
Graham Ike	12	7	21.3	.602	.000	.683	5.4	.8	.5	.3	11.2
Drake Jeffries	25	4	22.6	.381	.366	.882	2.7	.8	.5	.3	7.4
Drew LaMont	5	0	10.4	.500	.500	1.000	1.2	.8	.0	.0	3.4
Hunter Maldonado	25	25	35.8	.419	.200	.694	6.8	4.6	1.2	.4	12.5
Kwane Marble II	23	13	23.0	.456	.308	.734	4.1	1.2	1.0	.0	9.5
Eoin Nelson	8	0	9.9	.579	—	.500	3.1	.0	.3	.0	3.1
Jeremiah Oden	23	11	13.7	.393	.241	.857	2.7	.4	.3	.3	4.0
Hunter Thompson	24	18	23.4	.426	.358	.750	3.8	.9	.6	.5	7.0
Marcus Williams	25	24	31.1	.452	.330	.705	2.5	4.3	1.4	.2	14.8

== Schedule and results ==
The beginning of the season was delayed until November 25 as a result of the ongoing COVID–19 pandemic. The Mountain West conference announced changes to the conference schedule that included a 20-game conference slate, and the school announced the non-conference portion of their schedule November 10.

Date time, TV	Rank^{#}	Opponent^{#}	Result	Record	Site (attendance) city, state
Non-Conference
November 28, 2020*; 2:00 pm		Mississippi Valley State	W 97–61	1–0	Arena-Auditorium (1,126); Laramie, WY
November 30*; 7:00 pm		Texas Southern	L 74–76	1–1	Arena-Auditorium (1,066); Laramie, WY
December 2*; 7:00 pm		Incarnate Word	W 94–83 ^{OT}	2–1	Arena-Auditorium (1,066); Laramie, WY
December 6*; 2:00 pm, P12N		at Oregon State	W 76–73	3–1	Gill Coliseum; Corvallis, OR
December 9*; 7:00 pm		Denver	W 83–61	4–1	Arena-Auditorium (736); Laramie, WY
December 12*; 2:00 pm		at Utah Valley	W 93–88	5–1	UCCU Center; Orem, UT
December 17*; 7:00 pm		Omaha	W 82–78	6–1	Arena-Auditorium; Laramie, WY
Mountain West Conference
January 2, 2021; 5:00 pm		at Fresno State	W 78–74	7–1 (1–0)	Save Mart Center; Fresno, CA
January 4; 7:00 pm		at Fresno State	L 61–81	7–2 (1–1)	Save Mart Center; Fresno, CA
January 11; 7:00 pm, CBSSN		Boise State	L 60–83	7–3 (1–2)	Arena-Auditorium; Laramie, WY
January 13; 7:00 pm, CBSSN		Boise State	L 70–90	7–4 (1–3)	Arena-Auditorium; Laramie, WY
January 16; 2:00 pm		at Air Force	L 69–72	7–5 (1–4)	Clune Arena; Colorado Springs, CO
January 18; 7:00 pm		at Air Force	W 77–58	8–5 (2–4)	Clune Arena; Colorado Springs, CO
January 22; 6:00 pm, Stadium		Nevada	W 71–64	9–5 (3–4)	Arena-Auditorium; Laramie, WY
January 24; 2:00 pm, CBSSN		Nevada	W 93–88	10–5 (4–4)	Arena-Auditorium; Laramie, WY
January 28; 7:00 pm, FS1		at San Diego State	L 57–87	10–6 (4–5)	Viejas Arena; San Diego, CA
January 30; 8:00 pm, CBSSN		at San Diego State	L 71–98	10–7 (4–6)	Viejas Arena; San Diego, CA
February 4; 7:00 pm		Colorado State; Border War	L 72–74	10–8 (4–7)	Arena-Auditorium (1,807); Laramie, WY
February 6; 4:00 pm, CBSSN		Colorado State; Border War	L 59–68	10–9 (4–8)	Arena-Auditorium (2,000); Laramie, WY
February 17; 6:00 pm		vs. New Mexico	W 83–74 ^{OT}	11–9 (5–8)	Clune Arena; Colorado Springs, CO
February 19; 7:00 pm, CBSSN		vs. New Mexico	W 79–67	12–9 (6–8)	Clune Arena; Colorado Springs, CO
February 25; 7:00 pm		San Jose State	Cancelled		Arena-Auditorium; Laramie, WY
February 27; 2:00 pm		San Jose State	Cancelled		Arena-Auditorium; Laramie, WY
March 4; 7:30 pm, FS1		at Utah State	L 59–72	12–10 (6–9)	Smith Spectrum (1,627); Logan, UT
March 6; 9:00 pm, CBSSN		UNLV	W 80–69	13–10 (7–9)	Arena-Auditorium (1,182); Laramie, WY
Mountain West tournament
March 10; 12:00 pm, Stadium	(8)	vs. (9) San Jose State; First round	W 111–80	14–10	Thomas & Mack Center; Paradise, NV
March 11; 1:00 pm, CBSSN	(8)	vs. (1) No. 19 San Diego State; Quarterfinals	L 66–69	14–11	Thomas & Mack Center; Paradise, NV
*Non-conference game. ^{#}Rankings from AP Poll. (#) Tournament seedings in parentheses. All times are in Mountain Time.
