= 2020–21 UNLV Runnin' Rebels basketball team =

American college basketball season

2020–21 UNLV Runnin' Rebels basketball
- Conference: Mountain West Conference
- Record: 12–15 (8–10 MW)
- Head coach: T. J. Otzelberger (2nd season)
- Assistant coaches: Tim Buckley; Kevin Kruger; DeMarlo Slocum
- Home arena: Thomas & Mack Center

2020–21 Mountain West Conference men's basketball standings
	Conf.				Overall
Team	W		L	PCT	W		L	PCT
No. 16 San Diego State†	14	–	3	.824	23	–	5	.821
Utah State	15	–	4	.789	20	–	9	.690
Colorado State	14	–	4	.778	20	–	8	.714
Boise State	14	–	6	.700	19	–	9	.679
Nevada	10	–	7	.588	16	–	10	.615
Fresno State	9	–	11	.450	12	–	12	.500
UNLV	8	–	10	.444	12	–	15	.444
Wyoming	7	–	9	.438	14	–	11	.560
San Jose State	3	–	13	.188	5	–	16	.238
Air Force	3	–	17	.150	5	–	20	.200
New Mexico	2	–	15	.118	6	–	16	.273
† Conference tournament winner Rankings from AP poll

The 2020–21 UNLV Runnin' Rebels basketball team represented the University of Nevada, Las Vegas during the 2020–21 NCAA Division I men's basketball season. The Runnin' Rebels were led by second-year head coach T. J. Otzelberger and played their home games at the Thomas & Mack Center in Paradise, Nevada as members of the Mountain West Conference.

== Previous season ==
The Runnin' Rebels finished the 2019–20 season 17–15, 12–6 in Mountain West play to finish in a three-way tie for second place. They lost in the quarterfinals of the Mountain West tournament to Boise State.

== Roster ==
2020–21 UNLV Runnin' Rebels men's basketball team
Players
Coaches

Pos.	#	Name	Height	Weight	Year	Previous school	Hometown
G	0	Donovan Yap	6 ft 3 in (1.91 m)	175 lb (79 kg)	RS Fr	Arbor View HS	Las Vegas, NV
F	1	Moses Wood	6 ft 8 in (2.03 m)	210 lb (95 kg)	RS So	Tulane	Reno, NV
G	2	Trey Hurlburt (W)	5 ft 11 in (1.8 m)	175 lb (79 kg)	Jr	Cal State San Marcos	Las Vegas, NV
G	3	Caleb Grill	6 ft 3 in (1.91 m)	195 lb (88 kg)	So	Iowa State	Wichita, KS
G	5	David Jenkins Jr.	6 ft 2 in (1.88 m)	195 lb (88 kg)	RS Jr	South Dakota State	Tacoma, WA
F	10	Edoardo Del Cadia	6 ft 7 in (2.01 m)	235 lb (107 kg)	Jr	College of Central FL	Senigallia, Italy
C	12	Jhaylon Martinez	6 ft 11 in (2.11 m)	260 lb (118 kg)	Fr	Dream City Christian HS	Vallejo, CA
G	13	Bryce Hamilton	6 ft 4 in (1.93 m)	205 lb (93 kg)	Jr	Pasadena HS	Pasadena, CA
G	14	Isaac Lindsey	6 ft 4 in (1.93 m)	190 lb (86 kg)	Fr	Mineral Point HS	Mineral Point, WI
F	15	Reece Brown	6 ft 9 in (2.06 m)	200 lb (91 kg)	RS Fr	Loomis Chaffee School	Albany, NY
G	22	Nick Blake	6 ft 6 in (1.98 m)	200 lb (91 kg)	Fr	IMG Academy	Las Vegas, NV
F	24	Kendrick Gilbert	6 ft 5 in (1.96 m)	190 lb (86 kg)	Fr	Durango HS	Las Vegas, NV
F	30	Devin Tillis	6 ft 6 in (1.98 m)	215 lb (98 kg)	Fr	Windward HS	Los Angeles, CA
G	31	Marvin Coleman (W)	6 ft 3 in (1.91 m)	200 lb (91 kg)	Jr	Foothill HS	Las Vegas, NV
F	34	Cheikh Mbacke Diong	6 ft 11 in (2.11 m)	220 lb (100 kg)	Sr	Florida Preparatory Academy	Dakar, Senegal

Head coach

- T. J. Otzelberger (UW–Whitewater)

Assistant coach(es)

- Tim Buckley (Bemidji State)
- Kevin Kruger (UNLV)
- DeMarlo Slocum (Georgia Southern)

Legend

- (C) Team captain
- (S) Suspended
- (I) Ineligible
- (W) Walk-on
- Injured
- Current redshirt

Roster

== Schedule and results ==
Date time, TV	Rank^{#}	Opponent^{#}	Result	Record	Site (attendance) city, state
Regular season
November 25, 2020*; 6:30 pm		Montana State	L 78–91	0–1	Thomas & Mack Center; Paradise, NV
November 30, 2020*; 4:00 pm, ESPN2		vs. No. 14 North Carolina; Maui Invitational quarterfinals	L 51–78	0–2	Harrah's Cherokee Center; Asheville, NC
December 1, 2020*; 6:30 pm, ESPN2		vs. Alabama; Maui Invitational consolation 2nd round	L 74–86	0–3	Harrah's Cherokee Center; Asheville, NC
December 2, 2020*; 6:30 pm, ESPN2		vs. Davidson; Maui Invitational 7th place game	L 73–77	0–4	Harrah's Cherokee Center; Asheville, NC
December 5, 2020*; 5:00 pm, ESPN+		at Kansas State	W 68–58	1–4	Bramlage Coliseum; Manhattan, KS
January 7, 2021; 5:00 pm, CBSSN		at Colorado State	L 71–74	1–5 (0–1)	Moby Arena; Fort Collins, CO
January 9, 2021; 1:00 pm, FS1		at Colorado State	L 80–83	1–6 (0–2)	Moby Arena; Fort Collins, CO
January 12, 2021*; 2:00 pm		St. Katherine	W 95–34	2–6	Thomas & Mack Center; Paradise, NV
January 16, 2021; 2:30 pm, CBSSN		New Mexico	W 77–54	3–6 (1–2)	Thomas & Mack Center; Paradise, NV
January 18, 2021; 6:30 pm, FS1		New Mexico	W 53–46	4–6 (2–2)	Thomas & Mack Center; Paradise, NV
January 21, 2021*; 5:00 pm		Benedictine Mesa	W 99–45	5–6	Thomas & Mack Center; Paradise, NV
January 25, 2021; 6:00 pm, CBSSN		Utah State	W 59–56	6–6 (3–2)	Thomas & Mack Center; Paradise, NV
January 27, 2021; 8:00 pm, FS1		Utah State	L 74–83	6–7 (3–3)	Thomas & Mack Center; Paradise, NV
January 31, 2021; 6:30 pm, FS1		at Nevada	L 60–89	6–8 (3–4)	Lawlor Events Center (50); Reno, NV
February 2, 2021; 6:00 pm, CBSSN		at Nevada	L 62–72	6–9 (3–5)	Lawlor Events Center (50); Reno, NV
February 6, 2021; 1:00 pm, CBSSN		Air Force	W 68–58	7–9 (4–5)	Thomas & Mack Center (50); Paradise, NV
February 8, 2021; 6:00 pm, CBSSN		Air Force	W 69–64	8–9 (5–5)	Thomas & Mack Center; Paradise, NV
February 11, 2021; 7:00 pm, CBSSN		at Boise State	L 66–78	8–10 (5–6)	ExtraMile Arena; Boise, ID
February 13, 2021; 7:00 pm, FS1		at Boise State	L 59–61	8–11 (5–7)	ExtraMile Arena; Boise, ID
February 19, 2021; 6:30 pm, Stadium		at San Jose State	W 76–60	9–11 (6–7)	Provident Credit Union Event Center; San Jose, CA
February 21, 2021; 6:30 pm, CBSSN		at San Jose State	W 67–64	10–11 (7–7)	Provident Credit Union Event Center; San Jose, CA
February 24, 2021; 1:00 pm, FS1		Fresno State	L 64–67	10–12 (7–8)	Thomas & Mack Center; Paradise, NV
February 26, 2021; 8:00 pm, CBSSN		Fresno State	W 68–67	11–12 (8–8)	Thomas & Mack Center; Fresno, CA
March 3, 2021; 6:00 pm, CBSSN		No. 19 San Diego State	L 62–71	11–13 (8–9)	Thomas & Mack Center; Paradise, NV
March 6, 2021; 9:00 pm, CBSSN		at Wyoming	L 69–80	11–14 (8–10)	Arena-Auditorium; Laramie, WY
Mountain West tournament
Mar 10, 2021; 1:30 pm, Stadium	(7)	vs. (10) Air Force; First round	W 80–52	12–14	Thomas & Mack Center; Paradise, NV
Mar 11, 2021; 6:30 pm, Stadium	(7)	vs. (2) Utah State; Quarterfinals	L 53–74	12–15	Thomas & Mack Center; Paradise, NV
*Non-conference game. ^{#}Rankings from AP Poll. (#) Tournament seedings in parentheses. All times are in Pacific Time.
