= 2020–21 Colorado State Rams men's basketball team =

American college basketball season

2020–21 Colorado State Rams men's basketball

NIT, Fourth place
- Conference: Mountain West Conference
- Record: 20–8 (14–4 MW)
- Head coach: Niko Medved (3rd season)
- Assistant coaches: Dave Thorson; JR Blount; Ali Farokhmanesh
- Home arena: Moby Arena

2020–21 Mountain West Conference men's basketball standings
	Conf.				Overall
Team	W		L	PCT	W		L	PCT
No. 16 San Diego State†	14	–	3	.824	23	–	5	.821
Utah State	15	–	4	.789	20	–	9	.690
Colorado State	14	–	4	.778	20	–	8	.714
Boise State	14	–	6	.700	19	–	9	.679
Nevada	10	–	7	.588	16	–	10	.615
Fresno State	9	–	11	.450	12	–	12	.500
UNLV	8	–	10	.444	12	–	15	.444
Wyoming	7	–	9	.438	14	–	11	.560
San Jose State	3	–	13	.188	5	–	16	.238
Air Force	3	–	17	.150	5	–	20	.200
New Mexico	2	–	15	.118	6	–	16	.273
† Conference tournament winner Rankings from AP poll

The 2020–21 Colorado State Rams men's basketball team represented Colorado State University during the 2020–21 NCAA Division I men's basketball season. The team was coached by Niko Medved in his third season. The Rams played their home games at Moby Arena on CSU's main campus in Fort Collins, Colorado as members of the Mountain West Conference. They finished the season 20–8, 14–4 to finish in 3rd place. They defeated Fresno State in the quarterfinals of the Mountain West tournament before losing in the semifinals to Utah State. They received an invitation to the NIT where they defeated Buffalo and NC State to advance to the semifinals where they lost to Memphis. They played the third-place game where they lost to Louisiana Tech.

== Previous season ==
The Rams finished the 2019–20 season 20–12, 11–7 in Mountain West play to finish in a tie for fifth place. They lost in the first round of the Mountain West tournament to Wyoming.

== Offseason ==
=== Departures ===
Name	Number	Pos.	Height	Weight	Year	Hometown	Reason for departure
Hyron Edwards	0	G	6'0"	165	RS Senior	East Chicago, IN	Graduation
Kris Martin	1	G	6'4"	190	RS Senior	Frisco, TX	Graduation
Nico Carvacho	32	F/C	6'11"	245	RS Senior	Frisco, TX	Graduation
Teyvion Kirk	2	G	6'4"	185	Junior	Joliet, IL	Transferred to UIC

=== 2020 Recruiting Class ===
College recruiting information
Name	Hometown	School	Height	Weight	Commit date
Isaiah Rivera; SG	Geneseo, IL	Geneseo High School	6 ft 4 in (1.93 m)	185 lb (84 kg)	Nov 13, 2019
Isaiah Rivera; SG	Recruit ratings: Scout: Rivals: ESPN: (N/A)				
Jacob Jennissen; C	Sauk Centre, MN	Sauk Centre Secondary	6 ft 11 in (2.11 m)	232 lb (105 kg)	Unknown
Jacob Jennissen; C	Recruit ratings: Scout: Rivals: ESPN: (N/A)				
Trace Young; G	Austin, TX	Dripping Springs High School	6 ft 3 in (1.91 m)	180 lb (82 kg)	Feb 10, 2020
Trace Young; G	Recruit ratings: Scout: Rivals: ESPN: (N/A)				
Overall recruit ranking: Scout: – Rivals: –
Note: In many cases, Scout, Rivals, 247Sports, On3, and ESPN may conflict in their listings of height and weight.; In these cases, the average was taken. ESPN grades are on a 100-point scale.; Sources: "Colorado State Commit List for 2020". Rivals.; "Men's Basketball Recruiting". Scout.; "ESPN – Colorado State Rams Basketball Recruiting 2020". ESPN.; "Scout.com Team Recruiting Rankings". Scout.; "2020 Team Ranking". Rivals.

== Roster ==
2020–21 Colorado State Rams men's basketball team
Players
Coaches

Pos.	#	Name	Height	Weight	Year	Previous school	Hometown
G	0	Trace Young	6 ft 3 in (1.91 m)	176 lb (80 kg)	Fr	Dripping Springs HS	Austin, TX
G	1	John Tonje	6 ft 5 in (1.96 m)	222 lb (101 kg)	So	Omaha Central HS	Omaha, NE
G	3	Kendle Moore	5 ft 10 in (1.78 m)	151 lb (68 kg)	Jr	Danville HS	Danville, IL
G	4	Isaiah Stevens	6 ft 0 in (1.83 m)	180 lb (82 kg)	So	Allen HS	Allen, TX
G	5	P. J. Byrd	6 ft 1 in (1.85 m)	175 lb (79 kg)	Jr	Bush HS; VCU	Houston, TX
F	10	James Moors	6 ft 10 in (2.08 m)	239 lb (108 kg)	RS Fr	Westlake Boys HS	Auckland, New Zealand
F	11	Dischon Thomas	6 ft 9 in (2.06 m)	232 lb (105 kg)	So	Hillcrest Prep	Phoenix, AZ
G/F	21	David Roddy	6 ft 5 in (1.96 m)	252 lb (114 kg)	So	Breck School	Minneapolis, MN
G	22	Nick Bassett	6 ft 4 in (1.93 m)	193 lb (88 kg)	So	Cheyenne Mountain HS; Nebraska Wesleyan	Colorado Springs, CO
G	23	Isaiah Rivera	6 ft 5 in (1.96 m)	209 lb (95 kg)	Fr	Geneseo HS	Geneseo, IL
F	31	Adam Thistlewood	6 ft 6 in (1.98 m)	212 lb (96 kg)	Jr	Golden HS	Golden, CO
C	35	Jacob Jennissen	6 ft 11 in (2.11 m)	232 lb (105 kg)	Fr	Sauk Centre Secondary	Sauk Centre, MN

Head coach

- Niko Medved (Minnesota)

Assistant coach(es)

- Dave Thorson (Hamline)
- JR Blount (Loyola Chicago)
- Ali Farokhmanesh (Northern Iowa)

Legend

- (C) Team captain
- (S) Suspended
- (I) Ineligible
- (W) Walk-on
- Injured
- Current redshirt

Roster
Last update: December 30, 2020

== Schedule and results ==
Date time, TV	Rank^{#}	Opponent^{#}	Result	Record	Site (attendance) city, state
Regular season
December 12, 2020*; 2:30 0m, MWN		CSU–Pueblo	W 89–77	1–0	Moby Arena; Fort Collins, CO
December 14, 2020*; 6:00 pm, MWN		Northern Arizona	W 91–52	2–0	Moby Arena; Fort Collins, CO
December 19, 2020*; 6:00 pm, WCCN		at Saint Mary's	L 33–53	2–1	University Credit Union Pavilion; Moraga, CA
December 22, 2022*; 2:00 pm, WCCN		vs. Santa Clara	W 70–57	3–1	Kaiser Permanente Arena; Santa Cruz, CA
December 28, 2020; 6:00 pm, MWN		Fresno State	W 75–53	4–1 (1–0)	Moby Arena; Fort Collins, CO
December 30, 2020; 2:00 pm, MWN		Fresno State	W 81–59	5–1 (2–0)	Moby Arena; Fort Collins, CO
January 2, 2021; 2:00 pm, CBS		at San Diego State	W 70–67	6–1 (3–0)	Viejas Arena; San Diego, CA
January 4, 2021; 7:00 pm, FS1		at San Diego State	L 65–78	6–2 (3–1)	Viejas Arena; San Diego, CA
January 7, 2021; 6:00 pm, CBSSN		UNLV	W 74–71	7–2 (4–1)	Moby Arena; Fort Collins, CO
January 9, 2021; 2:00 pm, FS1		UNLV	W 83–80	8–2 (5–1)	Moby Arena; Fort Collins, CO
January 14, 2021; 7:30 pm, MWN		vs. San Jose State	W 90–57	9–2 (6–1)	Ability360; Phoenix, AZ
January 16, 2021; 4:00 pm, MWN		vs. San Jose State	W 88–61	10–2 (7–1)	Ability360; Phoenix, AZ
January 19, 2021; 7:00 pm, CBSSN		at Utah State	L 64–83	10–3 (7–2)	Smith Spectrum (1,553); Logan, UT
January 21, 2021; 9:00 pm, FS1		at Utah State	W 84–76	11–3 (8–2)	Smith Spectrum (1,592); Logan, UT
January 27, 2021; 7:00 pm, CBSSN		Boise State	W 78–56	12–3 (9–2)	Moby Arena; Fort Collins, CO
January 29, 2021; 9:00 pm, FS1		Boise State	L 77–85	12–4 (9–3)	Moby Arena; Fort Collins, CO
February 4, 2021; 7:00 pm, MWN		at Wyoming	W 74–72	13–4 (10–3)	Arena-Auditorium (1,807); Laramie, WY
February 6, 2021; 4:00 pm, CBSSN		at Wyoming	W 68–59	14–4 (11–3)	Arena-Auditorium (2,000); Laramie, WY
February 16, 2021*; 7:00 pm, MWN		Northern Colorado	Cancelled due to Covid-19		Moby Arena; Fort Collins, CO
February 27, 2021; 2:00 pm, MWN		Air Force	W 72–49	15–4 (12–3)	Moby Arena; Fort Collins, CO
March 1, 2021; 8:00 pm, CBSSN		Air Force	W 74–44	16–4 (13–3)	Moby Arena; Fort Collins, CO
March 3, 2021; 6:00 pm, CBSSN		New Mexico; Previously scheduled for Feb. 9	W 87–73	17–4 (14–3)	Moby Arena; Fort Collins, CO
March 5, 2021; 7:00 pm, CBSSN		at Nevada; Previously scheduled for Feb. 20	L 82–85	17–5 (14–4)	Lawlor Events Center (100); Reno, NV
Mountain West tournament
March 11, 2021; 9:30 pm, CBSSN	(3)	vs. (6) Fresno State; Quarterfinals	W 72–62	18–5	Thomas & Mack Center; Las Vegas, NV
March 12, 2021; 9:59 pm, CBSSN	(3)	vs. (2) Utah State; Semifinals	L 50–62	18–6	Thomas & Mack Center; Las Vegas, NV
NIT
March 19, 2021; 5:00 pm, ESPN2	(1)	vs. (4) Buffalo; First round – Colorado State bracket	W 75–73	19–6	The Super Pit; Denton, TX
March 25, 2021; 5:00 pm, ESPN	(1)	vs. (3) NC State; Quarterfinals – Colorado State bracket	W 65–61	20–6	Comerica Center; Frisco, TX
March 27, 2021; 9:00 am, ESPN	(1)	vs. (1) Memphis; Semifinals	L 67–90	20–7	Comerica Center; Frisco, TX
March 28, 2021; 12:00 pm, ESPN	(1)	vs. (4) Louisiana Tech; Third-place game	L 74–76	20–8	Comerica Center; Frisco, TX
*Non-conference game. ^{#}Rankings from AP Poll. (#) Tournament seedings in parentheses. All times are in Mountain Time.

== Notable games ==
=== Regular season ===
- January 2, 2021 at Viejas Arena: Colorado State came back from a 26-point deficit to beat San Diego State 70–67, the largest comeback in Mountain West history.

=== 2021 Mountain West tournament ===
- Quarterfinals: March 11, 2021 at Thomas & Mack Center: No. 3 seed Colorado State beat No. 6 seed Fresno State 72–62 in the quarterfinals of the 2021 Mountain West Conference men's basketball tournament.
- Semifinals: March 12, 2021 at Thomas & Mack Center: No. 3 seed Colorado State was beaten by No. 2 seed Utah State 62–50 in the semifinals of the tournament. Utah State would continue on to lose to San Diego State in the tournament championship.

=== 2021 National Invitation Tournament (NIT) ===
- First round: March 19, 2021 at UNT Coliseum: No. 1 seed Colorado State beat No. 4 seed Buffalo 75–73 on a game-winning layup by Isaiah Stevens in the first round of the National Invitation Tournament.
- Quarterfinals: March 25, 2021 at Comerica Center: No. 1 seed Colorado State beat No. 3 seed NC State 65–61. Isaiah Stevens led scoring for the Rams, recording 18 points on 6 of 13 shots and four free throws.
- Semifinals: March 27, 2021 at Comerica Center: No. 1 seed Colorado State was beaten by No. 1 seed Memphis, 90–67. Memphis would continue on to win the 2021 National Invitation Tournament.
- Third-place game: March 28, 2021 at Comerica Center: No. 1 seed Colorado State was beaten by No. 4 seed Louisiana Tech 76–74 on a buzzer beater shot by Louisiana Tech star Kenneth Lofton Jr.
