= Marcus Williams (basketball, born 2002) =

American basketball player

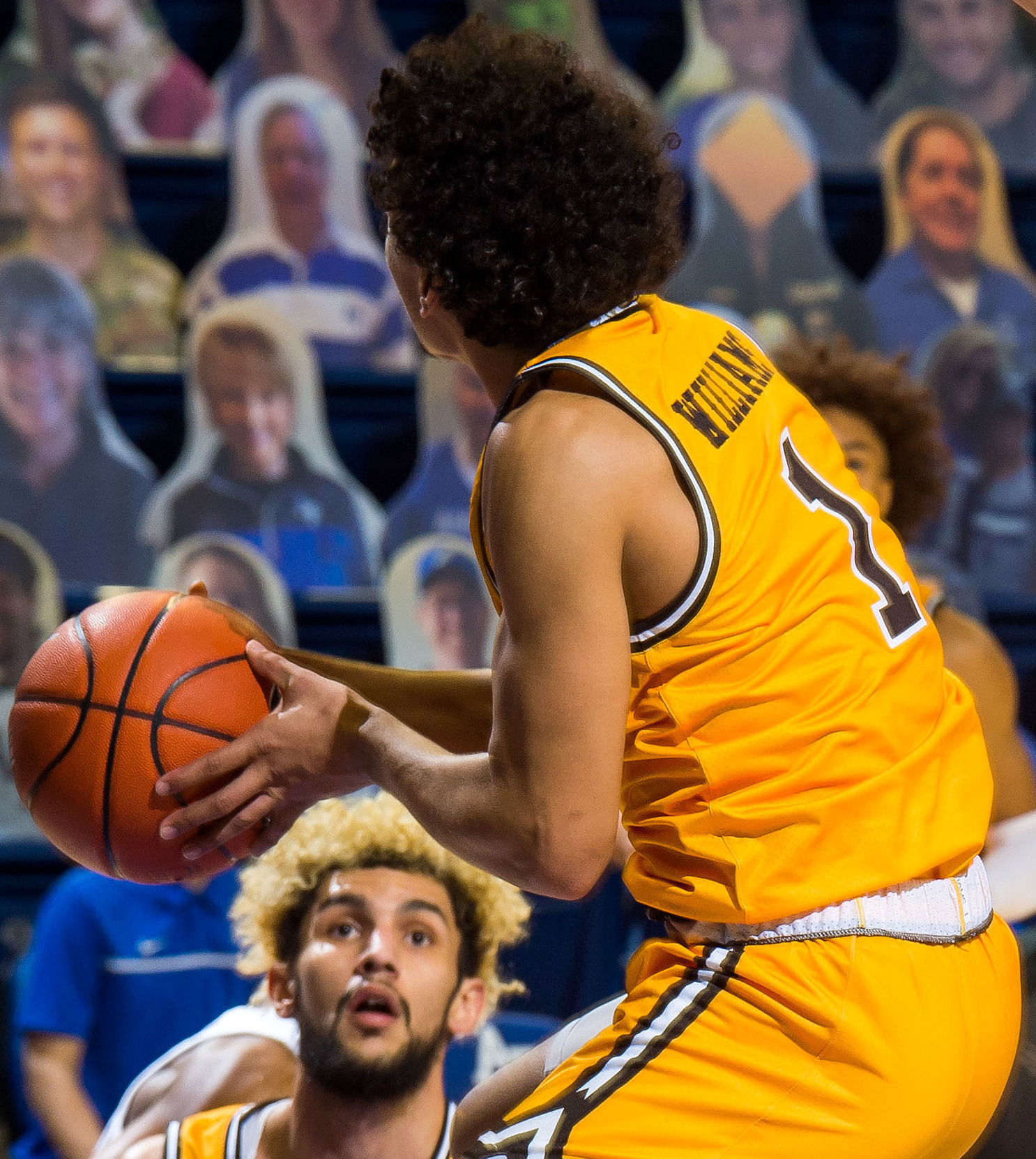
- Williams in 2021

Antibes Sharks
- Position: Point guard
- League: Élite 2

Personal information
- Born: July 29, 2002 (age 24)
- Listed height: 6 ft 2 in (1.88 m)
- Listed weight: 197 lb (89 kg)

Career information
- High school: Dickinson (Dickinson, Texas); Clear Springs (League City, Texas)
- College: Wyoming (2020–2021); Texas A&M (2021–2022); San Francisco (2022–2025)
- NBA draft: 2025: undrafted
- Playing career: 2025–present

Career history
- 2025–2026: Maccabi Rishon LeZion
- 2026–present: Antibes Sharks

Career highlights
- 2× First-team All-WCC (2024, 2025); Third-team All-Mountain West (2021); Mountain West Freshman of the Year (2021)

Marcus Edward Williams (born July 29, 2002) is an American professional basketball player for the Antibes Sharks of the French Élite 2. He played college basketball for the Wyoming Cowboys, Texas A&M Aggies, and the San Francisco Dons and went undrafted in the 2025 NBA draft.

== High school career ==
Williams played basketball for Dickinson High School in Dickinson, Texas as a freshman. He transferred to Clear Springs High School in League City, Texas for his sophomore season to play with his older brother, Faite. After the season, Williams returned to Dickinson but was ruled ineligible to play for the varsity team, moving down to junior varsity. As a senior, he averaged 21.4 points, 7.3 assists, 3.9 rebounds and 3.3 steals, helping his team achieve a 32–5 record, win the Region III-6A title and advance to its first state tournament in 65 years. Williams shared District 24-6A MVP honors with his teammate, Tramon Mark.

He originally signed a National Letter of Intent to play college basketball for Northern Colorado under head coach Jeff Linder. He switched his commitment to Wyoming after Linder was hired there.

== College career ==
On December 9, 2020, Williams scored a freshman season-high 30 points for Wyoming in an 83–61 win over Denver. On March 10, 2021, he recorded 15 points, 10 assists, seven steals and six rebounds in a 111–80 first round victory over San Jose State at the Mountain West tournament. As a freshman, Williams averaged 14.8 points and 4.3 assists per game. He was named Mountain West Freshman of the Year and to the Third Team All-Mountain West.

Following the season, Williams transferred to Texas A&M. He averaged 7.9 points, 3.4 assists, 2.2 rebounds, and 1.3 steals per game. For his junior season, Williams transferred to San Francisco.

On March 7, 2025, right before the WCC tournament, the University of San Francisco announced that Williams would be sidelined indefinitely after receiving information that he had violated a NCAA rule. On December 10, the NCAA accused Williams of sharing information of his statistics with Fresno State's Mykell Robinson, who had been betting on daily fantasy sites.

== Professional career ==
After going undrafted in the 2025 NBA draft, Williams joined the Miami Heat for the 2025 NBA Summer League.

On August 25, 2025, Williams signed with Maccabi Rishon Lezion of the Israeli Basketball Premier League. In 2025-26 in 24 games he averaged 7.8 points and 2.3 assists per game.

== Career statistics ==
Legend
GP	Games played	GS	Games started	MPG	Minutes per game
FG%	Field goal percentage	3P%	3-point field goal percentage	FT%	Free throw percentage
RPG	Rebounds per game	APG	Assists per game	SPG	Steals per game
BPG	Blocks per game	PPG	Points per game	**Bold**	Career high

=== College ===
Year	Team	GP	GS	MPG	FG%	3P%	FT%	RPG	APG	SPG	BPG	PPG
2020–21	Wyoming	25	24	**31.1**	.452	.330	.705	2.5	**4.3**	1.4	.2	14.8
2021–22	Texas A&M	27	25	24.5	.362	.283	.610	2.2	3.4	1.3	.1	7.9
2022–23	San Francisco	**34**	2	25.5	.410	.408	.740	3.2	2.8	.9	.1	7.8
2023–24	San Francisco	**34**	**34**	30.7	.456	.344	.672	3.3	3.9	1.4	.3	14.0
2024–25	San Francisco	31	31	30.8	**.483**	**.414**	**.744**	**3.6**	4.3	**1.5**	**.4**	**15.1**
Career		151	116	28.5	.440	.360	.703	3.0	3.7	1.3	.2	11.9

== Personal life ==
Williams' older brother, Faite, played college basketball for Prairie View A&M.
