= 2020–21 Air Force Falcons men's basketball team =

American college basketball season

2020–21 Air Force Falcons men's basketball
- Conference: Mountain West Conference
- Record: 5–20 (3–17 MW)
- Head coach: Joe Scott (5th overall, 1st straight season)
- Assistant coaches: Sydney Johnson; David Metzendorf; Jared Czech; Maj Marc Holum; Cam Griffin
- Home arena: Clune Arena

2020–21 Mountain West Conference men's basketball standings
| | Conf. | | | | Overall |
| Team | W | | L | PCT | W | | L | PCT |
|---|---|---|---|---|---|---|---|---|
| No. 16 San Diego State† | 14 | – | 3 | .824 | 23 | – | 5 | .821 |
| Utah State | 15 | – | 4 | .789 | 20 | – | 9 | .690 |
| Colorado State | 14 | – | 4 | .778 | 20 | – | 8 | .714 |
| Boise State | 14 | – | 6 | .700 | 19 | – | 9 | .679 |
| Nevada | 10 | – | 7 | .588 | 16 | – | 10 | .615 |
| Fresno State | 9 | – | 11 | .450 | 12 | – | 12 | .500 |
| UNLV | 8 | – | 10 | .444 | 12 | – | 15 | .444 |
| Wyoming | 7 | – | 9 | .438 | 14 | – | 11 | .560 |
| San Jose State | 3 | – | 13 | .188 | 5 | – | 16 | .238 |
| Air Force | 3 | – | 17 | .150 | 5 | – | 20 | .200 |
| New Mexico | 2 | – | 15 | .118 | 6 | – | 16 | .273 |
† Conference tournament winner Rankings from AP poll

The 2020–21 Air Force Falcons men's basketball team represented the United States Air Force Academy during the 2020–21 NCAA Division I men's basketball season. The Falcons, led by head coach Joe Scott making his return as head coach after previously coaching at Air Force from 2000 to 2004, played their home games at Clune Arena on the Air Force Academy's main campus in Colorado Springs, Colorado. Air Force finished 5–20, with a 3–17 record in Mountain West play, finishing in 9th place. They lost to UNLV in the first round of the Mountain West conference tournament.

== Previous season ==
The Falcons finished the season 12–20, 5–13 in Mountain West play to finish in ninth place. They defeated Fresno State in the first round of the Mountain West tournament before losing in the quarterfinals to San Diego State.

On March 9, 2020, head coach Dave Pilipovich was fired. He finished at Air Force with an eight-year record of 110–151.

== Roster ==
2020–21 Air Force Falcons men's basketball team
Players
Coaches

| Pos. | # | Name | Height | Weight | Year | Previous school | Hometown |
|---|---|---|---|---|---|---|---|
| G | 0 | Joseph Octave | 6 ft 4 in (1.93 m) | 200 lb (91 kg) | Fr | Mary Star of the Sea HS | Gardena, CA |
| G | 1 | Solomon Pierre-Louis | 6 ft 3 in (1.91 m) | 175 lb (79 kg) | So | The Wellington School | Columbus, OH |
| G | 2 | Glen McClintock | 6 ft 2 in (1.88 m) | 185 lb (84 kg) | Fr | Rockhurst HS | Kansas City, MO |
| G | 3 | Logan Morrissey | 6 ft 4 in (1.93 m) | 195 lb (88 kg) | Fr | Plant HS | Tampa, FL |
| G | 4 | Carter Murphy | 6 ft 4 in (1.93 m) | 190 lb (86 kg) | So | Arcadia HS | Phoenix, AZ |
| G | 5 | Chris Joyce | 6 ft 5 in (1.96 m) | 193 lb (88 kg) | Sr | Bishop Kenny HS | Jacksonville, FL |
| G | 10 | A. J. Walker | 6 ft 2 in (1.88 m) | 191 lb (87 kg) | Jr | St. Mary's Hall | San Antonio, TX |
| G | 11 | Ameka Akaya | 6 ft 6 in (1.98 m) | 215 lb (98 kg) | Sr | St. Maria Goretti HS | Hagerstown, MD |
| G | 12 | Christian Depollar | 6 ft 5 in (1.96 m) | 202 lb (92 kg) | Fr | St. Stephen's & St. Agnes School | Montgomery County, MD |
| F | 15 | Abe Kinrade | 6 ft 7 in (2.01 m) | 200 lb (91 kg) | Jr | Maquoketa HS | Maquoeketa, IA |
| G | 21 | Nick René | 6 ft 0 in (1.83 m) | 175 lb (79 kg) | Jr | Lakeview Centennial HS | Garland, TX |
| F | 22 | Nikc Jackson | 6 ft 8 in (2.03 m) | 195 lb (88 kg) | So | Rancho Solano HS | Scottsdale, AZ |
| G | 24 | Mason Taylor | 6 ft 4 in (1.93 m) | 185 lb (84 kg) | So | Grandview HS | Kansas City, MO |
| G | 30 | Camden Vander Zwaag | 6 ft 4 in (1.93 m) | 200 lb (91 kg) | So | Johnston HS | Johnson, IA |
| F | 31 | CJ Haut | 6 ft 8 in (2.03 m) | 200 lb (91 kg) | So | St. Mary's Prep | Monroe, WI |
| G | 32 | Simon Banks | 6 ft 1 in (1.85 m) | 185 lb (84 kg) | So | Brebeuf Jesuit Prep | Indianapolis, IN |
| G/F | 33 | Derek Dickenscheidt | 6 ft 6 in (1.98 m) | 190 lb (86 kg) | Fr | Cinco Ranch HS | Katy, TX |
| G | 34 | Kyle Brown | 6 ft 2 in (1.88 m) | 185 lb (84 kg) | Fr | La Cañada HS | La Cañada, CA |
| G | 44 | Keaton Van Soelen | 6 ft 7 in (2.01 m) | 190 lb (86 kg) | Sr | Des Moines Christian HS | Waukee, IA |

Head coach

- Joe Scott (Princeton)

Assistant coach(es)

- Sydney Johnson (Princeton)
- David Metzendorf (Ithaca)
- Jared Czech (Manhattanville)
- Maj Marc Holum (Air Force)
- Cam Griffin (Denver)

Legend

- (C) Team captain
- (S) Suspended
- (I) Ineligible
- (W) Walk-on
- Injured
- Current redshirt

Roster
Last update: November 29, 2020

== Schedule and results ==
| Date time, TV | Rank^{#} | Opponent^{#} | Result | Record | Site (attendance) city, state |
Regular season
| Nov 28, 2020*; 2:00 pm, FloSports | | vs. Cal State Northridge; Vegas Bubble | W 66–61 | 1–0 | T-Mobile Arena; Paradise, NV |
| Nov 29, 2020*; 1:00 pm, FloSports | | vs. Seattle; Vegas Bubble | L 45–63 | 1–1 | T-Mobile Arena; Paradise, NV |
| Dec 5, 2020*; 1:00 pm | | Lamar | W 59–43 | 2–1 | Clune Arena; Colorado Springs, CO |
| Dec 13, 2020*; 12:00 pm, ESPN+ | | at Drake | L 53–81 | 2–2 | Knapp Center (141); Des Moines, IA |
| Dec 18, 2020; 8:00 pm | | at Nevada | L 57–74 | 2–3 (0–1) | Lawlor Events Center; Reno, NV |
| Dec 20, 2020; 4:00 pm | | at Nevada | W 68–66 | 3–3 (1–1) | Lawlor Events Center; Reno, NV |
| Dec 31, 2020; 2:00 pm, CBSSN | | Utah State | L 48–83 | 3–4 (1–2) | Clune Arena; Colorado Springs, CO |
| Jan 2, 2021; 4:00 pm, Stadium | | Utah State | L 53–72 | 3–5 (1–3) | Clune Arena; Colorado Springs, CO |
| Jan 6, 2021; 9:00 pm, FS1 | | at Boise State | L 59–78 | 3–6 (1–4) | ExtraMile Arena; Boise, ID |
| Jan 8, 2021; 6:00 pm, Stadium | | at Boise State | L 69–80 | 3–7 (1–5) | Clune Arena; Colorado Springs, CO |
| Jan 16, 2021; 2:00 pm | | Wyoming | W 72–69 | 4–7 (2–5) | Clune Arena; Colorado Springs, CO |
| Jan 18, 2021; 7:00 pm | | Wyoming | L 58–77 | 4–8 (2–6) | Clune Arena; Colorado Springs, CO |
| Jan 22, 2021; 7:00 pm, FS1 | | San Diego State | L 61–98 | 4–9 (2–7) | Clune Arena; Colorado Springs, CO |
| Jan 24, 2021; 8:00 pm, FS1 | | San Diego State | L 59–91 | 4–10 (2–8) | Clune Arena; Colorado Springs, CO |
| Jan 28, 2021; 7:30 pm | | vs. San Jose State | L 58–59 | 4–11 (2–9) | Ability360; Phoenix, AZ |
| Jan 30, 2021; 4:00 pm | | vs. San Jose State | L 62–75 | 4–12 (2–10) | Ability360; Phoenix, AZ |
| Feb 6, 2021; 2:00 pm, CBSSN | | at UNLV | L 58–68 | 4–13 (2–11) | Thomas & Mack Center (50); Paradise, NV |
| Feb 8, 2021; 7:00 pm, CBSSN | | at UNLV | L 64–69 | 4–14 (2–12) | Thomas & Mack Center; Paradise, NV |
| Feb 11, 2021; 7:00 pm | | Fresno State | L 63–69 | 4–15 (2–13) | Clune Arena; Colorado Springs, CO |
| Feb 13, 2021; 1:00 pm | | Fresno State | L 64–67 | 4–16 (2–14) | Clune Arena; Colorado Springs, CO |
| Feb 22, 2021 | | New Mexico | L 65–73 | 4–17 (2–15) | Clune Arena; Colorado Springs, CO |
| Feb 24, 2021 | | New Mexico | W 62–55 | 5–17 (3–15) | Clune Arena; Colorado Springs, CO |
| Feb 27, 2021 | | at Colorado State | L 49–72 | 5–18 (3–16) | Moby Arena; Fort Collins, CO |
| Mar 1, 2021; CBSSN | | at Colorado State | L 44–74 | 5–19 (3–17) | Moby Arena; Fort Collins, CO |
Mountain West tournament
| Mar 10, 2021; 1:30 pm, Stadium | (10) | at (7) UNLV; First round | L 52–80 | 5–20 | Thomas & Mack Center; Paradise, NV |
*Non-conference game. ^{#}Rankings from AP Poll. (#) Tournament seedings in parentheses. All times are in Pacific Time.
