= 2020–21 Boise State Broncos men's basketball team =

American college basketball season

2020–21 Boise State Broncos men's basketball

NIT, Quarterfinals
- Conference: Mountain West Conference
- Record: 19–9 (14–6 MW)
- Head coach: Leon Rice (11th season)
- Assistant coaches: Mike Burns; Tim Duryea; R-Jay Barsh
- Home arena: ExtraMile Arena

2020–21 Mountain West Conference men's basketball standings
	Conf.				Overall
Team	W		L	PCT	W		L	PCT
No. 16 San Diego State†	14	–	3	.824	23	–	5	.821
Utah State	15	–	4	.789	20	–	9	.690
Colorado State	14	–	4	.778	20	–	8	.714
Boise State	14	–	6	.700	19	–	9	.679
Nevada	10	–	7	.588	16	–	10	.615
Fresno State	9	–	11	.450	12	–	12	.500
UNLV	8	–	10	.444	12	–	15	.444
Wyoming	7	–	9	.438	14	–	11	.560
San Jose State	3	–	13	.188	5	–	16	.238
Air Force	3	–	17	.150	5	–	20	.200
New Mexico	2	–	15	.118	6	–	16	.273
† Conference tournament winner Rankings from AP poll

The 2020–21 Boise State Broncos men's basketball team represented Boise State University during the 2020–21 NCAA Division I men's basketball season. The Broncos, led by 11th-year head coach Leon Rice, played their home games at ExtraMile Arena as members of the Mountain West Conference. They finished the season 19-9, 14-6 to finish in 4th place. They lost in the quarterfinals of the Mountain West tournament to Nevada. They received an invitation to the NIT where they defeated SMU in the first round before losing in the quarterfinals to Memphis.

== Previous season ==
The Broncos 20–12, 11–7 in Mountain West play to finish in a tie for fifth place. They defeated UNLV in the quarterfinals of the Mountain West tournament before losing in the semifinals to San Diego State.

== Roster ==
2020–21 Boise State Broncos men's basketball team
Players
Coaches

Pos.	#	Name	Height	Weight	Year	Previous school	Hometown
G	0	Marcus Shaver Jr.	6 ft 2 in (1.88 m)	185 lb (84 kg)	RS Jr	Shadow Mountain HS; Portland	Phoenix, AZ
G	1	Kasean Pryor	6 ft 9 in (2.06 m)	188 lb (85 kg)	Fr	Pioneer HS	Chicago, IL
F	4	Burke Smith	6 ft 11 in (2.11 m)	212 lb (96 kg)	Fr	Trinity Episcopal School	Glen Allen, VA
G	10	RayJ Dennis	6 ft 2 in (1.88 m)	177 lb (80 kg)	So	Oswego East HS	Oswego, IL
G	11	Devonaire Doutrive	6 ft 5 in (1.96 m)	185 lb (84 kg)	Jr	Birmingham HS; Arizona	Dallas, Texas
G	12	Max Rice (W)	6 ft 5 in (1.96 m)	194 lb (88 kg)	RS So	Bishop Kelly HS	Boise, ID
G	13	Pavle Kuzmanovic	6 ft 5 in (1.96 m)	175 lb (79 kg)	RS Fr	ABS Primorje 1945	Lužnica, Serbia
G	14	Emmanuel Akot	6 ft 8 in (2.03 m)	210 lb (95 kg)	RS Jr	Wasatch Academy; Arizona	Winnipeg, MB
G	15	Donovan Ivory	6 ft 6 in (1.98 m)	190 lb (86 kg)	RS So	Kaukauna HS; UMass Lowell	Appleton, WI
G	21	Derrick Alston Jr.	6 ft 9 in (2.06 m)	190 lb (86 kg)	RS Sr	Strake Jesuit HS	Houston, TX
G	22	Sam Winter	6 ft 2 in (1.88 m)	185 lb (84 kg)	Fr	Montesano HS	Montesano, WA
F	23	Naje Smith	6 ft 7 in (2.01 m)	201 lb (91 kg)	Jr	Lewis and Clark HS; Cochise College	Spokane, WA
F	24	Abu Kigab	6 ft 7 in (2.01 m)	220 lb (100 kg)	Jr	Prolific Prep; Oregon	St. Catharines, ON
C	25	Lukas Milner	6 ft 10 in (2.08 m)	225 lb (102 kg)	RS Jr	Olathe North HS	Olathe, KS
F	33	Mladen Armus	6 ft 10 in (2.08 m)	232 lb (105 kg)	RS Jr	Southwest Christian Academy; ETSU	Belgrade, Serbia

Head coach

- Leon Rice (Washington State)

Assistant coach(es)

- Mike Burns (Central Washington)
- Tim Duryea (North Texas)
- R-Jay Barsh (Puget Sound)

Legend

- (C) Team captain
- (S) Suspended
- (I) Ineligible
- (W) Walk-on
- Injured
- Current redshirt

Roster

== Schedule and results ==
Date time, TV	Rank^{#}	Opponent^{#}	Result	Record	Site (attendance) city, state
Regular season
Nov 27, 2020*; 1:00 pm, ESPN+		at No. 17 Houston; Southwest Showcase	L 58–68	0–1	Fertitta Center (1,859); Houston, TX
Nov 29, 2020*; 12:00 pm		vs. Sam Houston State; Southwest Showcase	W 86–55	1–1	Dickies Arena (3,568); Fort Worth, TX
Dec 4, 2020*; 5:00 pm		College of Idaho	W 86–49	2–1	ExtraMile Arena (0); Boise, ID
Dec 9, 2020*; 7:00 pm, BYUtv		at BYU	W 74–70	3–1	Marriott Center (0); Provo, UT
Dec 13, 2020*; 2:00 pm		Weber State	W 70–59	4–1	ExtraMile Arena (0); Boise, ID
Dec 21, 2020; 7:30 pm, FS1		New Mexico	W 77–53	5–1 (1–0)	ExtraMile Arena (0); Boise, ID
Dec 23, 2020; 8:00 pm, CBSSN		New Mexico	W 89–52	6–1 (2–0)	ExtraMile Arena (0); Boise, ID
Dec 31, 2020; 5:30 pm		vs. San Jose State	W 106–54	7–1 (3–0)	Ability360 (0); Phoenix, AZ
Jan 2, 2021; 4:30 pm, FS1		vs. San Jose State	W 87–86	8–1 (4–0)	GCU Arena (0); Phoenix, AZ
Jan 6, 2021; 9:00 pm, FS1		Air Force	W 78–59	9–1 (5–0)	ExtraMile Arena (0); Boise, ID
Jan 8, 2021; 6:00 pm, Stadium		Air Force	W 80–69	10–1 (6–0)	ExtraMile Arena (0); Boise, ID
Jan 11, 2021; 7:00 pm, CBSSN		at Wyoming	W 83–60	11–1 (7–0)	Arena-Auditorium (0); Laramie, WY
Jan 13, 2021; 7:00 pm, CBSSN		at Wyoming	W 90–70	12–1 (8–0)	Arena-Auditorium (0); Laramie, WY
Jan 20, 2021; 7:00 pm, FS1		Fresno State	W 73–51	13–1 (9–0)	ExtraMile Arena (0); Boise, ID
Jan 27, 2021; 7:00 pm, CBSSN		at Colorado State	L 56–78	13–2 (9–1)	Moby Arena; Fort Collins, CO
Jan 29, 2021; 9:00 pm, FS1		at Colorado State	W 85–77	14–2 (10–1)	Moby Arena (0); Fort Collins, CO
Feb 5, 2021; 7:00 pm, FS1		at Nevada	L 72–74	14–3 (10–2)	Lawlor Events Center (50); Reno, NV
Feb 7, 2021; 2:00 pm, FS1		at Nevada	L 62–73	14–4 (10–3)	Lawlor Events Center (50); Reno, NV
Feb 11, 2021; 8:00 pm, CBSSN		UNLV	W 78–66	15–4 (11–3)	ExtraMile Arena (0); Boise, ID
Feb 13, 2021; 8:00 pm, FS1		UNLV	W 61–59	16–4 (12–3)	ExtraMile Arena (0); Boise, ID
Feb 17, 2021; 7:00 pm, CBSSN		Utah State	W 79–70	17–4 (13–3)	ExtraMile Arena (679); Boise, ID
Feb 19, 2021; 8:00 pm, FS1		Utah State	W 81–77	18–4 (14–3)	ExtraMile Arena (872); Boise, ID
Feb 25, 2021; 7:00 pm, FS1		at No. 22 San Diego State	L 66–78 ^{OT}	18–5 (14–4)	Viejas Arena (0); San Diego, CA
Feb 27, 2021; 2:00 pm, CBSSN		at No. 22 San Diego State	L 58–62	18–6 (14–5)	Viejas Arena (0); San Diego, CA
Mar 2, 2021; 5:00 pm, CBSSN		Fresno State	L 64–67	18–7 (14–6)	ExtraMile Arena (799); Boise, ID
Mountain West tournament
Mar 11, 2021; 2:30 pm, CBSSN	(4)	vs. (5) Nevada; Quarterfinals	L 82–89	18–8	Thomas & Mack Center (0); Paradise, NV
NIT
Mar 18, 2021; 7:00 pm, ESPN	(2)	vs. (3) SMU; First Round – Memphis Bracket	W 85–84	19–8	Comerica Center (836); Frisco, TX
Mar 25, 2021; 7:00 pm, ESPN	(2)	vs. (1) Memphis; Quarterfinals – Memphis Bracket	L 56–59	19–9	The Super Pit (935); Denton, TX
*Non-conference game. ^{#}Rankings from AP Poll. (#) Tournament seedings in parentheses. All times are in Mountain Time Source.
