= 2020–21 San Jose State Spartans men's basketball team =

American college basketball season

2020–21 San Jose State Spartans men's basketball
- Conference: Mountain West Conference
- Record: 5–16 (3–13 MW)
- Head coach: Jean Prioleau (4th season)
- Assistant coaches: Will Kimble; Julius Hodge; Tim Marrion

2020–21 Mountain West Conference men's basketball standings
	Conf.				Overall
Team	W		L	PCT	W		L	PCT
No. 16 San Diego State†	14	–	3	.824	23	–	5	.821
Utah State	15	–	4	.789	20	–	9	.690
Colorado State	14	–	4	.778	20	–	8	.714
Boise State	14	–	6	.700	19	–	9	.679
Nevada	10	–	7	.588	16	–	10	.615
Fresno State	9	–	11	.450	12	–	12	.500
UNLV	8	–	10	.444	12	–	15	.444
Wyoming	7	–	9	.438	14	–	11	.560
San Jose State	3	–	13	.188	5	–	16	.238
Air Force	3	–	17	.150	5	–	20	.200
New Mexico	2	–	15	.118	6	–	16	.273
† Conference tournament winner Rankings from AP poll

The 2020–21 San Jose State Spartans men's basketball team represented San Jose State University in the 2020–21 NCAA Division I men's basketball season. They were led by fourth-year head coach Jean Prioleau and were members of the Mountain West Conference. Due to COVID-19 restrictions in Santa Clara County, the Spartans could not play their home games at their normal home arena, Provident Credit Union Event Center, and played their "home" games at different locations.

== Previous season ==
The Spartans finished the season 7–24, 3–15 in Mountain West play to finish in tenth place. They lost in the first round of the Mountain West tournament to New Mexico.

== Roster ==
2020–21 San Jose State Spartans men's basketball team
Players
Coaches

Pos.	#	Name	Height	Weight	Year	Previous school	Hometown
G	1	Caleb Simmons	6 ft 6 in (1.98 m)	195 lb (88 kg)	RS Jr	Desert Vista HS	Vallejo, California
G	2	Jalen Dalcourt	6 ft 2 in (1.88 m)	170 lb (77 kg)	Jr	Lafayette HS; Iowa Western CC	Lafayette, Louisiana
G	4	Sebastian Mendoza	6 ft 3 in (1.91 m)	195 lb (88 kg)	Fr	Hillcrest HS	Riverside, California
C	5	Hugo Clarkin	7 ft 0 in (2.13 m)	215 lb (98 kg)	Fr	JSerra Catholic HS	Las Flores, California
F	10	Omari Moore	6 ft 6 in (1.98 m)	190 lb (86 kg)	So	Pasadena HS	Pasadena, California
G	11	Richard Washington	6 ft 6 in (1.98 m)	200 lb (91 kg)	Sr	Walsingham Academy; Tallahassee CC	Newport News, Virginia
G	12	Eduardo Lane	6 ft 11 in (2.11 m)	240 lb (109 kg)	Sr	Campinas HS; Marshalltown CC	Aquidauana, Brazil
G	13	Seneca Knight	6 ft 7 in (2.01 m)	215 lb (98 kg)	Jr	Northside HS	Lafayette, Louisiana
G	21	Kaison Hammonds	6 ft 4 in (1.93 m)	180 lb (82 kg)	Jr	ThunderRidge HS	Highlands Ranch, Colorado
G	22	Nate Lacewell	6 ft 9 in (2.06 m)	195 lb (88 kg)	Fr	Legacy Sports Sciences HS	Missouri City, Texas
F	24	Michael Ofoegbu	6 ft 7 in (2.01 m)	205 lb (93 kg)	Fr	Mayfair HS	Lakewood, California
F	35	Ralph Agee	6 ft 8 in (2.03 m)	220 lb (100 kg)	Sr	Silverado HS; East Los Angeles CC	Victorville, California
F	40	Chase Courtney	6 ft 10 in (2.08 m)	230 lb (104 kg)	Fr	Pinnacle HS	Scottsdale, Arizona
G	44	Trey Smith (W)	6 ft 3 in (1.91 m)	195 lb (88 kg)	Jr	Saddleback Valley Christian HS	Cypress, California
C	50	Harminder Dhaliwal (W)	6 ft 10 in (2.08 m)	235 lb (107 kg)	So	Aliso Niguel HS	Laguna Niguel, California

Head coach

- Jean Prioleau (Fordham)

Assistant coach(es)

- Will Kimble (Pepperdine)
- Julius Hodge (NC State)
- Tim Marrion (Washington State)

Legend

- (C) Team captain
- (S) Suspended
- (I) Ineligible
- (W) Walk-on
- Injured
- Current redshirt

Roster
Last update: November 20, 2020

== Schedule and results ==
Date time, TV	Rank^{#}	Opponent^{#}	Result	Record	Site (attendance) city, state
Regular season
Dec 6, 2020*		Pacific	Canceled due to COVID-19		Provident Credit Union Event Center; San Jose, CA
Dec 9, 2020*; 5:00 pm		vs. Fresno Pacific	W 87–79	1–0	Kaiser Permanente Arena; Santa Cruz, CA
Dec 11, 2020*; 7:00 pm		at Saint Mary's	L 61–96	1–1	University Credit Union Pavilion; Moraga, CA
Dec 13, 2020*; 1:00 pm		at Cal Poly	L 71–73	1–2	Mott Athletics Center; San Luis Obispo, CA
Dec 21, 2020; 6:00 pm		at Utah State	L 62–107	1–3 (0–1)	Smith Spectrum (1,354); Logan, UT
Dec 23, 2020; 6:00 pm		at Utah State	L 52–85	1–4 (0–2)	Smith Spectrum (1,151); Logan, UT
Dec 31, 2020; 4:30 pm		vs. Boise State	L 54–106	1–5 (0–3)	Ability360; Phoenix, AZ
Jan 2, 2021; 5:30 pm, FS1		vs. Boise State	L 86–87	1–6 (0–4)	GCU Arena; Phoenix, AZ
Jan 4, 2021*; 7:30 pm		vs. Benedictine Mesa	W 80–64	2–6	Ability360; Phoenix, AZ
Jan 8, 2021; 6:00 pm		at Fresno State	L 64–79	2–7 (0–5)	Save Mart Center; Fresno, CA
Jan 10, 2021; 6:00 pm		at Fresno State	L 65–80	2–8 (0–6)	Save Mart Center; Fresno, CA
Jan 14, 2021; 6:30 pm		vs. Colorado State	L 57–90	2–9 (0–7)	Ability360; Phoenix, AZ
Jan 16, 2021; 3:00 pm		vs. Colorado State	L 61–88	2–10 (0–8)	Ability360; Phoenix, AZ
Jan 21, 2021; 12:00 pm		vs. New Mexico	L 51–67	2–11 (0–9)	Burns Arena; St. George, UT
Jan 23, 2021; 11:00 am		vs. New Mexico	W 83–71	3–11 (1–9)	Burns Arena; St. George, UT
Jan 28, 2021; 6:30 pm		vs. Air Force	W 59–58	4–11 (2–9)	Ability360; Phoenix, AZ
Jan 30, 2021; 3:00 pm		vs. Air Force	W 75–62	5–11 (3–9)	Ability360; Phoenix, AZ
Feb 8, 2021; 8:00 pm, FS1		at San Diego State	L 54–85	5–12 (3–10)	Viejas Arena; San Diego, CA
Feb 10, 2021; 8:00 pm, CBSSN		at San Diego State	L 55–77	5–13 (3–11)	Viejas Arena; San Diego, CA
Feb 13, 2021		Nevada	Canceled due to COVID-19 issues		Provident Credit Union Event Center; San Jose, CA
Feb 15, 2021; 5:00 pm, Stadium		Nevada	Canceled due to COVID-19 issues		Provident Credit Union Event Center; San Jose, CA
Feb 19, 2021; 6:30 pm, Stadium		UNLV	L 60–76	5–14 (3–12)	Provident Credit Union Event Center; San Jose, CA
Feb 21, 2021; CBSSN		UNLV	L 64–67	5–15 (3–13)	Provident Credit Union Event Center; San Jose, CA
Feb 25, 2021; 6:00 pm		at Wyoming	Canceled due to COVID-19 issues		Arena-Auditorium; Laramie, WY
Feb 27, 2021; 1:00 pm		at Wyoming	Canceled due to COVID-19 issues		Arena-Auditorium; Laramie, WY
Mountain West tournament
Mar 10, 2021; 11:00 am, Stadium	(9)	vs. (8) Wyoming; First round	L 80–111	5–16	Thomas & Mack Center; Paradise, NV
*Non-conference game. ^{#}Rankings from AP Poll. (#) Tournament seedings in parentheses. All times are in Pacific Time.
