= 2020–21 Fresno State Bulldogs men's basketball team =

American college basketball season

2020–21 Fresno State Bulldogs men's basketball
- Conference: Mountain West Conference
- Record: 12–12 (9–11 MW)
- Head coach: Justin Hutson (3rd season)
- Assistant coaches: Keith Brown; Tarvish Felton; Tim Shelton
- Home arena: Save Mart Center (Capacity: 15,596)

2020–21 Mountain West Conference men's basketball standings
	Conf.				Overall
Team	W		L	PCT	W		L	PCT
No. 16 San Diego State†	14	–	3	.824	23	–	5	.821
Utah State	15	–	4	.789	20	–	9	.690
Colorado State	14	–	4	.778	20	–	8	.714
Boise State	14	–	6	.700	19	–	9	.679
Nevada	10	–	7	.588	16	–	10	.615
Fresno State	9	–	11	.450	12	–	12	.500
UNLV	8	–	10	.444	12	–	15	.444
Wyoming	7	–	9	.438	14	–	11	.560
San Jose State	3	–	13	.188	5	–	16	.238
Air Force	3	–	17	.150	5	–	20	.200
New Mexico	2	–	15	.118	6	–	16	.273
† Conference tournament winner Rankings from AP poll

The 2020–21 Fresno State Bulldogs men's basketball team represented California State University, Fresno in the 2020–21 NCAA Division I men's basketball season. The Bulldogs were led by third-year head coach Justin Hutson and played their home games at the Save Mart Center as members of the Mountain West Conference.

== Previous season ==
The Bulldogs finished the season 11–19, 7–11 in Mountain West play to finish in a tie for seventh place. They lost in the first round of the Mountain West tournament to Air Force.

== Roster ==
2020–21 Fresno State Bulldogs men's basketball team
Players
Coaches

Pos.	#	Name	Height	Weight	Year	Previous school	Hometown
G	0	Kyle Harding	6 ft 3 in (1.91 m)	185 lb (84 kg)	So	Allan Hancock College	Long Island, New York
G	1	Devin Gage	6 ft 2 in (1.88 m)	205 lb (93 kg)	Sr	DePaul	Chicago, Illinois
G	3	Isaiah Hill	6 ft 0 in (1.83 m)	165 lb (75 kg)	So	Tulsa	Bakersfield, California
G	4	Junior Ballard	6 ft 3 in (1.91 m)	185 lb (84 kg)	Jr	Cal Poly	Stockton, California
G	5	Jordan Campbell	6 ft 4 in (1.93 m)	195 lb (88 kg)	So	Oregon State	Adelanto, California
F	10	Orlando Robinson	7 ft 0 in (2.13 m)	235 lb (107 kg)	So	Middlebrooks Academy	Las Vegas, Nevada
F	11	Christian Gray	6 ft 6 in (1.98 m)	250 lb (113 kg)	RS Sr	Salt Lake CC	Moreno Valley, California
G	13	Deon Stroud	6 ft 5 in (1.96 m)	200 lb (91 kg)	So	UTEP	Fresno, California
G	20	Alec Hickman (W)	6 ft 4 in (1.93 m)	190 lb (86 kg)	RS Jr	East LA College	Riverside, California
C	21	Assane Diouf	7 ft 2 in (2.18 m)	250 lb (113 kg)	RS So	DME Academy	Dakar, Senegal
G	22	Destin Whitaker	6 ft 5 in (1.96 m)	185 lb (84 kg)	Fr	Romeoville HS	Romeoville, Illinois
G/F	23	Leo Colimerio	6 ft 7 in (2.01 m)	190 lb (86 kg)	Fr	Wasatch Academy	São Paulo, Brazil
G	25	Antony Holland	6 ft 5 in (1.96 m)	225 lb (102 kg)	So	Notre Dame HS	Riverside, California
C	34	Braxton Meah	7 ft 1 in (2.16 m)	250 lb (113 kg)	Fr	San Joaquin Memorial HS	Fresno, California

Head coach

- Justin Hutson (Cal State Bakersfield)

Assistant coach(es)

- Keith Brown (Pacific)
- Tarvish Felton (Southern Utah)
- Tim Shelton (San Diego State)

Legend

- (C) Team captain
- (S) Suspended
- (I) Ineligible
- (W) Walk-on
- Injured
- Current redshirt

Roster

== Schedule and results ==
On November 29, Fresno State paused activities until December 13 due to multiple Covid-19 positive tests, cancelling five games.

Date time, TV	Rank^{#}	Opponent^{#}	Result	Record	High points	High rebounds	High assists	Site (attendance) city, state
Regular season
November 25, 2020*; 3:00 pm, KMSG		William Jessup	W 87–47	1–0	16 – Tied	10 – Robinson	3 – Gage	Save Mart Center; Fresno, CA
December 19, 2020*; 4:00 pm, KMSG		Fresno Pacific	W 78–65	2–0	17 – Ballard	10 – Holland	6 – Hill	Save Mart Center; Fresno, CA
December 28, 2020; 5:00 pm		at Colorado State	L 53–75	2–1 (0–1)	14 – Robinson	10 – Robinson	2 – Tied	Moby Arena; Fort Collins, CA
December 30, 2020; 1:00 pm		at Colorado State	L 59–81	2–2 (0–2)	19 – Robinson	15 – Robinson	4 – Hill	Moby Arena; Fresno, CA
January 2, 2021; 4:00 pm		Wyoming	L 74–78	2–3 (0–3)	19 – Stroud	9 – Holland	3 – Tied	Save Mart Center; Fresno, CA
January 4, 2021; 6:00 pm		Wyoming	W 81–61	3–3 (1–3)	33 – Robinson	13 – Robinson	3 – Hill	Save Mart Center; Fresno, CA
January 8, 2021; 6:00 pm		San Jose State	W 79–64	4–3 (2–3)	23 – Robinson	14 – Robinson	5 – Hill	Save Mart Center; Fresno, CA
January 10, 2021; 4:00 pm		San Jose State	W 80–65	5–3 (3–3)	22 – Stroud	9 – Campbell	6 – Robinson	Save Mart Center; Fresno, CA
January 15, 2021; 8:00 pm, FS1		at Nevada	L 57–73	5–4 (3–4)	15 – Tied	6 – Robinson	4 – Hill	Lawlor Events Center (50); Reno, NV
January 17, 2021; 1:00 pm, CBSSN		at Nevada	L 65–79	5–5 (3–5)	15 – Robinson	8 – Robinson	3 – Hill	Lawlor Events Center (50); Reno, NV
January 20, 2021; 6:00 pm, FS1		at Boise State	L 51–73	5–6 (3–6)	17 – Robinson	9 – Robinson	3 – Hill	ExtraMile Arena; Boise, ID
January 22, 2021; 6:00 pm, CBSSN		at Boise State	Postponed due to COVID-19 issues					ExtraMile Arena; Boise, ID
January 28, 2021; 8:00 pm, CBSSN		New Mexico	W 64–62 ^{OT}	6–6 (4–6)	18 – Ballard	16 – Robinson	5 – Hill	Save Mart Center; Fresno, CA
January 30, 2021; 4:00 pm		New Mexico	W 65–55	7–6 (5–6)	16 – Ballard	7 – Stroud	5 – Hill	Save Mart Center; Fresno, CA
February 4, 2021; 6:00 pm, Stadium		Utah State	L 53–69	7–7 (5–7)	9 – Gray	5 – Robinson	6 – Robinson	Save Mart Center; Fresno, CA
February 6, 2021; 7:00 pm, FS1		Utah State	Postponed due to COVID-19 issues					Save Mart Center; Fresno, CA
February 11, 2021; 6:00 pm		at Air Force	W 69–63	8–7 (6–7)	17 – Ballard	6 – Robinson	2 – 3 tied	Clune Arena; Colorado Springs, CO
February 13, 2021; 12:00 pm		at Air Force	W 67–64	9–7 (7–7)	21 – Robinson	11 – Robinson	2 – Colimerio	Clune Arena; Colorado Springs, CO
February 18, 2021; 7:00 pm, CBSSN		No. 25 San Diego State	L 53–67	9–8 (7–8)	17 – Robinson	13 – Robinson	4 – Robinson	Save Mart Center; Fresno, CA
February 20, 2021; 4:30 pm, CBSSN		No. 25 San Diego State	L 57–75	9–9 (7–9)	17 – Stroud	7 – Stroud	4 – Hill	Save Mart Center; Fresno, CA
February 24, 2021; 8:00 pm, FS1		at UNLV	W 67–64	10–9 (8–9)	18 – Stroud/Hill	8 – Holland	7 – Hill	Thomas & Mack Center; Paradise, NV
February 26, 2021; 8:00 pm, CBSSN		at UNLV	L 67–68	10–10 (8–10)	17 – Ballard	5 – Robinson	5 – Robinson	Thomas & Mack Center; Paradise, NV
Mar 2, 2021; 5:00 pm, CBSSN		at Boise State	W 67–64	11–10 (9–10)	16 – Stroud	10 – Hill	3 – Hill	ExtraMile Arena; Boise, ID
Mar 6, 2021; 9:00 pm, FS1		Utah State	L 51-57	11-11 (9-11)	16 – Hill	11 – Robinson	5 – Hill	Save Mart Center; Fresno, CA
Mountain West tournament
March 10, 2021; 4:00 pm, Stadium	(6)	vs. (11) New Mexico; First Round	W 85-77	12-11	19 – Stroud	12 – Robinson	6 – Holland	Thomas & Mack Center; Paradise, NV
March 11, 2021; 8:30 pm, CBSSN	(6)	vs. (3) Colorado State; Quarterfinals	L 62-72	12-12	16 – Robinson	10 – Robinson	4 – Robinson	Thomas & Mack Center; Paradise, NV
*Non-conference game. ^{#}Rankings from AP Poll. (#) Tournament seedings in parentheses. All times are in Pacific Time.
