= 2021 Mountain West Conference men's basketball tournament =

- Classification: Division I
- Season: 2020–21
- Teams: 11
- Site: Thomas & Mack Center; Paradise, Nevada
- Champions: San Diego State (6th title)
- Winning coach: Brian Dutcher (2nd title)
- MVP: Matt Mitchell (San Diego State)
- Television: Stadium/MWN, CBSSN, CBS

2020–21 Mountain West Conference men's basketball standings
	Conf.				Overall
Team	W		L	PCT	W		L	PCT
No. 16 San Diego State†	14	–	3	.824	23	–	5	.821
Utah State	15	–	4	.789	20	–	9	.690
Colorado State	14	–	4	.778	20	–	8	.714
Boise State	14	–	6	.700	19	–	9	.679
Nevada	10	–	7	.588	16	–	10	.615
Fresno State	9	–	11	.450	12	–	12	.500
UNLV	8	–	10	.444	12	–	15	.444
Wyoming	7	–	9	.438	14	–	11	.560
San Jose State	3	–	13	.188	5	–	16	.238
Air Force	3	–	17	.150	5	–	20	.200
New Mexico	2	–	15	.118	6	–	16	.273
† Conference tournament winner Rankings from AP poll

The 2021 Mountain West Conference men's basketball tournament was the postseason men's basketball tournament for the Mountain West Conference. It was held on March 10–13, 2021 at the Thomas & Mack Center on the campus of University of Nevada, Las Vegas, in Las Vegas, Nevada. The tournament champion, San Diego State, received the Mountain West's automatic bid to the NCAA tournament.

== Seeds ==
All 11 MW schools were eligible to participate in the tournament. Teams were seeded by conference record with a tiebreaker system to seed teams with identical percentages. The top five teams received byes into the tournament quarterfinals. The remaining teams played in the first round. Tie-breaking procedures remained unchanged from the 2020 tournament.

- Head-to-head record between the tied teams
- Record against the highest-seeded team not involved in the tie, going down through the seedings as necessary
- Higher NET

Seed	School	Conf	Tiebreaker(s)
1	San Diego State	14-3	
2	Utah State	15–4	
3	Colorado State	14–4	
4	Boise State	14–6	
5	Nevada	10–7	
6	Fresno State	9–11	
7	UNLV	8–10	
8	Wyoming	7–9	
9	San Jose State	3–13	
10	Air Force	3–17	
11	New Mexico	2–15	

== Schedule ==
Game	Time	Matchup	Score	Television	Attendance
First round – Wednesday, March 10
1	11:00 am	No. 8 Wyoming vs. No. 9 San Jose State	111–80	Stadium/MWN	
2	1:30 pm	No. 7 UNLV vs. No. 10 Air Force	80–52	Stadium/MWN	
3	4:00 pm	No. 6 Fresno State vs. No. 11 New Mexico	85–77	Stadium/MWN	
Quarterfinals – Thursday, March 11
4	12:00 pm	No. 1 San Diego State vs. No. 8 Wyoming	69–66	CBSSN	
5	2:30 pm	No. 4 Boise State vs. No. 5 Nevada	82–89	CBSSN	
6	6:00 pm	No. 2 Utah State vs. No. 7 UNLV	74–53	CBSSN	
7	8:30 pm	No. 3 Colorado State vs. No. 6 Fresno State	72–62	CBSSN	
Semifinals – Friday, March 12
8	6:30 pm	No. 1 San Diego State vs. No. 5 Nevada	77–70	CBSSN	
9	9:00 pm	No. 2 Utah State vs. No. 3 Colorado State	62–50	CBSSN	
Championship – Saturday, March 13
10	3:00 pm	No. 1 San Diego State vs. No. 2 Utah State	68–57	CBS	
Game times in PT. Rankings denote tournament seeding.

== Bracket ==
First round Wednesday, March 10; Stadium/MWN
8	Wyoming	111
9	San Jose State	80
7	UNLV	80
10	Air Force	52
6	Fresno State	85
11	New Mexico	77

Quarterfinals; Thursday, March 11; CBSSN
1	#19 San Diego State	69
8	Wyoming	66
4	Boise State	82
5	Nevada	89
2	Utah State	74
7	UNLV	53
3	Colorado State	72
6	Fresno State	62

Semifinals; Friday, March 12; CBSSN
1	#19 San Diego State	77
5	Nevada	70
2	Utah State	62
3	Colorado State	50

Championship; Saturday, March 13; CBS
1	#19 San Diego State	68
2	Utah State	57

* denotes overtime period
