= NJCAA Division I women's basketball championship =

- Founded: 1975
- Region: 24
- Teams: 169
- Current champions: Eastern Arizona College (2026)
- Most championships: Trinity Valley CC (8)
- Website: https://www.njcaa.org/sports/wbkb/2024-25/div1/index

The NJCAA Division I women's basketball championship is an American intercollegiate basketball tournament conducted by the National Junior College Athletic Association (NJCAA), and determines the Division I women's national champion. The current champion is Northwest Florida State College who defeated Trinity Valley Community College on March 27, 2023 to capture the 2023 Championship and their second national championship. The tournament has been held since 1975. The most successful program, Trinity Valley Community College, has won the tournament eight times, including three straight championships from 2012-2015. From 1998-2014, the tournament was hosted at Bicentennial Center in Salina, Kansas. Since 2016, the tournament is held at Rip Griffin Center, on the campus of former NJCAA member Lubbock Christian University, in Lubbock, Texas.

== Format ==
The tournament consists of the top 24 teams with 8 teams receiving a bye in the first round.

== Championships ==
Year	Winner	Runner up	Score
1975	Temple Junior College	North Iowa Area Community College	59-58
1976	Seminole Junior College	Jackson Community College	83-74
1977	Panola College	Seminole Junior College	69-68
1978	Panola College	East Mississippi Community College	67-63
1979	Northern Oklahoma College	Tyler Junior College	74-52
1980	Truett-McConnell College	Cloud County Community College	63-61
1981	Louisburg College	Moberly Area Community College	65-63
1982	Moberly Junior College	Louisburg College	73-72
1983	Northwest Mississippi Community College	Cumberland College of Tennessee	75-69
1984	Roane State Community College	Northwest Mississippi Community College	69-53
1985	Connors State College	Odessa College	73-71
1986	Odessa College	Northeast Mississippi Junior College	80-69
1987	Northeast Mississippi Junior College	St. Gregory's Community College	68-64
1988	Kilgore College	John A. Logan College	78-71
1989	Central Arizona College	Connors State College	77-57
1990	Kilgore College	Emmanuel College	84-75
1991	Odessa College	Palm Beach State College	88-83
1992	Louisburg College	Central Florida Community College	104-89
1993	Kilgore College	Louisburg College	104-99
1994	Trinity Valley Community College	Westark Community College	104-95
1995	Westark Community College	Trinity Valley Community College	82-75
1996	Trinity Valley Community College	Independence Community College	69-55
1997	Trinity Valley Community College	Central Florida Community College	79-69
1998	Central Arizona College	Trinity Valley Community College	76-63
1999	Trinity Valley Community College	Central Arizona College	77-53
2000	Tyler Junior College	Southwestern Illinois College	57-39
2001	Cloud County Community College	Midland College	71-56
2002	Seward County Community College	Northeastern Oklahoma A&M College	87-80
2003	Gulf Coast Community College	Western Nebraska Community College	81-42
2004	Trinity Valley Community College	Gulf Coast Community College	77-66
2005	Central Arizona College	College of Southern Idaho	83-50
2006	Monroe Community College	Odessa College	76-64
2007	Odessa College	Central Arizona College	73-50
2008	Gulf Coast Community College	Central Arizona College	62-61
2009	Central Arizona College	Jefferson College	78-71
2010	Gulf Coast Community College	Jefferson College (Missouri)	83-61
2011	North Idaho College	Trinity Valley Community College	90-81
2012	Trinity Valley Community College	Hutchinson Community College	69-55
2013	Trinity Valley Community College	Central Arizona College	83-71
2014	Trinity Valley Community College	Hutchinson Community College	65-46
2015	Chipola College	Hutchinson Community College	54-46
2016	Gulf Coast State College	Trinity Valley Community College	63-47
2017	Gulf Coast State College	Trinity Valley Community College	87-63
2018	Tallahassee Community College	Trinity Valley Community College	69-51
2019	Gulf Coast State College	New Mexico Junior College	68-62
2020	Tournament cancelled due to COVID-19 pandemic		
2021	Northwest Florida State College	Trinity Valley Community College	67-60
2022	Tyler Junior College	Georgia Highlands College	90-82
2023	Northwest Florida State College	Trinity Valley Community College	66-63
2024	Hutchinson Community College	Northwest Florida State College	88-80 OT
2025	Northwest Florida State College	Shelton State Community College	62-53
2026	Eastern Arizona College	New Mexico Junior College	57-51

== Championship leaders ==
Team	Championships	Winning year(s)
Trinity Valley Community College	8	1994, 1996, 1997, 1999, 2004, 2012, 2013, 2014
Gulf Coast Community College	6	2003, 2008, 2010, 2016, 2017, 2019
Northwest Florida State College	3	2021, 2023, 2025
Odessa College	3	1986, 1991, 2007
Kilgore College	3	1988, 1990, 1993
Tyler Junior College	2	2000, 2022
Louisburg College	2	1981, 1992
Panola College	2	1977, 1978
Hutchinson Community College	1	2024
Eastern Arizona College	1	2026

== See also ==
- NAIA women's basketball championship
- NCAA Division I women's basketball tournament
- NJCAA Division I men's basketball championship
