= Rip Griffin Center =

Arena at Lubbock Christian University in Texas

- "The Rip"
- Interactive map of Rip Griffin Center
- Coordinates: 33.57186°N 101.93188°W
- Owner: Lubbock Christian University
- Operator: Lubbock Christian University
- Capacity: 1,950

Construction
- Opened: 2000
- Cost: $4,200,000

Tenants
- Lubbock Christian Chaparrals; NJCAA Division I Women's Basketball Championship (2016–present)

The Rip Griffin Center is an indoor arena on the campus of Lubbock Christian University in Lubbock, Texas. The 1,950-seat arena opened in 2000 and is named in honor of former LCU board of trustees member Bobbie Ray "Rip" Griffin (1929–2017), a native of Matador, Texas, who became a prominent Lubbock businessman and philanthropist.

Griffin founded Rip Griffin Truck Stops, which began with a single operation in Lubbock and spread throughout the American West. The company expanded into the fields of fuel wholesaling and truck dealerships. He further served on numerous civic and bank boards and donated to academic and athletic programs at Texas Tech University as well as LCU. A lifelong baseball enthusiast, Griffin is honored with the naming of the Rip Griffin Baseball Park on the Tech campus. The Geneva Griffin Center at the Children's Home of Lubbock is named in honor of Mrs. Griffin. For four decades, Griffin sponsored the Lubbock Hubber baseball club, a semi-professional team. Griffin once noted that hosting tournaments had varying consequences with more people visiting Lubbock and "they’re going to stay in our hotels, they’re going to eat in our restaurants, and best of all, they’re going to buy gasoline."

Rip Griffin Center is the home court of the Lubbock Christian Chaparrals basketball and volleyball teams. While LCU was a member, the Sooner Athletic Conference was held at the arena. The NJCAA Division I Women's Basketball Championship has been held at the arena since 2016.

== Events ==
- NCAA Division II Women's Basketball South Central Regional (2016)
- NJCAA Division I Women's Basketball Championship (2016, 2017, 2018)
- Oklahoma Sooners Athletic Conference Basketball Championships
