= Big West Conference men's basketball tournament =

American college basketball conference championship

Big West men's basketball tournament
- Conference basketball championship
- Sport: College basketball
- Conference: Big West Conference (1989–present); Pacific Coast Athletic Association (1976–1988)
- Number of teams: 8
- Format: Single-elimination tournament
- Current stadium: Lee's Family Forum
- Current location: Henderson, NV
- Played: 1976–present
- Last contest: 2026
- Current champion: Hawai'i
- Most championships: UNLV (7)

The Big West men's basketball tournament (formerly the Pacific Coast Athletic Association men's basketball tournament) is the conference championship tournament in basketball for the Big West Conference.

It is a single-elimination tournament and seeding is based on regular season records. Only the top eight teams in the conference qualify for the tournament. The winner receives the conference's automatic bid to the NCAA Men's Division I Basketball Championship. Prior to rebranding itself as the Big West in 1988, it was known as the PCAA (Pacific Coast Athletic Association) Tournament for the conference's former name.

== Results ==
=== Pacific Coast Athletic Association ===
Year	Champion	Score	Runner-up	Tournament MVP	Location
1976	San Diego State	76–64	Pacific	None Selected	Stockton Civic Auditorium (Stockton, California)
1977	Long Beach State	76–63	San Jose State	None Selected	Anaheim Convention Center (Anaheim, California)
1978	Cal State Fullerton	64–53	Long Beach State	Greg Bunch, Cal State Fullerton	Anaheim Convention Center (Anaheim, California)
1979	Pacific	82–73	Utah State	Ron Cornelius, Pacific	Anaheim Convention Center (Anaheim, California)
1980	San Jose State	57–55	Long Beach State	Wally Rank, San Jose State	Anaheim Convention Center (Anaheim, California)
1981	Fresno State	52–48	San Jose State	Sid Williams, San Jose State	Anaheim Convention Center (Anaheim, California)
1982	Fresno State	69–57	Cal State Fullerton	Donald Mason, Fresno State	Anaheim Convention Center (Anaheim, California)
1983	UNLV	66–63 (OT)	Fresno State	Sidney Green, UNLV	Inglewood Forum (Inglewood, California)
1984	Fresno State	51–49	UNLV	Richie Adams, UNLV	Inglewood Forum (Inglewood, California)
1985	UNLV	79–61	Cal State Fullerton	Richie Adams, UNLV	Inglewood Forum (Inglewood, California)
1986	UNLV	75–55	New Mexico State	Anthony Jones, UNLV	Inglewood Forum (Inglewood, California)
1987	UNLV	94–69	San Jose State	Freddie Banks, UNLV	Inglewood Forum (Inglewood, California)
1988	Utah State	86–79	UC Irvine	Wayne Engelstad, UC Irvine	Inglewood Forum (Inglewood, California)

=== Big West Conference ===
Year	Champion	Score	Runner-up	Tournament MVP	Location
1989	UNLV	68–62	New Mexico State	Stacey Augmon, UNLV	Long Beach Arena (Long Beach, California)
1990	UNLV	92–74	Long Beach State	Larry Johnson, UNLV	Long Beach Arena (Long Beach, California)
1991	UNLV	98–74	Fresno State	Larry Johnson, UNLV	Long Beach Arena (Long Beach, California)
1992	New Mexico State	74–73	Pacific	Sam Crawford, New Mexico State	Long Beach Arena (Long Beach, California)
1993	Long Beach State	70–62	New Mexico State	Lucious Harris, Long Beach State	Long Beach Arena (Long Beach, California)
1994	New Mexico State	70–64	UC Irvine	Chris Brown, UC Irvine & James Dockery, New Mexico State	Thomas & Mack Center (Paradise, Nevada)
1995	Long Beach State	76–69 (OT)	Nevada	Brian Green, Nevada	Thomas & Mack Center (Paradise, Nevada)
1996	San Jose State	76–75 (OT)	Utah State	Olivier Saint-Jean, San Jose State	Lawlor Events Center (Reno, Nevada)
1997	Pacific	63–55	Nevada	Corey Anders, Pacific & Faron Hand, Nevada	Lawlor Events Center (Reno, Nevada)
1998	Utah State	78–63	Pacific	Marcus Saxon, Utah State	Lawlor Events Center (Reno, Nevada)
1999	New Mexico State	79–69	Boise State	Billy Keys, New Mexico State	Lawlor Events Center (Reno, Nevada)
2000	Utah State	71–66	New Mexico State	Shawn Daniels & Troy Rolle, Utah State	Lawlor Events Center (Reno, Nevada)
2001	Utah State	50–38	Pacific	Bernard Rock, Utah State	Anaheim Convention Center (Anaheim, California)
2002	UC Santa Barbara	60–56	Utah State	Nick Jones, UC Santa Barbara	Anaheim Convention Center (Anaheim, California)
2003	Utah State	57–54	Cal Poly	Desmond Penigar, Utah State	Anaheim Convention Center (Anaheim, California)
2004	Pacific	75–73	Cal State Northridge	Ian Boylan, Cal State Northridge	Anaheim Convention Center (Anaheim, California)
2005	Utah State	65–52	Pacific	Jaycee Carroll, Utah State	Anaheim Convention Center (Anaheim, California)
2006	Pacific	78–70	Long Beach State	Johnny Gray, Pacific	Anaheim Convention Center (Anaheim, California)
2007	Long Beach State	94–83	Cal Poly	Aaron Nixon, Long Beach State	Anaheim Convention Center (Anaheim, California)
2008	Cal State Fullerton	81–66	UC Irvine	Josh Akognon, Cal State Fullerton	Anaheim Convention Center (Anaheim, California)
2009	Cal State Northridge	71–66 (OT)	Pacific	Rodrigue Mels, Cal State Northridge	Anaheim Convention Center (Anaheim, California)
2010	UC Santa Barbara	69–64	Long Beach State	Orlando Johnson, UC Santa Barbara	Anaheim Convention Center (Anaheim, California)
2011	UC Santa Barbara	64–56	Long Beach State	Orlando Johnson, UC Santa Barbara	Honda Center (Anaheim, California)
2012	Long Beach State	77–64	UC Santa Barbara	Casper Ware, Long Beach State	Honda Center (Anaheim, California)
2013	Pacific	64–55	UC Irvine	Tony Gill, Pacific	Honda Center (Anaheim, California)
2014	Cal Poly	61–59	Cal State Northridge	Chris Eversley, Cal Poly	Honda Center (Anaheim, California)
2015	UC Irvine	67–58	Hawaii	Will Davis II, UC Irvine	Honda Center (Anaheim, California)
2016	Hawai'i	64–60	Long Beach State	Aaron Valdes, Hawaii	Honda Center (Anaheim, California)
2017	UC Davis	50–47	UC Irvine	Chima Moneke, UC Davis	Honda Center (Anaheim, California)
2018	Cal State Fullerton	71–55	UC Irvine	Kyle Allman, Cal State Fullerton	Honda Center (Anaheim, California)
2019	UC Irvine	92–64	Cal State Fullerton	Max Hazzard, UC Irvine	Honda Center (Anaheim, California)
2020	Not held due to the COVID-19 pandemic				
2021	UC Santa Barbara	79–63	UC Irvine	JaQuori McLaughlin, UC Santa Barbara	Michelob Ultra Arena (Las Vegas, Nevada)
2022	Cal State Fullerton	72–71	Long Beach State	E. J. Anosike, Cal State Fullerton	Dollar Loan Center (Henderson, Nevada)
2023	UC Santa Barbara	72–62	Cal State Fullerton	Ajay Mitchell, UC Santa Barbara	Dollar Loan Center (Henderson, Nevada)
2024	Long Beach State	74–70	UC Davis	Aboubacar Traore, Long Beach State	Dollar Loan Center (Henderson, Nevada)
2025	UC San Diego	75–61	UC Irvine	Aniwaniwa Tait-Jones, UC San Diego	Lee's Family Forum (Henderson, Nevada)
2026	Hawai'i	71–64	UC Irvine	Isaac Johnson, Hawaii	Lee's Family Forum (Henderson, Nevada)

== Performance by school ==
School	Championships	Championship Years
UNLV	7	1983, 1985, 1986, 1987, 1989, 1990, 1991
Long Beach State	6	1977, 1993, 1995, 2007, 2012, 2024
Utah State	6	1988, 1998, 2000, 2001, 2003, 2005
Pacific	5	1979, 1997, 2004, 2006, 2013
UC Santa Barbara	5	2002, 2010, 2011, 2021, 2023
Cal State Fullerton	4	1978, 2008, 2018, 2022
Fresno State	3	1981, 1982, 1984
New Mexico State	3	1992, 1994, 1999
Hawai'i	2	2016, 2026
San Jose State	2	1980, 1996
UC Irvine	2	2015, 2019
Cal Poly	1	2014
Cal State Northridge	1	2009
San Diego State	1	1976
UC Davis	1	2017
UC San Diego	1	2025
Cal Baptist		
Cal State Bakersfield		
Sacramento State		
UC Riverside		
Utah Valley		

- Italics: No longer a conference member, as of the 2026–27 season.

== Broadcasters ==
=== Television ===
Year	Network	Play-by-play	Analyst
2026	ESPN2	Roxy Bernstein	Corey Williams
2025	ESPN2	Mike Monaco	Chris Spatola
2024	ESPN2	Roxy Bernstein	Corey Williams
2023	ESPN2	Roxy Bernstein	Corey Williams
2022	ESPN2	Roxy Bernstein	Corey Williams
2021	ESPN2	Dave Feldman	Corey Williams
2020	ESPN2	Roxy Bernstein	Adrian Branch
2019	ESPN2	Roxy Bernstein	Corey Williams
2018	ESPN2	Dave Pasch	Caron Butler
2017	ESPN2	Sam Farber	Mark Plansky
2016	ESPN2	Dave Pasch	Paul Biancardi
2015	ESPN2	Mark Jones	Jon Crispin
2014	ESPN2	Mark Jones	Miles Simon
2013	ESPN2	Mark Jones	Miles Simon
2012	ESPN2	Mark Jones	Miles Simon
2011	ESPN2	Todd Harris	Miles Simon
2010	ESPN2	Dave Flemming	Bob Valvano
2009	ESPN2	Eric Collins	Miles Simon
2008	ESPN2	Eric Collins	Dave Kaplan
2007	ESPN2	Dave Pasch	Bob Valvano
1989	ESPN	Jim Kelly	Mike Rice
1983	CBS	Frank Herzog	James Brown

=== Radio ===
Year	Network	Play-by-play	Analyst
2013	Dial Global Sports	Gary Cohen	Kyle Macy
2012	Dial Global Sports	John Sadak	Michael Cage

== See also ==
- Big West Conference women's basketball tournament
- CCAA men's basketball tournament
