= UC Santa Barbara Gauchos men's basketball statistical leaders =

The UC Santa Barbara Gauchos men's basketball statistical leaders are individual statistical leaders of the UC Santa Barbara Gauchos men's basketball program in various categories, including points, three-pointers, assists, blocks, rebounds, and steals. Within those areas, the lists identify single-game, single-season, and career leaders. The Gauchos represent the University of California Santa Barbara (UCSB) in the NCAA Division I Big West Conference through the 2026–27 season, after which UCSB will join the West Coast Conference.

UC Santa Barbara began competing in intercollegiate basketball in 1921. However, the school's record book does not generally list records from before the 1950s, as records from before this period are often incomplete and inconsistent. Since scoring was much lower in this era, and teams played much fewer games during a typical season, it is likely that few or no players from this era would appear on these lists anyway.

The NCAA did not officially record assists as a stat until the 1983–84 season, and blocks and steals until the 1985–86 season, but UC Santa Barbara's record books includes players in these stats before these seasons. These lists are updated through the end of the 2020–21 season.

== Scoring ==
Career
Rk	Player	Points	Seasons
1	Orlando Johnson	1825	2009–10 2010–11 2011–12
2	Alan Williams	1732	2011–12 2012–13 2013–14 2014–15
3	Alex Harris	1696	2004–05 2005–06 2006–07 2007–08
4	Carrick DeHart	1687	1986–87 1987–88 1988–89 1989–90
5	James Nunnally	1685	2008–09 2009–10 2010–11 2011–12
6	Michael Bryson	1620	2012–13 2013–14 2014–15 2015–16
	Amadou Sow	1620	2018–19 2019–20 2020–21 2021–22
8	Chris Devine	1607	2005–06 2006–07 2007–08 2008–09
9	Mark Hull	1580	1999–00 2000–01 2001–02 2002–03
10	Ajay Mitchell	1463	2021–22 2022–23 2023–24

Season
Rk	Player	Points	Season
1	Orlando Johnson	674	2010–11
2	Raymond Tutt	649	1996–97
3	Lucius Davis	644	1991–92
4	Alex Harris	627	2007–08
5	Max Heidegger	612	2017–18
6	Orlando Johnson	611	2011–12
	Alex Harris	611	2006–07
8	Alan Williams	596	2013–14
9	Ajay Mitchell	580	2023–24
10	Michael Bryson	577	2015–16

Single game
Rk	Player	Points	Season	Opponent
1	Ajay Mitchell	39	2023–24	UC Riverside
	Alan Williams	39	2013–14	South Dakota State
	Orlando Johnson	39	2010–11	UC Davis
	Scott Fisher	39	1985–86	Montana State
5	Ajay Mitchell	37	2023–24	Long Beach State
	Raymond Tutt	37	1996–97	UC Irvine
	Raymond Tutt	37	1996–97	St. Mary's
	York Gross	37	1982–83	Long Beach State
	Don Ford	37	1974–75	Portland
10	Michael Bryson	36	2015–16	Seattle
	Raymond Tutt	36	1996–97	Cal State Fullerton
	York Gross	36	1980–81	Portland State
	Tom Lee	36	1964–65	Central Missouri State
	Orlando Johnson	36	2011–12	UNLV
	Ajay Mitchell	36	2023–24	Cal State Northridge

== Rebounds ==
Career
Rk	Player	Rebounds	Seasons
1	Alan Williams	1125	2011–12 2012–13 2013–14 2014–15
2	Eric McArthur	904	1986–87 1987–88 1988–89 1989–90
3	Amadou Sow	860	2018–19 2019–20 2020–21 2021–22
4	Doug Rex	829	1968–69 1969–70 1970–71
5	Tex Walker	800	1973–74 1974–75 1975–76 1976–77
6	Richard Anderson	769	1978–79 1979–80 1980–81 1981–82
7	Chris Devine	723	2005–06 2006–07 2007–08 2008–09
8	Scott Fisher	664	1982–83 1983–84 1984–85 1985–86
9	Gary Gray	662	1987–88 1988–89 1989–90 1990–91
10	John Tschogl	646	1969–70 1970–71 1971–72

Season
Rk	Player	Rebounds	Season
1	Eric McArthur	377	1989–90
2	Dick Acres	358	1955–56
3	Leland King II	327	2017–18
4	Alan Williams	322	2013–14
5	Alan Williams	308	2014–15
6	Eric McArthur	304	1988–89
7	John Conroy	302	1963–64
8	Alan Williams	300	2012–13
9	Doug Rex	292	1968–69
10	Richard Anderson	289	1981–82

Single game
Rk	Player	Rebounds	Season	Opponent
1	Eric McArthur	28	1989–90	New Mexico State
2	Dick Acres	25	1957–58	Cal State Los Angeles
3	Doug Rex	22	1968–69	Cal State Northridge
	Dick Kolberg	22	1966–67	Pacific
	Gary Davis	22	1960–61	Arizona
6	Eric McArthur	21	1989–90	Cal State Fullerton
	Doug Rex	21	1969–70	Cal State Los Angeles
	Doug Rex	21	1969–70	Stanford
9	Alan Williams	20	2014–15	Mercer
	Alan Williams	20	2013–14	UC Davis
	Eric McArthur	20	1989–90	Fresno State
	Eric McArthur	20	1989–90	Loyola Marymount
	Brian Shaw	20	1987–88	North Carolina State
	Richard Anderson	20	1980–81	Grambling
	Dick Kolberg	20	1966–67	Cal State Northridge

== Assists ==
Career
Rk	Player	Assists	Seasons
1	Ray Kelly	515	1990–91 1991–92 1992–93
2	Carlton Davenport	444	1985–86 1986–87 1987–88 1988–89
3	Eric Childress	407	2013–14 2014–15 2015–16 2016–17
4	Phillip Turner	403	1992–93 1993–94 1994–95 1995–96
5	Ajay Mitchell	395	2021–22 2022–23 2023–24
6	Conner Henry	394	1982–83 1983–84 1984–85 1985–86
7	Jacoby Atako	382	2000–01 2001–02 2002–03 2003–04
8	Bob Schachter	377	1970–71 1971–72 1972–73
9	Brian Shaw	375	1986–87 1987–88
10	JaQuori McLaughlin	363	2018–19 2019–20 2020–21

Season
Rk	Player	Assists	Season
1	Ray Kelly	205	1992–93
2	Brian Shaw	193	1986–87
3	Phillip Turner	190	1995–96
4	Carlton Davenport	182	1988–89
	Brian Shaw	182	1987–88
6	Ray Kelly	179	1991–92
	Ajay Mitchell	179	2022–23
8	Zalmico Harmon	153	2013–14
9	Stephan Swenson	144	2024–25
10	Eric Childress	142	2015–16

Single game
Rk	Player	Assists	Season	Opponent
1	Ray Kelly	16	1992–93	UC Irvine
2	Ray Kelly	15	1992–93	UNLV
3	Ray Kelly	13	1991–92	Arizona State
	Brian Shaw	13	1987–88	Pacific
	Aaron McCarthy	13	1980–81	Long Beach State
6	Justin Joyner	12	2010–11	Cal State Fullerton
	Phillip Turner	12	1995–96	Pacific
	Phillip Turner	12	1995–96	UNLV
	Phillip Turner	12	1995–96	San Jose State
	Ray Kelly	12	1992–93	Pacific
	Ray Kelly	12	1991–92	Cal State Fullerton
	Ray Kelly	12	1990–91	UC Irvine
	Carlton Davenport	12	1988–89	Pacific
	Carlton Davenport	12	1988–89	Loyola Marymount
	Carlton Davenport	12	1986–87	San Francisco State

== Steals ==
Career
Rk	Player	Steals	Seasons
1	Ray Kelly	172	1990–91 1991–92 1992–93
2	Eric Childress	153	2013–14 2014–15 2015–16 2016–17
3	Josh Pierre-Louis	148	2020–21 2021–22 2022–23 2023–24
4	Justin Joyner	134	2006–07 2007–08 2009–10 2010–11
5	Carrick DeHart	133	1986–87 1987–88 1988–89 1989–90
6	Chris Devine	130	2005–06 2006–07 2007–08 2008–09
7	Jacoby Atako	129	2000–01 2001–02 2002–03 2003–04
8	Gabe Vincent	116	2014–15 2015–16 2016–17 2017–18
	Carlton Davenport	116	1985–86 1986–87 1987–88 1988–89
	Eric McArthur	116	1986–87 1987–88 1988–89 1989–90

Season
Rk	Player	Steals	Season
1	Ray Kelly	72	1991–92
2	Derrick Allen	68	1998–99
3	Mario Gaines	65	1981–82
4	Ray Kelly	62	1992–93
5	Eric Childress	61	2016–17
6	Stephan Swenson	59	2024–25
7	Chrismen Oliver	55	2004–05
8	Justin Joyner	51	2010–11
	Eric McArthur	51	1989–90
10	Brian Shaw	49	1987–88

Single game
Rk	Player	Steals	Season	Opponent
1	Derrick Allen	8	1998–99	UC Irvine
	Mario Gaines	8	1981–82	San Diego
3	Derrick Allen	7	1998–99	Long Beach State
	Ray Kelly	7	1992–93	Long Beach State
5	Eric Childress	6	2016–17	Hawai'i
	Eric Childress	6	2015–16	Hawai'i
	D.J. Posley	6	2007–08	UC Irvine
	Jacoby Atako	6	2001–02	Cal State Fullerton
	Raymond Tutt	6	1996–97	North Texas
	Ray Kelly	6	1992–93	UC Irvine
	Ray Kelly	6	1991–92	Arizona State
	Ray Kelly	6	1991–92	Cal State Fullerton
	Carlton Davenport	6	1987–88	Utah State
	Brian Shaw	6	1986–87	UC Irvine

== Blocks ==
Career
Rk	Player	Blocks	Seasons
1	Eric McArthur	249	1986–87 1987–88 1988–89 1989–90
2	Alan Williams	219	2011–12 2012–13 2013–14 2014–15
3	Greg Somogyi	189	2008–09 2009–10 2010–11 2011–12
4	Doug Muse	154	1991–92 1992–93 1993–94 1994–95
5	Adama Ndiaye	117	1998–99 1999–2000 2001–02
6	Glenn Turner	107	2003–04 2004–05 2005–06 2006–07
7	Amadou Sow	97	2018–19 2019–20 2020–21 2021–22
8	Kealon Wallace	82	1994–95 1995–96 1996–97 1997–98
	Jaime Serna	82	2008–09 2009–10 2010–11 2011–12
10	Robinson Idehen	79	2018–19 2019–20 2020–21 2021–22

Season
Rk	Player	Blocks	Season
1	Eric McArthur	91	1989–90
2	Eric McArthur	78	1988–89
3	Alan Williams	67	2013–14
4	Alan Williams	64	2012–13
	Eric McArthur	64	1987–88
6	Greg Somogyi	61	2010–11
7	Doug Muse	55	1994–95
8	Greg Somogyi	53	2011–12
9	Jalen Canty	48	2017–18
	Adama Ndiaye	48	1998–99

Single game
Rk	Player	Blocks	Season	Opponent
1	Alan Williams	8	2013–14	South Dakota State
	Greg Somogyi	8	2009–10	Fresno State
3	Alan Williams	7	2014–15	San Diego
4	Jalen Canty	6	2017–18	Cal Poly
	Alan Williams	6	2014–15	Mercer
	Greg Somogyi	6	2010–11	Cal Poly
	Cameron Goettsche	6	2005–06	UC Riverside
	Glenn Turner	6	2004–05	Idaho
	Eric McArthur	6	1988–89	Pepperdine
	Richard Anderson	6	1980–81	San Jose State
	Robbie Robinson	6	1979–80	Missouri Western
	Robbie Robinson	6	1978–79	Fresno State
	Greg Somogyi	6	2011–12	San Diego State
