= 2010–11 Cal State Fullerton Titans men's basketball team =

American college basketball season

2010–11 Cal State Fullerton Titans men's basketball
- Conference: Big West Conference
- Record: 11–20 (7–9 Big West)
- Head coach: Bob Burton (8th season)
- Assistant coaches: Andy Newman; Julius Hicks; Scott Waterman
- Home arena: Titan Gym

2010–11 Big West men's basketball standings
| | Conf. | | | | Overall |
| Team | W | | L | PCT | W | | L | PCT |
|---|---|---|---|---|---|---|---|---|
| Long Beach State | 14 | – | 2 | .875 | 22 | – | 12 | .647 |
| Cal Poly | 10 | – | 6 | .625 | 15 | – | 15 | .500 |
| Cal State Northridge | 9 | – | 7 | .563 | 14 | – | 18 | .438 |
| UC Santa Barbara† | 8 | – | 8 | .500 | 18 | – | 14 | .563 |
| Pacific | 8 | – | 8 | .500 | 16 | – | 15 | .516 |
| Cal State Fullerton | 7 | – | 9 | .438 | 11 | – | 20 | .355 |
| UC Irvine | 6 | – | 10 | .375 | 13 | – | 19 | .406 |
| UC Riverside | 6 | – | 10 | .375 | 12 | – | 19 | .387 |
| UC Davis | 4 | – | 12 | .250 | 10 | – | 20 | .333 |
† 2011 Big West tournament winner As of March 15, 2012; Rankings from AP Poll

The 2010–11 Cal State Fullerton Titans men's basketball team represented California State University, Fullerton during the 2010–11 NCAA Division I men's basketball season. The Titans, led by eighth-year head coach Bob Burton, played their home games at Titan Gym and were members of the Big West Conference. They finished the season 11–20, 7–9 in Big West play to finish in sixth.

== Previous season ==
Cal State Fullerton finished the 2009–10 season at 16–15, going 8–8 in conference play to finish third. The Titans beat Cal State Northridge in the first round of the 2010 Big West Conference men's basketball tournament before falling to UC Davis in the second round.

== Roster ==
2010–11 Cal State Fullerton Titans men's basketball team
Players
Coaches

| Pos. | # | Name | Height | Weight | Year | Previous school | Hometown |
|---|---|---|---|---|---|---|---|
| F | 0 | Andre Hardy | 6 ft 6 in (1.98 m) | 230 lb (104 kg) | Jr | Oral Roberts | San Diego, California |
| G | 3 | Devon Peltier | 5 ft 11 in (1.8 m) | 185 lb (84 kg) | Sr | Missouri State–West Plains | West Plains, Missouri |
| G | 11 | Roger Guardia | 6 ft 4 in (1.93 m) | 185 lb (84 kg) | Sr | Cuesta College | Barcelona, Spain |
| F | 12 | Jer'Vaughn Johnson | 6 ft 6 in (1.98 m) | 240 lb (109 kg) | RS Sr | San Diego State | Compton, California |
| G | 13 | Isiah Umipig | 6 ft 1 in (1.85 m) | 180 lb (82 kg) | Fr | Federal Way High School | Federal Way, Washington |
| G | 14 | Orlando Brown | 6 ft 1 in (1.85 m) | 175 lb (79 kg) | Jr | Connors State College | Stringtown, Oklahoma |
| F | 15 | Orane Chin | 6 ft 7 in (2.01 m) | 195 lb (88 kg) | Jr | South Florida | Miramar, Florida |
| F | 21 | Omondi Amoke | 6 ft 7 in (2.01 m) | 225 lb (102 kg) | RS Jr | California | Oxnard, California |
| G | 22 | James Conway | 5 ft 6 in (1.68 m) | 150 lb (68 kg) | Fr | Martin Luther King High School | Riverside, California |
| G | 23 | Alex Harris | 6 ft 1 in (1.85 m) | 170 lb (77 kg) | So | Diablo Valley College | Richmond, California |
| C | 24 | Bernard Webb | 6 ft 9 in (2.06 m) | 255 lb (116 kg) | Jr | Monroe College | Bridgeport, Connecticut |
| F | 32 | Steve Jurich | 6 ft 7 in (2.01 m) | 200 lb (91 kg) | Jr | Saddleback College | Rancho Santa Margarita, California |
| G | 33 | D.J. Seeley | 6 ft 4 in (1.93 m) | 195 lb (88 kg) | Jr | California | Stockton, California |
| G | 44 | Kwame Vaughn | 6 ft 3 in (1.91 m) | 195 lb (88 kg) | Jr | San Francisco State | Oakland, California |
| C | 55 | Eric Williams | 6 ft 9 in (2.06 m) | 280 lb (127 kg) | Jr | Pasadena Community College | Los Angeles, California |

Head coach

- Bob Burton (Fresno State)

Assistant coach(es)

Legend

- (C) Team captain
- (S) Suspended
- (I) Ineligible
- (W) Walk-on
- Injured
- Current redshirt

Roster
Last update: March 17, 2025

== Schedule ==
| Date time, TV | Rank^{#} | Opponent^{#} | Result | Record | Site (attendance) city, state |
Exhibition
| November 6, 2010*; 7:00 p.m. | | Cal State Los Angeles | W 79–67 | | Titan Gym; Fullerton, CA |
Regular season
| November 12, 2010* | | vs. Central Michigan; Rainbow Classic | L 67–70 | 0–1 | Stan Sheriff Center; Honolulu, HI |
| November 13, 2010*; 10:00 p.m. | | at Hawaii; Rainbow Classic | L 70–84 | 0–2 | Stan Sheriff Center (6,239); Honolulu, HI |
| November 15, 2010* | | vs. Montana State | L 76–80 | 0–3 | Titan Gym; Fullerton, CA |
| November 21, 2010* | | at San Diego | W 62–59 | 1–3 | Jenny Craig Pavilion; San Diego, CA |
| November 24, 2010*; 7:30 p.m. | | at USC | L 54–81 | 1–4 | Galen Center (3,821); Los Angeles, CA |
| November 27, 2010* | | Cal State Bakersfield | W 85–75 | 2–4 | Titan Gym; Fullerton, CA |
| November 30, 2010*; 6:00 p.m. | | at Montana | L 67–75 | 2–5 | Dahlberg Arena (2,912); Missoula, MT |
| December 4, 2010* | | San Diego | W 90–76 | 3–5 | Titan Gym; Fullerton, CA |
| December 8, 2010*; 5:30 p.m., KWBA/FCS | | at Arizona | L 62–73 | 3–6 | McKale Center (12,199); Tucson, AZ |
| December 12, 2010* | | at Portland State | L 89–93 | 3–7 | Peter W. Stott Center; Portland, OR |
| December 18, 2010* | | Occidental | W 76–48 | 4–7 | Titan Gym; Fullerton, CA |
| December 22, 2010*; 7:00 p.m. | | Montana | L 57–71 | 4–8 | Titan Gym (722); Fullerton, CA |
| December 28, 2010 | | UC Davis | L 72–88 | 4–9 (0–1) | Titan Gym; Fullerton, CA |
| December 30, 2010 | | Pacific | W 54–51 | 5–9 (1–1) | Titan Gym; Fullerton, CA |
| January 5, 2011 | | at UC Irvine | L 78–85 | 5–10 (1–2) | Bren Events Center (1,881); Irvine, CA |
| January 8, 2011 | | at UC Riverside | W 83–77 ^{OT} | 6–10 (2–2) | UC Riverside Student Recreation Center; Riverside, CA |
| January 13, 2011 | | at Cal Poly | L 54–58 | 6–11 (2–3) | Mott Gymn; San Luis Obispo, CA |
| January 15, 2011 | | at Cal State Northridge | L 65–89 | 6–12 (2–4) | The Matadome; Northridge, CA |
| January 19, 2011; 7:05 p.m. | | Long Beach State | W 89–87 | 7–12 (3–4) | Titan Gym; Fullerton, CA |
| January 22, 2011 | | UC Santa Barbara | W 63–58 | 8–12 (4–4) | Titan Gym; Fullerton, CA |
| January 25, 2011* | | at Cal State Bakersfield | L 75–77 | 8–13 | Rabobank Arena; Bakersfield, CA |
| January 29, 2011; 7:30 p.m. | | at Long Beach State | L 60–75 | 8–14 (4–5) | Walter Pyramid; Long Beach, CA |
| February 3, 2011 | | UC Irvine | W 80–74 | 9–14 (5–5) | Titan Gym (946); Fullerton, CA |
| February 5, 2011 | | UC Riverside | L 69–70 | 9–15 (5–6) | Titan Gym; Fullerton, CA |
| February 10, 2011 | | Cal State Northridge | L 68–70 | 9–16 (5–7) | Titan Gym; Fullerton, CA |
| February 16, 2011 | | at UC Santa Barbara | L 71–86 | 9–17 (5–8) | The Thunderdome; Santa Barbara, CA |
| February 19, 2011* | | at Idaho State | L 79–84 | 9–18 | Holt Arena; Pocatello, ID |
| February 26, 2011 | | Cal Poly | L 70–75 | 9–19 (5–9) | Titan Gym; Fullerton, CA |
| March 3, 2011 | | at Pacific | W 82–80 | 10–19 (6–9) | Alex G. Spanos Center; Stockton, CA |
| March 5, 2011 | | at UC Davis | W 87–82 | 11–19 (7–9) | The Pavilion; Davis, CA |
Big West tournament
| March 10, 2011 | (6) | (3) Cal State Northridge; Quarterfinals | L 54–75 | 11–20 | Honda Center; Anaheim, CA |
*Non-conference game. ^{#}Rankings from AP Poll. (#) Tournament seedings in parentheses. All times are in Pacific Time.
