= Justin Joyner =

American basketball coach (born 1988)

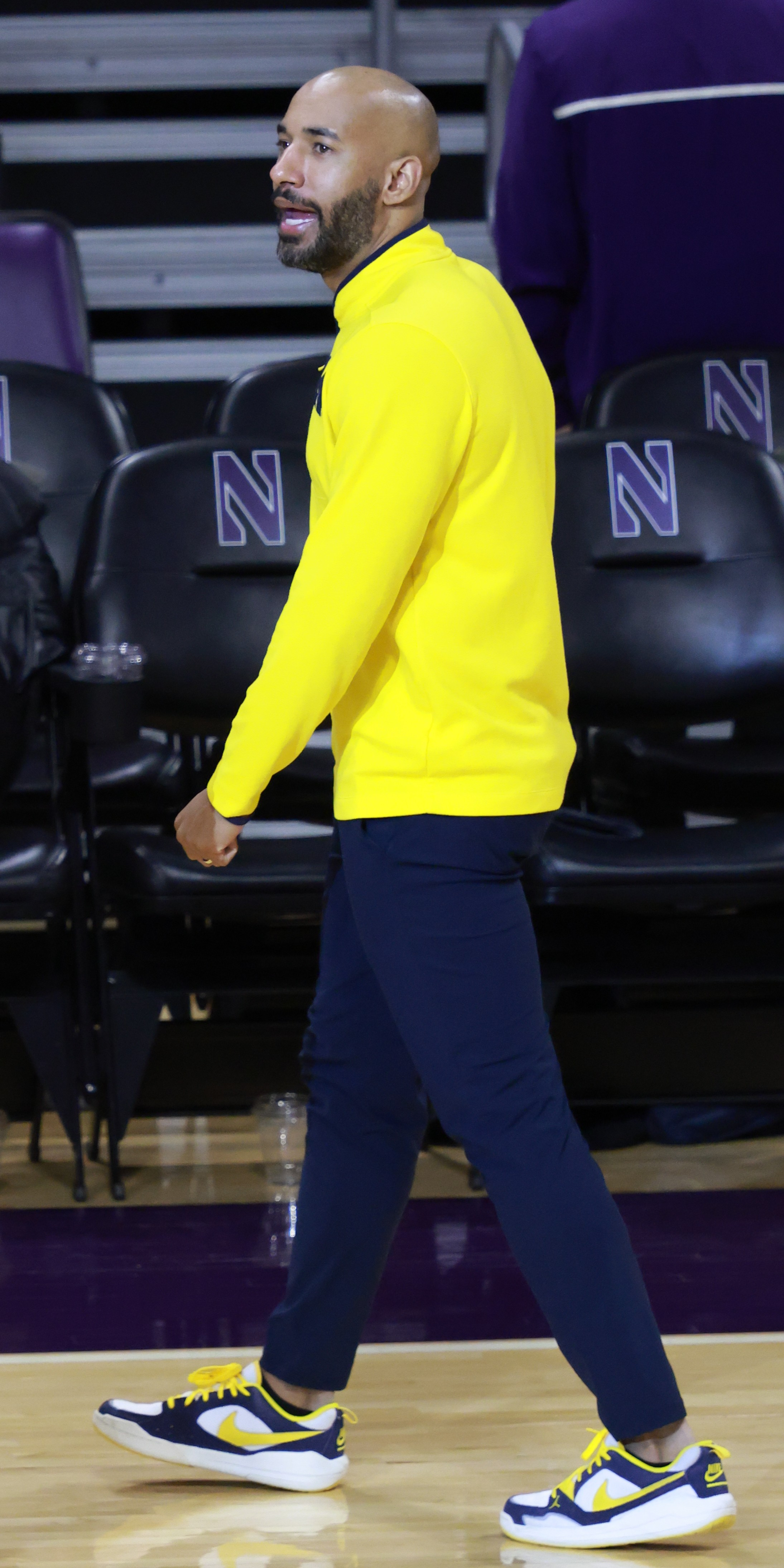
- Joyner with the 2025–26 Michigan Wolverines

Current position
- Title: Head coach
- Team: Oregon State
- Conference: Pac-12
- Record: 0–0 (–)

Biographical details
- Born: February 25, 1988 (age 38); Antioch, California, U.S.

Playing career
- 2006–2011: UC Santa Barbara

Coaching career (HC unless noted)
- 2018–2022: Saint Mary's (assistant)
- 2022–2024: Saint Mary's (associate HC)
- 2024–2026: Michigan (assistant)
- 2026–present: Oregon State

Administrative career (AD unless noted)
- 2017–2018: Saint Mary's (DBO)

Head coaching record
- Overall: 4–0 (1.000)

Accomplishments and honors

Championships
- As assistant: NCAA Division I tournament (2026)

Awards
- As player: Big West All-Freshman team (2007)

Justin Joyner (born February 25, 1988) is an American college basketball coach. He is currently the head coach for the Oregon State Beavers. He previously held assistant roles at the University of Michigan and Saint Mary's College of California. As a player and an assistant coach, Joyner has won championships at every stop of his career; including the 2026 national championship with Michigan.

== Playing career ==
Joyner attended De La Salle High School in Concord, California, where he was the starting point guard for the 32–1 California State Division I champions in 2006. In the championship game, after his teammates missed all three prior free throw attempts in the final minute, he made a pair with 7.7 seconds left in a 43-40 victory over Clovis West High School.

Joyner played college basketball for the UC Santa Barbara Gauchos from 2006 through 2011, where he appeared in 112 games with 74 starts, averaging 3.4 points, 2.1 rebounds, 3.2 assists, and 1.2 steals per game. He was also a three-time team captain and a 2007 all-freshman selection by the Big West Conference. The 2007–08 Gauchos team was 2007–08 Big West co-champion (with Cal State Fullerton and Cal State Northridge). Joyner threw the 3/4 court pass in overtime with 0.3 seconds left to set up the tiebreaking points for the championship. With Joyner as its starting point guard, the team set a school record with 23 wins. He had played the entire 2007–08 season with a broken bone in his right wrist and the surgery did not heal in time for him to play during the 2008–09 season. The 2009–10 Gauchos were also the Big West regular season co-champion (with Pacific). The Gauchos won the 2010 and 2011 Big West Conference men's basketball tournaments.

== Coaching career ==
After graduating from UC Santa Barbara, Joyner earned $800/month ($1145 in 2025) in a San Francisco Bay Area AAU program coaching youth basketball.

=== Saint Mary's ===
Joyner got his first career coaching job in 2017 as the Director of Basketball Operations for the Saint Mary's Gaels of the West Coast Conference (WCC). After one season, he was promoted to assistant coach. Before the start of the 2022 season, Joyner was once again promoted to be the team's associate head coach. The 2018–19 Gaels won the 2019 WCC tournament, with Joyner as an assistant coach. In Joyner's final two seasons with Saint Mary's as an associate coach, the 2022–23 and 2023–24 Gaels won the 2022–23 and 2023–24 WCC regular season championships, respectively. The also won the 2024 WCC tournament during this span.

=== Michigan ===
In April 2024, he was hired by Dusty May at the University of Michigan as an assistant coach for the Wolverines. The 2024–25 Wolverines won the Big Ten tournament. The 2025–26 Wolverines won the Big Ten Conference regular season. On April 6, Michigan earned the championhsip at the 2026 NCAA Division I men's basketball tournament and tied the Big Ten Conference record for single-season wins.

=== Oregon State ===
On March 11, 2026, Joyner was hired to be the head coach at Oregon State University for the Beavers. Oregon State were returning to the newly revamped Pac-12 Conference for the 2026-27 season where the Gonzaga Bulldogs were expected to be the dominant program. Joyner had enjoyed prior coaching successes against Gonzaga. On March 16, he held a press conference in Corvallis, Oregon, to meet the local press as after agreeing to a five-year contract worth $4.85 million.

Joyner remained with Michigan through the 2026 NCAA tournament, although there was an urgency at Oregon State to "retain players, to build a staff, and to prepare for the transfer portal". He formally began as head coach on the day after Michigan's tournament ended. However, the job informally began well before Michigan's season ended. On March 25, his coaching staff's first two assistant coach additions were announced: Danny Yoshikawa and Michael Plank. Dominic Lippi and Justin Argenal also joined as assistant coaches in early April.

The 2026–27 Beavers team was the first team to start with a 5–0 record since the 1986–87 team and Joyner became the first Beavers coach to start 5–0 since Howard Ray did so for the 1916–17 Beavers. By defeating the Oregon Ducks in a rivalry game on November 19, 2026, the team got off to the best start (6–0) since the 1980–81 Beavers (who started 26–0).

== Personal life ==
Joyner's wife, Tracy, is the head soccer coach at the University of Oregon. They have a daughter, Weslee. Before being hired by Oregon in December 2024, Tracy had spent five years as head coach for the UC Davis Aggies. They had lived together in the Bay area near Saint Mary's until their 2024 coaching changes.

== See also ==
- UC Santa Barbara Gauchos men's basketball statistical leaders
