= 2009–10 Cal State Fullerton Titans men's basketball team =

American college basketball season

2009–10 Cal State Fullerton Titans men's basketball
- Conference: Big West Conference
- Record: 16–15 (8–8 Big West)
- Head coach: Bob Burton (7th season)
- Assistant coaches: Andy Newman; Julius Hicks; Scott Waterman
- Home arena: Titan Gym

2009–10 Big West men's basketball standings
	Conf.				Overall
Team	W		L	PCT	W		L	PCT
UC Santa Barbara †	12	–	4	.750	20	–	10	.667
Pacific	12	–	4	.750	23	–	12	.657
Cal State Fullerton	8	–	8	.500	16	–	15	.516
Long Beach State	8	–	8	.500	17	–	16	.515
UC Davis	8	–	8	.500	14	–	18	.438
Cal Poly	7	–	9	.438	12	–	19	.387
UC Irvine	6	–	10	.375	14	–	18	.438
Cal State Northridge	6	–	10	.375	11	–	21	.344
UC Riverside	5	–	11	.313	12	–	17	.414
† 2010 Big West tournament winner As of March 30, 2010; Rankings from AP Poll

The 2009–10 Cal State Fullerton Titans men's basketball team represented California State University, Fullerton during the 2009–10 NCAA Division I men's basketball season. The Titans, led by seventh-year head coach Bob Burton, played their home games at Titan Gym and were members of the Big West Conference. They finished the season 16–15, 8–8 in Big West play to finish in fifth.

== Previous season ==
Cal State Fullerton finished the 2008–09 season at 15–17, including a 7–9 record in Big West play to finish 7th in the conference. They lost to the UC Santa Barbara Gauchos in the conference tournament to end their season.

== Roster ==
2009–10 Cal State Fullerton Titans men's basketball team
Players
Coaches

Pos.	#	Name	Height	Weight	Year	Previous school	Hometown
G	0	Aaron Thompson	6 ft 4 in (1.93 m)	190 lb (86 kg)	Sr	Cerritos College	Los Angeles, California
G	3	Devon Peltier	5 ft 11 in (1.8 m)	185 lb (84 kg)	Jr	Missouri State–West Plains	St. Thomas, Virgin Islands
F	5	Gerard Anderson	6 ft 6 in (1.98 m)	205 lb (93 kg)	Sr	Saddleback College	Los Angeles, California
G	11	Jacques Streeter	6 ft 0 in (1.83 m)	175 lb (79 kg)	So	Findlay Prep	Los Angeles, California
F	12	Jer’Vaughn Johnson	6 ft 6 in (1.98 m)	240 lb (109 kg)	Jr	San Diego State	Compton, California
C	13	Bryce Webster	6 ft 10 in (2.08 m)	240 lb (109 kg)	Jr	Irvine Valley College	Minneapolis, Minnesota
G	14	Jamel McGuire	6 ft 5 in (1.96 m)	165 lb (75 kg)	Jr	San Diego Community College	San Diego, California
F	15	Orane Chin	6 ft 7 in (2.01 m)	195 lb (88 kg)	So	South Florida	Miramar, Florida
G	21	Robbie Robinson	6 ft 5 in (1.96 m)	215 lb (98 kg)	Jr	Riverside Community College	Northridge, California
G	22	Frank Granados	5 ft 8 in (1.73 m)	170 lb (77 kg)	Sr	Santa Ana High School	Santa Ana, California
G	24	Eric Williams	6 ft 3 in (1.91 m)	185 lb (84 kg)	Jr	Orange Coast College	Ontario, California
F/C	33	Ray Miller	6 ft 8 in (2.03 m)	225 lb (102 kg)	Sr	Iowa Western College	Des Moines, Iowa
F/C	42	Papa Guisse	6 ft 8 in (2.03 m)	210 lb (95 kg)	Sr	Salt Lake City Community College	Louga, Senegal

Head coach

- Bob Burton (Fresno State)

Assistant coach(es)

Legend

- (C) Team captain
- (S) Suspended
- (I) Ineligible
- (W) Walk-on
- Injured
- Current redshirt

Roster
Last update: April 5, 2025

== Schedule ==
Date time, TV	Rank^{#}	Opponent^{#}	Result	Record	Site (attendance) city, state
Exhibition
November 9, 2009*		Cal State Los Angeles	W 69–58		Titan Gym; Fullerton, CA
Regular season
November 14, 2009*		Hope International	W 93–57	1–0	Titan Gym; Fullerton, CA
November 16, 2009*		UCLA	W 68–65 ^{2OT}	2–0	Pauley Pavilion; Los Angeles, CA
November 24, 2009*		New Mexico State	W 84–73	3–0	Titan Gym; Fullerton, CA
December 4, 2009*		Central Arkansas; Etech Lumberjack Classic	L 49–69	3–1	William R. Johnson Coliseum; Nacogdoches, TX
December 5, 2009*		Stephen F. Austin; Etech Lumberjack Classic	L 61–62	3–2	William R. Johnson Coliseum; Nacogdoches, TX
December 9, 2009*		San Diego State	L 68–82	3–3	Viejas Arena; San Diego, CA
December 12, 2009*		Occidental	W 97–59	4–3	Titan Gym; Fullerton, CA
December 21, 2009*		Weber State; Basketball Travelers' Invitational	L 71–82	4–4	Dee Glen Smith Spectrum; Logan, UT
December 22, 2009*		Utah State; Basketball Travelers' Invitational	L 60–83	4–5	Dee Glen Smith Spectrum; Logan, UT
December 23, 2009*		Morehead State; Basketball Travelers' Invitational	L 62–69	4–6	Dee Glen Smith Spectrum; Logan, UT
December 28, 2009*		Cal State Bakersfield	W 77–70	5–6	Titan Gym; Fullerton, CA
January 2, 2010		UC Davis	L 63–67	5–7	The Pavilion at ARC; Davis, CA
January 7, 2010		Long Beach State	W 85–75	6–7	Titan Gym; Fullerton, CA
January 9, 2010		UC Riverside	W 69–56	7–7	Student Recreation Center; Riverside, CA
January 14, 2010		Cal Poly	W 68–54	8–7	Titan Gym; Fullerton, CA
January 16, 2010		Cal State Northridge	L 72–78	8–8	Titan Gym; Fullerton, CA
January 21, 2010		Pacific	L 73–80	8–9	Alex G. Spanos Center; Stockton, CA
January 23, 2010		UC Santa Barbara	L 80–85 ^{OT}	8–10	The Thunderdome; Santa Barbara, CA
January 26, 2010*		Cal State Bakersfield	W 92–84 ^{OT}	9–10	Rabobank Arena; Bakersfield, CA
January 30, 2010		UC Irvine	W 74–68	10–10	Titan Gym; Fullerton, CA
February 4, 2010		Long Beach State	W 81–75 ^{OT}	11–10	The Walter Pyramid; Long Beach, CA
February 6, 2010		UC Riverside	L 59–76	11–11	Titan Gym; Fullerton, CA
February 10, 2010		UC Irvine	W 72–61	12–11	Bren Events Center; Irvine, CA
February 13, 2010		Cal State Northridge	W 113–112 ^{3OT}	13–11	The Matadome; Northridge, CA
February 17, 2010		UC Santa Barbara	L 65–73	13–12	Titan Gym; Fullerton, CA
February 20, 2010*		SIU Edwardsville	W 78–74	14–12	Titan Gym; Fullerton, CA
February 24, 2010		Cal Poly	W 70–68	15–12	Mott Gym; San Luis Obispo, CA
March 4, 2010		Pacific	L 64–70	15–13	Titan Gym; Fullerton, CA
March 6, 2010		UC Davis	L 86–92 ^{OT}	15–14	Titan Gym; Fullerton, CA
Big West tournament
March 10, 2010		Cal State Northridge	W 84–76	16–14	Honda Center; Anaheim, CA
March 11, 2010		UC Davis	L 65–68	16–15	Honda Center; Anaheim, CA
*Non-conference game. ^{#}Rankings from AP Poll. (#) Tournament seedings in parentheses. All times are in Pacific Time.
