= 2010–11 UC Irvine Anteaters men's basketball team =

American college basketball season

2010–11 UC Irvine Anteaters men's basketball
- Conference: Big West Conference
- Record: 13–19 (6–10 Big West)
- Head coach: Russell Turner (1st season)
- Assistant coaches: Ali Ton; Ryan Badrtalei; Nick Booker
- Home arena: Bren Events Center

2010–11 Big West men's basketball standings
	Conf.				Overall
Team	W		L	PCT	W		L	PCT
Long Beach State	14	–	2	.875	22	–	12	.647
Cal Poly	10	–	6	.625	15	–	15	.500
Cal State Northridge	9	–	7	.563	14	–	18	.438
UC Santa Barbara†	8	–	8	.500	18	–	14	.563
Pacific	8	–	8	.500	16	–	15	.516
Cal State Fullerton	7	–	9	.438	11	–	20	.355
UC Irvine	6	–	10	.375	13	–	19	.406
UC Riverside	6	–	10	.375	12	–	19	.387
UC Davis	4	–	12	.250	10	–	20	.333
† 2011 Big West tournament winner As of March 15, 2012; Rankings from AP Poll

The 2010–11 UC Irvine Anteaters men's basketball team represented the University of California, Irvine during the 2010–11 NCAA Division I men's basketball season. The Anteaters, led by first year head coach Russell Turner, played their home games at the Bren Events Center and were members of the Big West Conference. They finished the season 13–19, 6–10 in Big West play to finish tied for seventh place.

== Previous season ==
The 2009–10 UC Irvine Anteaters men's basketball team finished the season with a record of 14–18, and 6–10 in PCAA play. Following the big west tournament, it was announced that head coach Pat Douglass would not have his contract renewed. Golden State Warriors assistant coach Russell Turner was announced as the new head coach on April 9, 2010.

== Off-Season ==
=== 2010 Recruiting Class ===
College recruiting
Name	Hometown	School	Height	Weight	Commit date
Kevin Mulloy; PF	Oxnard, CA	Oxnard High School	6 ft 7 in (2.01 m)	215 lb (98 kg)	
Kevin Mulloy; PF	Recruit ratings: ESPN: (86)				
Chris McNealy; SG	Danville, CA	San Ramon Valley High School	6 ft 2 in (1.88 m)	170 lb (77 kg)	
Chris McNealy; SG	Recruit ratings: 247Sports: ESPN: (80)				
Ben Hayes; SG	Mission Viejo, CA	Mission Viejo High School	6 ft 5 in (1.96 m)	N/A	
Ben Hayes; SG	Recruit ratings: ESPN: (78)				
Overall recruit ranking: Scout: n/a Rivals: n/a ESPN: n/a
Note: In many cases, Scout, Rivals, 247Sports, On3, and ESPN may conflict in their listings of height and weight.; In these cases, the average was taken. ESPN grades are on a 100-point scale.; Sources: "ESPN - UC Irvine Basketball Recruiting 2010". ESPN.; "2010 Team Ranking". Rivals.

== Roster ==
2010–11 UC Irvine Anteaters men's basketball team
Players
Coaches

Pos.	#	Name	Height	Weight	Year	Hometown
C	33	Maxime Chupin	6 ft 9 in (2.06 m)	220 lb (100 kg)	Fr	Jallais (France)
G	0	Derick Flowers	6 ft 0 in (1.83 m)	170 lb (77 kg)	So	Los Angeles, CA
F	20	Adam Folker	6 ft 9 in (2.06 m)	225 lb (102 kg)	Jr	Markham, ON (Canada)
G	25	Emil Kim	6 ft 5 in (1.96 m)	205 lb (93 kg)	Sr	Santa Ana, CA
G	22	Jonas Lalenzadeh	6 ft 5 in (1.96 m)	205 lb (93 kg)	Jr	Irvine, CA
F	32	Pavol Losonsky	6 ft 9 in (2.06 m)	235 lb (107 kg)	Sr	Pezinok (Slovakia)
G	5	Chris McNealy	6 ft 3 in (1.91 m)	170 lb (77 kg)	Fr	Daville, CA
G	1	Darren Moore	6 ft 3 in (1.91 m)	190 lb (86 kg)	Sr	Chino Hills, CA
F	35	Kevin Mulloy	6 ft 6 in (1.98 m)	205 lb (93 kg)	Fr	Oxnard, CA
G	10	Patrick Rembert	6 ft 0 in (1.83 m)	188 lb (85 kg)	Sr	Long Beach, CA
G	11	Brandon Scott	6 ft 2 in (1.88 m)	190 lb (86 kg)	So	Los Altos Hills, CA
C	42	Peter Simek	6 ft 9 in (2.06 m)	240 lb (109 kg)	Sr	Bratislava(Slovakia)
G	21	Daman Starring	6 ft 3 in (1.91 m)	190 lb (86 kg)	So	Las Vegas, NV
G	3	Derrick Strings	6 ft 2 in (1.88 m)	180 lb (82 kg)	Sr	Pasadena, CA
G/F	23	Michael Wilder	6 ft 2 in (1.88 m)	215 lb (98 kg)	So	Long Beach, CA
F	34	Eric Wise	6 ft 6 in (1.98 m)	240 lb (109 kg)	Jr	Riverside, CA

Head coach

Russell Turner (Hampden–Sydney)

Assistant coach(es)

- Ali Ton (Davidson)
- Ryan Badrtalei (UCLA)
- Nick Booker (Davidson)

Legend

- (C) Team captain
- (S) Suspended
- (I) Ineligible
- (W) Walk-on
- Injured
- Current redshirt

Roster
Last update: September 19, 2017

== Schedule ==
Date time, TV	Rank^{#}	Opponent^{#}	Result	Record	Site (attendance) city, state
Regular Season
November 11, 2010*		at Illinois; 2K Sports Classic	L 65–79	0–1	State Farm Center (15,287); Champaign, IL
November 13, 2010*		at USC	L 49–62	0–2	Galen Center (3,125); Los Angeles, CA
November 19, 2010*		Navy; 2K Sports Classic	W 75–60	1–2	Bren Events Center (1,169); Irvine, CA
November 20, 2010*		Seattle; 2K Sports Classic	W 85–77	2–2	Bren Events Center (1,245); Irvine, CA
November 21, 2010*		Louisiana Tech; 2K Sports Classic	L 72–76	2–3	Bren Events Center (911); Irvine, CA
November 27, 2010*		at Marist	W 77–56	3–3	McCann Field House (1,586); Poughkeepsie, NY
December 1, 2010*		at San Diego	W 90–82	4–3	Jenny Craig Pavilion (1,235); San Diego
December 4, 2010*		San Jose State	L 70–85	4–4	Bren Events Center (1,347); Irvine, CA
December 10, 2010*		Wyoming	W 83–68	5–4	Bren Events Center (934); Irvine, CA
December 15, 2010*		Vanguard	W 99–63	6–4	Bren Events Center (742); Irvine, CA
December 18, 2010*		at Pepperdine	L 69–76	6–5	Firestone Fieldhouse (912); Malibu, CA
December 23, 2010*		at UCLA	L 73–74	6–6	Pauley Pavilion (6,380); Los Angeles, CA
December 28, 2010		UC Riverside	L 68–73	6–7 (0–1)	Bren Events Center (978); Irvine, CA
December 30, 2010*		Loyola Marymount	L 80–87	6–8	Bren Events Center (1,306); Irvine, CA
January 5, 2011		Cal State Fullerton	W 85–78	7–8 (1–1)	Bren Events Center (1,881); Irvine, CA
January 8, 2011		at Long Beach State	L 78–86	7–9 (1–2)	Walter Pyramid (2,299); Long Beach, CA
January 13, 2011		at UC Santa Barbara	L 58–71	7–10 (1–3)	UC Santa Barbara Events Center (3,288); Santa Barbara, CA
January 15, 2011		at Cal Poly	W 65–53	8–10 (2–3)	Mott Gym (2,747); San Luis Obispo, CA
January 19, 2011*		at Cal State Bakersfield	W 76–73	9–10	Rabobank Arena (1,442); Bakersfield, CA
January 22, 2011		Long Beach State	W 86–76	10–10 (3–3)	Bren Events Center (4,070); Irvine, CA
January 27, 2011		Cal State Northridge	L 62–66	10–11 (3–4)	Bren Events Center (1,115); Irvine, CA
January 29, 2011		at UC Davis	L 107–108 ^{2OT}	10–12 (3–5)	The Pavilion (2,315); Davis, California
February 3, 2011		at Cal State Fullerton	L 74–80	10–13 (3–6)	Titan Gym (946); Fullerton, CA
February 5, 2011		at Cal State Northridge	L 83–91	10–14 (3–7)	Matadome (1,185); Northridge, CA
February 10, 2011		Cal Poly	L 71–80	10–15 (3–8)	Bren Events Center (1,402); Irvine, CA
February 12, 2011		UC Santa Barbara	W 66–63	11–15 (4–8)	Bren Events Center (3,354); Irvine, CA
February 16, 2011		at Pacific	L 51–75	11–16 (4–9)	Alex G. Spanos Center (2,002); Stockton, CA
February 19, 2011*		at Nevada; ESPN BracketBusters	L 63–74	11–17	Lawlor Events Center (4,543); Reno, NV
February 24, 2011		UC Davis	W 96–87 ^{2OT}	12–17 (5–9)	Bren Events Center (1,140); Irvine, CA
February 26, 2011		Pacific	W 97–86 ^{2OT}	13–17 (6–9)	Bren Events Center (1,909); Irvine, CA
March 05, 2011		at UC Riverside	L 66–75	13–18 (6–10)	Student Recreation Center Arena (736); Riverside, CA
Big West tournament
March 10, 2011	(8)	vs. (1) Long Beach State; Big West Quarterfinals	L 72–79	13–19	Honda Center (3,000); Anaheim, CA
*Non-conference game. ^{#}Rankings from AP Poll. (#) Tournament seedings in parentheses. All times are in Pacific Time.

== Awards and honors ==
- Darren Moore
  - Big West Second Team All-Conference
