= Bob Williams (basketball, born 1953) =

American basketball coach

Biographical details
- Born: July 13, 1953 (age 73); Woodland, California, U.S.

Coaching career (HC unless noted)
- 1975–1976: San Lorenzo Valley HS (assistant)
- 1976–1978: Santa Cruz HS (JV)
- 1978–1979: Cabrillo CC
- 1979–1980: Lincoln HS
- 1980–1983: Cabrillo CC
- 1983–1988: Menlo
- 1988–1990: Pepperdine (assistant)
- 1990–1998: UC Davis
- 1998–2017: UC Santa Barbara

Head coaching record
- Overall: 492–339 (college)

Accomplishments and honors

Championships
- Division II National tournament (1998); 3× Big West tournament (2002, 2010, 2011); 4× Big West regular season (1999, 2003, 2008, 2010)

Awards
- 3× Big West Coach of the Year (1999, 2003, 2010)

Robert Allen Williams (born July 13, 1953) is an American college basketball coach and the former head men's basketball coach at UC Santa Barbara. He is sometimes referred to as the Dean of the Big West Conference's basketball coaches. He was previously the head coach at the UC Davis, winning the NCAA Men's Division II Basketball Championship in 1998. Williams is the all-time winningest coach at UC Santa Barbara with a 19-year record of 313–260.

== Coaching career ==
Prior to his arrival at UCSB, Williams spent eight years at UC Davis. His UC Davis teams recorded 20 or more wins five times and had an eight-year record of 158–76 record. In Williams’ final season at UC Davis, the Aggies went 31–2, won the NCAA Division II National Championship. Williams was named NABC Division II Coach of the Year.

Williams took over a UCSB program that had not recorded a winning season in five years. In 1998–99, the Gauchos won 15 games and won the West division of the Big West. The 2002 Gauchos won the school’s first Big West tournament title, advancing to the NCAA tournament. In 2003, they won the league’s regular season title and played in the NIT. In 2007–08, UCSB set the all time school record for most wins in a season with 23. They won the Big West regular season title for a second time and received a bid to the 2008 NIT.

The 2009–10 season marked the fourth Big West Regular Season title captured during Williams' tenure at UCSB. It also was the first time in the basketball program's history that the Gauchos won both the Big West Regular Season and Big West tournament championships in the same year. Williams was also awarded the 2010 Big West Coach of the Year Award, his third. It marked the school's second trip to the NCAA tournament under Williams.

On Feb. 5, 2011, he recorded his 400th career win when his team defeated UC Davis. The 2011 team also garnered their second consecutive NCAA tournament bid. Williams became UCSB’s all-time leader in coaching victories when, on January 2, 2012, his team defeated Cal Poly. The 2015–16 Gauchos were invited to play at the inaugural Vegas 16 at the Mandalay Bay Hotel and Casino in Las Vegas. The postseason bid was the eighth for the program under Williams and a victory over Northern Illinois in the first round was its first postseason win since 1990.

Following a disappointing 2016–17 season, Williams was informed that he would not return as head coach after 19 years with the school.

== Head coaching record ==
=== College ===
Record table
Season	Team	Overall	Conference	Standing	Postseason
Menlo Oaks (Independent (NCAA III)) (1986–1988)
1986–87	Menlo	12–14			
1987–88	Menlo	16–10			
Menlo:		28–24 (.538)			
UC Davis Aggies (Northern California Athletic Conference) (1990–1998)
1990–91	UC Davis	20–8	11–3	2nd	
1991–92	UC Davis	19–11	11–3	2nd	
1992–93	UC Davis	13–14	9–5	3rd	
1993–94	UC Davis	11–15	7–7	5th	
1994–95	UC Davis	20–11	13–1	1st	NCAA Division II Semifinals
1995–96	UC Davis	24–6	14–0	1st	NCAA Division II Semifinals
1996–97	UC Davis	20–9	11–3	T–1st	NCAA Division II First Round
1997–98	UC Davis	31–2	14–0	1st	NCAA Division II National Champions
UC Davis:		158–76 (.675)	90–22 (.804)		
UC Santa Barbara Gauchos (Big West Conference) (1998–2017)
1998–99	UC Santa Barbara	15–13	12–4	1st (West)	
1999–00	UC Santa Barbara	14–14	10–6	2nd (West)	
2000–01	UC Santa Barbara	13–15	9–7	4th	
2001–02	UC Santa Barbara	20–11	11–7	T–3rd	NCAA Division I Round of 64
2002–03	UC Santa Barbara	18–14	14–4	1st	NIT First Round
2003–04	UC Santa Barbara	16–12	10–8	3rd	
2004–05	UC Santa Barbara	11–18	7–11	T–6th	
2005–06	UC Santa Barbara	15–14	6–8	5th	
2006–07	UC Santa Barbara	18–11	9–5	T–3rd	
2007–08	UC Santa Barbara	23–9	12–4	T–1st	NIT First Round
2008–09	UC Santa Barbara	16–15	8–8	T–4th	
2009–10	UC Santa Barbara	20–10	12–4	T–1st	NCAA Division I Round of 64
2010–11	UC Santa Barbara	18–14	8–8	T-4th	NCAA Division I Round of 64
2011–12	UC Santa Barbara	20–11	12–4	T–2nd	CIT First Round
2012–13	UC Santa Barbara	11–20	7–11	7th	
2013–14	UC Santa Barbara	21–9	12–4	2nd	
2014–15	UC Santa Barbara	19–14	11–5	T–2nd	CBI First Round
2015–16	UC Santa Barbara	19–14	11–5	4th	Vegas 16 Semifinal
2016–17	UC Santa Barbara	6–22	4–12	9th	
UC Santa Barbara:		313–260 (.546)	185–125 (.597)		
Total:		499–360(.581)			
National champion Postseason invitational champion Conference regular season champion Conference regular season and conference tournament champion Division regular season champion Division regular season and conference tournament champion Conference tournament champion
