= 2010–11 Long Beach State 49ers men's basketball team =

American college basketball season

2010–11 Long Beach State 49ers men's basketball
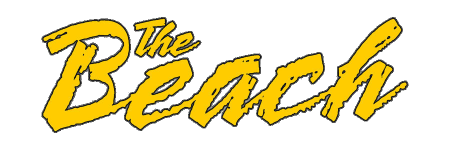

Big West Regular Season champions

NIT, First Round
- Conference: Big West Conference
- Record: 22–12 (14–2 Big West)
- Head coach: Dan Monson (4th season)
- Assistant coaches: Vic Couch (4th season); Eric Brown (4th season); Rod Palmer (4th season)
- Home arena: Walter Pyramid

2010–11 Big West men's basketball standings
	Conf.				Overall
Team	W		L	PCT	W		L	PCT
Long Beach State	14	–	2	.875	22	–	12	.647
Cal Poly	10	–	6	.625	15	–	15	.500
Cal State Northridge	9	–	7	.563	14	–	18	.438
UC Santa Barbara†	8	–	8	.500	18	–	14	.563
Pacific	8	–	8	.500	16	–	15	.516
Cal State Fullerton	7	–	9	.438	11	–	20	.355
UC Irvine	6	–	10	.375	13	–	19	.406
UC Riverside	6	–	10	.375	12	–	19	.387
UC Davis	4	–	12	.250	10	–	20	.333
† 2011 Big West tournament winner As of March 15, 2012; Rankings from AP Poll

The 2010–11 Long Beach State 49ers men's basketball team represented California State University, Long Beach in the 2010–11 NCAA Division I men's basketball season. The 49ers, led by head coach Dan Monson, played their home games at Walter Pyramid in Long Beach, California, as members of the Big West Conference. The 49ers won the Big West regular season title by 4 games, and advanced to the championship game of the Big West tournament. In the title game, Long Beach State was upset by fifth-seeded UC Santa Barbara.

Long Beach State failed to qualify for the NCAA tournament, but received an automatic bid to the 2011 NIT as the regular-season champions of the Big West Conference. The 49ers were eliminated in the first round of the NIT by Washington State, 85–74.

== Roster ==
2010–11 Long Beach State 49ers men's basketball team
Players
Coaches

Pos.	#	Name	Height	Weight	Year	Hometown
G	2	Tristan Wilson	6 ft 5 in (1.96 m)	—	Sr	Chicago, Illinois
G	3	Greg Plater	6 ft 1 in (1.85 m)	—	Sr	Salem, Oregon
F	4	Eugene Phelps	6 ft 6 in (1.98 m)	—	Jr	Los Angeles, California
G	5	Brandon Nevens	6 ft 3 in (1.91 m)	—	Sr	Long Beach, California
F	11	Lin Chang	6 ft 9 in (2.06 m)	—	Jr	Beijing, China
G	12	Corey Jackson	6 ft 0 in (1.83 m)	—	Jr	Brentwood, New York
F	13	Edis Dervisevic	6 ft 8 in (2.03 m)	—	Jr	New York, New York
C	14	Mike Vantrimpont	7 ft 0 in (2.13 m)	—	So	Los Angeles, California
F	15	Jacob Thomas	6 ft 4 in (1.93 m)	—	Fr	Columbia Heights, Minnesota
F	20	T.J. Robinson	6 ft 8 in (2.03 m)	—	Jr	West Haven, Connecticut
G	21	Larry Anderson	6 ft 5 in (1.96 m)	—	Jr	Long Beach, California
G	22	Casper Ware	5 ft 10 in (1.78 m)	—	Jr	Cerritos, California
G/F	23	Sean Starkey	6 ft 4 in (1.93 m)	—	Jr	Huntington Beach, California
G	25	Jerramy King	5 ft 11 in (1.8 m)	—	So	La Canada, California
F	33	Nick Shepherd	6 ft 9 in (2.06 m)	—	Fr	Missouri City, Texas
F	34	Kyle Richardson	6 ft 7 in (2.01 m)	—	So	Lakewood, California

Head coach

- Dan Monson (Idaho)

Assistant coach(es)

- Vic Couch (Santa Clara)
- Eric Brown (Cal State Northridge)
- Rod Palmer (UC Irvine)

Legend

- (C) Team captain
- (S) Suspended
- (I) Ineligible
- (W) Walk-on
- Injured
- Current redshirt

Roster
Last update: January 17, 2023

== Schedule and results ==
Date time, TV	Rank^{#}	Opponent^{#}	Result	Record	Site city, state
Regular season
November 13, 2010*; 4:05 pm		No. 25 San Diego State; Homecoming	L 65–81	0–1	Walter Pyramid; Long Beach, CA
November 15, 2010*; 7:05 pm		San Francisco State	W 82–65	1–1	Walter Pyramid; Long Beach, CA
November 19, 2010*; 12:30 pm		vs. Clemson; Paradise Jam	L 55–69	1–2	Sports and Fitness Center; Saint Thomas, USVI
November 20, 2010*; 12:30 pm		vs. Saint Peter's; Paradise Jam	W 68–56	2–2	Sports and Fitness Center; Saint Thomas, USVI
November 22, 2010*; 12:30 pm		vs. Iowa; Paradise Jam	W 78–72	3–2	Sports and Fitness Center; Saint Thomas, USVI
November 27, 2010*; 7:05 pm		at Loyola Marymount	L 77–80 ^{OT}	3–3	Walter Pyramid; Long Beach, CA
November 30, 2010*; 8:00 pm		at No. 23 Washington	L 75–102	3–4	Hec Edmundson Pavilion; Seattle, WA
December 2, 2010*; 7:05 pm		BYU–Hawaii	W 90–83	4–4	Walter Pyramid; Long Beach, CA
December 5, 2010*; 1:05 pm		at Boise State	W 69–66	5–4	Taco Bell Arena; Boise, ID
December 7, 2010*; 6:05 pm		at Utah State	L 53–81	5–5	Smith Spectrum; Logan, UT
December 11, 2010*; 4:00 pm		at North Carolina	L 91–96	5–6	Dean Smith Center; Chapel Hill, NC
December 18, 2010*; 11:45 am		vs. Saint Mary's; Wooden Classic	L 74–82	5–7	Honda Center; Anaheim, CA
December 21, 2010*; 4:00 pm		at Arizona State	L 55–72	5–8	Wells Fargo Arena; Tempe, AZ
December 28, 2010; 8:00 pm		at UC Santa Barbara	W 71–55	6–8 (1–0)	UC Santa Barbara Events Center; Santa Barbara, CA
December 30, 2010; 7:00 pm		at Cal Poly	W 69–53	7–8 (2–0)	Mott Gym; San Luis Obispo, CA
January 5, 2011; 7:05 pm		Cal State Northridge	W 85–71	8–8 (3–0)	Walter Pyramid; Long Beach, CA
January 8, 2011; 4:05 pm		UC Irvine	W 86–78	9–8 (4–0)	Walter Pyramid; Long Beach, CA
January 12, 2011; 8:00 pm		UC Davis	W 60–56	10–8 (5–0)	Walter Pyramid; Long Beach, CA
January 15, 2011; 8:00 pm		Pacific	W 70–69	11–8 (6–0)	Walter Pyramid; Long Beach, CA
January 19, 2011; 7:05 pm		at Cal State Fullerton	L 87–89	11–9 (6–1)	Titan Gym; Fullerton, CA
January 22, 2011; 7:05 pm		at UC Irvine	L 76–86	11–10 (6–2)	Bren Events Center (1,768); Irvine, CA
January 26, 2011; 7:00 pm		at Pacific	W 67–66	12–10 (7–2)	Alex G. Spanos Center; Stockton, CA
January 29, 2011; 7:30 pm		Cal State Fullerton	W 75–60	13–10 (8–2)	Walter Pyramid; Long Beach, CA
February 10, 2011; 7:00 pm		at UC Davis	W 93–69	14–10 (9–2)	The Pavilion; Davis, CA
February 12, 2011; 7:05 pm		at Cal State Northridge	W 79–62	15–10 (10–2)	The Matadome; Northridge, CA
February 16, 2011; 7:05 pm		UC Riverside	W 68–55	16–10 (11–2)	Walter Pyramid; Long Beach, CA
February 19, 2011*; 8:00 pm		Montana; ESPN BracketBusters	W 74–56	17–10	Walter Pyramid; Long Beach, CA
February 24, 2011; 7:05 pm		Cal Poly	W 61–55	18–10 (12–2)	Walter Pyramid; Long Beach, CA
February 26, 2011; 5:05 pm		UC Santa Barbara	W 71–53	19–10 (13–2)	Walter Pyramid; Long Beach, CA
March 2, 2011; 8:00 pm		at UC Riverside	W 82–76	20–10 (14–2)	UC Riverside Student Recreation Center; Riverside, CA
Big West tournament
March 10, 2011; 12:00 pm	(1)	vs. (8) UC Irvine; Big West Quarterfinals	W 79–72	21–10	Honda Center; Anaheim, CA
March 11, 2011; 6:30 pm	(1)	vs. (7) UC Riverside; Big West Semifinals	W 74–63	22–10	Honda Center; Anaheim, CA
March 12, 2011; 5:00 pm	(1)	vs. (5) UC Santa Barbara; Big West Championship	L 56–64	22–11	Honda Center; Anaheim, CA
NIT
March 16, 2011; 7:00 pm	(7 BC)	at (2 BC) Washington State; NIT First Round	L 74–85	22–12	Beasley Coliseum; Pullman, WA
*Non-conference game. ^{#}Rankings from AP Poll. (#) Tournament seedings in parentheses. All times are in Pacific Time.
