= Steve Kinney =

American football player (born 1949)

No. 63
- Position: Tackle

Personal information
- Born: June 27, 1949 (age 77); San Jose, California, U.S.
- Listed height: 6 ft 5 in (1.96 m)
- Listed weight: 255 lb (116 kg)

Career information
- High school: Willow Glen (San Jose, California)
- College: Utah State
- NFL draft: 1972: undrafted

Career history
- Chicago Bears (1972–1974); Chicago Winds (1975); Philadelphia Bell (1975); Washington Redskins (1976)*
- * Offseason or practice squad member only
- Stats at Pro Football Reference

Steven Arthur Kinney (born June 27, 1949) is an American former professional football player who was a tackle for the Chicago Bears of National Football League (NFL). He played college football for the Utah State Aggies.
