= Willow Glen High School =

Coordinates: 37.2899°N 121.8971°W

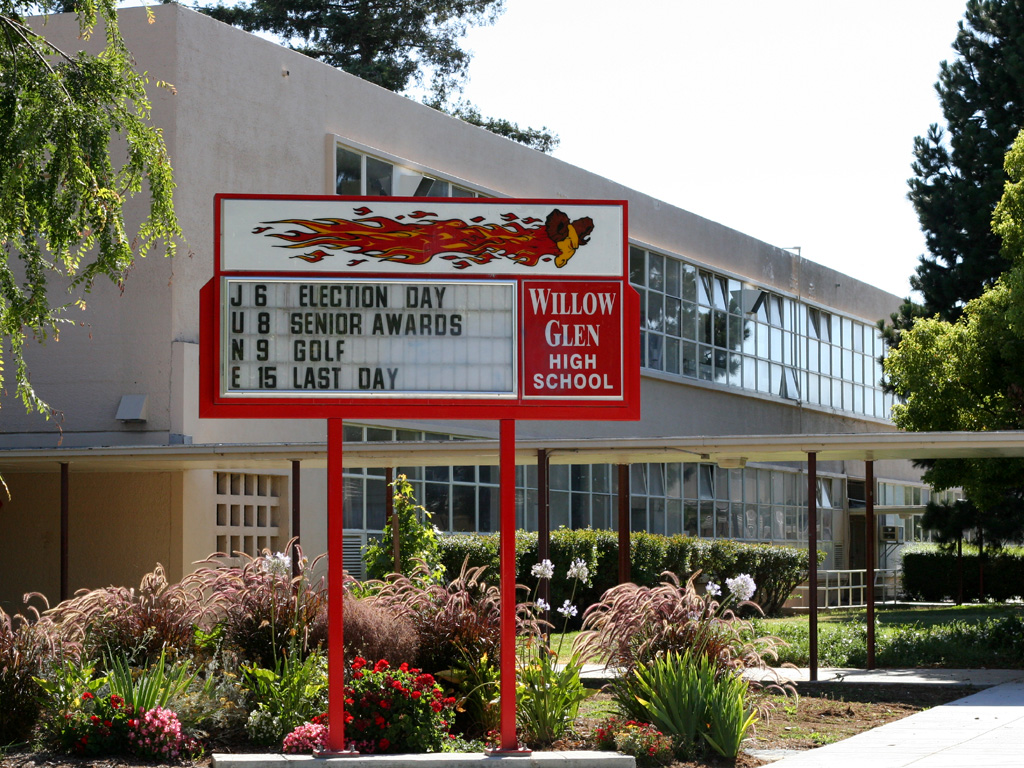

Location
- 2001 Cottle Ave; San Jose, California 95125; USA

Information
- Type: Public
- Established: 1950
- School district: San Jose Unified School District
- Principal: Amy Hanna
- Staff: 75.67 (FTE)
- Grades: 9-12
- Enrollment: 1,656 (2022–23)
- Student to teacher ratio: 21.88
- Colors: Red and Gold
- Mascot: Ram
- Yearbook: Rambler (1952-1988, 2023-present)
- Website: wghs.sjusd.org//

Willow Glen High School is a public high school in the Willow Glen neighborhood of San Jose, California, within the San Jose Unified School District.

== Athletics ==
Willow Glen High School has a swimming pool, a basketball court/gym and weight training room, a mini-gym that serves as a wrestling area, a baseball field, a softball field, a multi-purpose track and turf area, a sand volleyball court, and tennis courts.

Willow Glen High School Boys' Volleyball won a CCS Championship in 2009, one of the first public schools to do so in that CCS division. Also, in 2010, Willow Glen High School Football won a CCS Championship against Sequoia High School. From 1972 to 1980, the boys' basketball team was coached by the notable collegiate coach Bob Burton. Willow Glen's Baseball team won a CCS championship in 2013. The Willow Glen boys' cross country team won the Division 2 CCS championship in 2010 for the first time in twenty-six years, winning again in 2019. Willow Glen girls' cross country team won the Division 3 CCS Championship in 2022 for the first time ever, and placed 5th that year at the CIF state championship meet in Woodward Park.

== Performing Arts ==
Willow Glen High School offers music and drama courses.

== Notable alumni ==
- Herschel “Guy” Beahm IV, Dr. Disrespect, YouTube Streamer
- Bob Berry, NFL quarterback for 12 seasons, class of 1960
- Anthony Canzano, Professional baseball player, class of 1965
- Macklin Celebrini, 1st pick in the 2024 NHL entry draft, center for the San Jose Sharks (attended as a freshman)
- Jeffrey Foskett, guitarist and singer for The Beach Boys
- Holly Hallstrom, model on The Price Is Right
- Nick Jennings, director, artist, writer, producer
- Steve Kinney, former NFL player
- Eric Kretz, drummer for the Stone Temple Pilots
- Julio Morales, professional soccer player
- Sal Maccarone, Sculptor/Author
- Ann Ravel, attorney and public servant, Class of 1967
- Steve Sordello, LinkedIn CFO, Class of 1987
- Jonah Underwood, professional basketball player Amancay de La Rioja
