= 1977 Pacific Coast Athletic Association men's basketball tournament =

- Classification: Division I
- Season: 1976–77
- Teams: 6
- Site: Anaheim Convention Center; Anaheim, CA
- Champions: Long Beach State (1st title)
- Winning coach: Dwight Jones (1st title)
- MVP: None
- Pacific Coast Athletic Association men's basketball tournaments

1976–77 Pacific Coast Athletic Association men's basketball standings
	Conf.				Overall
Team	W		L	PCT	W		L	PCT
Long Beach State †	9	–	3	.750	21	–	8	.724
San Diego State	9	–	3	.750	13	–	15	.464
San Jose State	8	–	4	.667	18	–	11	.621
Cal State Fullerton	7	–	5	.583	16	–	10	.615
Pacific	5	–	7	.417	11	–	14	.440
UC Santa Barbara	3	–	9	.250	8	–	18	.308
Fresno State	1	–	11	.083	7	–	20	.259
† 1977 PCAA Tournament winner Rankings from AP Poll

The 1977 Pacific Coast Athletic Association men's basketball tournament (now known as the Big West Conference men's basketball tournament) was held March 2–6 at the Anaheim Convention Center in Anaheim, California.

Long Beach State defeated San Jose State in the championship game, 76–63, to win their first PCAA/Big West men's basketball tournament.

The 49ers, in turn, received a bid to the 1977 NCAA tournament, where they lost to Idaho State in the first round.

== Format ==
The tournament field expanded from four to seven teams. Long Beach State, by virtue of tying with San Diego State for the regular season title but winning the tie breaker by sweeping them, received a first round bye while the other six teams were seeded for the first round based on regular season conference records. The 2nd through 4th seeds hosted the 5th through 7th seeds on their home courts. The three winners of those games and Long Beach State moved on to the semifinal round at the Anaheim Convention Center.

== Bracket ==
First round Wednesday, March 2
5	Pacific	68
4	Cal State Fullerton	79
3	San Jose State	71
6	UC Santa Barbara	52
7	Fresno State	41
2	San Diego State	51

Semifinals; Thursday, March 3
1	Long Beach State	65*
4	Cal State Fullerton	64
3	San Jose State	75
2	San Diego State	74

Championship; Sunday, March 6
1	Long Beach State	76
3	San Jose State	63
