= 2001–02 Idaho Vandals men's basketball team =

American college basketball season

2001–02 Idaho Vandals men's basketball
- Conference: Big West Conference
- Record: 9–19 (6–12 Big West)
- Head coach: Leonard Perry (1st season)
- Home arena: Cowan Spectrum

2001–02 Big West men's basketball standings
	Conf.				Overall
Team	W		L	PCT	W		L	PCT
Utah State	13	–	5	.722	23	–	8	.742
UC Irvine	13	–	5	.722	21	–	11	.656
UC Santa Barbara †	11	–	7	.611	20	–	11	.645
Pacific	11	–	7	.611	20	–	10	.667
Cal State Northridge	11	–	7	.611	12	–	16	.429
Cal Poly	9	–	9	.500	15	–	12	.556
Long Beach State	9	–	9	.500	13	–	17	.433
Idaho	6	–	12	.333	9	–	19	.321
UC Riverside	5	–	13	.278	8	–	18	.308
Cal State Fullerton	2	–	16	.111	5	–	22	.185
† 2002 Big West tournament winner As of April 10, 2002; Rankings from AP poll

The 2001–02 Idaho Vandals men's basketball team represented the University of Idaho during the 2001–02 NCAA Division I men's basketball season. Members of the Big West Conference, the Vandals were led by first-year head coach Leonard Perry and played their home games on campus at Cowan Spectrum in Moscow, Idaho.

The Vandals were 9–18 overall in the regular season and 6–12 in conference play, eighth in the standings. They met league champion and top-seed Utah State in the first round of the conference tournament in Anaheim and lost by twenty points.

== Postseason result ==
Date time, TV	Rank^{#}	Opponent^{#}	Result	Record	Site (attendance) city, state
Big West tournament
Thu, March 7; 2:30 pm	(8)	vs. (1) Utah State; Quarterfinal	L 41–61	9–19	Anaheim Convention Center (1,781); Anaheim, California
*Non-conference game. (#) Tournament seedings in parentheses. All times are in Pacific time.
