= 2002 Big West Conference men's basketball tournament =

- Classification: Division I
- Season: 2001–02
- Teams: 8
- Site: Anaheim Convention Center; Anaheim, CA
- Champions: UC Santa Barbara (1st title)
- Winning coach: Bob Williams (1st title)
- MVP: Nick Jones (UC Santa Barbara)

2001–02 Big West men's basketball standings
	Conf.				Overall
Team	W		L	PCT	W		L	PCT
Utah State	13	–	5	.722	23	–	8	.742
UC Irvine	13	–	5	.722	21	–	11	.656
UC Santa Barbara †	11	–	7	.611	20	–	11	.645
Pacific	11	–	7	.611	20	–	10	.667
Cal State Northridge	11	–	7	.611	12	–	16	.429
Cal Poly	9	–	9	.500	15	–	12	.556
Long Beach State	9	–	9	.500	13	–	17	.433
Idaho	6	–	12	.333	9	–	19	.321
UC Riverside	5	–	13	.278	8	–	18	.308
Cal State Fullerton	2	–	16	.111	5	–	22	.185
† 2002 Big West tournament winner As of April 10, 2002; Rankings from AP poll

The 2002 Big West Conference men's basketball tournament was held March 7–9 at Anaheim Convention Center in Anaheim, California.

UC Santa Barbara defeated Utah State in the championship game, 60–56, to obtain the first Big West Conference men's basketball tournament championship in school history.

The Gauchos participated in the 2002 NCAA Division I men's basketball tournament after earning the conference's automatic bid.

== Format ==
Eight of the ten teams in the conference participated, with UC Riverside and Cal State Fullerton not qualifying. Teams were seeded based on regular season conference records.

== Bracket ==
Quarterfinals; Friday, March 7
1	Utah State	61
8	Idaho	41
4	Pacific	78
5	Cal State Northridge	66
6	Cal Poly	65
3	UC Santa Barbara	74
7	Long Beach State	65
2	UC Irvine	72

Semifinals; Saturday, March 8
1	Utah State	69
4	Pacific	65
3	UC Santa Barbara	66
2	UC Irvine	61

Championship; Sunday, March 9
1	Utah State	56
3	UC Santa Barbara	60
