= 1976 Pacific Coast Athletic Association men's basketball tournament =

- Classification: Division I
- Season: 1975–76
- Teams: 4
- Site: Stockton Memorial Civic Auditorium; Stockton, CA
- Champions: San Diego State (1st title)
- Winning coach: Tim Vezie (1st title)
- MVP: None
- Pacific Coast Athletic Association men's basketball tournaments

The 1976 Pacific Coast Athletic Association men's basketball tournament (now known as the Big West Conference men's basketball tournament) was held March 6–7 at the Stockton Memorial Civic Auditorium in Stockton, California. This was the first edition of the tournament.

San Diego State defeated Pacific in the championship game, 76–64, to win their first PCAA/Big West men's basketball tournament.

The Aztecs, in turn, received a bid to the 1976 NCAA tournament.

== Format ==
Despite the PCAA containing six members for the 1975–76 season, only the top four teams from the standings took part in the tournament field.

== Bracket ==
Semifinals; Saturday, March 6
1	Cal State Fullerton	64
4	Pacific	72
3	San Diego State	67
2	San Jose State	64

Championship; Sunday, March 7
4	Pacific	64
3	San Diego State	76
