= 2007–08 UC Irvine Anteaters men's basketball team =

American college basketball season

2007–08 UC Irvine Anteaters men's basketball
- Conference: Big West Conference
- Record: 18–16 (9–7 Big West)
- Head coach: Pat Douglass (11th season)
- Home arena: Bren Events Center

2007–08 Big West men's basketball standings
	Conf.				Overall
Team	W		L	PCT	W		L	PCT
UC Santa Barbara	12	–	4	.750	23	–	9	.719
Cal State Northridge	12	–	4	.750	20	–	10	.667
Cal State Fullerton†	12	–	4	.750	24	–	9	.727
Pacific	11	–	5	.688	21	–	10	.677
UC Irvine	9	–	7	.563	18	–	16	.529
Cal Poly	7	–	9	.438	12	–	18	.400
UC Riverside	4	–	12	.250	9	–	21	.300
Long Beach State	3	–	13	.188	6	–	25	.194
UC Davis	2	–	14	.125	9	–	22	.290
† 2008 Big West tournament winner As of April 10, 2008; Rankings from AP poll

The 2007–08 UC Irvine Anteaters men's basketball team represented the University of California, Irvine during the 2007–08 NCAA Division I men's basketball season. The Anteaters were led by 11th year head coach Pat Douglass and played at the Bren Events Center. They were members of the Big West Conference.

== Previous season ==
The 2006–07 UC Irvine Anteaters men's basketball team finished the season with a record of 15–18 and 6–8 in Big West play.

== Off-Season ==
=== Incoming transfers ===
Name	Number	Pos.	Height	Weight	Year	Hometown	Previous School
Trey Harris	25	PG	6'0"	170	Junior	McCook, NE	Junior college transfer from McCook Community College
Brett Lauer	23	SG	6'1"	180	Junior	Mission Viejo, CA	Junior college transfer from San Diego Mesa College
Adam Rodenberg		SF	6'6"	235	Junior	Cedar Rapids, IA	Junior college transfer from Kirkwood Community College

=== 2007 recruiting class ===
College recruiting information (2007)
Name	Hometown	School	Height	Weight	Commit date
Derrick Strings; SG	Lawndale, CA	Leuzinger High School	6 ft 2 in (1.88 m)	185 lb (84 kg)	Apr 27, 2007
Derrick Strings; SG	Recruit ratings: 247Sports: (88)				
Matt Ballard; C	Foothill Ranch, CA	Trabuco Hills High School	6 ft 8 in (2.03 m)	225 lb (102 kg)	Feb 7, 2007
Matt Ballard; C	Recruit ratings: No ratings found				
Overall recruit ranking:
Note: In many cases, Scout, Rivals, 247Sports, On3, and ESPN may conflict in their listings of height and weight.; In these cases, the average was taken. ESPN grades are on a 100-point scale.; Sources: "2007 UC Irvine Player Commits". ESPN.; "2007 Team Ranking". Rivals.

== Roster ==
2007–08 UC Irvine Anteaters men's basketball team
Players
Coaches

Pos.	#	Name	Height	Weight	Year	Hometown
G	3	Chuma Awaji	6 ft 3 in (1.91 m)	200 lb (91 kg)	Sr	Los Angeles, CA
C	34	Matt Ballard	6 ft 8 in (2.03 m)	225 lb (102 kg)	Fr	Foothill Ranch, CA
G	22	Chad DeCasas	6 ft 5 in (1.96 m)	215 lb (98 kg)	So	Mission Viejo, CA
C	33	Darren Fells	6 ft 7 in (2.01 m)	255 lb (116 kg)	Sr	Fullerton, CA
G	25	Trey Harris	6 ft 0 in (1.83 m)	175 lb (79 kg)	Jr	Colorado Springs, CO
G	5	Michael Hunter	5 ft 10 in (1.78 m)	160 lb (73 kg)	So	Aurora, CO
G	20	Justin Johnson	6 ft 2 in (1.88 m)	165 lb (75 kg)	So	El Segundo, CA
G	23	Brett Lauer	6 ft 1 in (1.85 m)	180 lb (82 kg)	Jr	Concord, CA
G	12	Chad McDaniel	6 ft 0 in (1.83 m)	175 lb (79 kg)	Jr	Rosamond, CA
G	2	Marcus McIntosh	6 ft 1 in (1.85 m)	186 lb (84 kg)	Sr	Aurora, CO
G	10	Patrick Rembert	6 ft 0 in (1.83 m)	188 lb (85 kg)	Fr	Long Beach, CA
F	21	Patrick Sanders	6 ft 6 in (1.98 m)	205 lb (93 kg)	Sr	Corona, CA
G	3	Derrick Strings	6 ft 2 in (1.88 m)	180 lb (82 kg)	Fr	Pasadena, CA

Head coach

Pat Douglass

Assistant coach(es)

Legend

- (C) Team captain
- (S) Suspended
- (I) Ineligible
- (W) Walk-on
- Injured
- Current redshirt

Roster

== Schedule ==
Date time, TV	Rank^{#}	Opponent^{#}	Result	Record	Site (attendance) city, state
Regular Season
November 9, 2007*		Loyola Marymount	W 74–61	1–0	Bren Events Center (823); Irvine, CA
November 13, 2007*		Nevada	L 68–77	1–1	Bren Events Center (1,007); Irvine, CA
November 17, 2007*		Utah State	W 70–51	2–1	Bren Events Center (1,906); Irvine, CA
November 22, 2007*		vs. Mississippi State; Anaheim Classic	L 53–68	2–3	Anaheim Convention Center (1,387); Anaheim, CA
November 23, 2007*		vs. Chattanooga; Anaheim Classic	L 80–85	2–4	Anaheim Convention Center (1,447); Anaheim, CA
November 25, 2007*		vs. San Diego; Anaheim Classic	L 57–60	2–5	Anaheim Convention Center (897); Anaheim, CA
December 1, 2007*		at Utah	L 66–78	2–5	Huntsman Center (8,137); Salt Lake City, UT
December 8, 2007*		Alaska	W 87–53	3–5	Bren Events Center (3,155); Irvine, CA
December 15, 2007*		San Francisco	W 72–59	4–5	Bren Events Center (1,104); Irvine, CA
December 20, 2007*		at Sam Houston State	L 54–61	4–6	Johnson Coliseum (1,761); Huntsville, TX
December 22, 2007*		at No. 14 Texas A&M	L 66–88	4–7	Reed Arena (8,064); College Station, TX
December 28, 2007*		at South Carolina	L 65–67	4–8	Colonial Life Arena (10,569); Columbia, SC
December 30, 2007*		at Harvard	W 80–77 ^{OT}	5–8	Lavietes Pavilion (976); Cambridge, MA
January 4, 2008		at Cal State Fullerton	L 89–93	5–9 (0–1)	Titan Gym (948); Fullerton, CA
January 10, 2008		UC Santa Barbara	W 66–63	6–9 (1–1)	Bren Events Center (2,392); Irvine, CA
January 12, 2008		Cal Poly	W 73–69	7–9 (2–1)	Bren Events Center (1,512); Irvine, CA
January 17, 2008		at UC Davis	L 57–74	7–10 (2–2)	The Pavilion (2,478); Davis, CA
January 19, 2008		at Pacific	L 53–59	7–11 (2–3)	Alex G. Spanos Center (3,653); Stockton, CA
January 26, 2008		UC Riverside	W 67–53	8–11 (3–3)	Bren Events Center (1,855); Irvine, CA
January 31, 2008		at Cal State Northridge	L 64–69	8–12 (3–4)	Matadome (1,508); Northridge, CA
February 2, 2008		at Long Beach State	W 70–48	9–12 (3–5)	Walter Pyramid (2,406); Long Beach, CA
February 7, 2008		at Cal Poly	L 56–57	9–13 (3–6)	Mott Gym (1,676); San Luis Obispo, CA
February 9, 2008		at UC Santa Barbara	W 65–59	10–13 (4–6)	UC Santa Barbara Events Center (3,217); Santa Barbara, CA
February 14, 2008		Pacific	W 74–59	11–13 (5–6)	Bren Events Center (1,085); Irvine, CA
February 20, 2008		at UC Riverside	L 76–85	11–14 (5–7)	UC Riverside Student Recreation Center (366); Riverside, CA
February 23, 2008*		Idaho; Bracketbrackers	W 69–55	12–14	Bren Events Center (1,570); Irvine, CA
February 28, 2008		Long Beach State	W 64–57	13–14 (6–7)	Bren Events Center (1,642); Irvine, CA
March 1, 2008		Cal State Northridge	W 82–66	14–14 (7–7)	Bren Events Center (3,173); Irvine, CA
March 6, 2008		UC Davis	W 79–62	15–14 (8–7)	Bren Events Center (1,281); Irvine, CA
March 8, 2008		Cal State Fullerton	L 66–74	15–15 (8–8)	Bren Events Center (2,285); Irvine, CA
Big West Conference tournament
March 12, 2008; 6:00 pm		vs. Long Beach State; First Round	W 77–63	16–15	Anaheim Convention Center (1,392); Anaheim, CA
March 13, 2008; 8:30 pm		vs. Pacific; Quarterfinals	W 57–56	17–15	Anaheim Convention Center (2,295); Anaheim, CA
March 14, 2008; 5:30 pm		vs. UC Santa Barbara; Semifinals	W 55–50	18–15	Anaheim Convention Center (3,134); Anaheim, CA
March 15, 2008; 8:00 pm		vs. Cal State Fullerton; Championship Game	L 66–81	18–16	Anaheim Convention Center (4,234); Anaheim, CA
*Non-conference game. ^{#}Rankings from AP Poll. (#) Tournament seedings in parentheses. All times are in Pacific Time.

== Awards and honors ==
- Patrick Sanders
  - All-Big West First Team
- Darren Fells
  - All-Big West Second Team
