= 2001–02 UC Santa Barbara Gauchos men's basketball team =

American college basketball season

2001–02 UC Santa Barbara Gauchos men's basketball

Big West tournament champions

NCAA tournament, First round
- Conference: Big West Conference
- Record: 20–11 (11–7 Big West)
- Head coach: Bob Williams (4th season)
- Home arena: The Thunderdome

2001–02 Big West men's basketball standings
	Conf.				Overall
Team	W		L	PCT	W		L	PCT
Utah State	13	–	5	.722	23	–	8	.742
UC Irvine	13	–	5	.722	21	–	11	.656
UC Santa Barbara †	11	–	7	.611	20	–	11	.645
Pacific	11	–	7	.611	20	–	10	.667
Cal State Northridge	11	–	7	.611	12	–	16	.429
Cal Poly	9	–	9	.500	15	–	12	.556
Long Beach State	9	–	9	.500	13	–	17	.433
Idaho	6	–	12	.333	9	–	19	.321
UC Riverside	5	–	13	.278	8	–	18	.308
Cal State Fullerton	2	–	16	.111	5	–	22	.185
† 2002 Big West tournament winner As of April 10, 2002; Rankings from AP poll

The 2001–02 UC Santa Barbara Gauchos men's basketball team represented the University of California, Santa Barbara during the 2001–02 college basketball season. They were led by head coach Bob Williams in his 4th season at UCSB. The Gauchos were members of the Big West Conference and played their home games at the UC Santa Barbara Events Center, also known as The Thunderdome.

They finished the season 20–11, 11–7 in Big West play to finish in third place in the regular season standings. As the No. 3 seed in the Big West tournament, they defeated UC Davis and Long Beach State to earn the conference's automatic bid to the NCAA tournament. As a No. 14 seed in the West region, they lost in the first round to No. 3 seed Arizona.

== Roster ==
2001–02 UCSB Gauchos men's basketball team
Players	Coaches
Pos. / # / Name / Height / Weight / Year / Hometown; F / 30 / Mark Hull / 6 ft 7 in (2.01 m) / 210 lb (95 kg) / Sr / Glendale, California	Head coach: Bob Williams; Assistant coach(es) Legend: (C) Team captain; (S) Suspended; (I) Ineligible; (W) Walk-on; Injured; Current redshirt; Roster

== Schedule and results ==
Date time, TV	Rank^{#}	Opponent^{#}	Result	Record	Site (attendance) city, state
Regular season
Nov 26, 2001*		at USC	L 62–73	2–1	L.A. Sports Arena; Los Angeles, California
Dec 8, 2001*		Pepperdine	W 68–51	5–2	The Thunderdome; Santa Barbara, California
Big West tournament
Mar 7, 2002*		vs. Cal Poly; Quarterfinals	W 74–65	18–10	Honda Center; San Jose, California
Mar 8, 2002*		vs. UC Irvine; Semifinals	W 66–61	19–10	Honda Center; San Jose, California
Mar 9, 2002*		vs. Utah State; Championship game	W 60–56	20–10	Honda Center; San Jose, California
NCAA tournament
Mar 14, 2002*	(14 W)	vs. (3 W) No. 7 Arizona; First round	L 81–86	20–11	University Arena; Albuquerque, New Mexico
*Non-conference game. ^{#}Rankings from AP Poll. (#) Tournament seedings in parentheses. All times are in Pacific Time; Source.
