= 2001–02 UC Irvine Anteaters men's basketball team =

American college basketball season

2001–02 UC Irvine Anteaters men's basketball

Big West Regular Season co–champions

NIT First round vs. BYU, L 55–78
- Conference: Big West Conference
- Record: 21–11 (13–5 Big West)
- Head coach: Pat Douglass (5th season)
- Home arena: Bren Events Center

2001–02 Big West men's basketball standings
	Conf.				Overall
Team	W		L	PCT	W		L	PCT
Utah State	13	–	5	.722	23	–	8	.742
UC Irvine	13	–	5	.722	21	–	11	.656
UC Santa Barbara †	11	–	7	.611	20	–	11	.645
Pacific	11	–	7	.611	20	–	10	.667
Cal State Northridge	11	–	7	.611	12	–	16	.429
Cal Poly	9	–	9	.500	15	–	12	.556
Long Beach State	9	–	9	.500	13	–	17	.433
Idaho	6	–	12	.333	9	–	19	.321
UC Riverside	5	–	13	.278	8	–	18	.308
Cal State Fullerton	2	–	16	.111	5	–	22	.185
† 2002 Big West tournament winner As of April 10, 2002; Rankings from AP poll

The 2001–02 UC Irvine Anteaters men's basketball team represented the University of California, Irvine during the 2001–02 NCAA Division I men's basketball season. The Anteaters were led by 5th year head coach Pat Douglass and played at the Bren Events Center. They were members of the Big West Conference.

== Previous season ==
The 2000–01 UC Irvine Anteaters men's basketball team finished the season with a record of 25–5 and 15–1 in Big West play. The anteaters won their first regular season conference title in school history and their 25 wins were a school record.

== Roster ==
2001–02 UC Irvine Anteaters men's basketball team
Players
Coaches

Pos.	#	Name	Height	Weight	Year	Hometown
G	22	Aras Baskauskas	6 ft 4 in (1.93 m)	—	So
C	4	J.R. Christ	6 ft 9 in (2.06 m)	238 lb (108 kg)	Sr
G	5	Jerry Green	6 ft 3 in (1.91 m)	190 lb (86 kg)	Sr	Pomona, CA
F	13	Jordan Harris	6 ft 5 in (1.96 m)	—	Jr
G	20	Mike Hood	6 ft 4 in (1.93 m)	—	Jr
G	24	Jeff Hufford	6 ft 4 in (1.93 m)	—	Fr
C	50	Dave Korfman	7 ft 2 in (2.18 m)	—	Sr
G	30	Jesse Obrand	6 ft 2 in (1.88 m)	—	So
F	40	Matt Okoro	6 ft 7 in (2.01 m)	210 lb (95 kg)	So
C	55	Adam Parada	7 ft 0 in (2.13 m)	265 lb (120 kg)	So	Alta Loma, CA
F	12	Stanislav Zuzak	6 ft 11 in (2.11 m)	—	So

Head coach

Pat Douglass (Pacific)

Assistant coach(es)

Legend

- (C) Team captain
- (S) Suspended
- (I) Ineligible
- (W) Walk-on
- Injured
- Current redshirt

Roster

== Schedule ==
Date time, TV	Rank^{#}	Opponent^{#}	Result	Record	Site (attendance) city, state
Regular Season
November 16, 2001*		Saint Mary's	W 71–64	1–0	Bren Events Center (2,032); Irvine, CA
November 20, 2001*		Pepperdine	W 96–93 ^{2OT}	2–0	Bren Events Center (2,620); Irvine, CA
November 23, 2001*		vs. Illinois State; University Hoops Classic	L 52–58	2–1	Charles L. Sewall Center (1,824); Moon Township, PA
November 24, 2001*		vs. Oakland; University Hoops Classic	W 68–61	3–1	Charles L. Sewall Center (1,159); Moon Township, PA
November 28, 2001*		vs. Kent State; University Hoops Classic	L 64–75	3–2	Charles L. Sewall Center (1,214); Moon Township, PA
November 28, 2001*		at Loyola Marymount	W 71–59	4–2	Gersten Pavilion (1,967); Los Angeles, CA
December 1, 2001*		UC Davis	W 74–69	5–2	Bren Events Center (4,229); Irvine, CA
December 11, 2001*		at San Diego	L 52–63	5–3	Jenny Craig Pavilion (1,766); San Diego, CA
December 15, 2001*		at UCLA	L 74–75	5–4	Pauley Pavilion (7,397); Los Angeles, CA
December 22, 2001		Long Beach State	W 75–69	6–4 (1–0)	Bren Events Center (2,785); Irvine, CA
December 28, 2001*		vs. Lipscomb; Oneida Classic	W 79–62	7–4	Brown County Arena (1,500); Ashwaubenon, WI
December 29, 2001*		vs. Boston University; Oneida Classic	W 77–71	8–4	Brown County Arena (2,419); Ashwaubenon, WI
January 3, 2002		Cal State Fullerton	W 68–58	9–4 (2–0)	Bren Events Center (2,088); Irvine, CA
January 5, 2002		UC Riverside	W 72–53	10–4 (3–0)	Bren Events Center (3,299); Irvine, CA
January 10, 2002		at Utah State	W 67–66	11–4 (4–0)	Smith Spectrum (9,353); Logan, UT
January 12, 2002		at Idaho	W 92–54	12–4 (5–0)	Cowan Spectrum (1,322); Moscow, ID
January 17, 2002		Pacific	W 62–58	13–4 (6–0)	Bren Events Center (3,104); Irvine, CA
January 19, 2002		Cal State Northridge	L 72–73 ^{OT}	13–5 (6–1)	Bren Events Center (3,350); Irvine, CA
January 24, 2002		at UC Santa Barbara	W 81–70	14–5 (7–1)	UC Santa Barbara Events Center (4,682); Santa Barbara, CA
January 26, 2002		at Cal Poly	L 47–50	14–6 (7–2)	Mott Gym (3,032); San Luis Obispo, CA
January 31, 2002		at UC Riverside	W 72–64	15–6 (8–2)	Student Recreation Center (1,163); Riverside, CA
February 2, 2002		at Cal State Fullerton	W 72–46	16–6 (9–2)	Titan Gym (1,163); Fullerton, CA
February 7, 2002		Idaho	W 52–38	17–6 (10–2)	Bren Events Center (2,419); Irvine, CA
February 9, 2002		Utah State	L 61–62	17–7 (10–3)	Bren Events Center (5,150); Irvine, CA
February 14, 2002		at Cal State Northridge	W 82–80	18–7 (11–3)	Matadome (1,509); Northridge, CA
February 16, 2002		at Pacific	L 61–73	18–8 (11–4)	Alex G. Spanos Center (3,346); Stockton, CA
February 21, 2002		Cal Poly	W 77–63	19–8 (12–4)	Bren Events Center (2,273); Irvine, CA
February 23, 2002		UC Santa Barbara	W 71–67	20–8 (13–4)	Bren Events Center (4,664); Irvine, CA
February 28, 2002		at Long Beach State	L 70–86	20–9 (13–5)	The Pyramid (2,624); Long Beach, CA
Big West tournament
March 7, 2002		vs. Long Beach State; Quarterfinals	W 72–65	21–9	Anaheim Convention Center (3,087); Anaheim, CA
March 8, 2002		vs. UC Santa Barbara; Semifinals	L 61–66	21–10	Anaheim Convention Center (4,018); Anaheim, CA
NIT
March 14, 2002*		at BYU; First Round	L 55–78	21–11	Marriott Center (6,288); Provo, UT
*Non-conference game. ^{#}Rankings from AP Poll. (#) Tournament seedings in parentheses. All times are in Pacific Time.

== Awards and honors ==
- Jerry Green
  - Honorable Mention AP All-American
  - Big West Conference Player of the Year
  - All-Big West First Team
- Adam Parada
  - All-Big West Second Team
