= Bob Burton (basketball) =

American basketball coach

Biographical details
- Born: September 30, 1945 (age 81); Alameda County, California, U.S.

Coaching career (HC unless noted)
- 1969–1970: Cal Poly (asst.)
- 1970–1971: Leigh HS (asst.)
- 1971–1972: Westmont HS (asst.)
- 1972–1980: Willow Glen HS
- 1980–1986: West Valley CC
- 1986–1987: Utah (asst.)
- 1987–2002: West Valley CC
- 2002–2003: Fresno State (asst.)
- 2003–2012: Cal State Fullerton

Head coaching record
- Overall: 155–122
- Tournaments: 0–1 (NCAA Division I); 2–1 (NIT); 0–1 (CIT)

Accomplishments and honors

Championships
- Big West regular season (2008); Big West tournament (2008)

Robert McKay Burton, Jr. (born September 30, 1945) is an American former basketball coach. His last head coach position was for Cal State Fullerton.

== Before Fullerton ==
Bob Burton earned a bachelor's degree in social sciences from Fresno State in 1968, and a master's degree from Cal Poly in 1969.

After earning his degrees, Burton spent the next three years bouncing around, as an assistant coach at Cal Poly, Leigh High School in San Jose, and Westmont High School in Campbell. In 1972, took the head coaching job at Willow Glen High School in San Jose, compiling a 143–52 record in eight seasons there.

Burton left Willow Glen in 1980 to become head coach at West Valley College in Saratoga. Burton spent the 1986–87 season as an assistant coach on a Utah team which reached the NIT, but returned to West Valley the next year.

In all, he spent 21 years as head coach of West Valley, compiling a record of 488–158. Under Burton, West Valley reached won their conference eight times and reached the state championship three times. Burton was coach of the Year for his conference nine times, and for the entire state of California four times. He had only two losing seasons.

Burton left West Valley for good in 2002, to be an assistant coach under Ray Lopes at Fresno State. He was inducted to the California Community Colleges Coaches Hall of Fame in 2004.

== Cal State Fullerton ==
Burton was named Fullerton's head coach on June 6, 2003, replacing Donny Daniels, who left the program to become an assistant at UCLA.

The Titans struggled throughout Burton's first year as they compiled an 11–17 record, even with Pape Sow, (who would go on to the NBA) and Bobby Brown, (who would become the Titans' all-time leading scorer and would also reach the NBA) on the squad.

In the 2004–05 season, the team showed vast improvement as Burton's squad went 21–11 and reached the third round of the NIT.

The 2005–06 season, the team finished with a disappointing 16–13 record, but they rebounded in 2006–07 for a 20–10 season, marking the first time since 1985 that the Titans had three consecutive winning seasons.

Fullerton won the Big West Conference in 2008, tying Santa Barbara and Northridge at 12–4 in the regular season, while winning the conference tournament by defeating UC Irvine in the championship game. The Titans thus earned a bid to the NCAA Tournament as a 14-seed, the programs first appearance in the tournament since 1978. They were defeated by Wisconsin in the first round, 71–56.

Burton resigned on June 22, 2012, after nine seasons. His final record at Fullerton was 155–122.

== Head coaching record ==
Record table
Season	Team	Overall	Conference	Standing	Postseason
Cal State Fullerton Titans (Big West Conference) (2003–2012)
2003–04	Cal State Fullerton	11–17	7–11	T–5th	
2004–05	Cal State Fullerton	21–11	12–6	T–3rd	NIT Second Round
2005–06	Cal State Fullerton	16–13	5–9	6th	
2006–07	Cal State Fullerton	20–10	9–5	T–2nd	
2007–08	Cal State Fullerton	24–9	12–4	T–1st	NCAA Division I First Round
2008–09	Cal State Fullerton	15–17	7–9	T–7th	
2009–10	Cal State Fullerton	16–15	8–8	T–5th	
2010–11	Cal State Fullerton	11–20	7–9	T–5th	
2011–12	Cal State Fullerton	21–10	12–4	2nd	CIT First Round
Cal State Fullerton:		155–122	79–65		
Total:		155–122			
National champion Postseason invitational champion Conference regular season champion Conference regular season and conference tournament champion Division regular season champion Division regular season and conference tournament champion Conference tournament champion
