= 2009–10 UC Irvine Anteaters men's basketball team =

American college basketball season

2009–10 UC Irvine Anteaters men's basketball
- Conference: Big West Conference
- Record: 14–18 (6–10 Big West)
- Head coach: Pat Douglass (13th season)
- Home arena: Bren Events Center

2009–10 Big West men's basketball standings
	Conf.				Overall
Team	W		L	PCT	W		L	PCT
UC Santa Barbara †	12	–	4	.750	20	–	10	.667
Pacific	12	–	4	.750	23	–	12	.657
Cal State Fullerton	8	–	8	.500	16	–	15	.516
Long Beach State	8	–	8	.500	17	–	16	.515
UC Davis	8	–	8	.500	14	–	18	.438
Cal Poly	7	–	9	.438	12	–	19	.387
UC Irvine	6	–	10	.375	14	–	18	.438
Cal State Northridge	6	–	10	.375	11	–	21	.344
UC Riverside	5	–	11	.313	12	–	17	.414
† 2010 Big West tournament winner As of March 30, 2010; Rankings from AP Poll

The 2009–10 UC Irvine Anteaters men's basketball team represented the University of California, Irvine during the 2009–10 NCAA Division I men's basketball season. The Anteaters were led by 13th year head coach Pat Douglass and played at the Bren Events Center. They were members of the Big West Conference. At the end of the season, head coach Pat Douglass did not have his contract renewed.

== Previous season ==
The 2008–09 UC Irvine Anteaters men's basketball team finished the season with a record of 12–19 and 8–8 in Big West play.

=== Roster ===
2009–10 UC Irvine Anteaters men's basketball team
Players
Coaches

Pos.	#	Name	Height	Weight	Year	Hometown
C	4	Zack Atkinson	6 ft 9 in (2.06 m)	220 lb (100 kg)	Sr	Bishopville, SC
G	0	Derick Flowers	6 ft 0 in (1.83 m)	170 lb (77 kg)	Fr	Los Angeles, CA
F	20	Adam Folker	6 ft 9 in (2.06 m)	225 lb (102 kg)	So	Markham, ON (Canada)
G	5	Michael Hunter	5 ft 10 in (1.78 m)	160 lb (73 kg)	Sr	Aurora, CO
G	25	Emil Kim	6 ft 5 in (1.96 m)	205 lb (93 kg)	Jr	Santa Ana, CA
G	22	Jonas Lalenzadeh	6 ft 5 in (1.96 m)	205 lb (93 kg)	So	Irvine, CA
F	32	Pavol Losonsky	6 ft 9 in (2.06 m)	235 lb (107 kg)	Jr	Pezinok (Slovakia)
G	1	Darren Moore	6 ft 3 in (1.91 m)	190 lb (86 kg)	Jr	Chino Hills, CA
G	10	Patrick Rembert	6 ft 0 in (1.83 m)	188 lb (85 kg)	Jr	Long Beach, CA
G	11	Brandon Scott	6 ft 2 in (1.88 m)	190 lb (86 kg)	Fr	Los Altos Hills, CA
C	42	Peter Simek	6 ft 9 in (2.06 m)	240 lb (109 kg)	Jr	Bratislava(Slovakia)
G	3	Derrick Strings	6 ft 2 in (1.88 m)	180 lb (82 kg)	So	Pasadena, CA
F	2	Rashaad Ubah	6 ft 6 in (1.98 m)	210 lb (95 kg)	So	Riverside, CA
G/F	23	Michael Wilder	6 ft 2 in (1.88 m)	215 lb (98 kg)	Fr	Long Beach, CA
F	34	Eric Wise	6 ft 6 in (1.98 m)	240 lb (109 kg)	So	Riverside, CA

Head coach

Pat Douglass (Pacific)

Assistant coach(es)

Legend

- (C) Team captain
- (S) Suspended
- (I) Ineligible
- (W) Walk-on
- Injured
- Current redshirt

Roster
Last update: September 19, 2017

=== Schedule ===
Date time, TV	Rank^{#}	Opponent^{#}	Result	Record	Site (attendance) city, state
Regular Season
November 13, 2009*; 7:35 pm		La Verne	W 82–54	1–0	Bren Events Center (1,948); Irvine, CA
November 15, 2009*; 11:00 am		at Texas	L 42–89	1–1	Frank Erwin Center (11,229); Austin, TX
November 18, 2009*; 8:00 pm		at Loyola Marymount	W 84–78	2–1	Gersten Pavilion (2,445); Los Angeles, CA
November 23, 2009*; 5:00 pm		vs. UTSA; O'Reilly Auto Parts CBE Classic	L 56–66	2–2	Paul S. McBrayer Arena (200); Richmond, KY
November 24, 2009*; 3:00 pm		at Eastern Kentucky; O'Reilly Auto Parts CBE Classic	L 57–67	2–3	Paul S. McBrayer Arena (1,350); Richmond, KY
November 25, 2009*; 5:00 pm		vs. Fairleigh Dickinson; O'Reilly Auto Parts CBE Classic	W 75–54	3–3	Paul S. McBrayer Arena (225); Richmond, KY
December 2, 2009*		Hawaii	W 80–70	4–3	Bren Events Center (1,248); Irvine, CA
December 12, 2009*		Vanguard	W 81–73	5–3	Bren Events Center (791); Irvine, CA
December 15, 2009*		at Seattle	L 81–82	5–4	KeyArena (2,613); Seattle, WA
December 18, 2009*		San Jose State	L 56–69	5–5	Bren Events Center (1,107); Irvine, CA
December 21, 2009*		Pepperdine	W 74–61	6–5	Bren Events Center (1,421); Irvine, CA
December 28, 2009*		at San Jose State	L 68–78	6–6	Event Center Arena (1,358); San Jose, CA
January 2, 2010; 7:05 pm		UC Santa Barbara	W 57–55	7–6 (1–0)	Bren Events Center (1,696); Irvine, CA
January 4, 2010; 7:05 pm		Cal Poly	L 81–95	7–7 (1–1)	Bren Events Center (1,189); Irvine, CA
January 7, 2010; 7:05 pm		at Cal State Northridge	W 65–62	8–7 (2–1)	Matadome (479); Northridge, CA
January 9, 2010; 4:30 pm		at Long Beach State	L 53–55	8–8 (2–2)	Walter Pyramid (2,478); Long Beach, CA
January 14, 2010; 7:00 pm		at UC Davis	L 77–79	8–9 (2–3)	The Pavilion (UC Davis) (2,438); Davis, CA
January 16, 2010; 7:00 pm		at Pacific	L 50–61	8–10 (2–4)	Alex G. Spanos Center (3,078); Stockton, CA
January 21, 2010; 7:35 pm		Long Beach State	W 71–60	9–10 (3–4)	Bren Events Center (1,904); Irvine, CA
January 23, 2010; 8:00 pm		UC Riverside	L 56–65	9–11 (3–5)	Bren Events Center (4,107); Irvine, CA
January 28, 2010; 7:05 pm		Pacific	L 50–61	9–12 (3–6)	Bren Events Center (993); Irvine, CA
January 30, 2010; 5:05 pm		at Cal State Fullerton	L 68–74	9–13 (3–7)	Titan Gym (3,244); Fullerton, CA
February 3, 2010*; 7:00 pm		at Cal State Bakersfield	L 55–68	9–14	Rabobank Arena (2,193); Bakersfield, CA
February 6, 2010*; 7:35 pm		Cal State Bakersfield	W 76–63	10–14	Bren Events Center (1,050); Irvine, CA
February 10, 2010; 7:05 pm		Cal State Fullerton	L 61–72	10–15 (3–8)	Bren Events Center (2,155); Irvine, CA
February 13, 2010; 7:05 pm		UC Davis	W 69–67	11–15 (4–8)	Bren Events Center (1,018); Irvine, CA
February 17, 2010; 7:00 pm		at UC Riverside	L 57–74	11–16 (4–9)	Student Recreation Center (450); Riverside, CA
February 20, 2010*; 4:00 pm		Marist; ESPN BracketBusters	W 66–65	12–16	Bren Events Center (742); Irvine, CA
February 27, 2010; 7:00 pm		Cal State Northridge	W 79–74	13–16 (5–9)	Bren Events Center (2,620); Irvine, CA
March 3, 2010; 7:00 pm		at UC Santa Barbara	L 74–77	13–17 (5–10)	UC Santa Barbara Events Center (3,418); Santa Barbara, CA
March 6, 2010; 7:00 pm		at Cal Poly	W 91–84 ^{OT}	14–17 (6–10)	Mott Gym (2,876); San Luis Obispo, CA
Big West tournament
March 10, 2010; 8:45 pm	(7)	vs. (6) Cal Poly; Big West First Round	L 69–73	14–18	Anaheim Convention Center (1,833); Anaheim, CA
*Non-conference game. ^{#}Rankings from AP Poll. (#) Tournament seedings in parentheses. All times are in Pacific Time. Source

== Awards and honors ==
- Eric Wise
  - All-Big West Second Team
