= 2008 Big West Conference men's basketball tournament =

- Classification: Division I
- Season: 2007–08
- Teams: 8
- Site: Anaheim Convention Center Arena; Anaheim, California
- Champions: Cal State Fullerton (2nd title)
- Winning coach: Bob Burton (1st title)
- Television: KVMD, ESPNU, ESPN2

2007–08 Big West men's basketball standings
	Conf.				Overall
Team	W		L	PCT	W		L	PCT
UC Santa Barbara	12	–	4	.750	23	–	9	.719
Cal State Northridge	12	–	4	.750	20	–	10	.667
Cal State Fullerton†	12	–	4	.750	24	–	9	.727
Pacific	11	–	5	.688	21	–	10	.677
UC Irvine	9	–	7	.563	18	–	16	.529
Cal Poly	7	–	9	.438	12	–	18	.400
UC Riverside	4	–	12	.250	9	–	21	.300
Long Beach State	3	–	13	.188	6	–	25	.194
UC Davis	2	–	14	.125	9	–	22	.290
† 2008 Big West tournament winner As of April 10, 2008; Rankings from AP poll

The 2008 Big West Conference men's basketball tournament took place from March 12–15, 2008 at the Anaheim Convention Center Arena in Anaheim, California. The quarterfinals were televised by KVMD, the semifinals were televised by ESPNU, and the Big West Conference Championship Game was televised by ESPN2.

== Seeds ==
There was a three-way tie for first place during the regular season. UCSB received the #1 seed due to a 3–1 record against Cal State Northridge and Cal State Fullerton. Cal State Northridge received the #2 seed due to a 2–2 record against UCSB and Cal State Fullerton.

== Format ==
The top two seed receive byes into the semifinals. Seeds 3 and 4 receive byes into the quarterfinals. If necessary, the bracket will be adjusted after each round so that the top and bottom seeds in each round play in the same game. The ninth place team, UC Davis, did not receive a tournament invitation.

== Bracket ==
First round Wednesday, March 12
5	UC Irvine	77
8	Long Beach State	63
6	Cal Poly	54
7	UC Riverside	62

Quarterfinals; Thursday, March 13
1	UC Santa Barbara
–	(Bye)
4	Pacific	56
5	UC Irvine	57
2	Cal State Northridge
–	(Bye)
3	Cal State Fullerton	81
7	UC Riverside	69

Semifinals; Friday, March 14
1	UC Santa Barbara	50
5	UC Irvine	55
2	Cal State Northridge	68
3	Cal State Fullerton	83

Final; Saturday, March 15
5	UC Irvine	66
3	Cal State Fullerton	81
