= Richard Anderson (basketball) =

American basketball player

Personal information
- Born: November 19, 1960 (age 66) San Pedro, California, U.S.
- Listed height: 6 ft 10 in (2.08 m)
- Listed weight: 240 lb (109 kg)

Career information
- High school: Rancho Alamitos (Garden Grove, California)
- College: UC Santa Barbara (1978–1982)
- NBA draft: 1982: 2nd round, 32nd overall pick
- Drafted by: San Diego Clippers
- Playing career: 1982–1993
- Position: Power forward / center
- Number: 35, 40

Career history
- 1982–1983: San Diego Clippers
- 1983–1984: Denver Nuggets
- 1984–1986: Arexons Cantù
- 1986–1987: Houston Rockets
- 1987–1988: Portland Trail Blazers
- 1989–1990: Charlotte Hornets
- 1991–1993: Sioux Falls Skyforce

Career highlights
- Second-team All-Big West (1982)
- Stats at NBA.com
- Stats at Basketball Reference

Richard Andrew Anderson (born November 19, 1960) is an American former professional basketball player who played in the National Basketball Association (NBA) and other leagues. A 6'10", 240 lb (110 kg) power forward, he played college basketball for the UC Santa Barbara Gauchos from 1978 to 1982.

He was selected with the 9th pick in the second round of the 1982 NBA draft by the San Diego Clippers. His NBA career lasted until 1990; his last season being with the Charlotte Hornets. Anderson also played in Italy for Pallacanestro Cantù (1984–1986).

In the 1991 offseason he was signed by the Miami Heat, but was waived prior to the 1991–92 season.

== Career statistics ==
Legend
GP	Games played	GS	Games started	MPG	Minutes per game
FG%	Field goal percentage	3P%	3-point field goal percentage	FT%	Free throw percentage
RPG	Rebounds per game	APG	Assists per game	SPG	Steals per game
BPG	Blocks per game	PPG	Points per game	**Bold**	Career high

=== NBA ===
==== Regular season ====
Year	Team	GP	GS	MPG	FG%	3P%	FT%	RPG	APG	SPG	BPG	PPG
1982–83	San Diego	**78**	5	16.3	.404	.368	.696	3.5	1.5	.7	.3	5.2
1983–84	Denver	**78**	**17**	17.7	**.426**	.158	.773	**5.2**	**2.5**	.6	**.4**	**8.5**
1986–87	Houston	51	0	6.1	.424	.250	.759	1.5	.6	.1	.1	2.8
1987–88	Houston	12	0	4.4	.423	**.400**	.800	1.4	.3	.1	.0	2.7
1987–88	Portland	62	3	**20.9**	.387	.311	.750	4.6	1.7	**.8**	.3	6.7
1988–89	Portland	72	3	15.0	.417	.348	**.842**	3.2	1.4	.6	.2	5.2
1989–90	Charlotte	54	2	11.2	.417	.370	.783	2.4	1.0	.4	.2	4.3
Career		407	30	14.7	.412	.333	.762	3.5	1.5	.6	.2	5.6

==== Playoffs ====
Year	Team	GP	GS	MPG	FG%	3P%	FT%	RPG	APG	SPG	BPG	PPG
1984	Denver	4		9.3	.400	.000	.667	2.3	**1.3**	.0	**.3**	4.0
1987	Houston	5	0	1.0	.333	**.500**	**1.000**	.2	.0	.0	.0	1.0
1988	Portland	3	0	**21.0**	**.458**	.429	**1.000**	**4.3**	.3	**.7**	**.3**	**10.7**
1989	Portland	3	0	11.7	.333	.250	–	1.0	**1.3**	.0	**.3**	1.7
Career		15	0	9.3	.417	.381	.833	1.7	.7	.1	.2	3.9
