= 2007–08 Cal State Fullerton Titans men's basketball team =

American college basketball season

2007–08 Cal State Fullerton Titans men's basketball

Big West tournament champions Big West Regular season co-champions

NCAA tournament, first round
- Conference: Big West Conference
- Record: 24–9 (12–4 Big West)
- Head coach: Bob Burton (5th season)
- Home arena: Titan Gym (Capacity: 4,000)

2007–08 Big West men's basketball standings
| | Conf. | | | | Overall |
| Team | W | | L | PCT | W | | L | PCT |
|---|---|---|---|---|---|---|---|---|
| UC Santa Barbara | 12 | – | 4 | .750 | 23 | – | 9 | .719 |
| Cal State Northridge | 12 | – | 4 | .750 | 20 | – | 10 | .667 |
| Cal State Fullerton† | 12 | – | 4 | .750 | 24 | – | 9 | .727 |
| Pacific | 11 | – | 5 | .688 | 21 | – | 10 | .677 |
| UC Irvine | 9 | – | 7 | .563 | 18 | – | 16 | .529 |
| Cal Poly | 7 | – | 9 | .438 | 12 | – | 18 | .400 |
| UC Riverside | 4 | – | 12 | .250 | 9 | – | 21 | .300 |
| Long Beach State | 3 | – | 13 | .188 | 6 | – | 25 | .194 |
| UC Davis | 2 | – | 14 | .125 | 9 | – | 22 | .290 |
† 2008 Big West tournament winner As of April 10, 2008; Rankings from AP poll

The 2007–08 Cal State Fullerton Titans men's basketball team represented California State University, Fullerton during the 2007–08 NCAA Division I men's basketball season. The Titans, led by head coach Bob Burton, played their home games at the Titan Gym, in Fullerton, California, as members of the Big West Conference. They finished the season 24–9, 12–4 in Big West play to finish in fourth place. In the championship game of the Big West tournament, they defeated UC Irvine to win the tournament and receive the conference's automatic bid to the NCAA tournament – the school’s first appearance in 30 years. As the No. 14 seed in the Midwest region, they lost to Wisconsin in the first round.

== Roster ==
2007–08 Cal State Fullerton Titans men's basketball team
Players
Coaches

| Pos. | # | Name | Height | Weight | Year | Previous school | Hometown |
|---|---|---|---|---|---|---|---|
| G | 1 | Josh Akognon | 5 ft 11 in (1.8 m) | 185 lb (84 kg) | Jr | Washington State | Petaluma, California |
| F | 2 | Scott Cutley | 6 ft 5 in (1.96 m) | 235 lb (107 kg) | Sr | | Inglewood, California |
| G | 5 | Frank Robinson | 6 ft 4 in (1.93 m) | 220 lb (100 kg) | Sr | East Carolina | Los Angeles, California |
| G | 22 | Ray Reed | 6 ft 0 in (1.83 m) | 165 lb (75 kg) | Sr | | Hawthorne, California |
| G | 54 | Marcus Crenshaw | 5 ft 10 in (1.78 m) | 170 lb (77 kg) | Jr | | Detroit, Michigan |

Head coach

- Bob Burton (Fresno State)

Assistant coach(es)

Legend

- (C) Team captain
- (S) Suspended
- (I) Ineligible
- (W) Walk-on
- Injured
- Current redshirt

Roster

== Schedule and results ==
| Date time, TV | Rank^{#} | Opponent^{#} | Result | Record | Site (attendance) city, state |
Non-conference regular season
| Nov 9, 2007* | | Cal State Bakersfield | W 92–75 | 1–0 | Titan Gym (853); Fullerton, California |
| Nov 11, 2007* | | Cal State Los Angeles | W 87–67 | 2–0 | Titan Gym (914); Fullerton, California |
| Nov 17, 2007* | | at Southern Utah | W 78–63 | 3–0 | Centrum (3,011); Cedar City, Utah |
| Nov 28, 2007* | | at Arizona | L 65–91 | 3–1 | McKale Center (13,153); Tucson, Arizona |
| Nov 30, 2007* | | at Montana | W 100–91 | 4–1 | Dahlberg Arena (4,236); Missoula, Montana |
| Dec 8, 2007* | | at Central Michigan | L 76–79 | 4–2 | Rose Arena (2,558); Mount Pleasant, Michigan |
| Dec 17, 2007* | | Southern Utah | W 99–63 | 5–2 | Titan Gym (554); Fullerton, California |
| Dec 20, 2007* | | Montana | W 79–76 ^{OT} | 6–2 | Titan Gym (630); Fullerton, California |
| Dec 22, 2007* | | Wright State | L 80–84 | 6–3 | Titan Gym (543); Fullerton, California |
| Dec 28, 2007* | | vs. Furman | W 103–72 | 7–3 | McKeon Pavilion (2,616); Moraga, California |
| Dec 29, 2007* | | at Saint Mary's | L 59–69 | 7–4 | McKeon Pavilion (2,710); Moraga, California |
Big West regular season
| Jan 4, 2008 | | UC Irvine | W 93–83 | 8–4 (1–0) | Titan Gym (948); Fullerton, California |
| Jan 7, 2008 | | at UC Riverside | W 77–47 | 9–4 (2–0) | Student Recreation Center Arena (471); Riverside, California |
| Jan 10, 2008 | | Cal Poly | W 78–64 | 10–4 (3–0) | Titan Gym (664); Fullerton, California |
| Jan 12, 2008 | | UC Santa Barbara | L 72–87 | 10–5 (3–1) | Titan Gym (1,053); Fullerton, California |
| Jan 17, 2008 | | at Pacific | L 82–89 | 10–6 (3–2) | Alex G. Spanos Center (2,735); Stockton, California |
| Jan 19, 2008 | | at UC Davis | W 88–66 | 11–6 (4–2) | The Pavilion (1,877); Davis, California |
| Jan 23, 2008 | | UC Riverside | W 72–61 | 12–6 (5–2) | Titan Gym (730); Fullerton, California |
| Jan 31, 2008 | | at Long Beach State | W 91–75 | 13–6 (6–2) | The Walter Pyramid (1,909); Long Beach, California |
| Feb 2, 2008 | | at Cal State Northridge | W 80–72 | 14–6 (7–2) | Matadome (1,632); Northridge, California |
| Feb 7, 2008 | | at UC Santa Barbara | L 80–83 | 14–7 (7–3) | The Thunderdome (1,681); Santa Barbara, California |
| Feb 9, 2008 | | at Cal Poly | W 80–67 | 15–7 (8–3) | Robert A. Mott Athletics Center (2,517); San Luis Obispo, California |
| Feb 14, 2008 | | UC Davis | W 94–74 | 16–7 (9–3) | Titan Gym (602); Fullerton, California |
| Feb 16, 2008 | | Pacific | W 92–78 | 17–7 (10–3) | Titan Gym (1,414); Fullerton, California |
| Feb 23, 2008* | | Portland State | W 85–69 | 18–7 | Titan Gym (713); Fullerton, California |
| Feb 28, 2008 | | Cal State Northridge | L 74–82 | 18–8 (10–4) | Titan Gym (1,983); Fullerton, California |
| Mar 1, 2008 | | Long Beach State | W 85–51 | 19–8 (11–4) | Titan Gym (1,249); Fullerton, California |
| Mar 4, 2008* | | at Cal State Bakersfield | W 84–80 | 20–8 | Rabobank Arena (1,928); Bakersfield, California |
| Mar 8, 2008 | | at UC Irvine | W 74–66 | 21–8 (12–4) | Bren Events Center (2,285); Irvine, California |
Big West tournament
| Mar 13, 2008* | | vs. UC Riverside; Quarterfinals | W 81–69 | 22–8 | Anaheim Convention Center Arena (2,295); Anaheim, California |
| Mar 14, 2008* | | vs. Cal State Northridge; Semifinals | W 83–68 | 23–8 | Anaheim Convention Center Arena (3,134); Anaheim, California |
| Mar 15, 2008* | | vs. UC Irvine; Championship Game | W 81–66 | 24–8 | Anaheim Convention Center Arena (4,234); Anaheim, California |
NCAA tournament
| Mar 20, 2008* | (14 MW) | vs. (3 MW) No. 6 Wisconsin; First Round | L 56–71 | 24–9 | Qwest Center Omaha (17,162); Omaha, Nebraska |
*Non-conference game. ^{#}Rankings from AP Poll. (#) Tournament seedings in parentheses. E=East. All times are in Pacific Time.
