= 2009–10 UC Santa Barbara Gauchos men's basketball team =

American college basketball season

2009–10 UC Santa Barbara Gauchos men's basketball

Big West regular season co-champions Big West tournament champions

NCAA tournament, Round of 64
- Conference: Big West Conference
- Record: 20–10 (12–4 Big West)
- Head coach: Bob Williams
- Assistant coaches: Brad Holland; Matt Stock; Jonathan Metzger-Jones
- Home arena: The Thunderdome

2009–10 Big West men's basketball standings
	Conf.				Overall
Team	W		L	PCT	W		L	PCT
UC Santa Barbara †	12	–	4	.750	20	–	10	.667
Pacific	12	–	4	.750	23	–	12	.657
Cal State Fullerton	8	–	8	.500	16	–	15	.516
Long Beach State	8	–	8	.500	17	–	16	.515
UC Davis	8	–	8	.500	14	–	18	.438
Cal Poly	7	–	9	.438	12	–	19	.387
UC Irvine	6	–	10	.375	14	–	18	.438
Cal State Northridge	6	–	10	.375	11	–	21	.344
UC Riverside	5	–	11	.313	12	–	17	.414
† 2010 Big West tournament winner As of March 30, 2010; Rankings from AP Poll

The 2009–10 UC Santa Barbara Gauchos men's basketball team represented the University of California, Santa Barbara during the 2009–10 college basketball season. They were led by head coach Bob Williams in his 12th season at UCSB. The Gauchos were members of the Big West Conference and played their home games at the UC Santa Barbara Events Center, also known as The Thunderdome.

They finished the season 20–10, 12–4 in Big West play to win a share of the regular season championship. As the No. 1 seed in the Big West tournament, they defeated UC Davis and Long Beach State to earn the conference's automatic bid to the NCAA tournament. As a No. 15 seed in the Midwest Region, they lost in the first round to No. 2-seeded and No. 5-ranked Ohio State.

== Previous season ==
The Gauchos finished the 2008–09 season 16–15, 8–8 in Big West play to finish in a tie for fourth place. As the No. 4 seed in the Big West tournament, they beat Cal State Fullerton before losing to top-seeded Cal State Northridge.

== Roster ==
#	Name	Height	Weight (lbs.)	Position	Class	Hometown	Previous Team(s)
0	Jaimé Serna	6'7"	235	F	So.	Laguna Beach, CA	Santa Margarita HS
1	Chris Brew	6'3"	180	G	Fr.	Oakland, CA	St. Mary's HS
3	Jordan Weiner	6'0"	173	G	Jr.	Encino, CA	Birmingham HS
4	Paul Roemer	6'1"	180	G	Sr.	Martinez, CA	De La Salle HS
11	Justin Joyner	6'0"	177	G	Jr.	Antioch, CA	De La Salle HS
14	Brad Lewis	6'2"	170	G	Fr.	Simi Valley, CA	Simi Valley HS
15	Sam Phippen	6'9"	193	F	Jr.	Durango, CO	Durango HS
20	Will Brew	6'3"	175	G	So.	Oakland, CA	St. Mary's HS
21	James Nunnally	6'5"	205	F	So.	San Jose, CA	Weston Ranch HS
24	Christian Peterson	6'3"	219	G	Jr.	Carlsbad, CA	Carlsbad HS
25	Lucas Devenny	6'9"	240	F	Fr.	Santa Rosa, CA	Piner HS
32	Jon Pastorek	6'10"	210	F	Jr.	Anaheim, CA	Canyon HS; San Diego State
33	Orlando Johnson	6'5"	205	G	So.	Seaside, CA	Palma HS; Loyola Marymount
41	Seth Kamphoefner	6'9"	210	F	So.	Terra Linda, CA	Terra Linda HS
42	James Powell	6'2"	185	G	Sr.	Glendora, CA	Glendora HS
55	Greg Somogyi	7'3"	242	C	So.	Budapest, Hungary	Woodside Priory School

== Schedule and results ==
Date time, TV	Rank^{#}	Opponent^{#}	Result	Record	Site (attendance) city, state
Exhibition
11/7/2009*; 3:00pm		Sonoma State	W 101–64		The Thunderdome (1,655); Santa Barbara, CA
Regular season
11/14/2009*; 3:00pm		Cal State Los Angeles	W 85–57	1–0	The Thunderdome (1,864); Santa Barbara, CA
11/17/2009*; 7:00pm		Weber State	W 66–57	2–0	The Thunderdome (2,021); Santa Barbara, CA
11/23/2009*; 7:30pm		San Francisco	W 76–65	3–0	The Thunderdome (1,786); Santa Barbara, CA
11/28/2009*; 7:30pm		at Loyola Marymount	W 89–84	4–0	Gersten Pavilion (1,813); Los Angeles, CA
12/1/2009*; 7:00pm		Santa Clara	L 68–79	4–1	The Thunderdome (1,746); Santa Barbara, CA
12/5/2009*; 7:00pm		San Diego State	L 61–69	4–2	The Thunderdome (2,513); Santa Barbara, CA
12/18/2009*; 6:00pm		at Montana State	L 64–76	4–3	Worthington Arena (2,587); Bozeman, MT
12/21/2009*; 5:30pm		at Arizona State	L 42–69	4–4	Wells Fargo Arena (6,549); Tempe, AZ
12/28/2009*; 5:00pm		vs. Furman; Golden Bear Classic	W 72–60	5–4	Haas Pavilion; Berkeley, CA
12/29/2009*; 7:30pm, CSNC		at California; Golden Bear Classic	L 66–87	5–5	Haas Pavilion (9,052); Berkeley, CA
1/2/2010; 7:00pm		at UC Irvine	L 55–57	5–6 (0–1)	Bren Events Center (1,696); Irvine, CA
1/4/2010; 7:00pm		at UC Riverside	W 57–53	6–6 (1–1)	Student Rec Center (726); Riverside, CA
1/8/2010; 8:00pm, ESPNU		UC Davis	W 68–47	7–6 (2–1)	The Thunderdome (4,282); Santa Barbara, CA
1/10/2010; 3:00pm		Pacific	W 68–67	8–6 (3–1)	The Thunderdome (1,550); Santa Barbara, CA
1/14/2010; 7:00pm		at Long Beach State	L 47–67	8–7 (3–2)	Walter Pyramid (2,298); Long Beach, CA
1/16/2010; 7:00pm		UC Riverside	W 63–56	9–7 (4–2)	The Thunderdome (1,705); Santa Barbara, CA
1/23/2010; 7:00pm		Cal State Fullerton	W 85–80 ^{OT}	10–7 (5–2)	The Thunderdome (2,222); Santa Barbara, CA
1/28/2010; 7:00pm		Cal Poly	W 80–57	11–7 (6–2)	The Thunderdome (3,066); Santa Barbara, CA
1/30/2010; 7:00pm		at Cal State Northridge	L 69–76	11–8 (6–3)	Matadome (1,482); Northridge, CA
2/4/2010; 7:00pm		at Pacific	W 61–48	12–8 (7–3)	Alex G. Spanos Center (3,578); Stockton, CA
2/6/2010; 7:00pm		at UC Davis	W 81–77	13–8 (8–3)	The Pavilion (2,851); Davis, CA
2/13/2010; 4:00pm, FSN Prime Ticket		Long Beach State	W 64–62	14–8 (9–3)	The Thunderdome (3,228); Santa Barbara, CA
2/17/2010; 7:00pm		at Cal State Fullerton	W 73–65	15–8 (10–3)	Titan Gym (1,451); Fullerton, CA
2/20/2010*; 7:30pm		at Fresno State; ESPN BracketBusters	W 64–60	16–8	Save Mart Center (7,959); Fresno, CA
2/24/2010; 7:00pm		Cal State Northridge	W 74–69	17–8 (11–3)	The Thunderdome (2,049); Santa Barbara, CA
2/27/2010; 7:00pm		at Cal Poly	L 57–60	17–9 (11–4)	Mott Gym (3,032); San Luis Obispo, CA
3/3/2010; 7:00pm		UC Irvine	W 77–74	18–9 (12–4)	The Thunderdome (6,873); Santa Barbara, CA
Big West tournament
3/12/2010; 6:30pm, ESPNU	(1)	vs. (4) UC Davis; Semifinals	W 76–62	19–9	Anaheim Convention Center; Anaheim, CA
3/13/2010; 5:00pm, ESPN2	(1)	vs. (3) Long Beach State; Championship	W 69–64	20–9	Anaheim Convention Center (3,113); Anaheim, CA
NCAA tournament
3/19/2010*; 6:35pm, CBS	(15 MW)	vs. (2 MW) No. 5 Ohio State; First Round	L 51–68	20–10	Bradley Center (17,580); Milwaukee, WI
*Non-conference game. ^{#}Rankings from AP Poll. (#) Tournament seedings in parentheses. All times are in Pacific Time; Source.
