= 2011 Big West Conference men's basketball tournament =

- Classification: Division I
- Season: 2010–11
- Teams: 8
- Site: Honda Center; Anaheim, California
- Champions: UC Santa Barbara (3rd title)
- Winning coach: Bob Williams (3rd title)
- MVP: Orlando Johnson (UC Santa Barbara)
- Television: ESPNU/ESPN2

2010–11 Big West men's basketball standings
	Conf.				Overall
Team	W		L	PCT	W		L	PCT
Long Beach State	14	–	2	.875	22	–	12	.647
Cal Poly	10	–	6	.625	15	–	15	.500
Cal State Northridge	9	–	7	.563	14	–	18	.438
UC Santa Barbara†	8	–	8	.500	18	–	14	.563
Pacific	8	–	8	.500	16	–	15	.516
Cal State Fullerton	7	–	9	.438	11	–	20	.355
UC Irvine	6	–	10	.375	13	–	19	.406
UC Riverside	6	–	10	.375	12	–	19	.387
UC Davis	4	–	12	.250	10	–	20	.333
† 2011 Big West tournament winner As of March 15, 2012; Rankings from AP Poll

The 2011 Big West Conference men's basketball tournament took place from March 10–12, 2011 at the Honda Center in Anaheim, California. The Tournament was previously held at the Anaheim Convention Center. The winner of the tournament, UC Santa Barbara, received the conference's automatic bid to the 2011 NCAA Men's Division I Basketball Tournament, where they lost their first round to Florida.

== Format ==
The top eight teams in the conference qualified for the 2011 Big West tournament.

== Bracket ==
Quarterfinals; March 10
1	Long Beach State	79
8	UC Irvine	72
4	Pacific	67
5	UC Santa Barbara	79
(Pairings are reseeded after the first round)
3	Cal State Northridge	75
6	Cal State Fullerton	54
2	Cal Poly	66
7	UC Riverside	70*

Semifinals; March 11
1	Long Beach State	74
7	UC Riverside	63
3	Cal State Northridge	63
5	UC Santa Barbara	83

Finals; March 12
1	Long Beach State	56
5	UC Santa Barbara	64

- Asterisk (*) indicates overtime game
