= 2010–11 UC Santa Barbara Gauchos men's basketball team =

American college basketball season

2010–11 UC Santa Barbara Gauchos men's basketball

Big West tournament champions

NCAA tournament, Round of 64
- Conference: Big West Conference
- Record: 18–14 (8–8 Big West)
- Head coach: Bob Williams
- Assistant coaches: Brad Holland; Matt Stock; Jonathan Metzger-Jones
- Home arena: The Thunderdome

The 2010–11 UC Santa Barbara Gauchos men's basketball team represented the University of California, Santa Barbara during the 2010–11 college basketball season. This is head coach Bob Williams' thirteenth season at UCSB. The Gauchos compete in the Big West Conference and played their home games at the UC Santa Barbara Events Center, also known as The Thunderdome. They finished the season 18–14, 8–8 in Big West play to win the 2011 Big West Conference men's basketball tournament to earn the conference's automatic bid to the 2011 NCAA Division I men's basketball tournament where they earned a 15 seed in the Southeast Region and were defeated in the second round by 2 seed and AP #15 Florida.

== Roster ==
| # | Name | Height | Weight (lbs.) | Position | Class | Hometown | Previous Team(s) |
|---|---|---|---|---|---|---|---|
| 0 | Jaimé Serna | 6'7" | 235 | F | So. | Laguna Beach, CA | Santa Margarita HS |
| 1 | Chris Brew | 6'3" | 180 | G | Fr. | Oakland, CA | St. Mary's HS |
| 3 | Jordan Weiner | 6'0" | 173 | G | Jr. | Encino, CA | Birmingham HS |
| 4 | Paul Roemer | 6'1" | 180 | G | Sr. | Martinez, CA | De La Salle HS |
| 11 | Justin Joyner | 6'0" | 177 | G | Jr. | Antioch, CA | De La Salle HS |
| 14 | Brad Lewis | 6'2" | 170 | G | Fr. | Simi Valley, CA | Simi Valley HS |
| 15 | Sam Phippen | 6'9" | 193 | F | Jr. | Durango, CO | Durango HS |
| 20 | Will Brew | 6'3" | 175 | G | So. | Oakland, CA | St. Mary's HS |
| 21 | James Nunnally | 6'5" | 205 | F | So. | San Jose, CA | Weston Ranch HS |
| 24 | Christian Peterson | 6'3" | 219 | G | Jr. | Carlsbad, CA | Carlsbad HS |
| 25 | Lucas Devenny | 6'9" | 240 | F | Fr. | Santa Rosa, CA | Piner HS |
| 32 | Jon Pastorek | 6'10" | 210 | F | Jr. | Anaheim, CA | Canyon HS; San Diego State |
| 33 | Orlando Johnson | 6'5" | 205 | G | So. | Seaside, CA | Palma HS; Loyola Marymount |
| 41 | Seth Kamphoefner | 6'9" | 210 | F | So. | Terra Linda, CA | Terra Linda HS |
| 42 | James Powell | 6'2" | 185 | G | Sr. | Glendora, CA | Glendora HS |
| 55 | Greg Somogyi | 7'3" | 242 | C | Jr. | Budapest, Hungary | Woodside Priory School |

== Schedule and results ==
| Date time, TV | Rank^{#} | Opponent^{#} | Result | Record | Site (attendance) city, state |
Exhibition
| 11/05/2010*; 7:00pm | | at The Master's College | W 68–54 | | Bross Gym; Santa Clarita, CA |
Regular season
| 11/12/2010*; 4:30pm | | vs. Denver; BTI Invitational | W 65–49 | 1–0 | McArthur Court (6,523); Eugene, OR |
| 11/13/2010*; 6:00pm | | vs. North Dakota State; BTI Invitational | L 60–68 | 1–1 | McArthur Court (6,199); Eugene, OR |
| 11/14/2010*; 6:00pm, CSNNW | | at Oregon; BTI Invitational | L 70–72 | 1–2 | McArthur Court (6,197); Eugene, OR |
| 11/20/2010*; 7:00pm | | Fresno State | W 69–54 | 2–2 | The Thunderdome (3,577); Santa Barbara, CA |
| 11/27/2010* | | at Portland | L 67–77 | 2–3 | Chiles Center; Portland, OR |
| 12/1/2010* | | Loyola Marymount | W 77–67 | 3–3 | The Thunderdome; Santa Barbara, CA |
| 12/4/2010* | | at Santa Clara | W 80–69 | 4–3 | Leavy Center; Santa Clara, CA |
| 12/15/2010* | | at No. 22 UNLV | W 68–62 | 5–3 | Thomas & Mack Center; Las Vegas, NV |
| 12/18/2010* | | at No. 11 San Diego State | L 64–90 | 5–4 | Vejas Arena; San Diego, CA |
| 12/21/2010* | | California Baptist | W 76–52 | 6–4 | The Thunderdome; Santa Barbara, CA |
| 12/28/2010 | | Long Beach State | L 55–71 | 6–5 (0–1) | The Thunderdome; Santa Barbara, CA |
Big West tournament
| 3/10/2011 | (5) | vs. (4) Pacific; Quarterfinals | W 79–67 | 16–13 | Honda Center; Anaheim, CA |
| 3/11/2011 | (5) | vs. (3) Cal State Northridge; Semifinals | W 83–63 | 17–13 | Honda Center; Anaheim, CA |
| 03/12/2011 | (5) | vs. (1) Long Beach State; Championship | W 64–56 | 18–13 | Honda Center; Anaheim, CA |
NCAA tournament
| 3/17/2011; CBS | (15) | vs. (2) No. 15 Florida; First Round | L 51–79 | 18–14 | St. Pete Times Forum; Tampa, FL |
*Non-conference game. ^{#}Rankings from AP Poll. (#) Tournament seedings in parentheses. All times are in Pacific Time Source.
