= 2010 Big West Conference men's basketball tournament =

- Tournament Logo
- Classification: Division I
- Season: 2009–10
- Teams: 8
- Site: Anaheim Convention Center Arena; Anaheim, California
- Champions: UC Santa Barbara (2nd title)
- Winning coach: Bob Williams (2nd title)
- MVP: Orlando Johnson (UC Santa Barbara)
- Television: ESPNU/ESPN2

2009–10 Big West men's basketball standings
	Conf.				Overall
Team	W		L	PCT	W		L	PCT
UC Santa Barbara †	12	–	4	.750	20	–	10	.667
Pacific	12	–	4	.750	23	–	12	.657
Cal State Fullerton	8	–	8	.500	16	–	15	.516
Long Beach State	8	–	8	.500	17	–	16	.515
UC Davis	8	–	8	.500	14	–	18	.438
Cal Poly	7	–	9	.438	12	–	19	.387
UC Irvine	6	–	10	.375	14	–	18	.438
Cal State Northridge	6	–	10	.375	11	–	21	.344
UC Riverside	5	–	11	.313	12	–	17	.414
† 2010 Big West tournament winner As of March 30, 2010; Rankings from AP Poll

The 2010 Big West Conference men's basketball tournament took place on March 10–13, 2010 at the Anaheim Convention Center Arena in Anaheim, California. The winner of the tournament was UC Santa Barbara. The Gauchos received the conference's automatic bid to the 2010 NCAA Men's Division I Basketball Tournament.

== Format ==
The top two seed received byes into the semifinals. Seeds 3 and 4 received byes into the quarterfinals.

== Television ==
The first round and quarterfinals games were broadcast online via BigWest.TV. The semifinals were broadcast on ESPNU and the championship game was broadcast on ESPN2.

== Tournament Bracket ==
First round Wednesday, March 10
6	Cal Poly	73
7	UC Irvine	69
5	Cal State Fullerton	84
8	Cal State Northridge	76

Quarterfinals; Thursday, March 11
3	Long Beach State	79
6	Cal Poly	69
4	UC Davis	68
5	Cal State Fullerton	65

Semifinals; Friday, March 12
2	Pacific	61
3	Long Beach State	68
1	UC Santa Barbara	76
4	UC Davis	62

Finals; Saturday, March 13
3	Long Beach State	64
1	UC Santa Barbara	69
