= Pacific Tigers men's basketball statistical leaders =

The Pacific Tigers men's basketball statistical leaders are individual statistical leaders of the Pacific Tigers men's basketball program in various categories, including points, three-pointers, assists, blocks, rebounds, and steals. Within those areas, the lists identify single-game, single-season, and career leaders. The Tigers represent the University of the Pacific in the NCAA's West Coast Conference.

Pacific began competing in intercollegiate basketball in 1910. However, the school's record book does not generally list records from before the 1950s, as records from before this period are often incomplete and inconsistent. Since scoring was much lower in this era, and teams played much fewer games during a typical season, it is likely that few or no players from this era would appear on these lists anyway.

The NCAA did not officially record assists as a stat until the 1983–84 season, and blocks and steals until the 1985–86 season, but Pacific's record books includes players in these stats before these seasons. These lists are updated through the end of the 2020–21 season.

== Scoring ==
Career
Rk	Player	Points	Seasons
1	Ron Cornelius	2,065	1977–78 1978–79 1979–80 1980–81
2	Dell Demps	1,742	1988–89 1989–90 1990–91 1991–92
3	Christian Maraker	1,667	2001–02 2002–03 2003–04 2004–05 2005–06
4	John Gianelli	1,659	1968–69 1969–70 1970–71 1971–72
5	Keith Swagerty	1,650	1964–65 1965–66 1966–67
6	Adam Jacobsen	1,513	1993–94 1994–95 1995–96 1996–97 1997–98
7	Ken Stanley	1,444	1959–60 1960–61 1961–62
8	Don Lyttle	1,411	1987–88 1988–89 1989–90 1990–91
9	Bob Krulish	1,333	1964–65 1965–66 1966–67
10	Matt Waldron	1,326	1977–78 1978–79 1979–80 1980–81 1981–82

Season
Rk	Player	Points	Season
1	Michael Olowokandi	732	1997–98
2	Ron Cornelius	670	1979–80
3	Ken Stanley	624	1960–61
4	Keith Swagerty	612	1965–66
5	Ron Cornelius	603	1980–81
6	John Gianelli	600	1970–71
7	Bill Stricker	582	1969–70
8	Dell Demps	569	1991–92
9	Christian Maraker	564	2005–06
	Dave Klurman	564	1958–59

Single game
Rk	Player	Points	Season	Opponent
1	Bill Stricker	44	1968–69	Portland
2	Rich Anema	42	1985–86	Cal State Fullerton
	Bill Stricker	42	1969–70	UNLV
	Dave Davis	42	1955–56	Fresno State
	Don Brownfield	42	1955–56	Pepperdine
6	Roberto Gallinat	41	2017–18	San Francisco
7	Lamar Washington	40	2024–25	Washington State
8	Jahlil Tripp	39	2019–20	Saint Mary's
	Matt Waldron	39	1981–82	Cal State Fullerton
	Bill Stricker	39	1968–69	Hayward State
	Keith Swagerty	39	1965–66	San Jose State

== Rebounds ==
Career
Rk	Player	Rebounds	Seasons
1	Keith Swagerty	1,505	1964–65 1965–66 1966–67
2	Leroy Wright	1,442	1957–58 1958–59 1959–60
3	John Gianelli	1,339	1968–69 1969–70 1970–71 1971–72
4	Ron Cornelius	973	1977–78 1978–79 1979–80 1980–81
5	Jim McCargo	934	1970–71 1971–72 1972–73
6	Sam Willard	874	2007–08 2008–09 2009–10 2010–11
7	Leo Middleton	844	1962–63 1963–64
8	Christian Maraker	822	2001–02 2002–03 2003–04 2004–05 2005–06
9	John Thomas	809	1955–56 1956–57
10	Don Lyttle	796	1987–88 1988–89 1989–90 1990–91

Season
Rk	Player	Rebounds	Season
1	Leroy Wright	652	1958–59
2	Keith Swagerty	518	1966–67
3	Keith Swagerty	514	1965–66
4	John Gianelli	509	1970–71
5	Keith Swagerty	473	1964–65
6	John Gianelli	466	1971–72
7	Leroy Wright	410	1957–58
8	Leroy Wright	380	1959–60
9	Michael Olowokandi	369	1997–98
10	Larkin Bryant	368	1958–59

Single game
Rk	Player	Rebounds	Season	Opponent
1	Keith Swagerty	39	1964–65	UC Santa Barbara
2	John Gianelli	32	1970–71	Nevada
	Keith Swagerty	32	1966–67	Loyola
4	Leroy Wright	31	1959–60	Chico State
	Leroy Wright	31	1958–59	Canisius
6	John Gianelli	30	1970–71	San Diego State
	John Gianelli	30	1969–70	Hayward State
	Keith Swagerty	30	1966–67	UC Santa Barbara
	Keith Swagerty	30	1966–67	Missouri
	Leroy Wright	30	1958–59	Saint Mary's

== Assists ==
Career
Rk	Player	Assists	Seasons
1	Adam Jacobsen	436	1993–94 1994–95 1995–96 1996–97 1997–98
2	Kyle Pepple	403	1983–84 1984–85 1985–86 1986–87
3	John Errecart	365	1971–72 1972–73 1973–74
4	Dell Demps	350	1988–89 1989–90 1990–91 1991–92
5	John Leidenheimer	343	1980–81 1981–82 1982–83 1983–84
6	Steffan Johnson	337	2005–06 2006–07 2007–08
	Terence Carney	337	1975–76 1976–77 1977–78 1978–79
8	Leonard Armato	326	1973–74 1974–75
9	Pierre Cockrell II	311	2019–20 2020–21 2021–22
10	Jahlil Tripp	308	2017–18 2018–19 2019–20

Season
Rk	Player	Assists	Season
1	Jaden Clayton	210	2025–26
2	Lamar Washington	191	2024–25
3	Leonard Armato	178	1973–74
4	Adam Jacobsen	154	1997–98
5	Steffan Johnson	151	2007–08
6	Leonard Armato	148	1974–75
7	Moe Odum	146	2023–24
8	Jahlil Tripp	145	2017–18
9	Anthony Woods	144	1990–91
10	Kyle Pepple	143	1984–85

Single game
Rk	Player	Assists	Season	Opponent
1	Lamar Washington	15	2024–25	Jessup University
2	Dell Demps	14	1990–91	UC Irvine
3	Leonard Armato	13	1974–75	Santa Clara
	Kajus Kublickas	13	2025–26	Simpson (CA)
5	Lamar Washington	12	2024–25	Portland
	Jahlil Tripp	12	2017–18	Loyola Marymount
	John Phillips	12	1968–69	Pepperdine
	Leonard Armato	12	1973–74	Texas Christian
	John Leidenheimer	12	1981–82	Utah State
	Kyle Pepple	12	1983–84	Long Beach State
	Adam Jacobsen	12	1994–95	Cleveland State
	Steffan Johnson	12	2007–08	Western Michigan
	Jaden Clayton	12	2025–26	Portland

== Steals ==
Career
Rk	Player	Steals	Seasons
1	Corey Anders	191	1994–95 1995–96 1996–97 1997–98
2	Adam Jacobsen	160	1993–94 1994–95 1995–96 1996–97 1997–98
3	Jahlil Tripp	148	2017–18 2018–19 2019–20
4	Joe Ford	125	2005–06 2006–07 2007–08 2008–09 2009–10
5	T.J. Wallace	106	2013–14 2014–15 2015–16 2016–17
6	Steffan Johnson	104	2005–06 2006–07 2007–08
7	Jeremiah Bailey	100	2018–19 2019–20 2020–21 2021–22
8	Brent Counts	98	1983–84 1984–85 1985–86 1986–87
9	Jasko Korajkic	88	2001–02 2002–03 2003–04 2004–05
10	Kyle Pepple	85	1983–84 1984–85 1985–86 1986–87

Season
Rk	Player	Steals	Season
1	Corey Anders	82	1996–97
2	Russ Coleman	65	1977–78
3	Lamar Washington	55	2024–25
4	Adam Jacobsen	52	1994–95
5	Jahlil Tripp	51	2018–19
6	Jahlil Tripp	49	2019–20
7	Jahlil Tripp	48	2017–18
8	Anthony Woods	47	1990–91
	Tony Amundsen	47	1992–93
10	Steffan Johnson	45	2007–08
	Adam Jacobsen	45	1995–96

Single game
Rk	Player	Steals	Season	Opponent
1	Tony Amundsen	8	1992–93	Utah State
	Russ Coleman	8	1977–78	UC Davis
3	Jefferson Koulibaly	6	2024–25	Washington State
	Tyler Beard	6	2022–23	North Dakota State
	Steffan Johnson	6	2007–08	Saint Louis
	Corey Anders	6	1997–98	New Mexico State
	Corey Anders	6	1996–97	UC Santa Barbara
	Tony Amundsen	6	1992–93	Nevada
	Walsh Jordan	6	1990–91	Utah State
	Ron Cornelius	6	1978–79	Nebraska-Omaha
	Russ Coleman	6	1977–78	Cal State Fullerton

== Blocks ==
Career
Rk	Player	Blocks	Seasons
1	Michael Olowokandi	160	1995–96 1996–97 1997–98
2	Don Lyttle	124	1987–88 1988–89 1989–90 1990–91
3	Vic Trierweiler	122	1993–94 1994–95 1995–96 1996–97
4	George Fowler	101	1975–76 1976–77 1977–78
5	Tim Johnson	90	1998–99 2000–01 2001–02 2002–03
6	Namdi Okonkwo	80	2017–18
	Glenn Griffin	80	1990–91 1991–92 1992–93 1993–94
8	Elias Ralph	70	2024–25 2025–26
9	Guillaume Yango	67	2003–04 2004–05
10	Christian Maraker	65	2001–02 2002–03 2003–04 2004–05 2005–06

Season
Rk	Player	Blocks	Season
1	Michael Olowokandi	95	1997–98
2	Namdi Okonkwo	80	2017–18
3	George Fowler	74	1977–78
4	Vic Trierweiler	51	1994–95
5	James Hampshire	43	2019–20
6	Don Lyttle	38	1988–89
	Don Lyttle	38	1990–91
	Elias Ralph	38	2024–25
9	Vic Trierweiler	37	1995–96
10	Guillaume Yango	35	2003–04

Single game
Rk	Player	Blocks	Season	Opponent
1	Lee Smith	11	1979–80	UC Davis
2	Namdi Okonkwo	7	2017–18	San Francisco
	Michael Olowokandi	7	1997–98	UC Irvine
	Michael Olowokandi	7	1997–98	UC Santa Barbara
5	Namdi Okonkwo	6	2017–18	Pepperdine
	Nyika Williams	6	2010–11	Cal State Fullerton
	Michael Olowokandi	6	1997–98	Nevada
	Vic Trierweiler	6	1994–95	Utah State
	Don Lyttle	6	1988–89	Fresno State
	Vic Trierweiler	6	1995–96	UC Santa Barbara
