= 1998–99 Idaho Vandals men's basketball team =

American college basketball season

1998–99 Idaho Vandals men's basketball
- Conference: Big West Conference
- Record: 16–11 (11–5 Big West)
- Head coach: David Farrar (2nd season)
- Home arena: Kibbie Dome

1998–99 Big West men's basketball standings
	Conf.				Overall
Team	W		L	PCT	W		L	PCT
East Division
Boise State	12	–	4	.750	21	–	8	.724
New Mexico State †	12	–	4	.750	23	–	10	.697
Idaho	11	–	5	.688	16	–	11	.593
Utah State	8	–	8	.500	15	–	13	.536
Nevada	4	–	12	.250	8	–	18	.308
North Texas	4	–	12	.250	4	–	22	.154
West Division
UC Santa Barbara	12	–	4	.750	15	–	13	.536
Long Beach State	9	–	7	.563	13	–	15	.464
Pacific	9	–	7	.563	14	–	13	.519
Cal State Fullerton	7	–	9	.438	13	–	14	.481
Cal Poly	6	–	10	.375	11	–	16	.407
UC Irvine	2	–	14	.125	6	–	20	.231
† 1999 Big West tournament winner As of April 10, 1999; Rankings from AP poll

The 1998–99 Idaho Vandals men's basketball team represented the University of Idaho during the 1998–99 NCAA Division I men's basketball season. Members of the Big West Conference, the Vandals were led by second-year head coach David Farrar and played their home games on campus at the Kibbie Dome in Moscow, Idaho.

The Vandals were 16–10 overall in the regular season and 11–5 in conference play, third in the East division standings. In the regular season finale, Idaho defeated rival Boise State before 7,323 at the Kibbie Dome, the largest home attendance in a decade.

They met Long Beach State in the first round of the conference tournament and lost by five points.

== Postseason result ==
Date time, TV	Rank^{#}	Opponent^{#}	Result	Record	Site (attendance) city, state
Big West tournament
Thu, March 4; 8:30 pm	(E3)	vs. (W2) Long Beach State; Quarterfinal	L 76–81	16–11	Lawlor Events Center (2,423); Reno, Nevada
*Non-conference game. (#) Tournament seedings in parentheses. All times are in Pacific time.
