= 1996–97 Idaho Vandals men's basketball team =

Season of the Idaho Vandals men's basketball team

1996–97 Idaho Vandals men's basketball
- Conference: Big West Conference
- Record: 13–17 (5–11 Big West)
- Head coach: Kermit Davis (3rd season)
- Assistant coach: David Farrar
- Home arena: Kibbie Dome

1996–97 Big West men's basketball standings
| | Conf. | | | | Overall |
| Team | W | | L | PCT | W | | L | PCT |
|---|---|---|---|---|---|---|---|---|
East Division
| Utah State | 12 | – | 4 | .750 | 20 | – | 9 | .690 |
| New Mexico State | 12 | – | 4 | .750 | 19 | – | 9 | .679 |
| Nevada | 12 | – | 4 | .750 | 21 | – | 10 | .677 |
| Boise State | 9 | – | 7 | .563 | 14 | – | 13 | .519 |
| Idaho | 5 | – | 11 | .313 | 13 | – | 17 | .433 |
| North Texas | 5 | – | 11 | .313 | 10 | – | 16 | .385 |
West Division
| Pacific † | 12 | – | 4 | .750 | 24 | – | 6 | .800 |
| Long Beach State | 9 | – | 7 | .563 | 13 | – | 14 | .481 |
| UC Santa Barbara | 7 | – | 9 | .438 | 12 | – | 15 | .444 |
| Cal State Fullerton | 6 | – | 10 | .375 | 13 | – | 14 | .481 |
| Cal Poly | 6 | – | 10 | .375 | 14 | – | 16 | .467 |
| UC Irvine | 1 | – | 15 | .063 | 1 | – | 25 | .038 |
† 1997 Big West tournament winner As of April 1, 1997; Rankings from AP poll

The 1996–97 Idaho Vandals men's basketball team represented the University of Idaho during the 1996–97 NCAA Division I men's basketball season. New members of the Big West Conference, the Vandals were led by first-year head coach Kermit Davis (third overall) and played their home games on campus at the Kibbie Dome in Moscow, Idaho.

The Vandals were 13–17 in the regular season and 5–9 in conference play, fifth in the East division standings, but failed to qualify for the Big West tournament. It was the first time Idaho had missed the postseason in eighteen years.

An assistant at Idaho for two seasons under Tim Floyd, Davis was promoted to head coach in April 1988. After consecutive conference titles and NCAA appearances, he left in March 1990 for Texas A&M, but lasted only one season there.

Davis left Idaho again in April 1997 to become associate head coach at LSU in the Southeastern Conference under new head coach John Brady; Vandals' assistant David Farrar was soon promoted to head coach.
