= Pat Douglass =

American basketball player and coach

Biographical details
- Born: January 23, 1950 (age 76); Knoxville, Tennessee, U.S.

Playing career
- 1969–1972: Pacific

Coaching career (HC unless noted)
- 1973–1975: Dixon HS
- 1975–1979: Manteca HS
- 1979–1981: Columbia JC
- 1981–1987: Eastern Montana
- 1987–1997: Cal State Bakersfield
- 1997–2010: UC Irvine

Accomplishments and honors

Championships
- 3× NCAA Men's Division II champion (1993, 1994, 1997)

Joseph Patrick Douglass (born January 23, 1950) is a retired American basketball coach. He was most recently the men's head coach at UC Irvine from 1997 to 2010.

== Early life and education ==
Born in Knoxville, Tennessee, Douglass moved to Barstow, California as a teenager and graduated from Kennedy High School. He graduated from the University of the Pacific in 1972 with a bachelor's degree in biology and teaching credential in physical education.

== Coaching career ==
Douglass climbed the coaching ladder, first at the high school level as head coach at Dixon High School from 1973 to 1975, then Manteca High School from 1975 to 1979. He stepped up to the junior college ranks, guiding Columbia Junior College from 1979 to 1981.

Douglass spent six seasons at Eastern Montana (now known as MSU-Billings), with an overall record of 119–57.

In his 10 seasons at Cal State Bakersfield, Douglass compiled a 257–61 record, won three Division II national championships, and reached the Elite Eight seven times.

== Head coaching record ==
Record table
Season	Team	Overall	Conference	Standing	Postseason
Eastern Montana Yellowjackets (NCAA Division II independent) (1981–1982)
1981–82	Eastern Montana	19–10			NCAA D-II Regional Fourth Place
Eastern Montana Yellowjackets (Great Northwest Conference) (1982–1987)
1982–83	Eastern Montana	15–12	4–6	3rd	
1983–84	Eastern Montana	16–14	4–6	3rd	
1984–85	Eastern Montana	23–7	7–1	1st	NCAA D-II Regional Fourth Place
1985–86	Eastern Montana	22–8	6–2	2nd	NCAA D-II Regional Third Place
1986–87	Eastern Montana	24–7	9–1	1st	NCAA D-II Final Four
Eastern Montana:		119–58	30–16		
Cal State Bakersfield Roadrunners (California Collegiate Athletic Association) (1987–1997)
1987–88	Cal State Bakersfield	21–10	10–4	T–1st	NCAA D-II Regional Third Place
1988–89	Cal State Bakersfield	21–9	9–5	3rd	NCAA D-II Regional Final
1989–90	Cal State Bakersfield	29–5	11–3	1st	NCAA D-II Runners-up
1990–91	Cal State Bakersfield	25–8	9–3	T–1st	NCAA D-II Final Four
1991–92	Cal State Bakersfield	26–7	10–4	2nd	NCAA D-II Final Four
1992–93	Cal State Bakersfield	33–0	14–0	1st	NCAA D-II Champions
1993–94	Cal State Bakersfield	27–6	9–3	2nd	NCAA D-II Champions
1994–95	Cal State Bakersfield	20–8	7–5	3rd	NCAA D-II First Round
1995–96	Cal State Bakersfield	26–4	10–2	1st	NCAA D-II Elite Eight
1996–97	Cal State Bakersfield	29–4	11–1	1st	NCAA D-II Champions
Cal State Bakersfield:		257–61	91–30		
UC Irvine Anteaters (Big West Conference) (1997–2010)
1997–98	UC Irvine	9–18	6–10	T–3rd (West)	
1998–99	UC Irvine	6–20	2–14	6th (West)	
1999–00	UC Irvine	14–14	7–9	3rd (West)	
2000–01	UC Irvine	25–5	15–1	1st	NIT First Round
2001–02	UC Irvine	21–11	13–5	T–1st	NIT First Round
2002–03	UC Irvine	20–9	13–5	2nd	
2003–04	UC Irvine	11–17	6–12	T–8th	
2004–05	UC Irvine	16–13	8–10	5th	
2005–06	UC Irvine	16–13	10–4	2nd	
2006–07	UC Irvine	15–18	6–8	5th	
2007–08	UC Irvine	18–16	9–7	5th	
2008–09	UC Irvine	12–19	8–8	T–4th	
2009–10	UC Irvine	14–18	6–10	T–7th	
UC Irvine:		197–191	109–103		
Total:		573–310			
National champion Postseason invitational champion Conference regular season champion Conference regular season and conference tournament champion Division regular season champion Division regular season and conference tournament champion Conference tournament champion
