= 2003–04 Pacific Tigers men's basketball team =

American college basketball season

2003–04 Pacific Tigers men's basketball

Big West regular season co-champions Big West tournament champions

NCAA tournament, second round
- Conference: Big West Conference
- Record: 25–8 (17–1 Big West)
- Head coach: Bob Thomason (16th season)
- Home arena: Alex G. Spanos Center

2003–04 Big West men's basketball standings
	Conf.				Overall
Team	W		L	PCT	W		L	PCT
No. 25 Utah State	17	–	1	.944	25	–	4	.862
Pacific †	17	–	1	.944	25	–	8	.758
UC Santa Barbara	10	–	8	.556	16	–	12	.571
Idaho	9	–	9	.500	14	–	16	.467
UC Riverside	7	–	11	.389	11	–	17	.393
Cal State Northridge	7	–	11	.389	14	–	16	.467
Cal State Fullerton	7	–	11	.389	11	–	17	.393
Cal Poly	6	–	12	.333	11	–	16	.407
UC Irvine	6	–	12	.333	11	–	17	.393
Long Beach State	4	–	14	.222	6	–	21	.222
† 2004 Big West tournament winner As of April 10, 2004; Rankings from AP poll

The 2003–04 Pacific Tigers men's basketball team represented the University of the Pacific during the 2003–04 NCAA Division I men's basketball season. The Tigers were led by 16th-year head coach Bob Thomason and played their home games at the Alex G. Spanos Center in Stockton, California as members of the Big West Conference. Pacific finished tied with Utah State atop the Big West regular season standings and followed by winning the Big West tournament to receive an automatic bid to the NCAA tournament. Playing as the No. 12 seed in the St. Louis region, the team upset No. 5 seed Providence in the opening round. Playing in the Round of 32 for the first time in school history, the Tigers were beaten by No. 4 seed Kansas to end their season at 25–8 (17–1 Big West).

== Roster ==
2003–04 Pacific Tigers men's basketball team
Players
Coaches

Pos.	#	Name	Height	Weight	Year	Hometown
G	11	Miah Davis	6 ft 1 in (1.85 m)	180 lb (82 kg)	Sr
C	33	Guillaume Yango	6 ft 9 in (2.06 m)	240 lb (109 kg)	Jr

Head coach

- Bob Thomason (Pacific)

Assistant coach(es)

Legend

- (C) Team captain
- (S) Suspended
- (I) Ineligible
- (W) Walk-on
- Injured
- Current redshirt

Roster

== Schedule and results ==
Date time, TV	Rank^{#}	Opponent^{#}	Result	Record	Site (attendance) city, state
Regular season
Nov 21, 2003*		San Jose State	W 76–65 ^{OT}	1–0	Alex G. Spanos Center; Stockton, California
Nov 27, 2003*		vs. No. 2 Duke; Great Alaska Shootout	L 69–82	1–1	Sullivan Arena; Anchorage, Alaska
Nov 28, 2003*		vs. Canisius; Great Alaska Shootout	L 59–62	1–2	Sullivan Arena; Anchorage, Alaska
Nov 29, 2003*		vs. Texas State; Great Alaska Shootout	W 62–55	2–2	Sullivan Arena; Anchorage, Alaska
Dec 6, 2003*		Nevada	W 82–76	3–2	Alex G. Spanos Center; Stockton, California
Dec 10, 2003*		Fresno State	L 51–66	3–3	Alex G. Spanos Center; Stockton, California
Dec 13, 2003*		at Santa Clara	L 61–72	3–4	Leavey Center; Santa Clara, California
Dec 20, 2003*		at Lamar	W 73–71	4–4	Montagne Center; Beaumont, Texas
Dec 23, 2003*		at San Francisco	L 72–73	4–5	War Memorial Gymnasium; San Francisco, California
Dec 27, 2003*		at No. 10 Saint Joseph's	L 55–73	4–6	Hagan Arena; Philadelphia, Pennsylvania
Dec 30, 2003*		Cal State Stanislaus	W 68–47	5–6	Alex G. Spanos Center; Stockton, California
Jan 3, 2004		at UC Riverside	W 73–59	6–6 (1–0)	UCR Student Rec Center; Riverside, California
Jan 5, 2004		at Cal State Fullerton	W 66–64 ^{OT}	7–6 (2–0)	Titan Gym; Fullerton, California
Jan 8, 2004		Long Beach State	W 70–55	8–6 (3–0)	Alex G. Spanos Center; Stockton, California
Jan 10, 2004		UC Irvine	W 67–52	9–6 (4–0)	Alex G. Spanos Center; Stockton, California
Jan 15, 2004		at Utah State	L 51–66	9–7 (4–1)	Dee Glen Smith Spectrum; Logan, Utah
Jan 17, 2004		at Idaho	W 63–62	10–7 (5–1)	Cowan Spectrum; Moscow, Idaho
Jan 22, 2004		Cal Poly	W 88–64	11–7 (6–1)	Alex G. Spanos Center; Stockton, California
Jan 24, 2004		UC Santa Barbara	W 76–56	12–7 (7–1)	Alex G. Spanos Center; Stockton, California
Jan 31, 2004		at Cal State Northridge	W 86–78	13–7 (8–1)	Matadome; Northridge, California
Feb 5, 2004		at UC Irvine	W 64–52	14–7 (9–1)	Bren Events Center; Irvine, California
Feb 7, 2004		at Long Beach State	W 67–58	15–7 (10–1)	The Walter Pyramid; Long Beach, California
Big West tournament
Mar 12, 2004*		vs. Idaho; Semifinals	W 67–61	23–7	Arrowhead Pond of Anaheim; Anaheim, California
Mar 13, 2004*		vs. Cal State Northridge; Championship game	W 75–73	24–7	Arrowhead Pond of Anaheim; Anaheim, California
NCAA tournament
Mar 19, 2004*	(12 STL)	vs. (5 STL) No. 21 Providence; First Round	W 66–58	25–7	Kemper Arena (17,500); Kansas City, Missouri
Mar 21, 2004*	(12 STL)	vs. (4 STL) No. 16 Kansas; Second Round	L 63–78	25–8	Kemper Arena (17,667); Kansas City, Missouri
*Non-conference game. ^{#}Rankings from AP Poll. (#) Tournament seedings in parentheses. STL=St. Louis. All times are in Pacific Time.
