= 1998–99 UC Irvine Anteaters men's basketball team =

American college basketball season

1998–99 UC Irvine Anteaters men's basketball
- Conference: Big West Conference
- Record: 6–20 (2–14 Big West)
- Head coach: Pat Douglass (2nd season)
- Home arena: Bren Events Center

1998–99 Big West men's basketball standings
	Conf.				Overall
Team	W		L	PCT	W		L	PCT
East Division
Boise State	12	–	4	.750	21	–	8	.724
New Mexico State †	12	–	4	.750	23	–	10	.697
Idaho	11	–	5	.688	16	–	11	.593
Utah State	8	–	8	.500	15	–	13	.536
Nevada	4	–	12	.250	8	–	18	.308
North Texas	4	–	12	.250	4	–	22	.154
West Division
UC Santa Barbara	12	–	4	.750	15	–	13	.536
Long Beach State	9	–	7	.563	13	–	15	.464
Pacific	9	–	7	.563	14	–	13	.519
Cal State Fullerton	7	–	9	.438	13	–	14	.481
Cal Poly	6	–	10	.375	11	–	16	.407
UC Irvine	2	–	14	.125	6	–	20	.231
† 1999 Big West tournament winner As of April 10, 1999; Rankings from AP poll

The 1998–99 UC Irvine Anteaters men's basketball team is a team that represented the University of California, Irvine during the 1998–99 NCAA Division I men's basketball season. It was led by 2nd-year head coach Pat Douglass, the Anteaters played at the Bren Events Center. At the time, the team was part of the Big West Conference.

== Previous season ==
In head coach Pat Douglass' first year, the 1997–98 UC Irvine Anteaters men's basketball team finished the season with a record of 9–18; 6–10 in Big West play.

== Roster ==
1998–99 UC Irvine Anteaters men's basketball team
Players
Coaches

Pos.	#	Name	Height	Weight	Year	Hometown
G	14	Zamiro Bennem	6 ft 3 in (1.91 m)	195 lb (88 kg)	Fr
G		Gabe Cagwin	5 ft 10 in (1.78 m)	—	Fr
C		Stan Divranos	6 ft 8 in (2.03 m)	—	So
G	11	Malachi Edmond	6 ft 1 in (1.85 m)	185 lb (84 kg)	So
G		JaSon Flowers	6 ft 1 in (1.85 m)	—	So
C	52	Mark Gottschalk	6 ft 10 in (2.08 m)	255 lb (116 kg)	Fr
G	5	Jerry Green	6 ft 3 in (1.91 m)	190 lb (86 kg)	Fr	Pomona, CA
F		Ben Jones	6 ft 7 in (2.01 m)	—	So
G	4	Andrew Navar	6 ft 3 in (1.91 m)	—	Sr
F	21	Marek Ondera	6 ft 6 in (1.98 m)	220 lb (100 kg)	Jr
G		Brian Scoggin	6 ft 2 in (1.88 m)	—	Sr
F	42	Adam Stetson	6 ft 7 in (2.01 m)	230 lb (104 kg)	Jr
F		Matt Willard	6 ft 9 in (2.06 m)	—	Sr

Head coach

Pat Douglass (Pacific)

Assistant coach(es)

Legend

- (C) Team captain
- (S) Suspended
- (I) Ineligible
- (W) Walk-on
- Injured
- Current redshirt

Roster

Team Leaders:

Scoring: Jerry Green - 12.9 per game

Redounding: Marek Ondera - 7.0 per game

Assists: Jerry Green - 3.8 per game

Steals: Jerry Green - 1.5 per game

== Schedule ==
Date time, TV	Rank^{#}	Opponent^{#}	Result	Record	Site (attendance) city, state
Non-Conference Season
November 17, 1998*		at Pepperdine	L 58–71	0–1	Firestone Fieldhouse (1,237); Malibu, CA
November 24, 1998*		at Cal State Stanislaus	W 63–52	1–1	Bren Events Center (1,402); Irvine, CA
November 28, 1998*		at Oregon State	L 70–80	1–2	Gill Coliseum (4,065); Corvallis, OR
November 30, 1998*		at Portland	L 54–68	1–3	Chiles Center (933); Portland, OR
December 5, 1998*		Northern Arizona	W 68–54	2–3	Bren Events Center (1,602); Irvine, CA
December 14, 1998*		at No. 8 Arizona	L 70–93	2–4	McKale Center (14,281); Tucson, AZ
December 20, 1998*		James Madison	L 57–71	2–5	Bren Events Center (1,006); Irvine, CA
December 22, 1998*		BYU	W 82–75	3–5	Bren Events Center (1,763); Irvine, CA
December 28, 1998*		Southern Oregon	W 75–52	4–5	Bren Events Center (973); Irvine, CA
January 2, 1999*		at San Diego	L 64–76	4–6	USD Sports Center (1,277); San Diego, CA
Conference Season
January 7, 1999		North Texas	W 71–59	5–6 (1–0)	Bren Events Center (1,278); Irvine, CA
January 9, 1999		New Mexico State	L 56–60	5–7 (1–1)	Bren Events Center (2,071); Irvine, CA
January 14, 1999		at Boise State	L 61–73	5–8 (1–2)	BSU Arena (6,442); Boise, ID
January 16, 1999		at Idaho	L 62–67	5–9 (1–3)	Cowan Spectrum (3,795); Moscow, ID
January 21, 1999		Pacific	L 55–64	5–10 (1–4)	Bren Events Center (1,678); Irvine, CA
January 23, 1999		Long Beach State	L 63–64	5–11 (1–5)	Bren Events Center (3,742); Irvine, CA
January 28, 1999		at Cal Poly	L 71–73	5–12 (1–6)	Mott Gym (2,687); San Luis Obispo, CA
January 30, 1999		at UC Santa Barbara	L 61–76	5–13 (1–7)	UC Santa Barbara Events Center (2,003); Santa Barbara, CA
February 4, 1999		Nevada	L 67–70	5–14 (1–8)	Bren Events Center (1,202); Irvine, CA
February 6, 1999		Cal State Fullerton	L 47–64	5–15 (1–9)	Bren Events Center (2,957); Irvine, CA
February 11, 1999		at Utah State	L 46–76	5–16 (1–10)	Smith Spectrum (6,688); Logan, UT
February 13, 1999		at Cal State Fullerton	L 97–104	5–17 (1–11)	Titan Gym (815); Fullerton, CA
February 18, 1999		at Long Beach State	L 63–66	5–18 (1–12)	The Pyramid (2,701); Long Beach, CA
February 20, 1999		at Pacific	L 51–61	5–19 (1–13)	Alex G. Spanos Center (4,811); Stockton, CA
February 25, 1999		UC Santa Barbara	L 68–79	5–20 (1–14)	Bren Events Center (1,460); Irvine, CA
February 28, 1999		Cal Poly	W 92–73	6–20 (2–14)	Bren Events Center (1,818); Irvine, CA
*Non-conference game. ^{#}Rankings from AP Poll. (#) Tournament seedings in parentheses. All times are in Pacific Time.

== Awards and honors ==
- Jerry Green
  - Big West Freshman of the Year
  - Big West All-Freshman Team
