= 2005–06 Pacific Tigers men's basketball team =

American college basketball season

2005–06 Pacific Tigers men's basketball

Big West regular season and tournament champions

NCAA tournament, First round
- Conference: Big West Conference
- Record: 24–8 (12–2 Big West)
- Head coach: Bob Thomason (18th season)
- Home arena: Alex G. Spanos Center

2005–06 Big West men's basketball standings
	Conf.				Overall
Team	W		L	PCT	W		L	PCT
Pacific †	12	–	2	.857	24	–	8	.750
UC Irvine	10	–	4	.714	16	–	13	.552
Cal Poly	7	–	7	.500	10	–	19	.345
UC Santa Barbara	6	–	8	.429	15	–	14	.517
Cal State Fullerton	5	–	9	.357	16	–	13	.552
Cal State Northridge	4	–	10	.286	11	–	17	.393
UC Riverside	3	–	11	.214	5	–	23	.179
*Long Beach State	0	–	5	.000	0	–	12	.000
† 2006 Big West tournament winner As of April 10, 2006; *Long Beach State: 18 wins vacated due to sanctions against the program; Disputed record: Long Beach State–(18–12)(9–5); Rankings from AP poll

The 2005–06 Pacific Tigers men's basketball team represented the University of the Pacific during the 2005–06 NCAA Division I men's basketball season. The Tigers were led by 18th-year head coach Bob Thomason and played their home games at the Alex G. Spanos Center in Stockton, California as members of the Big West Conference. Pacific won the Big West regular season, finishing with a 12–2 record in conference play. The Tigers lost to Utah State in the championship game of the Big West tournament, but did receive an at-large bid to the NCAA tournament. Playing as the No. 13 seed in the Minneapolis region, the team was beaten by No. 4 seed Boston College to end their season at 24–8 (12–2 Big West).

== Roster ==
2005–06 Pacific Tigers men's basketball team
Players	Coaches
Pos. / # / Name / Height / Weight / Year / Hometown; F / 13 / Christian Maraker / 6 ft 9 in (2.06 m) / 235 lb (107 kg) / Sr	Head coach: Bob Thomason (Pacific); Assistant coach(es) Legend: (C) Team captain; (S) Suspended; (I) Ineligible; (W) Walk-on; Injured; Current redshirt; Roster

== Schedule and results ==
Date time, TV	Rank^{#}	Opponent^{#}	Result	Record	Site (attendance) city, state
Regular season
Big West tournament
NCAA tournament
Mar 16, 2006*; 9:40 a.m.	(13 MSP)	vs. (4 MSP) No. 7 Boston College; First round	L 76–88 ^{2OT}	24–8	Jon M. Huntsman Center; Salt Lake City, Utah
*Non-conference game. ^{#}Rankings from AP Poll. (#) Tournament seedings in parentheses. MSP=Minneapolis. All times are in Pacific Time.

== Awards and honors ==
- Bob Thomason – Big West Coach of the Year
