= 1999 Big West Conference men's basketball tournament =

- Classification: Division I
- Season: 1998–99
- Teams: 8
- Site: Lawlor Events Center; Reno, NV
- Champions: New Mexico State (3rd title)
- Winning coach: Lou Henson (1st title)
- MVP: Billy Keys (New Mexico State)

1998–99 Big West men's basketball standings
	Conf.				Overall
Team	W		L	PCT	W		L	PCT
East Division
Boise State	12	–	4	.750	21	–	8	.724
New Mexico State †	12	–	4	.750	23	–	10	.697
Idaho	11	–	5	.688	16	–	11	.593
Utah State	8	–	8	.500	15	–	13	.536
Nevada	4	–	12	.250	8	–	18	.308
North Texas	4	–	12	.250	4	–	22	.154
West Division
UC Santa Barbara	12	–	4	.750	15	–	13	.536
Long Beach State	9	–	7	.563	13	–	15	.464
Pacific	9	–	7	.563	14	–	13	.519
Cal State Fullerton	7	–	9	.438	13	–	14	.481
Cal Poly	6	–	10	.375	11	–	16	.407
UC Irvine	2	–	14	.125	6	–	20	.231
† 1999 Big West tournament winner As of April 10, 1999; Rankings from AP poll

The 1999 Big West Conference men's basketball tournament was held March 4–6 at Lawlor Events Center in Reno, Nevada.

New Mexico State defeated Boise State in the championship game, 79–69, to obtain the third Big West Conference Men's Basketball Tournament championship in school history.

The Aggies participated in the 1999 NCAA Division I men's basketball tournament after earning the conference's automatic bid.

== Format ==
Eight of the 12 teams in the conference participated, with Cal Poly, Nevada, North Texas, and UC Irvine not qualifying. The top eight teams were seeded based on regular season conference records.

== Bracket ==
Quarterfinals; Friday, March 4
W1	UC Santa Barbara	75
E4	Utah State	74
W3	Pacific	78
E2	New Mexico State	89
E3	Idaho	76
W2	Long Beach State	81
W4	Cal State Fullerton	60
E1	Boise State	77

Semifinals; Saturday, March 5
W1	UC Santa Barbara	67
E2	New Mexico State	78
W2	Long Beach State	58
W1	Boise State	71

Championship; Sunday, March 6
E2	New Mexico State	79
E1	Boise State	69
