= Don Brown (offensive lineman) =

American football player (born 1959)

No. 61
- Position: Offensive tackle

Personal information
- Born: April 2, 1959 (age 67); San Jose, California, U.S.
- Listed height: 6 ft 6 in (1.98 m)
- Listed weight: 262 lb (119 kg)

Career information
- High school: Camden (San Jose)
- College: Santa Clara (1977–1981)
- NFL draft: 1982: undrafted

Career history
- San Diego Chargers (1982–1983)

Career NFL statistics
- Games played: 13
- Stats at Pro Football Reference

Donald Colby Brown (born April 2, 1959) is an American former professional football player who was an offensive lineman for one season with the San Diego Chargers of the National Football League (NFL). He played college football for the Santa Clara Broncos.

== Early life and college ==
Donald Colby Brown was born on April 2, 1959, in San Jose, California. He attended Camden High School in San Jose.

He was a member of the Santa Clara Broncos of the University of Santa Clara from 1977 to 1981.

== Professional career ==
After going undrafted in the 1982 NFL draft, Brown signed with the San Diego Chargers on July 7, 1982. He was placed on injured reserve with a back injury on September 6, 1982, and spent the entire season there. He played in 13 games for the Chargers in 1983. Brown was listed as an offensive tackle and wore jersey number 61 while with the Chargers. He was released on August 28, 1984. He was re-signed on April 12, 1985, but released later that year.
