= 2003–04 Idaho Vandals men's basketball team =

American college basketball season

2003–04 Idaho Vandals men's basketball
- Conference: Big West Conference
- Record: 14–16 (9–9 Big West)
- Head coach: Leonard Perry (3rd season)
- Home arena: Cowan Spectrum

2003–04 Big West men's basketball standings
	Conf.				Overall
Team	W		L	PCT	W		L	PCT
No. 25 Utah State	17	–	1	.944	25	–	4	.862
Pacific †	17	–	1	.944	25	–	8	.758
UC Santa Barbara	10	–	8	.556	16	–	12	.571
Idaho	9	–	9	.500	14	–	16	.467
UC Riverside	7	–	11	.389	11	–	17	.393
Cal State Northridge	7	–	11	.389	14	–	16	.467
Cal State Fullerton	7	–	11	.389	11	–	17	.393
Cal Poly	6	–	12	.333	11	–	16	.407
UC Irvine	6	–	12	.333	11	–	17	.393
Long Beach State	4	–	14	.222	6	–	21	.222
† 2004 Big West tournament winner As of April 10, 2004; Rankings from AP poll

The 2003–04 Idaho Vandals men's basketball team represented the University of Idaho during the 2003–04 NCAA Division I men's basketball season. Members of the Big West Conference, the Vandals were led by third-year head coach Leonard Perry and played their home games on campus at Cowan Spectrum in Moscow, Idaho.

The Vandals were 13–15 overall in the regular season and 9–9 in conference play, fourth in the standings.

Idaho met fifth seed UC Riverside in the quarterfinal of the conference tournament in Anaheim and defeated the Highlanders for their first-ever victory in the Big West tourney. The following night in the semifinal, they lost to second-seed Pacific by six points.

== Postseason results ==
Date time, TV	Opponent	Result	Record	Site (attendance) city, state
Big West tournament
Thu, March 11; 8:30 pm	vs. (5) UC Riverside; Quarterfinal	W 66–58	14–15	Anaheim Convention Center (2,655); Anaheim, California
Fri, March 12; 8:30 pm	vs. (2) Pacific; Semifinal	L 61–67	14–16	Anaheim Convention Center (5,548); Anaheim, California
*Non-conference game. ^{#}Rankings from AP poll. (#) Tournament seedings in parentheses. All times are in Pacific time.
