= 1998–99 New Mexico State Aggies basketball team =

American college basketball season

1998–99 New Mexico State Aggies men's basketball

Big West Regular season co-champions Big West tournament champions

NCAA tournament, First round
- Conference: Big West Conference
- Record: 23–10 (12–4 Big West)
- Head coach: Lou Henson (2nd season)
- Home arena: Pan American Center

1998–99 Big West men's basketball standings
	Conf.				Overall
Team	W		L	PCT	W		L	PCT
East Division
Boise State	12	–	4	.750	21	–	8	.724
New Mexico State †	12	–	4	.750	23	–	10	.697
Idaho	11	–	5	.688	16	–	11	.593
Utah State	8	–	8	.500	15	–	13	.536
Nevada	4	–	12	.250	8	–	18	.308
North Texas	4	–	12	.250	4	–	22	.154
West Division
UC Santa Barbara	12	–	4	.750	15	–	13	.536
Long Beach State	9	–	7	.563	13	–	15	.464
Pacific	9	–	7	.563	14	–	13	.519
Cal State Fullerton	7	–	9	.438	13	–	14	.481
Cal Poly	6	–	10	.375	11	–	16	.407
UC Irvine	2	–	14	.125	6	–	20	.231
† 1999 Big West tournament winner As of April 10, 1999; Rankings from AP poll

The 1998–99 New Mexico State Aggies basketball team represented New Mexico State University in the 1998–99 college basketball season. This was Lou Henson's 2nd season as head coach at his alma mater. The Aggies played their home games at Pan American Center and competed in the Big West Conference. They finished the season 23–10, 12–4 in Big West play to tie for the conference regular season title. They won the Big West tournament, and received an automatic bid to the NCAA tournament as No. 14 seed in the Midwest region.

In the opening round, New Mexico State was defeated by No. 3 seed and defending National champion Kentucky, 82–60.

== Roster ==
1998–99 New Mexico State Aggies men's basketball team
Players
Coaches

Pos.	#	Name	Height	Weight	Year	Hometown
G		Billy Keys	6 ft 2 in (1.88 m)	205 lb (93 kg)	Jr	Chicago, Illinois
F		Charles Gosa	6 ft 9 in (2.06 m)	—	Sr
G		Eric Channing	6 ft 4 in (1.93 m)	—	Fr

Head coach

- Lou Henson (New Mexico A&M)

Assistant coach(es)

Legend

- (C) Team captain
- (S) Suspended
- (I) Ineligible
- (W) Walk-on
- Injured
- Current redshirt

== Schedule and results ==
Date time, TV	Rank^{#}	Opponent^{#}	Result	Record	Site (attendance) city, state
Regular season
Nov 13, 1998*		at UTEP	W 59–57	1–0	Don Haskins Center; El Paso, Texas
Nov 20, 1998*		vs. Wisconsin	W 66–52	2–0	Carlson Center; Fairbanks, Alaska
Nov 21, 1998*		vs. No. 19 Arkansas	L 60–66	2–1	Carlson Center; Fairbanks, Alaska
Nov 22, 1998*		at Alaska-Fairbanks	L 65–71	2–2	Carlson Center; Fairbanks, Alaska
Nov 25, 1998*		at Texas Tech	L 43–70	2–3	Lubbock Municipal Coliseum; Lubbock, Texas
Nov 28, 1998*		at UTEP	W 77–66	3–3	Don Haskins Center; El Paso, Texas
Dec 1, 1998*		Western New Mexico	W 92–64	4–3	Pan American Center; Las Cruces, New Mexico
Dec 15, 1998*		Texas Southern	W 82–46	5–3	Pan American Center; Las Cruces, New Mexico
Dec 19, 1998*		at Washington	L 53–73	5–4	Hec Edmundson Pavilion; Seattle, Washington
Dec 22, 1998*		at San Diego State	W 66–55	6–4	Cox Arena; San Diego, California
Dec 29, 1998*		Alaska-Fairbanks	W 78–64	7–4	Pan American Center; Las Cruces, New Mexico
Jan 2, 1999*		at No. 15 New Mexico	L 66–77	7–5	University Arena; Albuquerque, New Mexico
Jan 7, 1999		at Cal State Fullerton	W 61–54	8–5 (1–0)	Titan Gym; Fullerton, California
Jan 9, 1999		at UC Irvine	W 60–56	9–5 (2–0)	Bren Events Center; Irvine, California
Jan 14, 1999		Long Beach State	W 60–46	10–5 (3–0)	Pan American Center; Las Cruces, New Mexico
Jan 16, 1999		Pacific	W 66–61	11–5 (4–0)	Pan American Center; Las Cruces, New Mexico
Jan 19, 1999*		No. 12 New Mexico	W 76–55	12–5	Pan American Center; Las Cruces, New Mexico
Jan 21, 1999		North Texas	W 89–80	13–5 (5–0)	Pan American Center; Las Cruces, New Mexico
Jan 23, 1999		UC Santa Barbara	W 83–61	14–5 (6–0)	Pan American Center; Las Cruces, New Mexico
Jan 28, 1999		at Nevada	W 75–63	15–5 (7–0)	Lawlor Events Center; Reno, Nevada
Jan 30, 1999		at Utah State	L 54–61	15–6 (7–1)	Dee Glen Smith Spectrum; Logan, Utah
Feb 6, 1999		Boise State	L 48–67	15–7 (7–2)	Pan American Center; Las Cruces, New Mexico
Feb 8, 1999		Idaho	W 80–73	16–7 (8–2)	Pan American Center; Las Cruces, New Mexico
Feb 11, 1999		at Idaho	L 78–82	16–8 (8–3)	Cowan Spectrum; Moscow, Idaho
Big West tournament
Mar 4, 1999*		vs. Pacific; Quarterfinals	W 89–78	21–9	Lawlor Events Center; Reno, Nevada
Mar 5, 1999*		vs. UC Santa Barbara; Semifinals	W 78–67	22–9	Lawlor Events Center; Reno, Nevada
Mar 6, 1999*		vs. Boise State; Championship game	W 79–69	23–9	Lawlor Events Center; Reno, Nevada
NCAA tournament
Mar 12, 1999*	(14 MW)	vs. (3 MW) No. 8 Kentucky; First round	L 60–82	23–10	Louisiana Superdome; New Orleans, Louisiana
*Non-conference game. ^{#}Rankings from AP Poll. (#) Tournament seedings in parentheses. MW=Midwest. All times are in Mountain Time.
