= Lou Henson =

American basketball coach (1932–2020)

Biographical details
- Born: January 10, 1932; Okay, Oklahoma, U.S.
- Died: July 25, 2020 (aged 88); Champaign, Illinois, U.S.

Playing career
- 1951–1953: Connors JC
- 1953–1955: New Mexico A&M
- Position: Guard

Coaching career (HC unless noted)
- 1956–1958: Las Cruces HS (JV)
- 1958–1962: Las Cruces HS
- 1962–1966: Hardin–Simmons
- 1966–1975: New Mexico State
- 1975–1996: Illinois
- 1997–2005: New Mexico State

Administrative career (AD unless noted)
- 1967–1975: New Mexico State

Head coaching record
- Overall: 779–422
- Tournaments: 19–20 (NCAA); 5–4 (NIT)

Accomplishments and honors

Championships
- 2 NCAA Regional – Final Four (1970, 1989); Big Ten regular season (1984); Big West regular season (1999); Big West tournament (1999)

Awards
- MVC Coach of the Year (1975); Big Ten Coach of the Year (1993)
- College Basketball Hall of Fame; Inducted in 2015

Louis Ray Henson (January 10, 1932 – July 25, 2020) was an American college basketball coach. He retired as the all-time leader in victories at the University of Illinois with 423 victories and New Mexico State with 289 victories. Overall, Henson won 779 games putting him in sixteenth place on the all-time list. Henson was also one of only four NCAA coaches to have amassed at least 200 total wins at two institutions. On February 17, 2015, Henson was selected as a member of the National Collegiate Basketball Hall of Fame. In August 2015, prior to the reopening of the newly renovated State Farm Center at the University of Illinois, the hardwood floor was dedicated and renamed Lou Henson Court in his honor. The court at the Pan American Center at New Mexico State University is also named in his honor.

== Early life and education ==
Born in Okay, Oklahoma, Henson graduated from Okay High School in 1951 and matriculated at Connors Junior College before transferring to New Mexico College of Agriculture and Mechanic Arts (New Mexico A&M, now New Mexico State University). He lettered in basketball for the New Mexico A&M Aggies from 1953 to 1955 and graduated with a bachelor's degree in 1955 and master's degree in 1956.

== Career ==
Henson began his coaching career at Las Cruces High School in Las Cruces, New Mexico, in 1956. After two years as junior varsity coach, Henson was head coach of the varsity team from 1958 to 1962 and won state championships in 1959, 1960, and 1961.

He started coaching in the college ranks in 1962 at Hardin-Simmons University. As a condition of taking the Hardin-Simmons job, Henson insisted that the team (and thus the school) be racially integrated, a condition to which the university agreed. In 1966, he took over at his alma mater, New Mexico State University. In his first season at NMSU, the Aggies rebounded from a 4–22 record in the prior season to finish 15–11 and went to the NCAA tournament. In 1970, Henson would help lead the Aggies to the Final Four for the only time in the school's history. Henson and future NBA players Jimmy Collins, Sam Lacey, and Charlie Criss lost in the tournament semifinal to eventual champion UCLA, the third time in three years the Aggies lost to UCLA in the tournament. Henson coached at New Mexico State for nine seasons, with six trips to the NCAA Tournament and four twenty-win seasons.

In 1975, Henson moved to the University of Illinois to replace Gene Bartow, after Bartow left Illinois to replace John Wooden at UCLA. Prior to the start of his first Illini season, he founded the Orange Krush with four students. In 21 years at Illinois, Henson garnered 423 wins and 224 losses (.654 winning percentage), and with a record of 214 wins and 164 losses (.567) in Big Ten Conference games. The 214 wins in Big Ten games were the third highest total ever at the time of his retirement. His best Fighting Illini team was the 1988–89 unit, which won a then-school record 31 games and went to the Final Four. At Illinois, Henson coached many future NBA players, including Eddie Johnson, Derek Harper, Ken Norman, Nick Anderson, Kendall Gill, Kenny Battle, Marcus Liberty, Steve Bardo, and Kiwane Garris, and was known for his trademark Lou-Do. Henson retired from Illinois at the end of the 1996–1997 season.

In 1997, Henson returned to New Mexico State as interim head coach after Neil McCarthy was abruptly fired before the start of the season. Henson wanted to donate his time, but was told that state law didn't allow him to coach for free. He finally accepted a nominal salary of $1 per month. After a successful season, he was given his old job back on a permanent basis. His 1998–99 team won the Big West regular season and tournament titles—notably, the first time in Henson's career that he had won a conference tournament. He retired for good midway through the 2004–05 season due to non-Hodgkin's lymphoma. His second stint allowed him to regain his standing as New Mexico State's all-time winningest coach, passing McCarthy.

== Health problems ==
In July 2007, Henson announced that he was again undergoing chemotherapy for the same strain of lymphoma that he had battled four years previously. He was undergoing treatment in Champaign, Illinois, where he lived in the summer. In July 2015, Henson once again entered chemotherapy for "bone marrow problems."

Henson "returned to coaching" at age 82 as coach of the New Mexico House of Representatives team in a charity contest versus the New Mexico State Senate team on February 7, 2014.

Henson died on July 25, 2020, at the age of 88.

== Head coaching record ==
Record table
Season	Team	Overall	Conference	Standing	Postseason
Hardin–Simmons Cowboys (NCAA University Division independent) (1962–1966)
1962–63	Hardin–Simmons	10–16			
1963–64	Hardin–Simmons	20–6			
1964–65	Hardin–Simmons	17–8			
1965–66	Hardin–Simmons	20–6			
Hardin-Simmons:		67–36			
New Mexico State Aggies (NCAA University Division independent) (1966–1970)
1966–67	New Mexico State	15–11			
1967–68	New Mexico State	23–6			NCAA University Division Regional semifinal
1968–69	New Mexico State	24–5			NCAA University Division Regional quarterfinal
1969–70	New Mexico State	27–3			NCAA University Division Final Four
New Mexico State Aggies (Missouri Valley Conference) (1970–1975)
1970–71	New Mexico State	19–8	0–0^{‡}		NCAA University Division Regional quarterfinal
1971–72	New Mexico State	19–6	0–0^{‡}		
1972–73	New Mexico State	12–14	6–7	T–4th	
1973–74	New Mexico State	14–11	7–6	T–3rd	
1974–75	New Mexico State	20–7	11–3	2nd	NCAA Division I First Round
New Mexico State:		173–71	24–16		
Illinois Fighting Illini (Big Ten Conference) (1975–1996)
1975–76	Illinois	14–13	7–11	T–7th	
1976–77	Illinois	16–14	8–10	6th	
1977–78	Illinois	13–14	7–11	7th	
1978–79	Illinois	19–11	7–11	7th	
1979–80	Illinois	22–13	8–10	T–6th	NIT Third Place
1980–81	Illinois	21–8	12–6	3rd	NCAA Division I Sweet 16
1981–82	Illinois	18–11	10–8	6th	NIT second round
1982–83	Illinois	21–11	11–7	T–2nd	NCAA Division I First Round
1983–84	Illinois	26–5	15–3	T–1st	NCAA Division I Elite Eight
1984–85	Illinois	26–9	12–6	2nd	NCAA Division I Sweet 16
1985–86	Illinois	22–10	11–7	T–4th	NCAA Division I Second Round
1986–87	Illinois	23–8	13–5	4th	NCAA Division I First Round
1987–88	Illinois	23–10	12–6	T–3rd	NCAA Division I Second Round
1988–89	Illinois	31–5	14–4	2nd	NCAA Division I Final Four
1989–90	Illinois	21–8	11–7	T–4th	NCAA Division I First Round
1990–91	Illinois	21–10	11–7	T–3rd	Postseason ban
1991–92	Illinois	13–15	7–11	8th	
1992–93	Illinois	19–13	11–7	T–3rd	NCAA Division I Second Round
1993–94	Illinois	17–11	10–8	T–4th	NCAA Division I First Round
1994–95	Illinois	19–12	10–8	T–5th	NCAA Division I First Round
1995–96	Illinois	18–13	7–11	9th	NIT first round
Illinois:		423–224	214–164		
New Mexico State Aggies (Big West Conference) (1997–2000)
1997–98	New Mexico State	18–12	8–8^{*}	T–7th	
1998–99	New Mexico State	23–10	12–4	1st	NCAA Division I First Round
1999–00	New Mexico State	22–10	11–5	7th	NIT first round
New Mexico State Aggies (Sun Belt Conference) (2000–2005)
2000–01	New Mexico State	14–14	10–6	T–2nd (West)	
2001–02	New Mexico State	20–12	11–4	T–1st (West)	
2002–03	New Mexico State	20–9	9–6	2nd(West)	
2003–04	New Mexico State	13–14	6–9	T–4th (West)	
2004–05	New Mexico State	5–13^{†}	1–4^{†}	^{†}(West)	
New Mexico State:		135–86	66–46		
Total:		779–412			
National champion Postseason invitational champion Conference regular season champion Conference regular season and conference tournament champion Division regular season champion Division regular season and conference tournament champion Conference tournament champion

^{‡} New Mexico State ineligible for conference championship
^{*} Record vacated due to NCAA infractions
^{†} Henson resigned on January 22, 2005, and was replaced that day by interim head coach Tony Stubblefield; their collective record in the 2004–05 season was 6–24 (1–14 Sun Belt) for a sixth-place finish in the Sun Belt West division.

== See also ==
- List of college men's basketball coaches with 600 wins
- List of NCAA Division I Men's Final Four appearances by coach
- Lou Henson Award
