= Okay, Oklahoma =

- Town
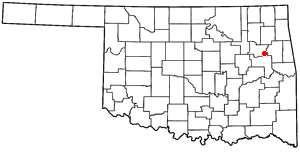
- Location of Okay, Oklahoma
- Coordinates: 35°51′10″N 95°18′57″W
- Country: United States
- State: Oklahoma
- County: Wagoner

Area
  - Total: 0.79 sq mi (2.05 km^{2})
  - Land: 0.79 sq mi (2.05 km^{2})
  - Water: 0 sq mi (0.00 km^{2})
- Elevation: 545 ft (166 m)

Population (2020)
  - Total: 505
  - Density: 636.9/sq mi (245.89/km^{2})
- Time zone: UTC-6 (Central (CST))
  - Summer (DST): UTC-5 (CDT)
- ZIP code: 74446
- Area codes: 539/918
- FIPS code: 40-54100
- GNIS feature ID: 1096195

Okay is a town along the east bank of the Verdigris River in Wagoner County, Oklahoma, United States. As of the 2020 census, Okay had a population of 505.

== Etymology and history ==
Okay's history as a community began circa 1806, when a French trader named Joseph Bogy established a trading post in the Three Forks area of what would eventually become the state of Oklahoma. (Note: The Osage who lived nearby, and claimed to control the area, regularly visited the post to barter for ammunition. Their enemies, the Choctaws, also visited to rob the post and punish Bogy for trading with the Osage.) The firm of Brand and Barbour took over the post later. When Barbour died in 1822, A. P. Chouteau, who had already established a trading post at Salina bought the Three Forks post. At the time, the post included twelve houses and a ferry. Chouteau expanded his business by bringing in Creole carpenters to construct keelboats that local traders needed to transport the goods they obtained from the local Indians to New Orleans and St. Louis. For a while, the Osage tribe claimed ownership of the land, which they ceded to the Western Cherokees before the Trail of Tears. Then the Western Creeks were allowed to settle on part of the land. In 1828, the Federal Government bought Chouteau's land for construction of a Creek Agency.

The settlement had various names before 1919. The St. Louis, Iron Mountain and Southern Railway called a nearby switch Coretta, and the US Post Office adopted the name in 1891. The Cook Gang robbed the train at Coretta on 1894. The name Falls City was also current, from nearby rapids on the Verdigris River. The post office name changed to Rex in 1900 and North Muskogee in 1911. The name Okay was adopted on October 18, 1919, after the "O. K. Trucks" brand of oil tankers made at a factory built there in 1915 by the Oklahoma Auto Manufacturing Company, which later renamed itself the "O. K. Truck Manufacturing Company". Okay has been noted for its unusual place name.

A fire destroyed most of the business district in 1936, including two general stores, a church, the post office, and two vacant buildings. Only two businesses, a filling station and a blacksmith shop, survived the disaster.

== Geography ==
According to the United States Census Bureau, the town has a total area of 0.8 square miles (2.1 km^{2}), all land.

== Demographics ==
Historical population
Census	Pop.	Note	%±
1930	248		—
1940	322		29.8%
1950	427		32.6%
1960	419		−1.9%
1970	419		0.0%
1980	554		32.2%
1990	528		−4.7%
2000	597		13.1%
2010	620		3.9%
2020	505		−18.5%
U.S. Decennial Census

=== 2020 census ===
As of the 2020 census, Okay had a population of 505. The median age was 42.3 years. 22.4% of residents were under the age of 18 and 17.0% of residents were 65 years of age or older. For every 100 females there were 81.7 males, and for every 100 females age 18 and over there were 86.7 males age 18 and over.

0.0% of residents lived in urban areas, while 100.0% lived in rural areas.

There were 211 households in Okay, of which 33.6% had children under the age of 18 living in them. Of all households, 39.8% were married-couple households, 20.4% were households with a male householder and no spouse or partner present, and 30.8% were households with a female householder and no spouse or partner present. About 24.1% of all households were made up of individuals and 8.5% had someone living alone who was 65 years of age or older.

There were 244 housing units, of which 13.5% were vacant. The homeowner vacancy rate was 1.3% and the rental vacancy rate was 0.0%.

Racial composition as of the 2020 census
Race	Number	Percent
White	308	61.0%
Black or African American	4	0.8%
American Indian and Alaska Native	110	21.8%
Asian	0	0.0%
Native Hawaiian and Other Pacific Islander	0	0.0%
Some other race	2	0.4%
Two or more races	81	16.0%
Hispanic or Latino (of any race)	13	2.6%

=== 2000 census ===
As of the census of 2000, there were 597 people, 227 households, and 165 families residing in the town. The population density was 737.3 inhabitants per square mile (284.7/km^{2}). There were 278 housing units at an average density of 343.3 per square mile (132.5/km^{2}). The racial makeup of the town was 64.15% White, 4.36% African American, 21.27% Native American, 0.17% Asian, 0.50% Pacific Islander, 1.84% from other races, and 7.71% from two or more races. Hispanic or Latino of any race were 3.69% of the population.

There were 227 households, out of which 35.2% had children under the age of 18 living with them, 48.9% were married couples living together, 18.1% had a female householder with no husband present, and 26.9% were non-families. 23.8% of all households were made up of individuals, and 10.6% had someone living alone who was 65 years of age or older. The average household size was 2.63 and the average family size was 3.11.

In the town, the population was spread out, with 30.7% under the age of 18, 8.0% from 18 to 24, 25.6% from 25 to 44, 23.8% from 45 to 64, and 11.9% who were 65 years of age or older. The median age was 36 years. For every 100 females, there were 97.0 males. For every 100 females age 18 and over, there were 92.6 males.

The median income for a household in the town was $20,385, and the median income for a family was $23,472. Males had a median income of $21,000 versus $14,444 for females. The per capita income for the town was $9,758. About 26.2% of families and 27.8% of the population were below the poverty line, including 31.9% of those under age 18 and 34.2% of those age 65 or over.

== Education ==
The Okay School District covers all grades from PK through 12, with Okay High School covering grades 9 through 12.

According to the Huffington Post, the Okay Public School Board of Education instituted a policy of allowing teachers to have guns in its schools. On February 1, 2016, the signs that had read, "Gun Free School Zone," were replaced by signs reading, "Attention. Please be aware that certain staff members at Okay Public Schools can be legally armed and may use whatever force is necessary to protect our students."

Superintendent Charles McMahan was quoted as saying that, "No specific incident caused us to pass this policy. ...With everything that is going on in the world, we've heard that you may possibly see more attacks from radical groups looking for children." McMahan pointed out that Okay has only one police officer. Other law enforcement officers can respond from Wagoner, Oklahoma in about 10 minutes. He added that about five percent of the Okay teachers are armed.

Teachers participating in the program must have a concealed carry permit, a certificate from Oklahoma's Council on Law Enforcement Education and Training, a psychiatric evaluation and take a shooting course three times a year. They must carry their own guns (45 caliber or less), or keep them in a locked box at school. The policy also requires the armed teachers wear an identifying badge, hat or jacket.

== Notable people ==
- Lou Henson, born in Okay in 1932 (died 2020). He was a former NCAA Division I college basketball coach and is a member of the National Collegiate Basketball Hall of Fame.
- Katie Rain Hill, transgender writer and activisit
