= 1997 Big West Conference men's basketball tournament =

- Classification: Division I
- Season: 1996–97
- Teams: 8
- Site: Lawlor Events Center; Reno, NV
- Champions: Pacific (2nd title)
- Winning coach: Bob Thomason (1st title)
- MVP: Corey Anders (Pacific), Faron Hand (Nevada)

1996–97 Big West men's basketball standings
	Conf.				Overall
Team	W		L	PCT	W		L	PCT
East Division
Utah State	12	–	4	.750	20	–	9	.690
New Mexico State	12	–	4	.750	19	–	9	.679
Nevada	12	–	4	.750	21	–	10	.677
Boise State	9	–	7	.563	14	–	13	.519
Idaho	5	–	11	.313	13	–	17	.433
North Texas	5	–	11	.313	10	–	16	.385
West Division
Pacific †	12	–	4	.750	24	–	6	.800
Long Beach State	9	–	7	.563	13	–	14	.481
UC Santa Barbara	7	–	9	.438	12	–	15	.444
Cal State Fullerton	6	–	10	.375	13	–	14	.481
Cal Poly	6	–	10	.375	14	–	16	.467
UC Irvine	1	–	15	.063	1	–	25	.038
† 1997 Big West tournament winner As of April 1, 1997; Rankings from AP poll

The 1997 Big West Conference men's basketball tournament was held March 7–9 at Lawlor Events Center in Reno, Nevada.

Pacific defeated Nevada in the championship game, 63–55, to obtain the first Big West Conference men's basketball tournament championship in school history.

The Tigers participated in the 1997 NCAA Division I men's basketball tournament after earning the conference's automatic bid.

== Format ==
Eight of the 12 teams in the conference participated, with Cal Poly, Idaho, North Texas, and UC Irvine not qualifying. The top eight teams were seeded based on regular season conference records.

== Bracket ==
Quarterfinals; Friday, March 7
E1	Nevada	80
W4	Cal State Fullerton	55
E3	New Mexico State	77
W2	Long Beach State	57
W1	Pacific	65
E4	Boise State	52
W3	UC Santa Barbara	66
E2	Utah State	81

Semifinals; Saturday, March 8
E1	Nevada	80
E3	New Mexico State	63
W1	Pacific	71
E2	Utah State	54

Championship; Sunday, March 9
E1	Nevada	55
W1	Pacific	63
