= 2006 Big West Conference men's basketball tournament =

Californian basketball tournament

- Classification: Division I
- Season: 2005–06
- Teams: 8
- Site: Anaheim Convention Center; Anaheim, CA
- Champions: Pacific (4th title)
- Winning coach: Bob Thomason (3rd title)
- MVP: Johnny Gray (Pacific)

2005–06 Big West men's basketball standings
	Conf.				Overall
Team	W		L	PCT	W		L	PCT
Pacific †	12	–	2	.857	24	–	8	.750
UC Irvine	10	–	4	.714	16	–	13	.552
Cal Poly	7	–	7	.500	10	–	19	.345
UC Santa Barbara	6	–	8	.429	15	–	14	.517
Cal State Fullerton	5	–	9	.357	16	–	13	.552
Cal State Northridge	4	–	10	.286	11	–	17	.393
UC Riverside	3	–	11	.214	5	–	23	.179
*Long Beach State	0	–	5	.000	0	–	12	.000
† 2006 Big West tournament winner As of April 10, 2006; *Long Beach State: 18 wins vacated due to sanctions against the program; Disputed record: Long Beach State–(18–12)(9–5); Rankings from AP poll

The 2006 Big West Conference men's basketball tournament was held March 8–11 at Anaheim Convention Center in Anaheim, California.

Pacific defeated Long Beach State in the championship game, 78–70, to obtain the fourth Big West Conference men's basketball tournament championship in school history.

The Tigers earned the conference's automatic bid to the 2006 NCAA tournament as the #14 seed in the Minneapolis region.

== Format ==
Eight of the nine teams in the conference participated, with not qualifying. Teams were seeded based on regular season conference records. The top four seeds received byes, with the top two seeds receiving a second bye into the semifinal round.

== Bracket ==
First round Thursday, March 8
5	UC Santa Barbara	76
8	UC Riverside	44
6	Cal State Fullerton	73
7	Cal State Northridge	63

Quarterfinals; Friday, March 9
4	Cal Poly	57
5	UC Santa Barbara	50
6	Cal State Fullerton	91
3	Long Beach State	94

Semifinals; Saturday, March 10
1	Pacific	68
4	Cal Poly	57
3	Long Beach State	75
2	UC Irvine	73

Championship; Sunday, March 11
1	Pacific	78
3	Long Beach State	70
