= Michael Olowokandi =

Nigerian basketball player (born 1975)

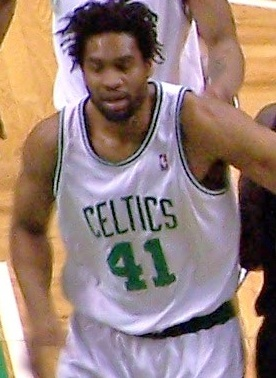
- Olowokandi with the Boston Celtics in 2006

Personal information
- Born: 3 April 1975 (age 51) Lagos, Nigeria
- Listed height: 7 ft 0 in (2.13 m)
- Listed weight: 270 lb (122 kg)

Career information
- College: Pacific (1995–1998)
- NBA draft: 1998: 1st round, 1st overall pick
- Drafted by: Los Angeles Clippers
- Playing career: 1999–2007
- Position: Center
- Number: 34, 41

Career history
- 1999: Kinder Bologna
- 1999–2003: Los Angeles Clippers
- 2003–2006: Minnesota Timberwolves
- 2006–2007: Boston Celtics

Career highlights
- NBA All-Rookie Second Team (1999); Big West Player of the Year (1998); First-team All-Big West (1998); No. 55 retired by Pacific Tigers

Career NBA statistics
- Points: 4,135 (8.3 ppg)
- Rebounds: 3,414 (6.8 rpg)
- Blocks: 697 (1.4 bpg)
- Stats at NBA.com
- Stats at Basketball Reference

Michael Olowokandi (born 3 April 1975) is a Nigerian former professional basketball player. Born in Lagos, Nigeria, and raised in London, he played collegiately for the Pacific Tigers in Stockton, California. Nicknamed "the Kandi Man," Olowokandi was selected as the first overall pick of the 1998 NBA draft by the Los Angeles Clippers. He played professionally until 2007, when he was forced to retire due to severe hernia and knee injuries.

== Early life ==
Olowokandi was born in Lagos, Nigeria, as the oldest of five children. His father, Ezekiel, was a Nigerian diplomat. When Olowokandi was aged 3, his family moved to London where he was raised. Olowokandi has Nigerian citizenship and did not hold a British passport as of 2004.

Olowokandi attended the Newlands Manor School in Seaford, East Sussex, where he set British age group records in long jump and triple jump and also played center midfield in football. Olowokandi had a height of 6 ft 8 in (2.03 m) at age 16, growing six inches in two years. He first touched a basketball at the age of 17, and began playing the sport when he was 18.

Olowokandi then entered Brunel University as a mechanical engineering major, where he was an athlete in track and field, cricket, and rugby union. He had a tryout with the Thames Valley Tigers of the Budweiser Basketball League but did not receive a contract.

== College career ==
On 3 April 1995, Olowokandi's 20th birthday, he opened the Peterson's Guide to American Colleges and Universities to a random page and landed on the University of the Pacific (UOP). Olowokandi called the UOP basketball office in hopes that he would be accepted to play basketball for the Pacific Tigers. UOP assistant coach Tony Marcopulos answered the phone call and was stunned when informed of Olowokandi's height of 7 ft 1 in (2.16 m). After being informed that there were no more available basketball scholarships at UOP, Olowokandi offered to pay for his schooling (about $23,000 annually) for two years. He also called the basketball staffs at Georgetown and Duke but was informed they would not offer scholarships without sending a scout to see him.

Olowokandi and Marcopulos spent hundreds of phone calls arranging credit transferral and National Collegiate Athletic Association (NCAA) eligibility, which was determined that Olowokandi had three seasons of college remaining. When Olowokandi arrived in the United States in August 1995, he had not played a game of organized basketball or met the UOP coaches; Pacific head coach Bob Thomason joked, "I had told him on the phone that if he wasn't 7 foot I was going to put him right back on the plane." Arriving as a sophomore in eligibility, Olowokandi had no understanding of basketball terminology and was in poor physical condition. He frequently committed backcourt and traveling violations in his early games but persisted with his progression and committed to extended practice sessions. Olowokandi became a star for the team during his junior season, averaging a team high 12.6 points, 7.4 rebounds and 1.9 blocks.

Olowokandi led his team to the 1997 NCAA Tournament and as a senior he led the Tigers to the 1998 National Invitation Tournament. He averaged 22 points, 11 rebounds, and 3 blocks per game his senior year and was the 1997–98 Big West Conference Player of the Year. Olowokandi was named as a 1998 Honorable Mention All-American by the Associated Press. He graduated from Pacific with a degree in Economics and had his No. 55 jersey retired by the university in 1998.

== Professional career ==
=== Los Angeles Clippers (1998–2003) ===
Olowokandi was considered to be a top two pick in the 1998 NBA draft due to his 7 ft 6 in (2.29 m) wingspan and "unlimited upside". He performed well at the NBA annual pre-draft events with his quickness, speed and strength. Olowokandi set records during his workouts in the Denver and Vancouver pre-draft camps, including a record for medicine ball dunks in Denver and running the 40-yard dash in 4.55 seconds. Fellow NBA player Andrew Lang said Olowokandi had some of the quickest feet he had ever seen while the two performed together at the camps.

Olowokandi was drafted with the first overall pick by the Los Angeles Clippers. Later in the lottery future Hall of Famers Paul Pierce, Dirk Nowitzki, and Vince Carter were selected, as well as future All-Star Antawn Jamison. The Clippers had initially planned to draft eventual second pick Mike Bibby but Elgin Baylor cited Olowokandi's work habits and off-season improvements as the swaying factors. The start of the 1998–99 NBA season was hampered due to a lockout and the Clippers were not allowed to contact Olowokandi. His agent, Bill Duffy, put Olowokandi in contact with Kareem Abdul-Jabbar, who trained together extensively during the 1998 offseason. Olokowandi signed with Italian team Kinder Bologna on 5 January 1999 — only two days before the lockout was resolved. In 3 regular season Italian League games played with Bologna, he averaged 4.7 points, 5.7 rebounds and 0.3 assists in 17.3 minutes per game. He also played for 3 games in the FIBA EuroLeague, where he averaged 10.7 points, 6.0 rebounds and 0.3 assists in 21.3 minutes per game. Bologna granted Olowokandi an early release to sign with the Clippers as he did not have a considerable impact and was poorly conditioned. Olowokandi claimed that he felt misused by the team and did not have his offensive abilities utilised.

Olowokandi signed with the Clippers on 29 January 1999. During his rookie season, he averaged 8.9 points and 7.9 rebounds in 45 games played for the Clippers. Olowokandi underwent surgery on his left knee on 11 May 1999, in what would be the first of multiple knee surgeries.

In the 2001–02 season, Olowokandi saw the most playing time of his career and averaged 11.1 points and 8.8 rebounds. After Abdul-Jabbar's stint, Olowokandi received tutelage from Clippers assistant coach Igor Kokoskov who worked with him on footwork and shot selection. Olowokandi received additional playing time after center Elton Brand was sidelined by a bruised left hip, and Olowokandi became "the Clippers’ go-to guy". He averaged 17 points a game and 11 rebounds during the last 20 games of the season and was considered one of the biggest free agents in the 2002–03 free agency class. On 5 April 2002, Olowokandi was fined $50,000 by the Clippers for "behavior detrimental to the team" after he criticized teammates for a loss against the Utah Jazz.

Olowokandi was coveted by the San Antonio Spurs to replace the retiring David Robinson. He was also a top choice for the Denver Nuggets, with Kiki VanDeWeghe of the Denver Nuggets considering Olowokandi to be a "legitimate center." However, Olowokandi resigned with the Clippers to their qualifying offer on 24 September 2002, following weeks of uncertainty in contract negotiations. Olowokandi injured his left knee during his extensive training during the offseason and missed most of the preseason. The team's apprehension in offering him a longterm contract extension caused conflict between the Clippers and Olowokandi, who by December 2002 had decided he would not again resign with the team. He also considered himself as having a limited role in coach Alvin Gentry's offense despite having a breakthrough season that saw improvements in his aggressiveness and consistency. Olowokandi's left knee injury flared up in January 2003 and he was placed on the injured list. He underwent knee surgery on 3 February 2003, and was ruled out for three to four weeks. Olowokandi was ultimately ruled out for the rest of the season by the Clippers in April.

Olowokandi averaged 9.9 points, 8.0 rebounds and 1.6 blocks in his 323 games played with the Clippers over five seasons. Abdul-Jabbar, who became an assistant coach for the Clippers during Olowokandi's tenure, considered Olowokandi "talented but uncoachable" and cited his lack of willingness to accept criticism in practice as being detrimental to his career.

=== Minnesota Timberwolves (2003–2006) ===
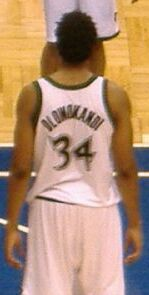
Olowokandi with the Timberwolves in 2005

Due to financial issues with the L.A. Clippers, Olowokandi signed with the Minnesota Timberwolves on a three-year, $16.2 million contract. Olowokandi had been considered the fourth most valuable free agent that offseason but received little interest from NBA teams and accepted the only solid deal he was offered. Olowokandi was enticed by Timberwolves general manager and former player Kevin McHale, who trained one-on-one together before the season started. Olowokandi again experienced pain and swelling in his left knee so had a second procedure before the start of the regular season that resulted in him missing all of training camp and attending only three team practices. He appeared sporadically in games for the Timberwolves during November and December due to tendinitis in his right knee. Olowokandi underwent surgery on 12 December 2003, and was ruled out indefinitely.

On 26 November 2004, Olowokandi was suspended by the Timberwolves for two games after he was arrested for refusing to leave an Indianapolis night club. On 16 January 2005, Olowokandi was suspended by the NBA for four games for a fight with Nenê of the Denver Nuggets during a game the previous night.

=== Boston Celtics (2006–2007) ===
On January 26, 2006, Olowokandi, Dwayne Jones, and Wally Szczerbiak were traded by the Timberwolves to the Boston Celtics, alongside a future first-round draft pick, for Justin Reed, Mark Blount, Ricky Davis, Marcus Banks and two future second-round draft picks.

In 500 regular season NBA games (399 games started), Olowokandi averaged 8.3 points, 6.8 rebounds, and 1.39 blocked shots per game. In 15 playoff games (2 starts), he averaged 2.1 points, 3.5 rebounds, and .7 blocks per game. Olowokandi is often considered to be a draft bust, failing to live up to the potential offered by his frame and athleticism.

== Charity ==
In 2001, Olowokandi and his Clippers teammates participated in the BasketBowl Challenge at Keystone Lanes in Norwalk, California, to raise funds for the Los Angeles Clippers Foundation and Children's Hospital Los Angeles.

During Thanksgiving of 2006, Olowokandi volunteered his time at the Boston Children's Hospital and served meals for over 200 homeless people at the Pine Street Inn in Boston. He has also donated to various charities and hospitals, including over $100,000 to the Children's Hospital Los Angeles for a new incubator for premature newborn infants. Many of Olowokandi's charitable projects were undisclosed and done privately without his teams' affiliations.

== Career statistics ==
Legend
GP	Games played	GS	Games started	MPG	Minutes per game
FG%	Field goal percentage	3P%	3-point field goal percentage	FT%	Free throw percentage
RPG	Rebounds per game	APG	Assists per game	SPG	Steals per game
BPG	Blocks per game	PPG	Points per game	**Bold**	Career high
*	Led the league

=== NBA ===
==== Regular season ====
Year	Team	GP	GS	MPG	FG%	3P%	FT%	RPG	APG	SPG	BPG	PPG
1998–99	L.A. Clippers	45	36	28.4	.431	–	.483	7.9	.6	.6	1.2	8.9
1999–2000	L.A. Clippers	80	77	31.2	.437	–	.651	8.2	.5	.4	1.8	9.8
2000–01	L.A. Clippers	**82**	**82***	25.9	.435	–	.545	6.4	.6	.4	1.3	8.5
2001–02	L.A. Clippers	80	79	32.1	.433	–	.622	8.9	1.1	**.7**	1.8	11.1
2002–03	L.A. Clippers	36	36	**38.0**	.427	–	.657	**9.1**	**1.3**	.5	**2.2**	**12.3**
2003–04	Minnesota	43	25	21.5	.425	–	.590	5.7	.6	.4	1.6	6.5
2004–05	Minnesota	62	34	19.6	**.456**	–	**.667**	5.2	.5	.2	.9	5.9
2005–06	Minnesota	32	24	23.5	.446	–	.487	5.6	.5	.6	.8	6.0
2005–06	Boston	16	0	10.4	.444	–	.625	2.6	.4	.2	.4	2.8
2006–07	Boston	24	0	9.8	.413	–	**.667**	2.0	.2	.3	.5	1.7
Career		500	393	26.3	.435	–	.597	6.8	.7	.5	1.4	8.3

==== Playoffs ====
Year	Team	GP	GS	MPG	FG%	3P%	FT%	RPG	APG	SPG	BPG	PPG
2004	Minnesota	15	2	14.9	.324	.000	.875	3.5	.1	.1	.7	2.1
Career		15	2	14.9	.324	.000	.875	3.5	.1	.1	.7	2.1

=== College ===
Year	Team	GP	GS	MPG	FG%	3P%	FT%	RPG	APG	SPG	BPG	PPG
1995–96	Pacific	25	–	10.3	.526	–	**.556**	3.4	.2	.1	1.3	4.0
1996–97	Pacific	19	–	**22.8**	.570	–	.333	6.6	.4	**.4**	1.7	10.9
1997–98	Pacific	**33**	–	–	**.609**	–	.485	**11.2**	**.8**	.3	**2.9**	**22.2**
Career		77	–	15.7	.592	–	.466	7.5	.5	.2	2.1	13.5
