= 2003–04 UC Irvine Anteaters men's basketball team =

American college basketball season

2003–04 UC Irvine Anteaters men's basketball
- Conference: Big West Conference
- Record: 11–17 (6–12 Big West)
- Head coach: Pat Douglass (7th season)
- Home arena: Bren Events Center

2003–04 Big West men's basketball standings
	Conf.				Overall
Team	W		L	PCT	W		L	PCT
No. 25 Utah State	17	–	1	.944	25	–	4	.862
Pacific †	17	–	1	.944	25	–	8	.758
UC Santa Barbara	10	–	8	.556	16	–	12	.571
Idaho	9	–	9	.500	14	–	16	.467
UC Riverside	7	–	11	.389	11	–	17	.393
Cal State Northridge	7	–	11	.389	14	–	16	.467
Cal State Fullerton	7	–	11	.389	11	–	17	.393
Cal Poly	6	–	12	.333	11	–	16	.407
UC Irvine	6	–	12	.333	11	–	17	.393
Long Beach State	4	–	14	.222	6	–	21	.222
† 2004 Big West tournament winner As of April 10, 2004; Rankings from AP poll

The 2003–04 UC Irvine Anteaters men's basketball team represented the University of California, Irvine during the 2003–04 NCAA Division I men's basketball season. The Anteaters were led by 7th year head coach Pat Douglass and played at the Bren Events Center. They were members of the Big West Conference.

== Previous season ==
The 2002–03 UC Irvine Anteaters men's basketball team finished the season with a record of 20–9 and 13–5 in Big West play.

== Roster ==
2003–04 UC Irvine Anteaters men's basketball team
Players
Coaches

Pos.	#	Name	Height	Weight	Year	Hometown
G		Aras Baskauskas	6 ft 4 in (1.93 m)	—	Sr
G	11	Nic Campbell	6 ft 6 in (1.98 m)	—	Fr
G		Mike Efevberha	6 ft 5 in (1.96 m)	195 lb (88 kg)	So	Pomona, CA
F	3	Greg Ethington	6 ft 8 in (2.03 m)	235 lb (107 kg)	Jr
G	10	Jeff Gloger	6 ft 5 in (1.96 m)	—	So
F		Mark Hill	6 ft 5 in (1.96 m)	—	Fr
F	40	Matt Okoro	6 ft 7 in (2.01 m)	210 lb (95 kg)	Sr
C		Adam Parada	7 ft 0 in (2.13 m)	265 lb (120 kg)	Sr	Alta Loma, CA
G	14	Ross Schraeder	6 ft 5 in (1.96 m)	—	So
F		Ryan Snook	6 ft 6 in (1.98 m)	—	Sr
G		J.R. Stephens	5 ft 11 in (1.8 m)	—	Jr
F		Stanislav Zuzak	6 ft 11 in (2.11 m)	—	Sr

Head coach

Pat Douglass (Pacific)

Assistant coach(es)

Legend

- (C) Team captain
- (S) Suspended
- (I) Ineligible
- (W) Walk-on
- Injured
- Current redshirt

Roster

== Schedule ==
Date time, TV	Rank^{#}	Opponent^{#}	Result	Record	Site (attendance) city, state
Regular Season
November 15, 2003*		vs. UIC; Dell BCA Classic	L 65–77	0–1	Cintas Center (9,987); Cincinnati, OH
November 16, 2003*		vs. San Diego; Bell BCA Classic	W 65–60	1–1	Cintas Center (455); Cincinnati, OH
November 17, 2003*		vs. Ohio; Bell BCA Classic	W 63–60	2–1	Cintas Center (408); Cincinnati, OH
November 25, 2003*		No. 20 Stanford	L 59–72	2–2	Bren Events Center (5,000); Irvine, CA
December 3, 2003*		at California	L 57–65	2–3	Haas Pavilion (11,069); Berkeley, CA
December 5, 2003*		vs. Princeton; McCaffrey Classic	W 57–55	3–3	Save Mart Center (14,309); Fresno, CA
December 6, 2003*		vs. Arkansas–Monticello; McCaffrey Classic	W 84–67	4–3	Selland Arena (14,420); Fresno, CA
December 18, 2003*		Pepperdine	W 85–83 ^{2OT}	5–3	Bren Events Center (2,089); Irvine, CA
December 20, 2003*		at Sacramento State	L 56–64	5–4	Hornets Nest (1,132); Sacramento, CA
January 3, 2004		Cal Poly	W 74–69	6–4 (1–0)	Bren Events Center (2,251); Irvine, CA
January 5, 2004		UC Santa Barbara	L 77–84	6–5 (1–1)	Bren Events Center (2,306); Irvine, CA
January 8, 2004		at Cal State Northridge	W 72–56	7–5 (2–1)	Matadome (1,311); Northridge, CA
January 10, 2004		at Pacific	L 52–67	7–6 (2–2)	Alex G. Spanos Center (3,625); Stockton, CA
January 15, 2004		UC Riverside	W 66–65	8–6 (3–2)	Bren Events Center (2,083); Irvine, CA
January 17, 2004		Cal State Fullerton	W 74–67	9–6 (4–2)	Bren Events Center (2,219); Irvine, CA
January 24, 2004		at Long Beach State	L 74–77 ^{OT}	9–7 (4–3)	The Pyramid (2,058); Long Beach, CA
January 29, 2004		at Utah State	L 48–57	9–8 (4–4)	Smith Spectrum (9,037); Logan, UT
January 31, 2004		at Idaho	L 52–57	9–9 (4–5)	Cowan Spectrum (2,037); Moscow, ID
February 5, 2004		Pacific	L 52–64	9–10 (4–6)	Bren Events Center (1,945); Irvine, CA
February 7, 2004		Cal State Norhtridge	L 51–56	9–11 (4–7)	Bren Events Center (5,000); Irvine, CA
February 12, 2004		at Cal State Fullerton	L 63–70	9–12 (4–8)	Titan Gym (1,612); Fullerton, CA
February 14, 2004		at UC Riverside	L 54–72	9–13 (4–9)	Student Recreation Center (863); Riverside, CA
February 18, 2004		Long Beach State	W 80–71	10–13 (5–9)	Bren Events Center (1,825); Irvine, CA
February 21, 2004*		at New Mexico State; BracketBusters	L 64–69	10–14	Pan American Center (4,582); Las Cruces, NM
February 26, 2004		Idaho	W 65–63	11–14 (6–9)	Bren Events Center (1,521); Irvine, CA
February 28, 2004		No. 24 Utah State	L 56–59	11–15 (6–10)	Bren Events Center (4,210); Irvine, CA
March 4, 2004		at vs. UC Santa Barbara	L 55–56	11–16 (6–11)	UC Santa Barbara Events Center (2,191); Santa Barbara, CA
March 6, 2004		at vs. Cal Poly	L 62–70	11–17 (6–12)	Mott Gym (3,032); San Luis Obispo, CA
*Non-conference game. ^{#}Rankings from AP Poll. (#) Tournament seedings in parentheses. All times are in Pacific Time.
