= 1996–97 UC Irvine Anteaters men's basketball team =

American college basketball season

1996–97 UC Irvine Anteaters men's basketball
- Conference: Big West Conference
- Record: 1–25 (1–15 Big West)
- Head coach: Rod Baker (6th season)
- Home arena: Bren Events Center

1996–97 Big West men's basketball standings
	Conf.				Overall
Team	W		L	PCT	W		L	PCT
East Division
Utah State	12	–	4	.750	20	–	9	.690
New Mexico State	12	–	4	.750	19	–	9	.679
Nevada	12	–	4	.750	21	–	10	.677
Boise State	9	–	7	.563	14	–	13	.519
Idaho	5	–	11	.313	13	–	17	.433
North Texas	5	–	11	.313	10	–	16	.385
West Division
Pacific †	12	–	4	.750	24	–	6	.800
Long Beach State	9	–	7	.563	13	–	14	.481
UC Santa Barbara	7	–	9	.438	12	–	15	.444
Cal State Fullerton	6	–	10	.375	13	–	14	.481
Cal Poly	6	–	10	.375	14	–	16	.467
UC Irvine	1	–	15	.063	1	–	25	.038
† 1997 Big West tournament winner As of April 1, 1997; Rankings from AP poll

The 1996–97 UC Irvine Anteaters men's basketball team represented the University of California, Irvine during the 1996–97 NCAA Division I men's basketball season. The Anteaters were led by sixth year head coach Rod Baker and played at the Bren Events Center and were members of the Big West Conference. They finished with the worst record in school history and Rod Baker was dismissed as head coach at the end of the season.

== Previous season ==
The 1995–96 UC Irvine Anteaters men's basketball team finished the season with a record of 15–12, 11–7 in Big West play.

== Roster ==
1996–97 UC Irvine Anteaters men's basketball team
Players
Coaches

Pos.	#	Name	Height	Weight	Year	Hometown
C		Dan Augulis	6 ft 10 in (2.08 m)	—	Sr
C		Andrew Carlson	6 ft 10 in (2.08 m)	—	Fr
G		Tony Dela Cruz	6 ft 5 in (1.96 m)	209 lb (95 kg)	Fr
C		Paul Foster	6 ft 8 in (2.03 m)	—	Sr
G		Juma Jackson	6 ft 5 in (1.96 m)	—	Fr
F		Brian Johnson	6 ft 6 in (1.98 m)	—	Fr
G		Jeremy Lee	5 ft 10 in (1.78 m)	—	Fr
G		Andrew Navar	6 ft 3 in (1.91 m)	—	So
G		Lamarr Parker	—	—	Fr
G		Phil Negrete	6 ft 5 in (1.96 m)	—	Fr
G		Scott Phillips	6 ft 4 in (1.93 m)	—	So
G		Damion Pugh	6 ft 2 in (1.88 m)	—	Fr
C		Boris Reznik	6 ft 10 in (2.08 m)	—	So
C		Wendell Robinson	6 ft 8 in (2.03 m)	—	Jr
G		Lamarr Parker	6 ft 1 in (1.85 m)	—	So

Head coach

Rod Baker (College of the Holy Cross)

Assistant coach(es)

Legend

- (C) Team captain
- (S) Suspended
- (I) Ineligible
- (W) Walk-on
- Injured
- Current redshirt

Roster

== Schedule ==
Date time, TV	Rank^{#}	Opponent^{#}	Result	Record	Site (attendance) city, state
Regular Season
November 22, 1996*		at San Diego State	L 88–100	0–1	Peterson Gym (1,598); San Diego, CA
December 2, 1996*		at Washington State	L 53–91	0–2	Beasley Coliseum (2,120); Pullman, WA
December 4, 1996*		at Eastern Washington	L 53–80	0–3	Reese Court (884); Cheney, WA
December 7, 1996*		UNLV	L 59–69	0–3	Bren Events Center (2,098); Irvine, CA
December 15, 1996*		USC	L 45–107	0–4	Bren Events Center (2,448); Irvine, CA
December 21, 1996*		at Cal State Northridge	L 53–77	0–5	Matadome (493); Northridge, CA
December 23, 1996*		San Diego	L 49–70	0–6	Bren Events Center (939); Irvine, CA
December 28, 1996*		Utah	L 50–77	0–7	Bren Events Center (2,022); Irvine, CA
January 4, 1997*		at San Francisco	L 44–77	0–8	War Memorial Gymnasium (3,212); San Francisco, CA
January 9, 1997		Pacific	L 52–63	0–9 (0–1)	Bren Events Center (981); Irvine, CA
January 11, 1997		Long Beach State	L 69–82	0–10 (0–2)	Bren Events Center (1,861); Irvine, CA
January 16, 1997		at Cal Poly	L 62–79	0–11 (0–3)	Mott Gym (3,097); San Luis Obispo, CA
January 18, 1997		at UC Santa Barbara	L 55–56	0–12 (0–4)	UC Santa Barbara Events Center (3,145); Santa Barbara, CA
January 23, 1997		Nevada	W 76–74 ^{OT}	1–12 (1–4)	Bren Events Center (854); Irvine, CA
January 25, 1997		Cal State Fullerton	L 57–89	1–13 (1–5)	Bren Events Center (3,228); Irvine, CA
January 30, 1997		at Boise State	L 46–67	1–14 (1–6)	BSU Pavilion (6,112); Boise, ID
February 1, 1997		at Idaho	L 40–57	1–15 (1–7)	Cowan Spectrum (4,038); Moscow, ID
February 6, 1997		North Texas	L 74–75 ^{2OT}	1–16 (1–8)	Bren Events Center (490); Irvine, CA
February 8, 1997		New Mexico State	L 47–81	1–17 (1–9)	Bren Events Center (1,015); Irvine, CA
February 13, 1997		at Cal State Fullerton	L 69–84	1–18 (1–10)	Titan Gym (739); Fullerton, CA
February 15, 1997		at Utah State	L 47–81	1–19 (1–11)	Smith Spectrum (7,511); Logan, UT
February 20, 1997		at Long Beach State	L 63–89	1–20 (1–12)	The Pyramid (3,660); Long Beach, CA
February 22, 1997		at Pacific	L 46–96	1–21 (1–13)	Alex G. Spanos Center (5,252); Stockton, CA
February 25, 1997*		at Southern Utah	L 65–76	1–22	Centrum Arena (3,004); Cedar City, UT
February 27, 1997		UC Santa Barbara	L 71–79 ^{OT}	1–22 (1–14)	Bren Events Center (1,293); Irvine, CA
March 1, 1997		Cal Poly	L 78–84	1–25 (1–15)	Bren Events Center (2,038); Irvine, CA
*Non-conference game. ^{#}Rankings from AP Poll. (#) Tournament seedings in parentheses. All times are in Pacific Time.

== Awards and honors ==
- Brian Johnson
  - Big West All-Freshman Team
- Juma Jackson
  - Big West All-Freshman Team
- Andrew Carlson
  - Big West All-Freshman Team
