= 2005–06 UC Irvine Anteaters men's basketball team =

American college basketball season

2005–06 UC Irvine Anteaters men's basketball
- Conference: Big West Conference
- Record: 16–13 (10–4 Big West)
- Head coach: Pat Douglass (9th season)
- Home arena: Bren Events Center

2005–06 Big West men's basketball standings
	Conf.				Overall
Team	W		L	PCT	W		L	PCT
Pacific †	12	–	2	.857	24	–	8	.750
UC Irvine	10	–	4	.714	16	–	13	.552
Cal Poly	7	–	7	.500	10	–	19	.345
UC Santa Barbara	6	–	8	.429	15	–	14	.517
Cal State Fullerton	5	–	9	.357	16	–	13	.552
Cal State Northridge	4	–	10	.286	11	–	17	.393
UC Riverside	3	–	11	.214	5	–	23	.179
*Long Beach State	0	–	5	.000	0	–	12	.000
† 2006 Big West tournament winner As of April 10, 2006; *Long Beach State: 18 wins vacated due to sanctions against the program; Disputed record: Long Beach State–(18–12)(9–5); Rankings from AP poll

The 2005–06 UC Irvine Anteaters men's basketball team represented the University of California, Irvine during the 2005–06 NCAA Division I men's basketball season. The Anteaters were led by 9th year head coach Pat Douglass and played at the Bren Events Center. They were members of the Big West Conference.

== Previous season ==
The 2004–05 UC Irvine Anteaters men's basketball team finished the season with a record of 16–13 and 8–10 in Big West play.

== Roster ==
2005–06 UC Irvine Anteaters men's basketball team
Players
Coaches

Pos.	#	Name	Height	Weight	Year	Hometown
G	22	Shamar Armstrong	6 ft 3 in (1.91 m)	—	Sr
G	11	Nic Campbell	6 ft 6 in (1.98 m)	—	Jr
C	33	Darren Fells	6 ft 7 in (2.01 m)	255 lb (116 kg)	So	Fullerton, CA
G	3	Aaron Fitzgerald	6 ft 2 in (1.88 m)	—	Sr
G	12	Mike Green	6 ft 1 in (1.85 m)	—	So
F	15	Mark Kelley	6 ft 8 in (2.03 m)	—	Jr
G	40	Chad McDaniel	6 ft 0 in (1.83 m)	175 lb (79 kg)	Fr	Rosamond, CA
C	42	Adam Metelski	6 ft 10 in (2.08 m)	—	Sr
G	22	Dustin Price	6 ft 0 in (1.83 m)	—	Jr
F	21	Patrick Sanders	6 ft 6 in (1.98 m)	205 lb (93 kg)	So	Corona, CA
G	14	Ross Schraeder	6 ft 5 in (1.96 m)	—	Sr
G	20	Brandon Sievers	6 ft 5 in (1.96 m)	—	Sr
F	32	Adam Templeton	6 ft 5 in (1.96 m)	—	Fr

Head coach

Pat Douglass (Pacific)

Assistant coach(es)

Legend

- (C) Team captain
- (S) Suspended
- (I) Ineligible
- (W) Walk-on
- Injured
- Current redshirt

Roster

== Schedule ==
Date time, TV	Rank^{#}	Opponent^{#}	Result	Record	Site (attendance) city, state
Regular Season
November 10, 2005*		vs. George Mason; 2K Sports Classic	L 56–79	0–1	Lawrence Joel Veterans Memorial Coliseum (14,665); Winston-Salem, NC
November 11, 2005*		vs. Mississippi Valley State; 2K Sports Classic	W 94–40	1–1	Lawrence Joel Veterans Memorial Coliseum (14,665); Winston-Salem, NC
November 19, 2005*		at No. 13 Stanford	W 79–63	2–1	Maples Pavilion (6,523); Stanford, CA
November 22, 2005*		Santa Clara	W 78–70	3–1	Bren Events Center (2,033); Irvine, CA
November 26, 2005*		at Pepperdine	L 76–79	3–2	Firestone Fieldhouse (1,324); Malibu, CA
November 29, 2005*		Cal State Stanislaus	L 90–91	3–3	Bren Events Center (1,688); Irvine, CA
December 3, 2005*		San Jose State	W 68–58	4–3	Bren Events Center (3,730); Irvine, CA
December 17, 2005*		at Colorado	L 80–96	4–4	Coors Event Center/Conference Center (1,416); Boulder, CO
December 22, 2005*		Loyola	L 72–74	4–5	Bren Events Center (1,787); Irvine, CA
December 29, 2005*		vs. Arkansas–Monticello; Oneida Classic	L 64–81	4–6	Resch Center (3,947); Green Bay, Wisconsin
December 30, 2005*		at UW-Green Bay; Oneida Classic	L 65–77	4–7	Resch Center (3,753); Green Bay, WI
January 4, 2006*		UC Davis	L 63–66	4–8	Bren Events Center (1,051); Irvine, CA
January 7, 2006		at Cal Poly	W 69–67	5–8 (1–0)	Mott Gym (2,048); San Luis Obispo, CA
January 9, 2006		at UC Santa Barbara	W 70–66	6–8 (2–0)	UC Santa Barbara Events Center (3,572); Irvine, CA
January 13, 2006		Cal State Northridge	W 76–62	7–8 (3–0)	Bren Events Center (2,038); Irvine, CA
January 15, 2006		Pacific Tigers	W 70–61	8–8 (4–0)	Bren Events Center (1,722); Irvine, CA
January 19, 2006		at UC Riverside	W 71–61	9–8 (5–0)	Student Recreation Center (1,130); Irvine, CA
January 21, 2006		at Cal State Fullerton	W 67–59	10–8 (6–0)	Titan Gym (1,423); Fullerton, CA
January 25, 2006		Cal State Fullerton	W 83–68	11–8 (7–0)	Bren Events Center (2,880); Irvine, CA
January 28, 2006		at Long Beach State	W 73–67	12–8 (8–0)	Walter Pyramid (2,398); Long Beach, CA
February 2, 2006		at Pacific	L 52–64	12–9 (8–1)	Alex G. Spanos Center (4,720); Stockton, CA
February 4, 2006		at Cal State Northridge	W 74–57	13–9 (9–1)	Matadome (1,179); Northridge, CA
February 9, 2006		UC Santa Barbara	L 59–60	13–10 (9–2)	Bren Events Center (2,269); Irvine, CA
February 11, 2006		Cal Poly	L 58–61	13–11 (9–3)	Bren Events Center (4,500); Irvine, CA
February 15, 2006		UC Riverside	W 63–37	14–11 (10–3)	Bren Events Center (1,841); Irvine, CA
February 18, 2006*		Drake; BracketBusters	W 70–67	15–11	Bren Events Center (1,410); Irvine, CA
February 23, 2006*		at UC Davis	W 82–68	16–11	The Pavilion (1,097); Davis, CA
March 4, 2006		Long Beach	L 73–93	16–12 (10–4)	Bren Events Center (3,790); Irvine, CA
Big West Conference tournament
March 10, 2006		vs. Long Beach State; Semifinal	L 73–75	16–13	Anaheim Convention Center (3,213); Anaheim, CA
*Non-conference game. ^{#}Rankings from AP Poll. (#) Tournament seedings in parentheses. All times are in Pacific Time.

== Awards and honors ==
- Aaron Fitzgerald
  - All-Big West First Team
- Adam Templeton
  - Big West All Freshman Team
