= Camden High School (San Jose, California) =

Defunct high school in California, United States

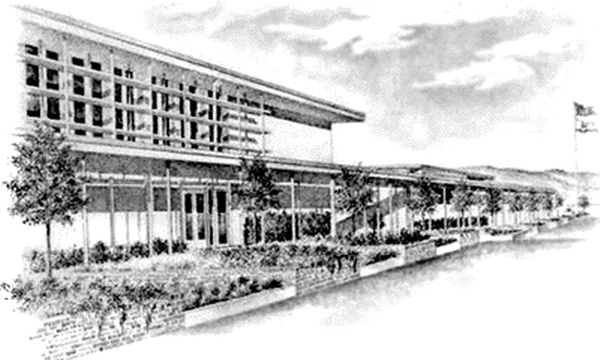
- Camden High entrance, circa 1970s

Information
- Established: 1955
- Closed: 1980

Camden High School was a high school located in the U.S. state of California. It was the second school, built in 1955, in the Campbell Union High School District, and the first of several to close in 1980. Originally located at the corner of Camden Avenue and Union Avenue in the Cambrian Park neighborhood of San Jose, much of its campus has now been sold and converted into a shopping center. Behind the center, some of the original buildings and the swimming pool remain as the Camden Community Center. The housing development of Camden Park was built on the eastern half of the original athletic fields.

Camden High School closed in 1980 in the wake of Proposition 13.

The school’s mascot was the Cougars.

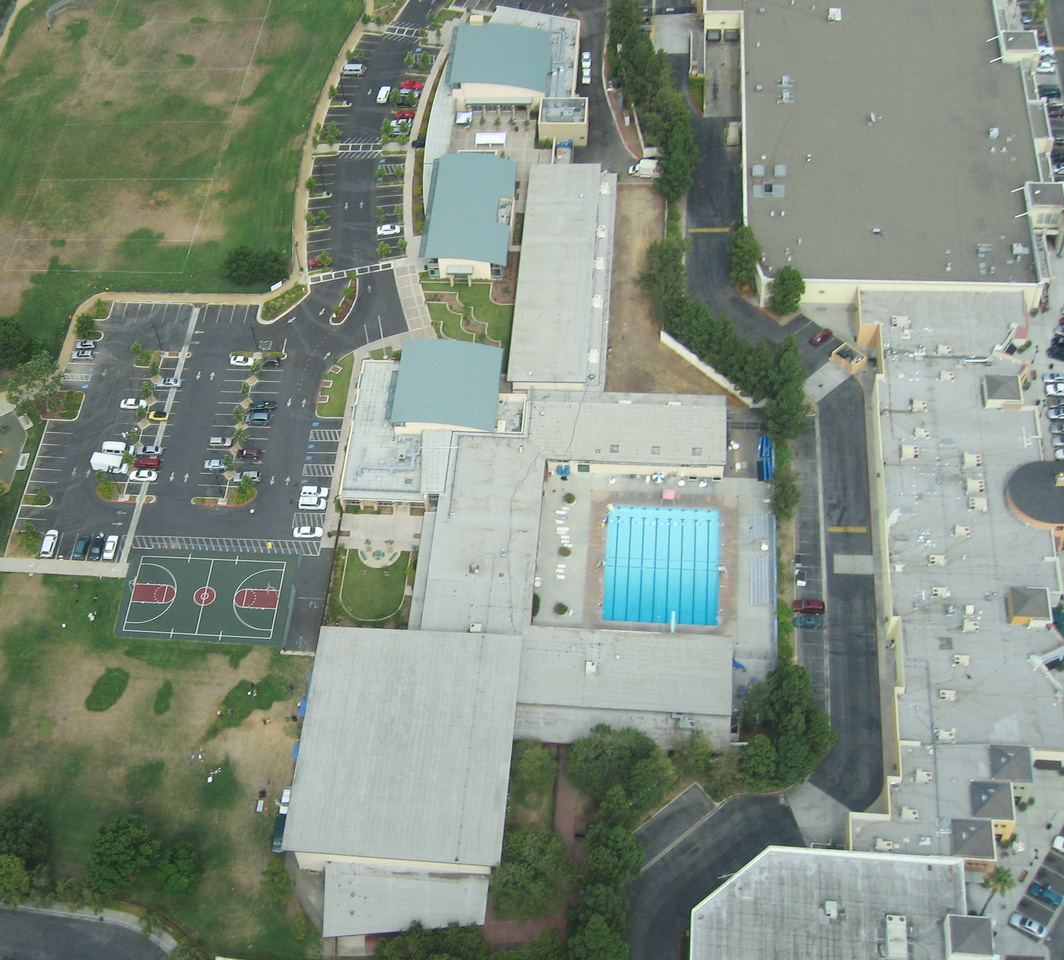
Aerial view after conversion (July 29, 2006)

== Athletics ==
Camden High was known for its track programs. Bob Woods (head coach) and Tim Rostage (sprint coach) built a program that featured Roger Martin (1971 CCS Pole Vault Champion, 15'6), Bob Paulin (1976 CCS Champion and 1977 Jr. College XC State Champion), Rex White (24-foot long jumper), Don Brown (164-foot Discus Throw), Mark Stewart (9.6 100 yard), Kevin Harding (6 ft. 7 inch high jumper), Steve Ruddy (46 ft triple jumper), Doug Searle (pole volter-San Diego State 17-6 school record holder), Ron McKee (CCS Champion-Shot -60 ft plus). Three-time 880 women's CIF California State Meet Champion Ann Reagan ran a 2:04 800 meters as a sophomore. The 1968 cross county team won three league championships that year, in the varsity, sophomore, and freshman divisions. The junior varsity team placed third in their division. Scott Blake on the varsity team was voted to the second team All Northern California cross country team. Keith Kruse and Tim Tolbert, also on the varsity team were voted honorable mention. The highlight of the season was the freshman team, which posted an undefeated record of 23–0. They won every invitational entered and posted the best time in the nation in the National Postal Meet, which rated them the number one freshman team in the country for 1968.

In the spring of 1963 Camden was honored as the school with the most athletic championships in the North Coast Athletic League, which included most of Santa Clara County. Both the football and basketball teams were champions of leagues that produced multiple professional athletes.

== Notable alumni ==
- Joe Ferguson, professional baseball player (Los Angeles Dodgers)
- Russell Ferrante, jazz pianist, member of Grammy Award-winning Yellowjackets
- Bob Gonzalez, founding member of rock band Syndicate of Sound, co-wrote the hit song "Little Girl" (1966)
- Mark Stewart, first team Football All-American U of Washington (1982), played with Minnesota Vikings
- Paul Stojanovich, television producer
- Keith Swagerty, professional basketball player
- Kurtis Townsend, basketball coach, assistant men's basketball coach at the University of Kansas,(2004–present)
- Raymond Townsend, professional basketball player
- Rich Troedson, professional baseball player (San Diego Padres)

== See also ==
- List of closed secondary schools in California
