= 2004 Big West Conference men's basketball tournament =

- Classification: Division I
- Season: 2003–04
- Teams: 8
- Site: Anaheim Convention Center; Anaheim, CA
- Champions: Pacific (3rd title)
- Winning coach: Bob Thomason (2nd title)
- MVP: Ian Boylan (Cal State Northridge)

2003–04 Big West men's basketball standings
	Conf.				Overall
Team	W		L	PCT	W		L	PCT
No. 25 Utah State	17	–	1	.944	25	–	4	.862
Pacific †	17	–	1	.944	25	–	8	.758
UC Santa Barbara	10	–	8	.556	16	–	12	.571
Idaho	9	–	9	.500	14	–	16	.467
UC Riverside	7	–	11	.389	11	–	17	.393
Cal State Northridge	7	–	11	.389	14	–	16	.467
Cal State Fullerton	7	–	11	.389	11	–	17	.393
Cal Poly	6	–	12	.333	11	–	16	.407
UC Irvine	6	–	12	.333	11	–	17	.393
Long Beach State	4	–	14	.222	6	–	21	.222
† 2004 Big West tournament winner As of April 10, 2004; Rankings from AP poll

The 2004 Big West Conference men's basketball tournament was held March 10–13 at Anaheim Convention Center in Anaheim, California.

Pacific defeated Cal State Northridge in the championship game, 75–73, to obtain the third Big West Conference men's basketball tournament championship in school history.

The Tigers earned the conference's automatic bid to the 2004 NCAA tournament as the #12 seed in the St. Louis region.

== Format ==
Eight of the ten teams in the conference participated, with UC Irvine and Long Beach State not qualifying. Teams were seeded based on regular season conference records. The top four seeds received byes, with the top two seeds receiving a second bye into the semifinal round.

== Bracket ==
First round Thursday, March 10
5	UC Riverside	72
8	Cal Poly	63
6	Cal State Northridge	80
7	Cal State Fullerton	70

Quarterfinals; Friday, March 11
4	Idaho	66
5	UC Riverside	58
6	Cal State Northridge	61
3	UC Santa Barbara	58

Semifinals; Saturday, March 12
2	Pacific	67
4	Idaho	61
6	Cal State Northridge	63
1	#22 Utah State	62

Championship; Sunday, March 13
2	Pacific	75
6	Cal State Northridge	73
