= 1996–97 Pacific Tigers men's basketball team =

American college basketball season

1996–97 Pacific Tigers men's basketball

Big West regular season co-champions Big West tournament champions

NCAA tournament, First Round
- Conference: Big West Conference
- Record: 24–6 (12–4 Big West)
- Head coach: Bob Thomason (9th season)
- Home arena: Alex G. Spanos Center

1996–97 Big West men's basketball standings
	Conf.				Overall
Team	W		L	PCT	W		L	PCT
East Division
Utah State	12	–	4	.750	20	–	9	.690
New Mexico State	12	–	4	.750	19	–	9	.679
Nevada	12	–	4	.750	21	–	10	.677
Boise State	9	–	7	.563	14	–	13	.519
Idaho	5	–	11	.313	13	–	17	.433
North Texas	5	–	11	.313	10	–	16	.385
West Division
Pacific †	12	–	4	.750	24	–	6	.800
Long Beach State	9	–	7	.563	13	–	14	.481
UC Santa Barbara	7	–	9	.438	12	–	15	.444
Cal State Fullerton	6	–	10	.375	13	–	14	.481
Cal Poly	6	–	10	.375	14	–	16	.467
UC Irvine	1	–	15	.063	1	–	25	.038
† 1997 Big West tournament winner As of April 1, 1997; Rankings from AP poll

The 1996–97 Pacific Tigers men's basketball team represented the University of the Pacific during the 1996–97 NCAA Division I men's basketball season. The Tigers were led by ninth-year head coach Bob Thomason and played their home games at the Alex G. Spanos Center in Stockton, California as members of the Big West Conference.

== Roster ==
1996–97 Pacific Tigers men's basketball team
Players	Coaches
Pos. / # / Name / Height / Weight / Year / Hometown; C / 55 / Michael Olowokandi / 7 ft 0 in (2.13 m) / 255 lb (116 kg) / Jr / Lagos, Nigeria	Head coach: Bob Thomason (Pacific); Assistant coach(es) Legend: (C) Team captain; (S) Suspended; (I) Ineligible; (W) Walk-on; Injured; Current redshirt; Roster

== Schedule and results ==
Date time, TV	Rank^{#}	Opponent^{#}	Result	Record	Site (attendance) city, state
Regular season
Nov 22, 1996*		at No. 14 Fresno State	L 71–75	0–1	Selland Arena; Fresno, California
Nov 26, 1996*		Stanislaus State	W 91–51	1–1	Alex G. Spanos Center; Stockton, California
Nov 30, 1996*		at BYU	W 80–58	2–1	Marriott Center; Provo, Utah
Dec 5, 1996*		at San Diego	W 63–57	3–1	USD Sports Center; San Diego, California
Dec 7, 1996*		at Pepperdine	W 54–52	4–1	Firestone Fieldhouse; Malibu, California
Dec 14, 1996*		Chico State	W 90–55	5–1	A.G. Spanos Center; Stockton, California
Dec 21, 1996*		Santa Clara	W 77–59	6–1	A.G. Spanos Center; Stockton, California
Dec 23, 1996*		Sacramento State	W 95–50	7–1	A.G. Spanos Center; Stockton, California
Dec 28, 1996*		vs. Georgetown	W 73–56	8–1	Halifax Metro Center; Halifax, Nova Scotia
Jan 4, 1997*		at Sacramento State	W 73–47	9–1	Hornets Nest; Sacramento, California
Jan 9, 1997		at UC Irvine	W 63–52	10–1 (1–0)	Bren Events Center; Irvine, California
Jan 11, 1997		at Cal State Fullerton	W 67–60	11–1 (2–0)	Titan Gym; Fullerton, California
Jan 16, 1997*		Idaho	W 64–54	12–1 (3–0)	A.G. Spanos Center; Stockton, California
Jan 18, 1997*		Long Beach State	W 74–57	13–1 (4–0)	A.G. Spanos Center; Stockton, California
Jan 23, 1997		Cal Poly	W 68–64	14–1 (5–0)	A.G. Spanos Center; Stockton, California
Jan 25, 1997		UC Santa Barbara	W 69–51	15–1 (6–0)	A.G. Spanos Center; Stockton, California
Jan 30, 1997*		at North Texas	W 55–52	16–1 (6–1)	Super Pit; Denton, Texas
Feb 1, 1997		at New Mexico State	L 76–80 ^{OT}	16–2 (7–1)	Pan American Center; Las Cruces, New Mexico
Feb 6, 1997		Utah State	W 77–71 ^{OT}	17–2 (8–1)	A.G. Spanos Center; Stockton, California
Feb 9, 1997		Nevada	W 63–60	18–2 (9–1)	A.G. Spanos Center; Stockton, California
Feb 13, 1997		at UC Santa Barbara	L 69–75	18–3 (9–2)	The Thunderdome; Santa Barbara, California
Feb 15, 1997		at Cal Poly	L 92–93	18–4 (9–3)	Mott Gym; San Luis Obispo, California
Feb 20, 1997		Cal State Fullerton	W 81–57	19–4 (10–3)	A.G. Spanos Center; Stockton, California
Feb 22, 1997		UC Irvine	W 96–46	20–4 (11–3)	A.G. Spanos Center; Stockton, California
Feb 27, 1997		at Boise State	W 63–53	21–4 (12–3)	BSU Pavilion; Boise, Idaho
Mar 1, 1997		Long Beach State	L 75–79	21–5 (12–4)	The Walter Pyramid; Long Beach, California
Big West tournament
Mar 7, 1997*		vs. Boise State; Quarterfinals	W 68–52	22–5	Lawlor Events Center; Reno, Nevada
Mar 8, 1997*		vs. Utah State; Semifinals	W 71–54	23–5	Lawlor Events Center; Reno, Nevada
Mar 9, 1997*		at Nevada; Championship game	W 63–55	24–5	Lawlor Events Center; Reno, Nevada
NCAA tournament
Mar 13, 1997*	(13 W)	vs. (4 W) No. 12 Saint Joseph's; First round	L 65–75	24–6	Jon M. Huntsman Center; Salt Lake City, Utah
*Non-conference game. ^{#}Rankings from AP Poll. (#) Tournament seedings in parentheses. W=West. All times are in Pacific Time.
