= Bill Stricker =

American basketball player (1948–2020)

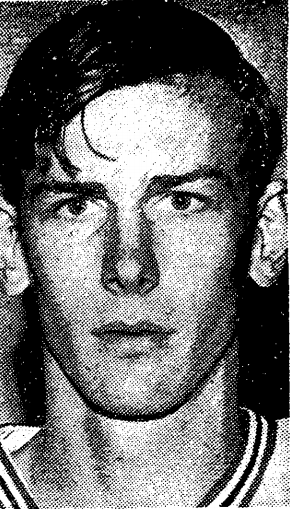
- Stricker as a member of the Portland Trail Blazers

Personal information
- Born: January 22, 1948 Alameda, California, U.S.
- Died: July 3, 2020 (aged 72) Stockton, California, U.S.
- Listed height: 6 ft 9 in (2.06 m)
- Listed weight: 210 lb (95 kg)

Career information
- High school: Quincy (Quincy, California)
- College: Pacific (1967–1970)
- NBA draft: 1970: 4th round, 54th overall pick
- Drafted by: Baltimore Bullets
- Position: Forward
- Number: 34

Career history
- 1970: Portland Trail Blazers

Career highlights
- 2× First-team All-PCAC (1969, 1970)
- Stats at NBA.com
- Stats at Basketball Reference

William Louis Stricker (January 22, 1948 – July 3, 2020) was an American professional basketball player who spent one season in the National Basketball Association (NBA). He played in just two minutes of one game with the inaugural 1970–71 Portland Trail Blazers season. Despite his lack of play, Blazers fan took a liking to Stricker and chanted "We want Stricker, We want Stricker" in blowout games. He was allowed to play in a game against the Cleveland Cavaliers, a day before being placed on waivers.

Stricker was drafted from the University of the Pacific by the Baltimore Bullets during the third round (54^{th} pick overall) of the 1970 NBA draft, but he did not sign. He was also selected by the Los Angeles Stars (who later became the Utah Stars) in the 1970 American Basketball Association draft. He signed with the Stars, but the club released him in September 1970, before the start of the regular season. Stricker's NBA rights were traded by the Bullets on October 22, 1970, to the Portland Trail Blazers in exchange for Dorie Murrey.

After his basketball career was over, Stricker had a long and successful career as a high school coach and administrator at East Union High School in Manteca, California. He coached future NBA player and coach Scott Brooks.

Stricker died on July 3, 2020, at age 72.

== Career statistics ==
Legend
GP	Games played	GS	Games started	MPG	Minutes per game
FG%	Field goal percentage	3P%	3-point field goal percentage	FT%	Free throw percentage
RPG	Rebounds per game	APG	Assists per game	SPG	Steals per game
BPG	Blocks per game	PPG	Points per game	**Bold**	Career high

=== NBA ===
==== Regular season ====
Year	Team	GP	MPG	FG%	FT%	RPG	APG	PPG
1970–71	Portland	1	2.0	.667	–	.0	.0	4.0
