= Mark Stewart (American football) =

American football player and coach (born 1959)

Personal information
- Born: October 13, 1959 (age 67); Palo Alto, California, U.S.
- Listed height: 6 ft 2 in (1.88 m)
- Listed weight: 230 lb (104 kg)

Career information
- High school: Camden (San Jose, California)
- College: Washington
- NFL draft: 1983: 5th round, 127th overall pick

Career history

Playing
- Minnesota Vikings (1983–1984); Winnipeg Blue Bombers (1985)

Coaching
- Michigan Panthers (2022) Running backs coach

Awards and highlights
- First-team All-American (1982); First-team All-Pac-10 (1982); 2× Second-team All-Pac-10 (1980, 1981)

Career NFL statistics
- Games played: 4
- Stats at Pro Football Reference

Mark Anthony Stewart. (born October 13, 1959) is an American football coach and former linebacker. He played college football at Washington from 1979 to 1982. He then played in the National Football League (NFL) for two seasons from 1983 to 1984 for the Minnesota Vikings.

== Playing career ==
A native of San Jose, California, Camden High School, sprinter 9.6 (100yd), 1977 Central Coast Section 220yd champion (21.6). A first-team All-American at outside linebacker, Stewart was one of the top defensive players to step on the gridiron at the University of Washington. In 1982, he set school records for quarterback sacks in a game with five against UCLA and fumbles caused in a season with five. Stewart registered the third-most solo tackles in a single game with 15 against the Bruins and his ten sacks that season ranks fifth in the school record books. Stewart was an academic all-district and academic all-Pac-10 selection as a senior as well as a team captain. He was drafted in the fifth round (127th overall) of the 1983 NFL draft, and played linebacker with the Minnesota Vikings for two years, where he appeared in four games.

== Coaching career ==
In 2000, he took over the Meadowdale High School football team, which was winless the previous season. Under his leadership, the Meadowdale team went to the Washington State High School playoffs in 2007, the first time since 1979. He has also coached at Mercer Island High School, Renton High School, Garfield High School, Highline High School, and Mariner High School, and Western Washington University. He currently coaches football for Everett High School in Everett, Washington.

On November 14, 2008, Mark Stewart was inducted into the University of Washington Football Hall of Fame.

In 2022 he became the running backs coach for the Michigan Panthers of the United States Football League (USFL). On March 15, 2023, the Panthers announced that Stewart would not return as the running backs coach for the 2023 season.

== See also ==
- Washington Huskies football statistical leaders
