= Raymond Townsend =

American basketball player (born 1955)

Personal information
- Born: December 20, 1955 (age 70) San Jose, California, U.S.
- Listed height: 6 ft 3 in (1.91 m)
- Listed weight: 175 lb (79 kg)

Career information
- High school: Camden (San Jose, California); Archbishop Mitty (San Jose, California)
- College: UCLA (1974–1978)
- NBA draft: 1978: 1st round, 22nd overall pick
- Drafted by: Golden State Warriors
- Playing career: 1978–1985
- Position: Point guard
- Number: 11

Career history
- 1978–1980: Golden State Warriors
- 1980–1981: Alberta Dusters
- 1981–1982: Indiana Pacers
- 1982–1983: E.C. Sirio
- 1983–1984: C.A. Monte Libano
- 1984–1985: Virtus Roma

Career highlights
- FIBA Intercontinental Cup champion (1984); NCAA champion (1975); First-team All-Pac-8 (1978)

Career NBA statistics
- Points: 745 (4.8 ppg)
- Rebounds: 157 (1.0 rpg)
- Assists: 217 (1.4 apg)
- Stats at NBA.com
- Stats at Basketball Reference

Raymond Anthony Townsend (born December 20, 1955) is an American former professional basketball player. He played three seasons in the National Basketball Association (NBA) with the Golden State Warriors and the Indiana Pacers. Townsend played college basketball with the UCLA Bruins, earning all-conference honors in the Pacific-8 (known later as the Pac-12). He was selected by the Warriors in the first round of the 1978 NBA draft, with the 22nd overall pick, and became the first Filipino-American to play in the NBA. He played at the point guard position.

== High school career ==
Townsend attended Camden High School and Archbishop Mitty High School, in San Jose, California, where he played high school basketball. As a high school senior, he averaged close to 28 points a game for the Camden High Cougars. This was prior to the 3 point shot line being regulated years later. After graduating from high school, he played college basketball at UCLA.

== College career ==
Townsend played college basketball at UCLA, with the UCLA Bruins. He was a member of the 1975 UCLA National Basketball Championship team, which was the 10th and final NCAA championship team of the school's head coach, John Wooden. He earned first-team All-Pac-8 honors as a senior, in 1978.

== Professional career ==
Townsend was selected with the last pick in the first round (22nd overall), of the 1978 NBA draft, by the Golden State Warriors. He was the first Filipino-American to play in the NBA. He concluded his NBA career in 1982, as a member of the Indiana Pacers. He also played in Italy's LBA with Banco Roma, during the 1984–85 season. With Roma, he won the 1984 edition of the FIBA Intercontinental Cup.

== Personal life ==
Townsend was born in San Jose, California. He is half-Filipino through his mother. A 1976 Sports Illustrated issue featured Townsend's father, Ray Sr., in its "Faces in the Crowd" section. He was recognized as "the oldest junior college basketball player in history." At age 39, he was the second man off the bench.

Townsend's brother, Kurtis, is an assistant coach for the Kansas Jayhawks team that won the 2008 and 2022 NCAA Championships. After his basketball playing career, Townsend worked as youth sports development coordinator in San Jose, California.

== Career statistics ==
Legend
GP	Games played	GS	Games started	MPG	Minutes per game
FG%	Field goal percentage	3P%	3-point field goal percentage	FT%	Free throw percentage
RPG	Rebounds per game	APG	Assists per game	SPG	Steals per game
BPG	Blocks per game	PPG	Points per game	**Bold**	Career high

=== NBA ===
==== Regular season ====
Year	Team	GP	GS	MPG	FG%	3P%	FT%	RPG	APG	SPG	BPG	PPG
1978–79	Golden State	65		11.9	**.439**		**.735**	.8	1.4	.4	**.1**	4.7
1979–80	Golden State	**75**		**15.5**	.406	.154	.714	**1.2**	**1.5**	**.8**	**.1**	**5.4**
1981–82	Indiana	14	0	6.8	.268	**.222**	.550	.9	.7	.2	.0	2.5
Career		154	0	13.1	.411	.171	.703	1.0	1.4	.6	.1	4.8
