= Keith Swagerty =

American basketball player and coach

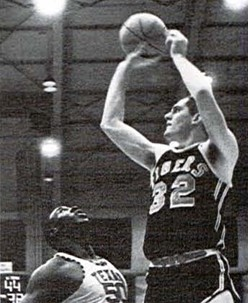
- Swagerty playing in the 1967 NCAA tournament

Personal information
- Born: October 30, 1945 (age 81) San Jose, California, U.S.
- Listed height: 6 ft 7 in (2.01 m)
- Listed weight: 235 lb (107 kg)

Career information
- High school: Camden (San Jose, California)
- College: Pacific (1964–1967)
- NBA draft: 1967: 4th round, 36th overall pick
- Drafted by: New York Knicks
- Playing career: 1967–1970
- Position: Power forward
- Number: 32, 25
- Coaching career: 1970–1980

Career history

Playing
- 1967–1968: Candy Bologna
- 1968–1969: Houston Mavericks
- 1969–1970: Kentucky Colonels

Coaching
- 1970–1974: Seattle Pacific (assistant)
- 1974–1980: Seattle Pacific

Career highlights
- 2× WCAC Player of the Year (1966, 1967); 2× First-team All-WCAC (1966, 1967); Second-team All-WCAC (1965); No. 32 retired by Pacific Tigers
- Stats at Basketball Reference

Career coaching record
- College: 87–61 (.588)

Keith Michael Swagerty (born October 30, 1945) is an American former basketball player and coach. A forward out of the University of the Pacific, he played two seasons in the American Basketball Association (ABA).

Swagerty, a 6'7 power forward out of Camden High School in San Jose, California, played for Pacific from 1964 to 1967. He was one of the most highly decorated players in Tiger history, as he was named West Coast Conference player of the year twice (1966 and 1967) and was a first team Academic All-American and an honorable mention All-American as a senior. Swagerty averaged 20.1 points and 18.4 rebounds per game for his career and led the Tigers to their first NCAA tournament in 1966 and their first NCAA tournament win in 1967, beating defending national champion Texas Western. He graduated as Pacific's all-time leading rebounder.

Following his college career, Swagerty was drafted in both the 1967 NBA draft by the New York Knicks (fourth round, 36th pick) and in the 1967 ABA Draft by the Houston Mavericks. Instead, he opted to play in Italy for Candy Bologna. He joined the ABA's Mavericks the following year (1968–69), averaging 12.7 points and 10.7 rebounds per game in 77 appearances. The next year, he played for the Kentucky Colonels, averaging 2.3 points and 2.0 rebounds in three games.

Swagerty then went into coaching, serving as head coach at Seattle Pacific University from 1974 to 1980. He amassed an 87–61 record at SPU, including a Division II NCAA tournament appearance in 1977.

He left coaching in 1980 and went into private business.

Keith Swagerty is the cousin of 1968 Olympic bronze-medalist swimmer Jane Swagerty.

== See also ==
- List of NCAA Division I men's basketball players with 30 or more rebounds in a game
