= Okay High School =

Location
- 8611 North 49th Street East; Okay, Wagoner, Oklahoma 74446; United States; 35°51′56″N 95°18′21″W

Information
- Type: Co-educational, public, secondary
- Principal: Mark Hayes
- Teaching staff: 7.69 (FTE)
- Grades: 9-12th
- Enrollment: 114 (2023-2024)
- Student to teacher ratio: 14.89
- Colors: Orange and black
- Nickname: Mustangs
- Website: http://www.okayps.org/

Okay High School is a high school located in Okay, Oklahoma, United States.

The faculty and staff at Okay are permitted to carry firearms.
