= Bob Thomason =

American basketball coach

Biographical details
- Born: March 26, 1949 (age 77); San Jose, California, U.S.

Playing career
- 1968–1971: Pacific
- Position: Shooting guard

Coaching career (HC unless noted)
- 1971–1973: Stagg HS (asst.)
- 1973–1976: Escalon HS
- 1976–1981: Turlock HS
- 1981–1985: Columbia CC
- 1985–1988: Cal State Stanislaus
- 1988–2013: Pacific

Head coaching record
- Overall: 75–49 (junior college); 489–348 (college)

Accomplishments and honors

Championships
- 4 Big West tournament (1997, 2004, 2006, 2013); 6 Big West regular season (1997, 1998, 2004–2006, 2010)

Awards
- 5× Big West Coach of the Year (1993, 1997, 2004–2006); Hugh Durham Award (2005)

Robert Lesley "Bob" Thomason Jr. (born March 26, 1949) is a retired American college basketball coach. He coached the University of the Pacific Tigers men's basketball team for 25 seasons from 1988 to 2013.

In 25 years at Pacific, Thomason has the most wins in school and Big West history with 437. He was named Big West Conference Coach of the Year five times (1992–93, 1996–97, 2003–04, 2004–05 and 2005–06).

== Early life and college playing career ==
Born in San Jose, California, Thomason graduated from Clayton Valley High School in Concord in 1967, where he played for coach Bruce Iverson. Thomson then attended the University of the Pacific in Stockton. At Pacific, Thomason played shooting guard for the Pacific Tigers from 1968 to 1971. He graduated with a degree in physical education and was an All-West Coast Conference selection as a senior after leading Pacific to the 1971 NCAA tournament and averaging 17.2 points.

== Coaching career ==
Thomason became an assistant coach at Stagg High School in Stockton in 1971. He then became head varsity basketball coach at Escalon High School in 1973 and Turlock High School in 1976. He led Turlock to the school's first conference title in 25 years.

In 1981, Thomason became head coach at Columbia College, a junior college in Sonora, California. In four seasons at Columbia, Thomason had a 75–49 record and led Columbia to its first-ever Central Valley Conference title in 1985.

Thomason moved up to the NCAA Division III ranks as head coach at Cal State Stanislaus in 1985. In three seasons at Cal State Stanislaus, Thomason had a 52–27 record and led the school to a berth in the 1987 NCAA Tournament.

Thomason returned to Pacific to be head coach in 1988 and would stay for 25 seasons. With a 437–321 record, he led Pacific to five NCAA Tournament appearances and six Big West Conference regular season championships.

== Head coaching record ==
Record table
Season	Team	Overall	Conference	Standing	Postseason
Cal State Stanislaus Warriors (Northern California Athletic Conference) (1985–1988)
1985–86	Cal State Stanislaus	15–10	4–8	6th	
1986–87	Cal State Stanislaus	20–8	9–3	T–1st	NCAA Division III Regional Final
1987–88	Cal State Stanislaus	17–9	8–4	T–2nd	
Cal State Stanislaus:		52–27	21–15		
Pacific Tigers (Big West Conference) (1988–2013)
1988–89	Pacific	7–21	3–15	9th	
1989–90	Pacific	15–14	7–11	6th	
1990–91	Pacific	14–15	9–9	3rd	
1991–92	Pacific	16–11	8–10	T–6th	
1992–93	Pacific	16–11	12–6	3rd	
1993–94	Pacific	17–14	10–8	T–5th	
1994–95	Pacific	15–12*	9–9	5th	
1995–96	Pacific	15–12	11–7	T–2nd	
1996–97	Pacific	24–6	12–4	1st (West)	NCAA Division I First Round
1997–98	Pacific	23–10	14–2	1st (West)	NIT First Round
1998–99	Pacific	14–13	9–7	T–2nd (West)	
1999–00	Pacific	11–18	6–10	4th (West)	
2000–01	Pacific	18–12	8–8	T–5th	
2001–02	Pacific	20–10	11–7	T–3rd	
2002–03	Pacific	12–16	7–11	8th	
2003–04	Pacific	25–8	17–1	T–1st	NCAA Division I Second Round
2004–05	Pacific	27–4	18–0	1st	NCAA Division I Second Round
2005–06	Pacific	24–8	12–2	1st	NCAA Division I First Round
2006–07	Pacific	12–19	5–9	T–6th	
2007–08	Pacific	21–10	11–5	4th	
2008–09	Pacific	21–13	10–6	T–2nd	CIT Semifinal
2009–10	Pacific	23–12	12–4	T–1st	CIT Runner-up
2010–11	Pacific	16–15	8–8	T–4th	
2011–12	Pacific	11–19	6–10	T–6th	
2012–13	Pacific	22–13	13–5	2nd	NCAA Division I First Round
Pacific:		437*–321	259–181		
Total:		489–348			
National champion Postseason invitational champion Conference regular season champion Conference regular season and conference tournament champion Division regular season champion Division regular season and conference tournament champion Conference tournament champion

*Includes a win by forfeit over California in 1994–95.
