= Kurtis Townsend =

Filipino-American basketball coach (born 1957)

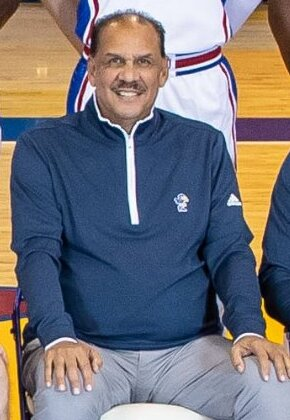
- Townsend in 2022

Current position
- Title: Assistant coach
- Team: Kansas
- Conference: Big 12

Biographical details
- Born: December 13, 1957 (age 68)

Playing career
- 1978–1980: Western Kentucky

Coaching career (HC unless noted)
- 1993–1997: California (assistant)
- 1997–1998: Eastern Kentucky (assistant)
- 1998–2001: Michigan (assistant)
- 2001–2003: USC (assistant)
- 2003–2004: Miami (FL) (assistant)
- 2004–present: Kansas (assistant)

Accomplishments and honors

Championships
- 2 NCAA Tournament (2008, 2022)

Kurtis Townsend (born December 13, 1957) is an American basketball coach who is an assistant men's basketball coach at the University of Kansas. Townsend was an assistant on the Jayhawks 2007–08 and 2021-22 NCAA national championship team.

== Playing career ==
Townsend is a 1982 graduate of Western Kentucky University, where he completed his bachelor's degree in recreation and played point guard from 1978 to 1980. The team won the 1980 Ohio Valley Conference championship and earned a bid in the 1980 NCAA Division I men's basketball tournament where they lost in the first round to Virginia Tech in an overtime game.

Prior to Western Kentucky, Townsend spent two seasons playing at Menlo Junior College in California.

After college, Townsend played one season for the Montana Golden Nuggets of the CBA.

== Coaching career ==
Townsend had coaching positions at Miami, USC, and Michigan early in his career. He joined Kansas as an assistant in 2004. In his tenure at Kansas, he has won 2 National Championships. Michigan, Eastern Kentucky and Cal. In the 2022–23 season, Townsend and head coach Bill Self were suspended for 4 games for recruiting violations.

== Personal life ==
Townsend resides in Lawrence, Kansas with his wife and his five children. He is the brother of former NBA player Raymond Townsend.
