= David Farrar (basketball) =

American basketball coach

Biographical details
- Born: April 26, 1947 (age 79); Indianapolis, Indiana, U.S.
- Education: Anderson (IN), 1969; Ball State, M.Educ. 1972

Coaching career (HC unless noted)
- 1977–1978: Southwestern Louisiana (asst.)
- 1978–1984: Mississippi State (asst.)
- 1984–1986: Western Kentucky (asst.)
- 1986–1991: Hutchinson JC
- 1991–1996: Middle Tennessee
- 1996–1997: Idaho (asst.)
- 1997–2001: Idaho
- 2005–2006: South Alabama (asst.)
- 2006–2007: Wyoming (asst.)

David Farrar (born April 26, 1947) is a former American college basketball coach. He was a head coach at the Division I level for nine seasons, five at Middle Tennessee State and four at Idaho. As head coach of Hutchinson Junior College in Kansas, Farrar won a national championship in 1988.

== Career coaching record ==
NCAA Division I

Record table
Season	Team	Overall	Conference	Standing	Postseason
Middle Tennessee State Blue Raiders (Ohio Valley) (1991–1996)
1991–92	MTSU	16–11	9–5	T-2nd	
1992–93	MTSU	10–16	5–11	7th	
1993–94	MTSU	8–19	5–11	T-6th	
1994–95	MTSU	12–15	5–11	T-8th	
1995–96	MTSU	15–12	9–7	T-4th	
Idaho:		61–73 (.455)	33–45 (.423)		
Idaho Vandals (Big West) (1997–2001)
1997–98	Idaho	15–12	9–7	T-3rd (E. div.)	
1998–99	Idaho	16–11	11–5	3rd (E. div.)	
1999–00	Idaho	12–17	6–10	3rd (E. div.)	
2000–01	Idaho	6–21	3–13	7th	
Idaho:		49–61 (.445)	29–35 (.453)		
Total:		110–134 (.451)			
