= Guillaume Yango =

French basketball player

Personal information
- Nationality: French
- Born: 31 January 1982 (age 44) Aubervilliers, France

Sport
- Sport: Basketball
Medal record
Men's basketball
Representing France
European U-18 Championship
Gold medal – first place	2000 Croatia	U-18 Team
FIBA Europe Under-20 Championship
Bronze medal – third place	2002 Lithuania	U-20 Team

Guillaume Yango (born 31 January 1982 in Aubervilliers, France) is a French basketball player who played 29 games for French Pro A league club Le Mans Sarthe Basket during the 2009–2010 season and 15 games for Paris-Levallois Basket during the 2010–2011 season. Yango began his college playing career at the College of Southern Idaho. He then helped lead the University of the Pacific Tigers to NCAA Tournament First Round wins in both 2004 and 2005.
