= Pacific Tigers men's basketball =

American college basketball team

2026–27 Pacific Tigers men's basketball team
- University: University of the Pacific
- Head coach: Dave Smart (2nd season)
- Location: Stockton, California
- Arena: Alex G. Spanos Center (capacity: 6,150 (all seater) to 8,000)
- Conference: West Coast Conference
- Nickname: Tigers
- Colors: Black and orange

NCAA Division I tournament Elite Eight
- 1967
Other NCAA Division I tournament results
Sweet Sixteen	1966, 1967, 1971
Appearances	1966, 1967, 1971, 1979, 1997, 2004, 2005, 2006, 2013

Conference tournament champions
- 1979, 1997, 2004, 2006, 2013

Conference regular-season champions
- 1933, 1936, 1947, 1966, 1967, 1971, 1979, 1997, 1998, 2004, 2005, 2006, 2010

Uniforms
Home	Away	Alternate

The Pacific Tigers men's basketball team represents the University of the Pacific, located in Stockton, California. The team is an NCAA Division I member, part of the West Coast Conference. They play their home games at the Alex G. Spanos Center and are led by head coach Dave Smart. The Tigers have appeared nine times in the NCAA Division I men's basketball tournament, most recently in 2013.

On July 15, 2013, Pacific left the Big West Conference to rejoin the West Coast Conference. It had been a charter member of the WCC since 1952, but left in 1971 to join the Pacific Coast Athletic Association, later renamed to the Big West Conference.

In late 2015, investigations into improper academic benefits being provided to basketball players began. On December 11, the school placed head coach Ron Verlin and assistant coach Dwight Young on suspension. On December 18, the school self imposed a postseason ban for 2016 and a reduction in scholarships due to the pending academic fraud investigations. On March 3, 2016, the school revealed that Verlin and Young were no longer employed by the university.

On March 15, 2016, Pacific hired 13-year NBA veteran and 1996 NBA Rookie of the Year Damon Stoudamire as head coach.

== Postseason ==
=== NCAA Tournament Results ===
The Tigers have appeared in nine NCAA Tournaments. Their combined record is 4–10.

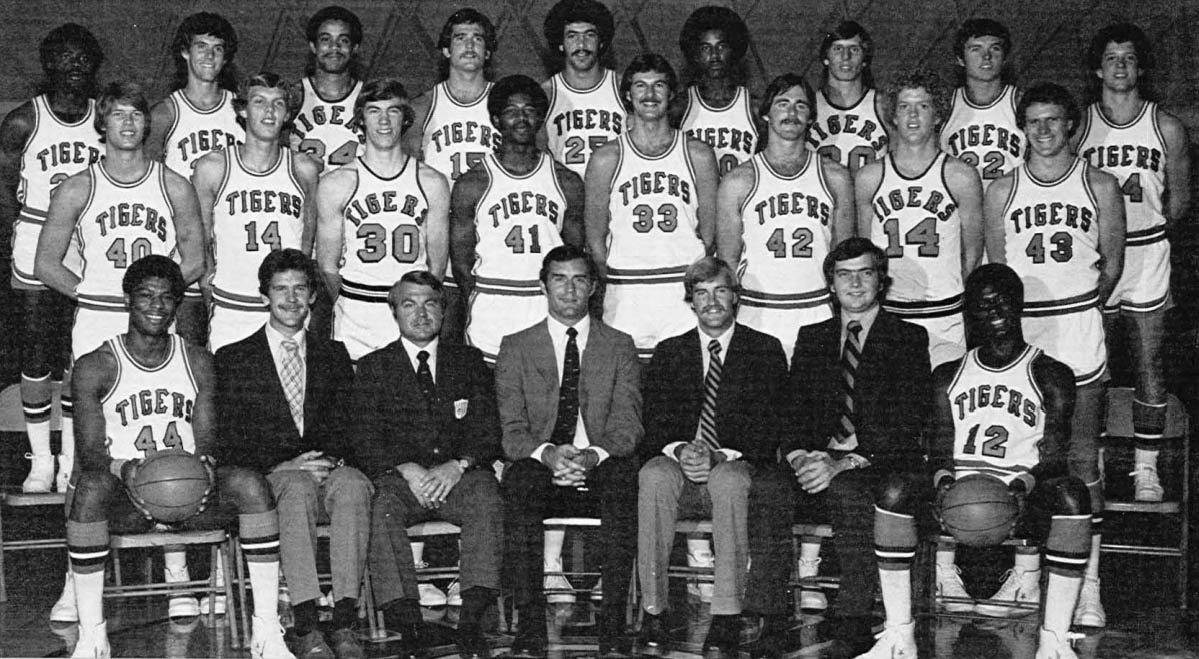
1976 Pacific roster

Year	Seed	Round	Opponent	Result
1966		Sweet Sixteen; Regional third-place game	Utah; Houston	L 51–83; L 91–102
1967		Sweet Sixteen; Elite Eight	Texas Western; UCLA	W 72–63; L 64–80
1971		Sweet Sixteen; Regional third-place game	Long Beach State; BYU	L 65–78; W 84–81
1979	6	Second round	(3) Marquette	L 48–73
1997	13	First round	(4) Saint Joseph's	L 65–75
2004	12	First round Second round	(5) Providence (4) Kansas	W 66–58; L 63–78
2005	8	First round Second round	(9) Pittsburgh (1) Washington	W 79–71; L 79–97
2006	13	First round	(4) Boston College	L 76–88 ^{2OT}
2013	15	Round of 64	(2) Miami (FL)	L 48–79

=== NIT Results ===
The Tigers have appeared in one National Invitation Tournament. Their record is 0–1.

Year	Round	Opponent	Result
1998	First round	Fresno State	L 71–73

=== CIT Results ===
The Tigers have appeared in three CollegeInsider.com Postseason Tournaments. Their combined record is 8–3.

Year	Round	Opponent	Result
2009	First round Quarterfinals; Semifinals	Portland; Idaho; Bradley	W 82–76; W 69–59; L 49–59
2010	First round Quarterfinals; Semifinals; Finals	Loyola Marymount; Northern Colorado; Appalachian State; Missouri State	W 86–76; W 63–59; W 64–56; L 65–78
2014	First round Second round Quarterfinals; Semifinals	Grand Canyon; Texas A&M–Corpus Christi; San Diego; Murray State	W 69–67; W 89–60; W 75–60; L 75–98

== Notable players ==
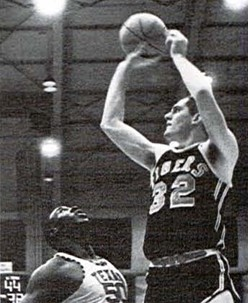
Keith Swagerty in the 1967 NCAA tournament.

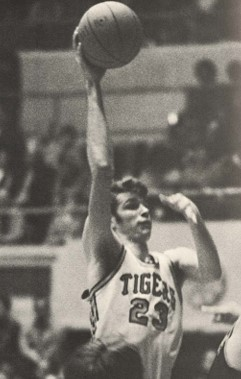
John Gianelli during the 1970–71 season.

=== Retired numbers ===
Pacific has retired five jersey numbers.

Pacific Tigers retired numbers
No.	Player	Pos.	Career	No. ret.	Ref.
5	Dell Demps	PG / SG	1988–1992	2019	
23	John Gianelli	C / PF	1969–1972	1973	
32	Keith Swagerty	F	1964–1967	1967	
44	Ron Cornelius	C	1977–1981	1982	
55	Michael Olowokandi	C	1995–1998	1998	

West Coast Conference Player of the Year awardees

- Leroy Wright (1958)
- Leroy Wright (1959)
- Keith Swagerty (1966)
- Keith Swagerty (1967)
- John Gianelli (1971)

Big West Conference Player of the Year awardees

- Ron Cornelius (1979)
- Michael Olowokandi (1998)
- Miah Davis (2004)
- David Doubley (2005)
- Christian Maråker (2006)
