= 2008–09 New Mexico State Aggies men's basketball team =

American college basketball season

2008–09 New Mexico State Aggies men's basketball
- Conference: Western Athletic Conference
- Record: 17-15 (9-7 WAC)
- Head coach: Marvin Menzies
- Assistant coaches: Mick Durham; Chris Pompey; Paul Weir
- Home arena: Pan American Center

2008–09 WAC men's basketball standings
	Conf.				Overall
Team	W		L	PCT	W		L	PCT
Utah State †	14	–	2	.875	30	–	5	.857
Nevada	11	–	5	.688	21	–	13	.618
Idaho	9	–	7	.563	17	–	16	.515
Boise State	9	–	7	.563	19	–	13	.594
New Mexico State	9	–	7	.563	17	–	15	.531
Louisiana Tech	6	–	10	.375	15	–	18	.455
San Jose State	6	–	10	.375	13	–	17	.433
Hawaii	5	–	11	.313	13	–	17	.433
Fresno State	3	–	13	.188	13	–	21	.382
† Conference tournament winner

The 2008–09 New Mexico State Aggies men's basketball team represented New Mexico State University in the 2008–09 college basketball season. This was Marvin Menzies 2nd season as head coach. The Aggies played their home games at Pan American Center and competed in the Western Athletic Conference. They finished the season 17–15, 9–7 in WAC play. They lost in the 2nd round of the 2009 WAC men's basketball tournament to end the season.

== 2008–09 Team ==
=== Roster ===
#	Name	Height	Weight (lbs.)	Position	Class	Hometown	Previous Team(s)
0	Tray Britt	6'3"	200	G	Jr.	Richmond, California	Hogan HS
1	Jahmar Young	6'5"	180	G	So.	Baltimore, Maryland	Laurinburg Prep
13	Hernst Laroche	6'1"	165	G	Fr.	Montreal, Quebec	Page-Concordia; Vanier
15	Kelly Merker	6'4"	205	F	Jr.	Santa Fe, New Mexico	Monte del Sol HS
21	Makhtar Diop	6'6"	185	G	Fr.	Dakar, Senegal	St. Jeanne d'Arc Institute
22	Jonathan Gibson	6'1"	180	G	Jr.	West Covina, California	Calvary Christian Prep
23	Terrance Joyner	6'2"		G	Fr.	Los Angeles, California	Genesis One Prep (MS)
24	Robert Lumpkins	6'7"	210	F	So.	Washington, D.C.	Kilgore College
31	Wendell McKines	6'6"	225	F	So.	Oakland, California	Richmond HS
32	Hamidu Rahman	6'11"	255	C	Fr.	Somerset, New Jersey	American Christian HS
33	Troy Gillenwater	6'8"	230	F	Fr.	Boston, Massachusetts	Stoneridge Prep
34	Aaron Gordo Castillo	6'5"	180	G	So.	Las Cruces, New Mexico	Las Cruces HS
50	Chris Gabriel	6'9"	240	C	Fr.	San Juan Capistrano, California	JSerra Catholic HS

=== Coaching staff ===
Name	Position	Year at NMSU	Alma Mater (Year)
Marvin Menzies	Head coach	2nd	UCLA (1987)
Mick Durham	Assistant coach	1st	Montana State (1979)
Chris Pompey	Assistant coach	3rd	Pittsburgh (1984)
Paul Weir	Assistant coach	2nd	York (2004)

== 2008-09 Schedule and results ==
- All times are Mountain

Date time, TV	Rank^{#}	Opponent^{#}	Result	Record	Site (attendance) city, state
Exhibition
Fri, Oct 31; 7:00pm		New Mexico Highlands	W 98-73	–	Pan American Center (1,626); Las Cruces, New Mexico
Thu, Nov 6; 7:00pm		Western New Mexico	W 110–63	–	Pan American Center (1,679); Las Cruces, New Mexico
Regular Season
Sat, Nov 15*; 1:00pm		UC Riverside	W 79-52	1-0	Pan American Center (2,481); Las Cruces, New Mexico
Tue, Nov 18*; 7:00pm		at No. 19 USC	L 60-73	1-1	Galen Center (5,618); Los Angeles, California
Fri, Nov 21*; 7:30pm		Pepperdine	W 90-66	2-1	Pan American Center (4,641); Las Cruces, New Mexico
Sun, Nov 30*; 5:00pm		at Long Beach State	L 77-82	2-2	Walter Pyramid (1,759); Long Beach, California
Wed, Dec 3*; 6:00pm		at Kansas	L 79-100	2–3	Allen Fieldhouse (16,300); Lawrence, Kansas
Sat, Dec 6*; 6:00pm		at North Texas	L 83-85	2–4	The Super Pit (3,017); Denton, Texas
Thu, Dec 11*; 7:00pm		Sacramento State; Lou Henson Classic	W 76-65	3-4	Pan American Center (5,336); Las Cruces, New Mexico
Sun, Dec 14*; 2:00pm		UTEP; Battle of I-10	W 90-78	4-4	Pan American Center (8,168); Las Cruces, New Mexico
Wed, Dec 17*; 7:00pm		Prairie View A&M	W 88-74	5-4	Pan American Center (5,098); Las Cruces, New Mexico
Sat, Dec 20*; 7:00pm		at UTEP; Battle of I-10	L 69-84	5-5	Don Haskins Center (8,513); El Paso, Texas
Tue, Dec 23*; 6:30pm		at New Mexico; Rio Grande Rivalry	L 62-76	5–6	The Pit (arena) (17,197); Albuquerque, New Mexico
Sun, Dec 28*; 1:00pm		Loyola Marymount	W 104-62	6–6	Pan American Center (4,815); Las Cruces, New Mexico
Tue, Dec 30*; 7:00pm		New Mexico; Rio Grande Rivalry	L 66-68	6-7	Pan American Center (10,285); Las Cruces, New Mexico
Sat, Jan 3; 8:00pm		at Fresno State	W 79-66	7-7 (1–0)	Save Mart Center (8,909); Fresno, California
Mon, Jan 5; 8:00pm		at San Jose State	W 75-73	8–7 (2-0)	Event Center Arena (1,341); San Jose, California
Thu, Jan 8; 7:00pm		Nevada	L 71-79	8-8 (2–1)	Pan American Center (6,314); Las Cruces, New Mexico
Sat, Jan 10; 8:00pm		Utah State	L 67-77	8-9 (2-2)	Pan American Center (6,577); Las Cruces, New Mexico
Thu, Jan 15; 7:00pm		Idaho	W 74-71	9-9 (3-2)	Pan American Center (6,821); Las Cruces, New Mexico
Thu, Jan 22; 7:00pm		at Boise State	L 84-87	9-10 (3-3)	Taco Bell Arena (3,079); Boise, Idaho
Sat, Jan 24; 7:00pm		at Idaho	L 57-67	9-11 (3-4)	Cowan Spectrum (2,129); Moscow, Idaho
Thu, Jan 29; 7:00pm		San Jose State	W 89-81	10-11 (4-4)	Pan American Center (6,194); Las Cruces, New Mexico
Sat, Jan 31; 7:00pm		Hawaii	W 82-72	11-11 (5-4)	Pan American Center (6,355); Las Cruces, New Mexico
Thu, Feb 5; 7:00pm		at No. 25 Utah State	L 59-78	11-12 (5-5)	Smith Spectrum (9,415); Logan, Utah
Sat, Feb 7; 6:00pm, ESPN2		at Nevada	W 62-60	12-12 (6-5)	Lawlor Events Center (6,786); Reno, Nevada
Sat, Feb 14; 7:00pm		Fresno State	W 79-71	13-12 (7-5)	Pan American Center (6,411); Las Cruces, New Mexico
Mon, Feb 16; 7:00pm		Louisiana Tech	W 65-63	14-12 (8-5)	Pan American Center (6,034); Las Cruces, New Mexico
Sat, Feb 21*; 7:00pm		Cal State Fullerton; ESPN BracketBusters	W 94-86	15-12 (8-5)	Pan American Center (6,371); Las Cruces, New Mexico
Thu, Feb 26; 6:00pm		at Louisiana Tech	L 71-80	15-13 (8-6)	Thomas Assembly Center (1,668); Ruston, Louisiana
Mon, Mar 2; 7:00pm		Boise State	L 92-104	15-14 (8-7)	Pan American Center (5,878); Las Cruces, New Mexico
Sat, Mar 7; 10:00pm		at Hawaii	W 70-59	16-14 (9-7)	Stan Sheriff Center (6,640); Honolulu, Hawaii
WAC tournament
Thu, Mar 12; 1:00pm		vs. Boise State; Quarterfinals	W 80-70	17-14	Lawlor Events Center (NA); Reno, Nevada
Fri, Mar 13; 7:00pm		vs. Utah State; Semifinals	L 70-71	17-15	Lawlor Events Center (NA); Reno, Nevada
*Non-conference game. ^{#}Rankings from AP Poll. (#) Tournament seedings in parentheses.

|- The attendance for the 16 home games was 99,839 which averaged 6,240 per game.

== Statistics leaders ==
- Scoring - Jahmar Young, 17.9 pts/g
- Field Goal % - Hamidu Rahman, 53.0%
- 3-point Field Goal % - Jahmar Young, 42.1%
- Free Throws - Jahmar Young, 82.4%
- Rebounds - Wendell McKines, 10.0 Reb/g
- Assists - Hernst Laroche, 139
- Blocks - Hamidu Rahman, 44
- Steals - Jonathan Gibson, Hernst Laroche, Jahmar Young; 44

== Ring of Honor Additions ==
During the Jan 31, 2009 game against Hawaii, a ceremony was held which added new Aggies to the Ring of Honor - they were Jimmy Collins, Jerry Hines, and John Williamson. Also recognized were the 1978–79 and 1998-99 teams which each appeared in the NCAA Tournament.

== Season highlights ==
- Jahmar Young was named First Team All WAC
- Jahmar Young was named WAC Player of the Week twice during the season
- Wendell McKines' rebounding average of 10.0 reb/g is a Top 10 in All-Time Aggie history
- Gordo Castillo's 3-point FG% of 44.8% is a Top 10 in All-Time Aggie history
