= 2005–06 Utah State Aggies men's basketball team =

American college basketball season

2005–06 Utah State Aggies men's basketball
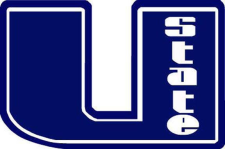

NCAA tournament, First round
- Conference: Western Athletic Conference
- East
- Record: 23–9 (11–5 WAC)
- Head coach: Stew Morrill (8th season)
- Home arena: Smith Spectrum

2005–06 WAC men's basketball standings
	Conf.				Overall
Team	W		L	PCT	W		L	PCT
No. 20 Nevada †	13	–	3	.813	27	–	6	.818
Utah State	11	–	5	.688	23	–	9	.719
Louisiana Tech	11	–	5	.688	20	–	13	.606
Hawaii	10	–	6	.625	17	–	11	.607
New Mexico State	10	–	6	.625	16	–	14	.533
Fresno State	8	–	8	.500	15	–	13	.536
Boise State	6	–	10	.375	14	–	15	.483
San Jose State	2	–	14	.125	6	–	25	.194
Idaho	1	–	15	.063	4	–	25	.138
† 2006 WAC tournament winner Rankings from AP poll

The 2005–06 Utah State Aggies men's basketball team represented Utah State University in the 2005–06 college basketball season. This was head coach Stew Morrill's 8th season at Utah State. The Aggies played their home games at the Dee Glen Smith Spectrum and were members of the Big West Conference. They finished the season 23–9, 11–5 to finish second in the regular season standings. They lost to Nevada in the championship game of the WAC tournament, but received an at-large bid to the 2006 NCAA Division I men's basketball tournament as No. 12 seed in the East region. The Aggies fell to No. 5 seed Washington in the opening round.

== Roster ==
2005–06 Utah State Aggies men's basketball team
Players
Coaches

Pos.	#	Name	Height	Weight	Year	Previous school	Hometown
G	1	Mike Daniels	6 ft 2 in (1.88 m)	190 lb (86 kg)	Jr	J. M. Hanks High School; Grayson College	El Paso, Texas
G	2	David Pak	6 ft 2 in (1.88 m)	200 lb (91 kg)	Sr	Nelles High School; Saddleback College	Orange, California
C	3	Cass Matheus	6 ft 10 in (2.08 m)	235 lb (107 kg)	Sr	Externato Madir Alix High School; South Plains College	Sao Paulo, Brazil
F	4	Nate Harris	6 ft 7 in (2.01 m)	225 lb (102 kg)	Sr	Sky View High School	Smithfield, Utah
G	5	Humphrey Jackson	5 ft 9 in (1.75 m)	160 lb (73 kg)	Fr	Woodside High School	Redwood City, California
C	11	Arvydas Vaitiekus	6 ft 11 in (2.11 m)	230 lb (104 kg)	Jr	Telšiai High School; Marshalltown Community College	Telšiai, Lithuania
G	12	Everett Morgan	6 ft 2 in (1.88 m)	185 lb (84 kg)	Jr	Laurinburg Prep; Los Angeles City College	Newark, New Jersey
G	20	Jaycee Carroll	6 ft 2 in (1.88 m)	175 lb (79 kg)	So	Evanston High School	Evanston, Wyoming
F	21	Chris Session	6 ft 6 in (1.98 m)	215 lb (98 kg)	Jr	Lancaster High School; Grayson College	Lancaster, Texas
G	23	Chris Huber	6 ft 1 in (1.85 m)	190 lb (86 kg)	Sr	Bear River High School; Dixie State College	Garland, Utah
G/F	24	Durrall Peterson	6 ft 3 in (1.91 m)	200 lb (91 kg)	Jr	Millbrook High School; Hutchinson Community College	Raleigh, North Carolina
F	25	Nick Hammer	6 ft 6 in (1.98 m)	205 lb (93 kg)	So	Snow Canyon High School; Dixie State College	St. George, Utah
F	30	Chaz Spicer	6 ft 7 in (2.01 m)	215 lb (98 kg)	Jr	Lawrence North High School; Kankakee Community College	Indianapolis, Indiana
C	31	Steve Cobbley	6 ft 9 in (2.06 m)	230 lb (104 kg)	So	Highland High School; North Idaho College	Pocatello, Idaho
C	44	Nate Bendall	6 ft 8 in (2.03 m)	250 lb (113 kg)	Fr	Skyline High School	Salt Lake City, Utah

Head coach

- Stew Morrill

Assistant coach(es)

Legend

- (C) Team captain
- (S) Suspended
- (I) Ineligible
- (W) Walk-on
- Injured
- Current redshirt

Roster

== Schedule and results ==
Date time, TV	Rank^{#}	Opponent^{#}	Result	Record	Site (attendance) city, state
Exhibition
Nov 4, 2005*; 7:05 p.m.		Occidental	W 66–38		Dee Glen Smith Spectrum (6,934); Logan, Utah
Nov 12, 2005*; 7:05 p.m.		EA Sports	L 60–67		Dee Glen Smith Spectrum (7,217); Logan, Utah
Non-conference regular season
Nov 19, 2005*; 6:05 p.m.		Oral Roberts	W 72–67 ^{OT}	1–0	Mabee Center (6,941); Tulsa, Oklahoma
Nov 21, 2005*; 6:05 p.m.		at Middle Tennessee	L 59–60	1–1	Murphy Center (4,223); Murfreesboro, Tennessee
Nov 26, 2005*; 7:05 p.m.		Lewis & Clark	W 102–65	2–1	Dee Glen Smith Spectrum (6,438); Logan, Utah
Nov 30, 2005*; 7:05 p.m.		at Utah	L 66–67	2–2	Jon M. Huntsman Center (10,798); Salt Lake City, Utah
Dec 5, 2005*; 7:05 p.m.		Middle Tennessee State	W 79–61	3–2	Dee Glen Smith Spectrum (7,422); Logan, Utah
Dec 10, 2005*; 7:35 p.m.		at Weber State	W 69–60	4–2	Dee Events Center (6,866); Ogden, Utah
Dec 17, 2005; 4:05 p.m.		at Hawaii	L 59–69	4–3 (0–1)	Stan Sheriff Center (6,884); Honolulu, Hawaii
Dec 20, 2005*; 7:05 p.m.		Oral Roberts	W 65–64	5–3	Dee Glen Smith Spectrum (6,686); Logan, Utah
Dec 22, 2005*; 7:05 p.m.		BYU	W 91–80	6–3	Dee Glen Smith Spectrum (9,251); Logan, Utah
Dec 29, 2005*; 8:05 p.m.		Arkansas–Little Rock; Gossner Classic	W 76–44	7–3	Dee Glen Smith Spectrum (8,217); Logan, Utah
Dec 30, 2005*; 8:05 p.m.		Binghamton; Gossner Classic	W 81–47	8–3	Dee Glen Smith Spectrum (8,129); Logan, Utah
WAC regular season
Jan 5, 2006; 8:05 p.m.		at San Jose State	W 67–56	9–3 (1–1)	Event Center Arena (1,042); San Jose, California
Jan 7, 2006; 8:05 p.m.		at Fresno State	L 96–99	9–4 (1–2)	Save Mart Center (10,324); Fresno, California
Jan 12, 2006; 7:05 p.m.		Boise State	W 75–69	10–4 (2–2)	Dee Glen Smith Spectrum (8,573); Logan, Utah
Jan 14, 2006; 7:05 p.m.		Idaho	W 83–58	11–4 (3–2)	Dee Glen Smith Spectrum (8,442); Logan, Utah
Jan 18, 2006; 7:05 p.m.		Louisiana Tech	W 64–55	12–4 (4–2)	Dee Glen Smith Spectrum (8,755); Logan, Utah
Jan 23, 2006; 10:05 p.m.		at Nevada	W 59–53	13–4 (5–2)	Lawlor Events Center (5,713); Reno, Nevada
Jan 27, 2006*; 7:05 p.m.		South Dakota State	W 72–51	14–4	Dee Glen Smith Spectrum (8,896); Logan, Utah
Jan 30, 2006; 10:05 p.m.		Hawaii	W 63–52	15–4 (6–2)	Dee Glen Smith Spectrum (9,540); Logan, Utah
Feb 2, 2006; 7:05 p.m.		at New Mexico State	L 86–93	15–5 (6–3)	Pan American Center (7,139); Las Cruces, New Mexico
Feb 4, 2006; 2:05 p.m.		at Louisiana Tech	W 63–62	16–5 (7–3)	Thomas Assembly Center (3,320); Ruston, Louisiana
Feb 11, 2006; 7:05 p.m.		New Mexico State	L 77–83	16–6 (7–4)	Dee Glen Smith Spectrum (10,270); Logan, Utah
Feb 15, 2006; 8:05 p.m.		at Idaho	W 80–42	17–6 (8–4)	Cowan Spectrum (1,152); Moscow, Idaho
Feb 18, 2006*; 8:05 p.m.		Northwestern State; ESPN BracketBusters	W 66–63	18–6	Dee Glen Smith Spectrum (7,740); Logan, Utah
Feb 23, 2006; 7:35 p.m.		at Boise State	W 64–62	19–6 (9–4)	Taco Bell Arena (3,932); Boise, Idaho
Feb 25, 2006; 7:05 p.m.		Nevada	L 57–75	19–7 (9–5)	Dee Glen Smith Spectrum (10,270); Logan, Utah
Mar 2, 2006; 7:05 p.m.		Fresno State	W 87–77	20–7 (10–5)	Dee Glen Smith Spectrum (7,740); Logan, Utah
Mar 4, 2006; 7:05 p.m.		San Jose State	W 61–58	21–7 (11–5)	Dee Glen Smith Spectrum (9,428); Logan, Utah
WAC tournament
Mar 9, 2006*; 3:30 p.m.	(2)	vs. (7) San Jose State; Quarterfinals	W 76–69	22–7	Lawlor Events Center (6,011); Reno, Nevada
Mar 10, 2006*; 6:00 p.m.	(2)	vs. (3) Louisiana Tech; Semifinals	W 68–64	23–7	Lawlor Events Center (8,216); Reno, Nevada
Mar 11, 2006*; 7:00 p.m.	(2)	at (1) No. 21 Nevada; Championship game	L 63–70 ^{OT}	23–8	Lawlor Events Center (9,436); Reno, Nevada
NCAA tournament
Mar 16, 2006*; 7:55 p.m., CBS	(12 DC)	vs. (5 DC) No. 17 Washington; First round	L 61–75	23–9	Cox Arena (9,891); San Diego, California
*Non-conference game. ^{#}Rankings from AP poll. (#) Tournament seedings in parentheses. DC=Washington, D.C.. All times are in Mountain.
