= 2004–05 Utah State Aggies men's basketball team =

American college basketball season

2004–05 Utah State Aggies men's basketball
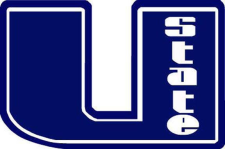

Big West tournament champions

NCAA tournament, First Round
- Conference: Big West Conference
- East
- Record: 24–8 (13–5 Big West)
- Head coach: Stew Morrill (7th season)
- Home arena: Smith Spectrum

2004–05 Big West men's basketball standings
	Conf.				Overall
Team	W		L	PCT	W		L	PCT
No. 22 Pacific	18	–	0	1.000	27	–	4	.871
Utah State †	13	–	5	.722	24	–	8	.750
Cal State Fullerton	12	–	6	.667	21	–	11	.656
Cal State Northridge	12	–	6	.667	18	–	13	.581
UC Irvine	8	–	10	.444	16	–	13	.552
Long Beach State	7	–	11	.389	10	–	20	.333
UC Santa Barbara	7	–	11	.389	11	–	18	.379
Idaho	6	–	12	.333	8	–	22	.267
UC Riverside	4	–	14	.222	9	–	19	.321
Cal Poly	3	–	15	.167	5	–	22	.185
† 2005 Big West tournament winner As of April 10, 2005; Rankings from AP poll

The 2004–05 Utah State Aggies men's basketball team represented Utah State University in the 2004–05 college basketball season. This was head coach Stew Morrill's 7th season at Utah State. The Aggies played their home games at the Dee Glen Smith Spectrum and were members of the Big West Conference. They finished the season 24–8, 13–5 to finish second in the regular season standings. They won the Big West tournament to earn an automatic bid to the 2005 NCAA Division I men's basketball tournament as No. 14 seed in the Midwest region. The Aggies fell to No. 3 seed Arizona in the opening round.

== Roster ==
2004–05 Utah State Aggies men's basketball team
Players	Coaches
Pos. / # / Name / Height / Weight / Year / Hometown; F / 32 / Spencer Nelson / 6 ft 8 in (2.03 m) / 225 lb (102 kg) / Sr / Pocatello, Idaho	Head coach: Stew Morrill; Assistant coach(es) Legend: (C) Team captain; (S) Suspended; (I) Ineligible; (W) Walk-on; Injured; Current redshirt; Roster

== Schedule and results ==
Date time, TV	Rank^{#}	Opponent^{#}	Result	Record	Site (attendance) city, state
Non-conference regular season
Nov 18, 2004*		vs. Georgia Southern	W 71–61	1–0	Carlson Center (3,509); Fairbanks, Alaska
Nov 20, 2004*		vs. Central Florida	L 52–55	1–1	Carlson Center (1,947); Fairbanks, Alaska
Nov 21, 2004*		vs. Northwestern	W 64–57	2–1	Carlson Center (809); Fairbanks, Alaska
Nov 27, 2004*		UC Davis	W 81–55	3–1	Dee Glen Smith Spectrum (6,084); Logan, Utah
Dec 1, 2004*		BYU	W 71–57	4–1	Dee Glen Smith Spectrum (9,230); Logan, Utah
Dec 4, 2004*		Utah	W 71–45	5–1	Dee Glen Smith Spectrum (9,779); Logan, Utah
Dec 7, 2004*		at Purdue-Fort Wayne	L 59–64	5–2	Allen County War Memorial Coliseum (1,870); Fort Wayne, Indiana
Dec 11, 2004*		Weber State	W 73–56	6–2	Dee Glen Smith Spectrum (7,733); Logan, Utah
Dec 18, 2004*		at BYU	W 84–62	7–2	Marriott Center (11,610); Provo, Utah
Big West regular season
Dec 23, 2004		at Idaho	L 62–69	7–3 (0–1)	Cowan Spectrum (1,350); Moscow, Idaho
Dec 29, 2004*		South Carolina State	W 82–60	8–3	Dee Glen Smith Spectrum (7,124); Logan, Utah
Dec 30, 2004*		Loyola Marymount	W 87–42	9–3	Dee Glen Smith Spectrum (7,538); Logan, Utah
Jan 6, 2005		UC Santa Barbara	W 80–70	10–3 (1–1)	Dee Glen Smith Spectrum (4,877); Logan, Utah
Mar 4, 2005		Idaho	W 65–43	22–7 (13–5)	Dee Glen Smith Spectrum (10,270); Logan, Utah
Big West tournament
Mar 11, 2005*		vs. Cal State Fullerton; Semifinals	W 84–77	23–7	Honda Center (5,563); San Jose, California
Mar 12, 2005*		vs. No. 18 Pacific; Championship game	W 65–52	24–7	Honda Center (5,229); San Jose, California
NCAA tournament
Mar 17, 2005*	(14 MW)	vs. (3 MW) No. 9 Arizona; First round	L 53–66	24–8	Taco Bell Arena (11,894); Boise, Idaho
*Non-conference game. ^{#}Rankings from AP poll. (#) Tournament seedings in parentheses. MW=Midwest. All times are in Mountain.
