= 2002–03 Utah State Aggies men's basketball team =

American college basketball season

2002–03 Utah State Aggies men's basketball
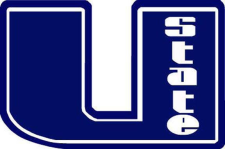

Big West tournament champions

NCAA tournament, first round
- Conference: Big West Conference
- East
- Record: 24–9 (12–6 Big West)
- Head coach: Stew Morrill (5th season)
- Assistant coach: Randy Rahe (5th season)
- Home arena: Smith Spectrum

2002–03 Big West men's basketball standings
	Conf.				Overall
Team	W		L	PCT	W		L	PCT
UC Santa Barbara	14	–	4	.778	18	–	14	.563
UC Irvine	13	–	5	.722	20	–	9	.690
Utah State†	12	–	6	.667	24	–	9	.727
Cal Poly	10	–	8	.556	16	–	14	.533
Idaho	9	–	9	.500	13	–	15	.464
Cal State Fullerton	8	–	10	.444	10	–	19	.345
Cal State Northridge	8	–	10	.444	14	–	15	.483
Pacific	7	–	11	.389	12	–	16	.429
UC Riverside	5	–	13	.278	6	–	18	.250
Long Beach State	4	–	14	.222	5	–	22	.185
† 2003 Big West tournament winner As of April 10, 2003; Rankings from AP poll

The 2002–03 Utah State Aggies men's basketball team represented Utah State University in the 2002–03 college basketball season. This was head coach Stew Morrill's 5th season at Utah State. The Aggies played their home games at the Dee Glen Smith Spectrum and were members of the Big West Conference. They finished the season 24–9, 12–6 to finish third in the regular season standings. They won the Big West tournament to earn an automatic bid to the 2003 NCAA Division I men's basketball tournament as No. 15 seed in the West Region. The Aggies fell to No. 2 seed and eventual National runner-up Kansas in the opening round.

== Roster ==
2002–03 Utah State Aggies men's basketball team
Players
Coaches

Pos.	#	Name	Height	Weight	Year	Hometown
F	2	Desmond Penigar	6 ft 7 in (2.01 m)	245 lb (111 kg)	Sr	Upland, California
F	32	Spencer Nelson	6 ft 8 in (2.03 m)	225 lb (102 kg)	So	Pocatello, Idaho

Head coach

- Stew Morrill

Assistant coach(es)

Legend

- (C) Team captain
- (S) Suspended
- (I) Ineligible
- (W) Walk-on
- Injured
- Current redshirt

Roster

== Schedule and results ==
Date time, TV	Rank^{#}	Opponent^{#}	Result	Record	Site (attendance) city, state
Non-conference regular season
Nov 23, 2002*		at Illinois State	W 68–53	1–0	Redbird Arena (7,948); Normal, Illinois
Dec 14, 2002*		at BYU	L 56–66	5–2	Marriott Center (14,734); Provo, Utah
Dec 17, 2002*		Utah	W 59–54	6–2	Dee Glen Smith Spectrum (9,148); Logan, Utah
Big West regular season
Mar 8, 2003		Pacific	W 75–70	21–8 (12–6)	Dee Glen Smith Spectrum (7,712); Logan, Utah
Big West tournament
Mar 13, 2003*		vs. Cal State Fullerton; Quarterfinals	W 89–83 ^{OT}	22–8	Honda Center (3,265); Anaheim, California
Mar 14, 2003*		vs. UC Irvine; Semifinals	W 62–55	23–8	Honda Center (4,136); Anaheim, California
Mar 15, 2003*		vs. Cal Poly; Championship game	W 57–54	24–8	Honda Center (3,228); Anaheim, California
NCAA tournament
Mar 20, 2003*; CBS	(15 MW)	vs. (2 MW) No. 6 Kansas; First round	L 61–64	24–9	Ford Center (18,462); Oklahoma City, Oklahoma
*Non-conference game. ^{#}Rankings from AP poll. (#) Tournament seedings in parentheses. W=West. All times are in Mountain.
