= 2000–01 UC Irvine Anteaters men's basketball team =

American college basketball season

2000–01 UC Irvine Anteaters men's basketball

Big West Regular Season Champions

NIT First round vs. Tulsa, L 71–75
- Conference: Big West Conference
- Record: 25–5 (15–1 Big West)
- Head coach: Pat Douglass (4th season)
- Home arena: Bren Events Center

2000–01 Big West men's basketball standings
	Conf.				Overall
Team	W		L	PCT	W		L	PCT
UC Irvine	15	–	1	.938	25	–	5	.833
Utah State †	13	–	3	.813	28	–	6	.824
Long Beach State	10	–	6	.625	18	–	13	.581
UC Santa Barbara	10	–	6	.625	18	–	13	.581
Pacific	8	–	8	.500	18	–	12	.600
Boise State	8	–	8	.500	17	–	14	.548
Cal Poly	3	–	13	.188	9	–	19	.321
Idaho	3	–	13	.188	6	–	21	.222
Cal State Fullerton	3	–	13	.188	5	–	23	.179
† 2001 Big West tournament winner

The 2000–01 UC Irvine Anteaters men's basketball team represented the University of California, Irvine during the 2000–01 NCAA Division I men's basketball season. The Anteaters were led by fourth year head coach Pat Douglass and played their home games at the Bren Events Center. They were members of the Big West Conference. They finished the season with a school record 25–5 and 15–1 in Big West play to win the Big West regular season championship. They advanced to the Big West Conference tournament where they lost to the Pacific Tigers. The Anteaters earned a bid to the National Invitation Tournament where they lost in the first round to the Tulsa Golden Hurricane.

== Roster ==
2001–02 UC Irvine Anteaters men's basketball team
Players
Coaches

Pos.	#	Name	Height	Weight	Year	Hometown
G		Aras Baskauskas	6 ft 4 in (1.93 m)	—	So	Santa Monica, California
C	4	J.R. Christ	6 ft 9 in (2.06 m)	238 lb (108 kg)	Sr	St. Louis, Missouri
G	5	Jerry Green	6 ft 3 in (1.91 m)	190 lb (86 kg)	Sr	Pomona, California
F		Jordan Harris	6 ft 5 in (1.96 m)	—	Jr	Phoenix, Arizona
G		Mike Hood	6 ft 4 in (1.93 m)	—	Jr	Santa Monica, California
G		Jeff Hufford	6 ft 4 in (1.93 m)	—	Fr	Los Angeles, California
C		Dave Korfman	7 ft 2 in (2.18 m)	—	Sr	Boulder City, Nevada
G		Jesse Obrand	6 ft 2 in (1.88 m)	—	So	Laguna Beach, California
F	40	Matt Okoro	6 ft 7 in (2.01 m)	210 lb (95 kg)	So	Buena Park, California
C		Adam Parada	7 ft 0 in (2.13 m)	265 lb (120 kg)	So	Alta Loma, California
F		Stanislav Zuzak	6 ft 11 in (2.11 m)	—	So

Head coach

Pat Douglass (Pacific)

Assistant coach(es)

Legend

- (C) Team captain
- (S) Suspended
- (I) Ineligible
- (W) Walk-on
- Injured
- Current redshirt

Roster

=== Schedule ===
Date time, TV	Rank^{#}	Opponent^{#}	Result	Record	Site (attendance) city, state
Non-Conference Season
November 17, 2000*		Howard	W 71–47	1–0	Bren Events Center (1,189); Irvine, California
November 21, 2000*		Loyola Marymount	W 62–57	2–0	Bren Events Center (1,018); Irvine, California
November 29, 2000*		San Diego	L 60–63	2–1	Bren Events Center (1,247); Irvine, California
December 2, 2000*		California	W 56–52	3–1	Bren Events Center (4,904); Irvine, California
December 13, 2000*		UC San Diego	W 97–60	4–1	Bren Events Center (1,244); Irvine, California
December 16, 2000*		at #17 UCLA	L 60–65	4–2	Pauley Pavilion (6,974); Los Angeles, California
December 19, 2000*		Belmont	W 84–74	5–2	Bren Events Center (907); Irvine, California
December 23, 2000*		at UC Riverside	W 80–72	6–2	Student Recreation Center (1,844); Riverside, California
December 28, 2000*		at Washington	W 56–55	7–2	Bank of America Arena (5,166); Seattle, Washington
January 3, 2001*		at Saint Mary's	W 57–37	8–2	McKeon Pavilion (485); Moraga, California
Conference Season
January 6, 2001		at Pacific	W 85–80	9–2 (1–0)	Alex G. Spanos Center (4,014); Stockton, California
January 11, 2001		Idaho	W 65–61	10–2 (2–0)	Bren Events Center (2,074); Irvine, California
January 13, 2001		UC Santa Barbara	W 80–56	11–2 (3–0)	Bren Events Center (3,084); Irvine, California
January 18, 2001		Boise State	W 76–71	12–2 (4–0)	Bren Events Center (2,492); Irvine, California
January 20, 2001		at Cal State Fullerton	W 62–54	13–2 (5–0)	Titan Gym (1,182); Fullerton, California
January 25, 2001		at UC Santa Barbara	W 66–56	14–2 (6–0)	UC Santa Barbara Events Center (2,022); Santa Barbara, California
January 27, 2001		at Cal Poly	W 75–63	15–2 (7–0)	Mott Athletic Center (2,517); San Luis Obispo, California
January 31, 2001		Utah State	W 56–51	16–2 (8–0)	Bren Events Center (5,231); Irvine, California
February 3, 2001		at Long Beach State	W 58–57	17–2 (9–0)	Walter Pyramid (2,956); Long Beach, California
February 8, 2001		at Utah State	L 52–67	17–3 (9–1)	Smith Spectrum (10,114); Logan, Utah
February 10, 2001		at Boise State	W 89–87 ^{OT}	18–3 (10–1)	BSU Pavilion (8,327); Boise, ID
February 15, 2001		Pacific	W 69–60	19–3 (11–1)	Bren Events Center (2,421); Irvine, California
February 17, 2001		Cal Poly	W 93–89	20–3 (12–1)	Bren Events Center (3,218); Irvine, California
February 22, 2001		Long Beach State	W 83–78	21–3 (13–1)	Bren Events Center (5,300); Irvine, California
February 24, 2001*		UC Riverside	W 74–66	22–3	Bren Events Center (3,763); Irvine, California
March 1, 2001		Cal State Fullerton	W 58–55	23–3 (14–1)	Bren Events Center (4,054); Irvine, California
March 3, 2001		at Idaho	W 84–80 ^{OT}	24–3 (15–1)	Cowan Spectrum (2,115); Moscow, Idaho
Big West tournament
March 8, 2001		vs. Cal Poly; Quarterfinals	W 71–66	25–3	Anaheim Convention Center (2,976); Anaheim, California
March 9, 2001		vs. Pacific; Semifinals	L 58–74	25–4	Anaheim Convention Center (4,268); Anaheim, California
NIT
March 14, 2001*		at Tulsa; First round	L 71–74	25–5	Reynolds Center (5,748); Tulsa, Oklahoma
*Non-conference game. ^{#}Rankings from AP Poll. (#) Tournament seedings in parentheses. All times are in Pacific Time.
