= 2005–06 Nevada Wolf Pack men's basketball team =

American college basketball season

2005–06 Nevada Wolf Pack men's basketball

WAC Regular season champion WAC tournament champion

NCAA tournament, first round
- Conference: Western Athletic Conference

Ranking
- Coaches: No. 25
- AP: No. 20
- Record: 27–6 (13–3 WAC)
- Head coach: Mark Fox (2nd season)
- Home arena: Lawlor Events Center

2005–06 WAC men's basketball standings
	Conf.				Overall
Team	W		L	PCT	W		L	PCT
No. 20 Nevada †	13	–	3	.813	27	–	6	.818
Utah State	11	–	5	.688	23	–	9	.719
Louisiana Tech	11	–	5	.688	20	–	13	.606
Hawaii	10	–	6	.625	17	–	11	.607
New Mexico State	10	–	6	.625	16	–	14	.533
Fresno State	8	–	8	.500	15	–	13	.536
Boise State	6	–	10	.375	14	–	15	.483
San Jose State	2	–	14	.125	6	–	25	.194
Idaho	1	–	15	.063	4	–	25	.138
† 2006 WAC tournament winner Rankings from AP poll

The 2005–06 Nevada Wolf Pack men's basketball team represented the University of Nevada, Reno during the 2005–06 NCAA Division I men's basketball season. The Wolf Pack, led by head coach Mark Fox, played their home games at the Lawlor Events Center on their campus in Reno, Nevada as members of the Western Athletic Conference (WAC).

After finishing atop the conference regular season standings, Nevada won the WAC tournament to receive an automatic bid to the NCAA tournament as No. 5 seed in the Midwest Region. The Wolf Pack were upset by No. 12 seed Montana in the opening round. The team finished with a record of 27–6 (13–3 WAC).

== Roster ==
2005–06 Nevada Wolf Pack men's basketball team
Players
Coaches

Pos.	#	Name	Height	Weight	Year	Previous school	Hometown
G	11	Ramon Sessions	6 ft 3 in (1.91 m)	190 lb (86 kg)	So	Myrtle Beach	Myrtle Beach, SC
F	22	Nick Fazekas	6 ft 11 in (2.11 m)	235 lb (107 kg)	Jr	Ralston Valley	Arvada, CO

Head coach

- Trent Johnson (Boise State)

Assistant coach(es)

Legend

- (C) Team captain
- (S) Suspended
- (I) Ineligible
- (W) Walk-on
- Injured
- Current redshirt

Roster

== Schedule and results ==
Date time, TV	Rank^{#}	Opponent^{#}	Result	Record	Site city, state
Exhibition
Nov 3, 2005*; 7:05 p.m.		Rockhurst	W 77–69		Lawlor Events Center; Reno, Nevada
Nov 12, 2005*; 7:05 p.m.		Humboldt State	W 78–72		Lawlor Events Center; Reno, Nevada
Regular season
Nov 19, 2005*; 7:05 p.m.	No. 22	Sacramento State	W 82–74	1–0	Lawlor Events Center (7,685); Reno, Nevada
Nov 23, 2005*; 4:05 p.m.	No. 22	at Vermont	W 77–62	2–0	Roy L. Patrick Gymnasium (3,266); Burlington, Vermont
Nov 26, 2005*; 7:30 p.m.	No. 22	at UNLV	W 68–61	3–0	Thomas & Mack Center (14,602); Las Vegas, Nevada
Dec 1, 2005*; 6:00 p.m., ESPN2	No. 20	at Kansas	W 72–70	4–0	Allen Fieldhouse (16,300); Lawrence, Kansas
Dec 3, 2005*; 7:00 p.m.	No. 20	at Pacific	W 77–70	5–0	Alex G. Spanos Center (4,521); Stockton, California
Dec 7, 2005*; 7:05 p.m.	No. 17	UC Davis	W 78–51	6–0	Lawlor Events Center (9,852); Reno, Nevada
Dec 10, 2005*; 2:30 p.m., KCAL	No. 17	vs. No. 16 UCLA; John R. Wooden Classic	L 56–67	6–1	Arrowhead Pond of Anaheim (12,109); Anaheim, California
Dec 13, 2005*; 7:05 p.m.	No. 20	Seattle Pacific	W 83–57	7–1	Lawlor Events Center (6,422); Reno, Nevada
Dec 21, 2005*; 7:05 p.m.	No. 20	Georgia	W 68–62	8–1	Lawlor Events Center (9,845); Reno, Nevada
Dec 27, 2005*; 5:05 p.m.	No. 20	Norfolk State	W 56–46	9–1	Lawlor Events Center (5,949); Reno, Nevada
Dec 29, 2005*; 7:05 p.m.	No. 20	Louisiana	W 65–58	10–1	Lawlor Events Center (8,571); Reno, Nevada
Dec 31, 2005*; 4:05 p.m.	No. 20	at Saint Mary's	L 80–89	10–2	McKeon Pavilion (2,420); Moraga, California
Jan 5, 2006; 10:05 p.m.		at Hawaii	L 69–73 ^{OT}	10–3 (0–1)	Stan Sheriff Center (7,776); Honolulu, Hawaii
Jan 7, 2006; 3:00 p.m.		at San Jose State	W 70–44	11–3 (1–1)	Event Center Arena (1,566); San Jose, California
Jan 12, 2006; 7:05 p.m.		Idaho	W 70–44	12–3 (2–1)	Lawlor Events Center (7,557); Reno, Nevada
Jan 14, 2006; 7:05 p.m.		Boise State	W 81–67	13–3 (3–1)	Lawlor Events Center (8,757); Reno, Nevada
Jan 18, 2006; 7:00 p.m.		at Fresno State	L 77–87	13–4 (3–2)	Save Mart Center (10,736); Fresno, California
Jan 23, 2006; 9:05 p.m.		Utah State	L 53–59	13–5 (3–3)	Lawlor Events Center (5,713); Reno, Nevada
Jan 26, 2006; 6:30 p.m.		at Boise State	W 82–79	14–5 (4–3)	Taco Bell Arena (4,563); Boise, Idaho
Jan 28, 2006; 7:05 p.m.		Hawaii	W 73–55	15–5 (5–3)	Lawlor Events Center (11,485); Reno, Nevada
Feb 2, 2006; 7:00 p.m.		at Louisiana Tech	W 65–53	16–5 (6–3)	Thomas Assembly Center (4,683); Ruston, Louisiana
Feb 4, 2006; 6:05 p.m.		at New Mexico State	W 90–81	17–5 (7–3)	Pan American Center (8,112); Las Cruces, New Mexico
Feb 9, 2006; 7:05 p.m.		New Mexico State	W 85–63	18–5 (8–3)	Lawlor Events Center (9,736); Reno, Nevada
Feb 13, 2006; 9:05 p.m.		Louisiana Tech	W 50–49	19–5 (9–3)	Lawlor Events Center (6,621); Reno, Nevada
Feb 17, 2006*; 9:00 p.m.		Akron; ESPN BracketBusters	W 88–61	20–5	Lawlor Events Center (9,156); Reno, Nevada
Feb 20, 2006; 1:00 p.m.		at Idaho	W 74–68	21–5 (10–3)	Cowan Spectrum (1,017); Moscow, Idaho
Feb 25, 2006; 7:05 p.m.		at Utah State	W 75–57	22–5 (11–3)	Dee Glen Smith Spectrum (10,270); Logan, Utah
Mar 2, 2006; 7:05 p.m.		San Jose State	W 83–60	23–5 (12–3)	Lawlor Events Center (8,020); Reno, Nevada
Mar 4, 2006; 7:05 p.m.		Fresno State	W 74–60	24–5 (13–3)	Lawlor Events Center (10,457); Reno, Nevada
WAC tournament
Mar 9, 2006*; 6:00 p.m.	(1) No. 21	(8) Idaho; Quarterfinals	W 68–55	25–5	Lawlor Events Center (7,196); Reno, Nevada
Mar 10, 2006*; 8:30 p.m.	(1) No. 21	(5) New Mexico State; Semifinals	W 70–59	26–5	Lawlor Events Center (8,216); Reno, Nevada
Mar 11, 2006*; 6:00 p.m.	(1) No. 21	(2) Utah State; Championship game	W 70–63 ^{OT}	27–5	Lawlor Events Center (9,436); Reno, Nevada
NCAA tournament
Mar 16, 2006*; 12:00 p.m.	(5 MW) No. 20	vs. (12 MW) Montana; First Round	L 79–87	27–6	Jon M. Huntsman Center (15,122); Salt Lake City, Utah
*Non-conference game. (#) Tournament seedings in parentheses. MW=Midwest. All times are in Pacific Time.

== Awards and honors ==
- Nick Fazekas – WAC Player of the Year
- Mark Fox – WAC Coach of the Year
