= 2008–09 Idaho Vandals men's basketball team =

American college basketball season

2008–09 Idaho Vandals men's basketball

CIT Quarterfinal vs. Pacific, L, 59–69
- Conference: Western Athletic Conference
- Record: 17–16 (9–7 WAC)
- Head coach: Don Verlin (1st season)
- Home arena: Cowan Spectrum

2008–09 WAC men's basketball standings
	Conf.				Overall
Team	W		L	PCT	W		L	PCT
Utah State †	14	–	2	.875	30	–	5	.857
Nevada	11	–	5	.688	21	–	13	.618
Idaho	9	–	7	.563	17	–	16	.515
Boise State	9	–	7	.563	19	–	13	.594
New Mexico State	9	–	7	.563	17	–	15	.531
Louisiana Tech	6	–	10	.375	15	–	18	.455
San Jose State	6	–	10	.375	13	–	17	.433
Hawaii	5	–	11	.313	13	–	17	.433
Fresno State	3	–	13	.188	13	–	21	.382
† Conference tournament winner

The 2008–09 Idaho Vandals men's basketball team represented the University of Idaho during the 2008–09 NCAA Division I men's basketball season. Members of the Western Athletic Conference (WAC), the Vandals were led by first-year head coach Don Verlin and played their home games on campus at Cowan Spectrum in Moscow, Idaho.

The Vandals were 16–14 overall in the regular season and 9–7 in conference play, tied for third in the standings. They met sixth-seed Louisiana Tech in the quarterfinals of the conference tournament in Reno and lost by eight points. Invited to the inaugural edition of the 16-team CollegeInsider.com Tournament (CIT), Idaho advanced to the quarterfinals.

Verlin was hired in March; he was previously an assistant at Utah State under Stew Morrill.

== Postseason result ==
Date time, TV	Opponent	Result	Record	Site (attendance) city, state
WAC Tournament
Thu, March 12; 8:30 pm	at (6) Louisiana Tech; Quarterfinal	L 62–70	16–15	Lawlor Events Center; Reno, Nevada
CollegeInsider.com Tournament
Wed, March 18*; 8:05 pm	Drake; First round	W 69–67	17–15	Cowan Spectrum; Moscow, Idaho
Mon, March 23*; 7:00 pm	at Pacific; Quarterfinal	L 59–69	17–16	Spanos Center; Stockton, California
*Non-conference game. ^{#}Rankings from AP poll. (#) Tournament seedings in parentheses. All times are in Pacific time.
