= 2002–03 UC Irvine Anteaters men's basketball team =

American college basketball season

2002–03 UC Irvine Anteaters men's basketball
- Conference: Big West Conference
- Record: 20–9 (13–5 Big West)
- Head coach: Pat Douglass (6th season)
- Home arena: Bren Events Center

2002–03 Big West men's basketball standings
	Conf.				Overall
Team	W		L	PCT	W		L	PCT
UC Santa Barbara	14	–	4	.778	18	–	14	.563
UC Irvine	13	–	5	.722	20	–	9	.690
Utah State†	12	–	6	.667	24	–	9	.727
Cal Poly	10	–	8	.556	16	–	14	.533
Idaho	9	–	9	.500	13	–	15	.464
Cal State Fullerton	8	–	10	.444	10	–	19	.345
Cal State Northridge	8	–	10	.444	14	–	15	.483
Pacific	7	–	11	.389	12	–	16	.429
UC Riverside	5	–	13	.278	6	–	18	.250
Long Beach State	4	–	14	.222	5	–	22	.185
† 2003 Big West tournament winner As of April 10, 2003; Rankings from AP poll

The 2002–03 UC Irvine Anteaters men's basketball team represented the University of California, Irvine during the 2002–03 NCAA Division I men's basketball season. The Anteaters were led by 6th year head coach Pat Douglass and played at the Bren Events Center. They were members of the Big West Conference.

== Previous season ==
The 2001–02 UC Irvine Anteaters men's basketball team finished the season with a record of 21–11 and 13–5 in Big West play.

== Roster ==
2002–03 UC Irvine Anteaters men's basketball team
Players
Coaches

Pos.	#	Name	Height	Weight	Year	Hometown
G		Aras Baskauskas	6 ft 4 in (1.93 m)	—	Jr
G	11	Nic Campbell	6 ft 6 in (1.98 m)	—	Fr
C		Ryan Codi	7 ft 1 in (2.16 m)	—	Fr
G		Mike Efevberha	6 ft 5 in (1.96 m)	195 lb (88 kg)	Fr	Pomona, CA
F	3	Greg Ethington	6 ft 8 in (2.03 m)	235 lb (107 kg)	So
G	10	Jeff Gloger	6 ft 5 in (1.96 m)	—	Fr
F		Jordan Harris	6 ft 5 in (1.96 m)	—	Sr
G		Mike Hood	6 ft 4 in (1.93 m)	—	Sr
F	40	Matt Okoro	6 ft 7 in (2.01 m)	210 lb (95 kg)	Jr
C		Adam Parada	7 ft 0 in (2.13 m)	265 lb (120 kg)	Jr	Alta Loma, CA
G		DeVaughn Peace	6 ft 3 in (1.91 m)	—	Fr
G	14	Ross Schraeder	6 ft 5 in (1.96 m)	—	Fr
G		J.R. Stephens	5 ft 11 in (1.8 m)	—	So
F		Stanislav Zuzak	6 ft 11 in (2.11 m)	—	Jr

Head coach

Pat Douglass (Pacific)

Assistant coach(es)

Legend

- (C) Team captain
- (S) Suspended
- (I) Ineligible
- (W) Walk-on
- Injured
- Current redshirt

Roster

== Schedule ==
Date time, TV	Rank^{#}	Opponent^{#}	Result	Record	Site (attendance) city, state
Non-Conference Season
November 22, 2002*		at No. 7 Oklahoma; Sooner invitational	L 65–87	0–1	Lloyd Noble Center (10,685); Norman, OK
November 23, 2002*		vs. Western Michigan; Sooner invitational	L 62–73	0–2	Lloyd Noble Center (10,734); Norman, OK
November 30, 2002*		at Pepperdine	W 74–69	1–2	Firestone Fieldhouse (1,866); Malibu, CA
December 4, 2002*		Loyola Marymount	W 81–66	2–2	Bren Events Center (2,010); Irvine, CA
December 7, 2002*		Pomona-Pitzer	W 91–23	3–2	Bren Events Center (3,525); Irvine, CA
December 19, 2002*		at No. 17 Stanford	L 57–84	3–3	Maples Pavilion (3,013); Stanford, CA
December 22, 2002*		Saint Mary's	W 62–50	4–3	McKeon Pavilion (1,355); Moraga, CA
December 28, 2002*		IPFW	W 96–79	5–3	Bren Events Center (1,997); Irvine, CA
December 30, 2002*		Florida Atlantic	W 87–70	6–3	Bren Events Center (1,444); Irvine, CA
Conference Season
January 4, 2003		at Long Beach State	W 69–52	7–3 (1–0)	The Pyramid (2,084); Long Beach, CA
January 8, 2003		at Cal State Fullerton	L 65–66 ^{OT}	7–4 (1–1)	Titan Gym (1,208); Fullerton, CA
January 11, 2003		at UC Riverside	W 81–77	8–4 (2–1)	Student Recreation Center (1,226); Riverside, CA
January 15, 2003		Utah State	W 75–73 ^{OT}	9–4 (3–1)	Bren Events Center (3,205); Irvine, CA
January 18, 2003		Idaho	W 58–45	10–4 (4–1)	Bren Events Center (2,987); Irvine, CA
January 23, 2003		at Pacific	W 66–62	11–4 (5–1)	Alex G. Spanos Center (3,203); Stockton, CA
January 25, 2003		at Cal State Northridge	L 63–69	11–5 (5–2)	Matadome (1,268); Northridge, CA
January 30, 2003		UC Santa Barbara	L 54–70	11–6 (5–3)	Bren Events Center (2,570); Irvine, CA
February 1, 2003		Cal Poly	L 68–74	11–7 (5–4)	Bren Events Center (2,173); Irvine, CA
February 5, 2003		UC Riverside	W 78–61	12–7 (6–4)	Bren Events Center (1,496); Irvine, CA
February 8, 2003		Cal State Fullerton	W 72–52	13–7 (7–4)	Bren Events Center (3,179); Irvine, CA
February 13, 2003		at Utah State	W 59–58	14–7 (8–4)	Smith Spectrum (8,041); Logan, UT
February 15, 2003		Idaho	W 65–52	15–7 (9–4)	Cowan Spectrum (2,720); Moscow, ID
February 20, 2003		Cal State Northridge	W 64–57	16–7 (10–4)	Bren Events Center (2,289); Irvine, CA
February 22, 2003		Pacific	W 78–73 ^{OT}	17–7 (11–4)	Bren Events Center (2,331); Irvine, CA
February 27, 2003		at Cal Poly	W 68–62	18–7 (12–4)	Mott Gym (3,032); Irvine, CA
March 1, 2003		at UC Santa Barbara	L 51–67	18–8 (12–5)	UC Santa Barbara Events Center (5,014); Santa Barbara, CA
March 8, 2003		Long Beach State	W 95–60	19–8 (12–6)	Bren Events Center (5,000); Irvine, CA
Big West Conference tournament
March 13, 2003; 7:00 pm		vs. Cal State Northridge; Quarterfinal	W 70–64 ^{OT}	20–8	Anaheim Convention Center (3,265); Anaheim, CA
March 14, 2003; 9:30 pm		vs. Utah State; Semifinal	L 55–62	20–9	Anaheim Convention Center (4,136); Anaheim, CA
*Non-conference game. ^{#}Rankings from AP Poll. (#) Tournament seedings in parentheses. All times are in Pacific Time.

== Awards and honors ==
- Adam Parada
  - All-Big West Second Team
- Jeff Gloger
  - Big West All Freshman Team
