= 2005–06 Idaho Vandals men's basketball team =

American college basketball season

2005–06 Idaho Vandals men's basketball
- Conference: Western Athletic Conference
- Record: 4–25 (1–15 WAC)
- Head coach: Leonard Perry (5th season)
- Assistant coaches: George Pfeifer; Leroy Washington
- Home arena: Cowan Spectrum

2005–06 WAC men's basketball standings
	Conf.				Overall
Team	W		L	PCT	W		L	PCT
No. 20 Nevada †	13	–	3	.813	27	–	6	.818
Utah State	11	–	5	.688	23	–	9	.719
Louisiana Tech	11	–	5	.688	20	–	13	.606
Hawaii	10	–	6	.625	17	–	11	.607
New Mexico State	10	–	6	.625	16	–	14	.533
Fresno State	8	–	8	.500	15	–	13	.536
Boise State	6	–	10	.375	14	–	15	.483
San Jose State	2	–	14	.125	6	–	25	.194
Idaho	1	–	15	.063	4	–	25	.138
† 2006 WAC tournament winner Rankings from AP poll

The 2005–06 Idaho Vandals men's basketball team represented the University of Idaho during the 2005–06 NCAA Division I men's basketball season. New members of the Western Athletic Conference (WAC), the Vandals were led by fifth-year head coach Leonard Perry and played their home games on campus at Cowan Spectrum in Moscow, Idaho.

The Vandals were 4–24 overall in the regular season and 1–15 in conference play, eighth in the standings.

They drew top seed and host Nevada in the quarterfinal of the conference tournament in Reno and lost to the Wolf Pack by thirteen points. Perry was fired shortly after the game, and assistant George Pfeifer was promoted to head coach in late March.

== Schedule and results ==
Date time, TV	Opponent	Result	Record	Site (attendance) city, state
Exhibition
Wed, Nov 9; 7:05 pm	at Carroll	W 73–63		Cowan Spectrum; Moscow, ID
Regular season
Fri, Nov 18*; 5:00 pm, KAYU	at No. 9 Gonzaga	L 60–69	0–1	McCarthey Athletic Center (6,000); Spokane, WA
Tue, Nov 22*; 7:00 pm	at No. 25 Washington	L 67–90	0–2	Alaska Airlines Arena (8,665); Seattle, WA
Sat, Nov 26*; 2:00 pm	at Washington State	L 37–63	0–3	Beasley Coliseum (2,135); Pullman, WA
Wed, Nov 30*; 8:00 pm	Eastern Washington	L 55–68	0–4	Cowan Spectrum (2,695); Moscow, ID
Sat, Dec 3*; 2:05 pm	Southern Utah	W 75–60	1–4	Cowan Spectrum (1,012); Moscow, ID
Wed, Dec 7*; 7:05 pm	Idaho State	L 71–78	1–5	Cowan Spectrum (1,269); Moscow, ID
Sat, Dec 10*; 8:05 pm	Portland State	L 59–61	1–6	Cowan Spectrum (1,521); Moscow, ID
Sat, Dec 17*; 2:05 pm	Eastern Oregon	W 77–58	2–6	Cowan Spectrum (1,052); Moscow, ID
Wed, Dec 21*; 7:05 pm	North Dakota State	W 76–71	3–6	Cowan Spectrum (1,012); Moscow, ID
Fri, Dec 30*; 7:00 pm	Portland State	L 48–81	3–7	Cowan Spectrum (957); Moscow, ID
Thu, Jan 5; 7:05 pm	New Mexico State	L 52–62	3–8 (0–1)	Cowan Spectrum (1,032); Moscow, ID
Sat, Jan 7; 2:05 pm	Louisiana Tech	L 61–66	3–9 (0–2)	Cowan Spectrum (1,062); Moscow, ID
Thu, Jan 12; 7:05 pm	at Nevada	L 44–70	3–10 (0–3)	Lawlor Events Center (7,557); Reno, Nevada
Sat, Jan 14; 6:05 pm	at Utah State	L 58–83	3–11 (0–4)	Dee Glen Smith Spectrum (8,442); Logan, Utah
Sat, Jan 21; 2:05 pm	San Jose State	L 53–57	3–12 (0–5)	Cowan Spectrum (1,375); Moscow, ID
Tue, Jan 24*; 5:00 pm	at North Dakota State	L 64–71	3–13	Bison Sports Arena (3,541); Fargo, ND
Sat, Jan 28; 2:05 pm	Boise State	L 68–82	3–14 (0–6)	Cowan Spectrum (2,716); Moscow, ID
Mon, Jan 30; 7:05 pm	at Fresno State	L 54–89	3–15 (0–7)	Save Mart Center (10,412); Fresno, CA
Thu, Feb 2; 9:05 pm	at Hawaii	L 61–81	3–16 (0–8)	Stan Sheriff Center (6,346); Honolulu, HI
Mon, Feb 6; 7:05 pm	Fresno State	W 72–61	4–16 (1–8)	Cowan Spectrum (1,012); Moscow, ID
Thu, Feb 9; 7:05 pm	at San Jose State	L 61–72	4–17 (1–9)	Event Center Arena (1,173); San Jose, CA
Wed, Feb 15; 7:05 pm	Utah State	L 42–80	4–18 (1–10)	Cowan Spectrum (1,152); Moscow, ID
Sat, Feb 18*; 6:05 pm	at Montana State	L 69–79	4–19	Worthington Arena (3,417); Bozeman, MT
Mon, Feb 20; 1:00 pm	Nevada	L 68–74	4–20 (1–11)	Cowan Spectrum (1,017); Moscow, ID
Wed, Feb 22; 7:05 pm	Hawaii	L 66–70	4–21 (1–12)	Cowan Spectrum (1,166); Moscow, ID
Sat, Feb 25; 6:05 pm	at New Mexico State	L 50–66	4–22 (1–13)	Pan American Center (7,150); Las Cruces, NM
Mon, Feb 27; 5:00 pm	at Louisiana Tech	L 49–74	4–23 (1–14)	Thomas Assembly Center (2,815); Ruston, LA
Sat, Mar 4; 1:00 pm	at Boise State	L 80–85	4–24 (1–15)	Taco Bell Arena (4,006); Boise, ID
WAC Tournament
Thu, March 9; 6:00 pm	at (1) No. 21 Nevada; First round	L 55–68	4–25	Lawlor Events Center (7,196); Reno, Nevada
*Non-conference game. (#) Tournament seedings in parentheses. All times are in Pacific time.
