= 2004–05 UC Irvine Anteaters men's basketball team =

American college basketball season

2004–05 UC Irvine Anteaters men's basketball
- Conference: Big West Conference
- Record: 16–13 (8–10 Big West)
- Head coach: Pat Douglass (8th season)
- Home arena: Bren Events Center

2004–05 Big West men's basketball standings
	Conf.				Overall
Team	W		L	PCT	W		L	PCT
No. 22 Pacific	18	–	0	1.000	27	–	4	.871
Utah State †	13	–	5	.722	24	–	8	.750
Cal State Fullerton	12	–	6	.667	21	–	11	.656
Cal State Northridge	12	–	6	.667	18	–	13	.581
UC Irvine	8	–	10	.444	16	–	13	.552
Long Beach State	7	–	11	.389	10	–	20	.333
UC Santa Barbara	7	–	11	.389	11	–	18	.379
Idaho	6	–	12	.333	8	–	22	.267
UC Riverside	4	–	14	.222	9	–	19	.321
Cal Poly	3	–	15	.167	5	–	22	.185
† 2005 Big West tournament winner As of April 10, 2005; Rankings from AP poll

The 2004–05 UC Irvine Anteaters men's basketball team represented the University of California, Irvine during the 2004–05 NCAA Division I men's basketball season. The Anteaters were led by 8th year head coach Pat Douglass and played at the Bren Events Center. They were members of the Big West Conference.

== Previous season ==
The 2003–04 UC Irvine Anteaters men's basketball team finished the season with a record of 11–17 and 6–12 in Big West play.

== Roster ==
2004–05 UC Irvine Anteaters men's basketball team
Players
Coaches

Pos.	#	Name	Height	Weight	Year	Hometown
G	22	Shamar Armstrong	6 ft 3 in (1.91 m)	—	Jr
G	20	Davis Baker	6 ft 4 in (1.93 m)	—	Fr
C	32	Andrew Bruckner	6 ft 9 in (2.06 m)	—	So
G	11	Nic Campbell	6 ft 6 in (1.98 m)	—	So
F	3	Greg Ethington	6 ft 8 in (2.03 m)	235 lb (107 kg)	Sr
C	33	Darren Fells	6 ft 7 in (2.01 m)	255 lb (116 kg)	Fr	Fullerton, CA
G	3	Aaron Fitzgerald	6 ft 2 in (1.88 m)	—	Jr
G	10	Jeff Gloger	6 ft 5 in (1.96 m)	—	Jr
C	34	Adam Metelski	6 ft 10 in (2.08 m)	—	Jr
F	24	Patrick Sanders	6 ft 6 in (1.98 m)	205 lb (93 kg)	Fr	Corona, CA
G	14	Ross Schraeder	6 ft 5 in (1.96 m)	—	Jr

Head coach

Pat Douglass (Pacific)

Assistant coach(es)

Legend

- (C) Team captain
- (S) Suspended
- (I) Ineligible
- (W) Walk-on
- Injured
- Current redshirt

Roster

== Schedule ==
Date time, TV	Rank^{#}	Opponent^{#}	Result	Record	Site (attendance) city, state
Regular Season
November 19, 2004*		Cal State Dominguez Hills	W 106–69	1–0	Bren Events Center (1,487); Irvine, CA
November 22, 2004*		at USC	L 70–90	1–1	Los Angeles Memorial Sports Arena (3,515); Los Angeles, CA
November 27, 2004*		at UCLA	L 65–76	1–2	Pauley Pavilion (6,247); Los Angeles, CA
December 4, 2004*		Sacramento State	W 81–69	2–2	Bren Events Center (3,778); Irvine, CA
December 14, 2004*		at Santa Clara	W 70–58	3–2	Leavey Center (1,729); Santa Clara, CA
December 17, 2004*		at San Jose State	W 76–55	4–2	Event Center Arena (1,078); San Jose, CA
December 21, 2004*		New Mexico State	W 75–62	5–2	Bren Events Center (1,692); Irvine, CA
December 28, 2004		at Cal Poly	W 85–75	6–2 (1–0)	Mott Gym (2,328); San Luis Obispo, CA
December 30, 2004		at UC Santa Barbara	L 45–62	6–3 (1–1)	UC Santa Barbara Events Center (1,161); Santa Barbara, CA
January 6, 2005		Cal State Northridge	L 52–66	6–4 (1–2)	Bren Events Center (1,486); Irvine, CA
January 8, 2005		Pacific	L 65–67	6–5 (1–3)	Bren Events Center (1,853); Irvine, CA
January 13, 2005		at UC Riverside	L 55–68	6–6 (1–4)	UC Riverside Student Recreation Center (853); Riverside, CA
January 15, 2005		at Cal State Fullerton	W 97–81	7–6 (2–4)	Titan Gym (1,472); Fullerton, CA
January 20, 2005		Long Beach State	W 78–58	8–6 (3–4)	Bren Events Center (2,619); Irvine, CA
January 24, 2005*		at UC Davis	W 71–64	9–6	The Pavilion (1,491); Davis, CA
January 27, 2005		Utah State	L 52–77	9–7 (3–5)	Bren Events Center (2,831); Irvine, CA
January 29, 2005		Idaho	W 71–70	10–7 (4–5)	Bren Events Center (2,143); Irvine, CA
February 3, 2005		at Pacific	L 61–71	10–8 (4–6)	Alex G. Spanos Center (4,587); Stockton, CA
February 5, 2005		at Cal State Northridge	L 60–79	10–9 (4–7)	Matadome (1,522); Northridge, CA
February 10, 2005		Cal State Fullerton	L 70–71	10–10 (4–8)	Bren Events Center (1,895); Irvine, CA
February 12, 2005		UC Riverside	W 56–53	11–10 (5–8)	Bren Events Center (3,123); Irvine, CA
February 17, 2005		at Long Beach State	W 56–53	11–11 (5–9)	Walter Pyramid (1,460); Long Beach, CA
February 19, 2005*		UC Davis	W 77–66	12–11	Bren Events Center (1,744); Irvine, CA
February 24, 2005		at Idaho	W 67–62 ^{OT}	13–11 (6–9)	Cowan Spectrum (1,156); Irvine, CA
February 26, 2005		at Utah State	L 49–87	13–12 (6–10)	Smith Spectrum (10,270); Logan, UT
March 3, 2005		UC Santa Barbara	W 72–63	14–12 (7–10)	Bren Events Center (2,187); Irvine, CA
March 5, 2005		Cal Poly	W 79–49	15–12 (8–10)	Bren Events Center (2,046); Irvine, CA
Big West Conference tournament
March 9, 2005		vs. Idaho; First Round	W 80–67	16–12	Anaheim Convention Center (1,704); Anaheim, CA
March 10, 2005		vs. Cal State Northridge; Quarterfinal	L 56–72	16–13	Anaheim Convention Center (2,923); Anaheim, CA
*Non-conference game. ^{#}Rankings from AP Poll. (#) Tournament seedings in parentheses. All times are in Pacific Time.
