= 2000–01 Idaho Vandals men's basketball team =

American college basketball season

2000–01 Idaho Vandals men's basketball
- Conference: Big West Conference
- Record: 6–21 (3–13 Big West)
- Head coach: David Farrar (4th season)
- Assistant coaches: Joe Harge; Chris Jans (2nd season)
- Home arena: Kibbie Dome (Cowan Spectrum)

2000–01 Big West men's basketball standings
	Conf.				Overall
Team	W		L	PCT	W		L	PCT
UC Irvine	15	–	1	.938	25	–	5	.833
Utah State †	13	–	3	.813	28	–	6	.824
Long Beach State	10	–	6	.625	18	–	13	.581
UC Santa Barbara	10	–	6	.625	18	–	13	.581
Pacific	8	–	8	.500	18	–	12	.600
Boise State	8	–	8	.500	17	–	14	.548
Cal Poly	3	–	13	.188	9	–	19	.321
Idaho	3	–	13	.188	6	–	21	.222
Cal State Fullerton	3	–	13	.188	5	–	23	.179
† 2001 Big West tournament winner

The 2000–01 Idaho Vandals men's basketball team represented the University of Idaho during the 2000–01 NCAA Division I men's basketball season. Members of the Big West Conference, the Vandals were led by fourth-year head coach David Farrar and played their home games on campus at the Kibbie Dome in Moscow, Idaho.

The Vandals were 6–21 overall and 3–13 in conference play, in a three-way tie for seventh (last). They lost the tiebreaker for the final berth in the conference tournament to Cal Poly. Idaho had qualified for the tourney in the previous three seasons, but was the sole team not to participate this year.

The Cowan Spectrum (configuration inside the Kibbie Dome) debuted late in the season with a victory over rival Boise State, which drew a season-high attendance of 5,184 on Saturday, February 17.

Farrar was fired by athletic director Mike Bohn days after the regular season ended; he was succeeded by alumnus Leonard Perry, an assistant at Iowa State, regular season champions of the Big 12 Conference.
