= 2000–01 Utah State Aggies men's basketball team =

American college basketball season

2000–01 Utah State Aggies men's basketball
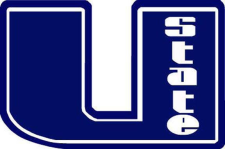

Big West tournament champions

NCAA tournament, second round
- Conference: Big West Conference
- East
- Record: 28–6 (13–3 Big West)
- Head coach: Stew Morrill (3rd season)
- Assistant coach: Randy Rahe (3rd season)
- Home arena: Smith Spectrum

2000–01 Big West men's basketball standings
	Conf.				Overall
Team	W		L	PCT	W		L	PCT
UC Irvine	15	–	1	.938	25	–	5	.833
Utah State †	13	–	3	.813	28	–	6	.824
Long Beach State	10	–	6	.625	18	–	13	.581
UC Santa Barbara	10	–	6	.625	18	–	13	.581
Pacific	8	–	8	.500	18	–	12	.600
Boise State	8	–	8	.500	17	–	14	.548
Cal Poly	3	–	13	.188	9	–	19	.321
Idaho	3	–	13	.188	6	–	21	.222
Cal State Fullerton	3	–	13	.188	5	–	23	.179
† 2001 Big West tournament winner

The 2000–01 Utah State Aggies men's basketball team represented Utah State University in the 2000–01 college basketball season. This was head coach Stew Morrill's 3rd season at Utah State. The Aggies played their home games at the Dee Glen Smith Spectrum and were members of the Big West Conference. They finished the season 28–6, 13–3 to finish second in the regular season standings. They won the Big West tournament to earn an automatic bid to the 2001 NCAA Division I men's basketball tournament as No. 12 seed in the East Region. The Aggies upset No. 5 seed Ohio State in the opening round before falling to No. 4 seed UCLA in the round of 32.

== Roster ==
2000–01 Utah State Aggies men's basketball team
Players
Coaches

Pos.	#	Name	Height	Weight	Year	Hometown
F	5	Shawn Daniels	6 ft 6 in (1.98 m)	235 lb (107 kg)	Sr	Bakersfield, California
G	31	Tony Brown	6 ft 3 in (1.91 m)	—	Jr

Head coach

- Stew Morrill

Assistant coach(es)

Legend

- (C) Team captain
- (S) Suspended
- (I) Ineligible
- (W) Walk-on
- Injured
- Current redshirt

Roster

== Schedule and results ==
Date time, TV	Rank^{#}	Opponent^{#}	Result	Record	Site (attendance) city, state
Non-conference regular season
Nov 17, 2000*		vs. Santa Clara	W 76–67	1–0	Carlson Center (3,183); Fairbanks, Alaska
Nov 18, 2000*		vs. South Florida	W 69–66	2–0	Carlson Center (4,132); Fairbanks, Alaska
Nov 19, 2000*		vs. Austin Peay	L 76–80 ^{OT}	2–1	Carlson Center (4,842); Fairbanks, Alaska
Dec 6, 2000*		No. 22 Utah	W 58–57	5–1	Dee Glen Smith Spectrum (10,270); Logan, Utah
Dec 30, 2000*		Air Force	W 59–50	10–2	Dee Glen Smith Spectrum (6,832); Logan, Utah
Big West Regular Season
Jan 4, 2001		at Cal Poly	W 82–69	11–2 (1–0)	Robert A. Mott Athletics Center (2,415); San Luis Obispo, California
Mar 3, 2001		Cal Poly	W 82–55	24–5 (13–3)	Dee Glen Smith Spectrum (9,721); Logan, Utah
Big West tournament
Mar 8, 2001*		vs. Cal State Fullerton; Quarterfinals	W 74–43	25–5	Arrowhead Pond of Anaheim (1,915); Anaheim, California
Mar 9, 2001*		vs. Boise State; Semifinals	W 67–48	26–5	Arrowhead Pond of Anaheim (4,268); Anaheim, California
Mar 10, 2001*		vs. Pacific; Championship game	W 50–38	27–5	Arrowhead Pond of Anaheim (2,524); Anaheim, California
NCAA tournament
Mar 15, 2001*	(12 E)	vs. (5 E) Ohio State; First Round	W 77–68 ^{OT}	28–5	Greensboro Coliseum (14,235); Greensboro, North Carolina
Mar 17, 2001*	(12 E)	vs. (4 E) No. 15 UCLA; Second Round	L 50–75	28–6	Greensboro Coliseum (20,943); Greensboro, North Carolina
*Non-conference game. ^{#}Rankings from AP poll. (#) Tournament seedings in parentheses. E=East. All times are in Mountain.
