= 2003 Big West Conference men's basketball tournament =

- Classification: Division I
- Season: 2002–03
- Teams: 8
- Site: Anaheim Convention Center; Anaheim, CA
- Champions: Utah State (5th title)
- Winning coach: Stew Morrill (3rd title)
- MVP: Desmond Penigar (Utah State)

2002–03 Big West men's basketball standings
	Conf.				Overall
Team	W		L	PCT	W		L	PCT
UC Santa Barbara	14	–	4	.778	18	–	14	.563
UC Irvine	13	–	5	.722	20	–	9	.690
Utah State†	12	–	6	.667	24	–	9	.727
Cal Poly	10	–	8	.556	16	–	14	.533
Idaho	9	–	9	.500	13	–	15	.464
Cal State Fullerton	8	–	10	.444	10	–	19	.345
Cal State Northridge	8	–	10	.444	14	–	15	.483
Pacific	7	–	11	.389	12	–	16	.429
UC Riverside	5	–	13	.278	6	–	18	.250
Long Beach State	4	–	14	.222	5	–	22	.185
† 2003 Big West tournament winner As of April 10, 2003; Rankings from AP poll

The 2003 Big West Conference men's basketball tournament was held March 13–15 at Anaheim Convention Center in Anaheim, California.

Utah State defeated Cal Poly in the championship game, 57–54, to obtain the fifth Big West Conference men's basketball tournament championship in school history.

The Aggies participated in the 2003 NCAA Division I men's basketball tournament after earning the conference's automatic bid.

== Format ==
Eight of the ten teams in the conference participated, with UC Riverside and Long Beach State not qualifying. Teams were seeded based on regular season conference records.

== Bracket ==
Quarterfinals; Friday, March 13
1	UC Santa Barbara	53
8	Pacific	44
4	Cal Poly	54
5	Idaho	50
6	Cal State Fullerton	83
3	Utah State	89
7	Cal State Northridge	64
2	UC Irvine	70

Semifinals; Saturday, March 14
1	UC Santa Barbara	52
4	Cal Poly	67
6	Utah State	62
2	UC Irvine	55

Championship; Sunday, March 15
4	Cal Poly	54
3	Utah State	57
