= 2002–03 Idaho Vandals men's basketball team =

American college basketball season

2002–03 Idaho Vandals men's basketball
- Conference: Big West Conference
- Record: 13–15 (9–9 Big West)
- Head coach: Leonard Perry (2nd season)
- Home arena: Cowan Spectrum

2002–03 Big West men's basketball standings
	Conf.				Overall
Team	W		L	PCT	W		L	PCT
UC Santa Barbara	14	–	4	.778	18	–	14	.563
UC Irvine	13	–	5	.722	20	–	9	.690
Utah State†	12	–	6	.667	24	–	9	.727
Cal Poly	10	–	8	.556	16	–	14	.533
Idaho	9	–	9	.500	13	–	15	.464
Cal State Fullerton	8	–	10	.444	10	–	19	.345
Cal State Northridge	8	–	10	.444	14	–	15	.483
Pacific	7	–	11	.389	12	–	16	.429
UC Riverside	5	–	13	.278	6	–	18	.250
Long Beach State	4	–	14	.222	5	–	22	.185
† 2003 Big West tournament winner As of April 10, 2003; Rankings from AP poll

The 2002–03 Idaho Vandals men's basketball team represented the University of Idaho during the 2002–03 NCAA Division I men's basketball season. Members of the Big West Conference, the Vandals were led by second-year head coach Leonard Perry and played their home games on campus at Cowan Spectrum in Moscow, Idaho.

The Vandals were 13–14 overall in the regular season and 9–9 in conference play, fifth in the standings.

They met fourth seed Cal Poly in the first round of the conference tournament in Anaheim; although Idaho swept the regular season series, they lost to the Mustangs by four points.

== Postseason result ==
Date time, TV	Rank^{#}	Opponent^{#}	Result	Record	Site (attendance) city, state
Big West tournament
Thu, March 13; 12:00 pm	(5)	vs. (4) Cal Poly; Quarterfinal	L 50–54	13–15	Anaheim Convention Center; Anaheim, California
*Non-conference game. (#) Tournament seedings in parentheses. All times are in Pacific time.
