= 2009 WAC men's basketball tournament =

- Classification: Division I
- Season: 2008–09
- Teams: 9
- Site: Lawlor Events Center; Reno, Nevada
- Champions: Utah State (1st title)
- Winning coach: Stew Morrill (1st title)
- MVP: Gary Wilkinson (Utah State)
- Television: ESPNU, ESPN2

2008–09 WAC men's basketball standings
	Conf.				Overall
Team	W		L	PCT	W		L	PCT
Utah State †	14	–	2	.875	30	–	5	.857
Nevada	11	–	5	.688	21	–	13	.618
Idaho	9	–	7	.563	17	–	16	.515
Boise State	9	–	7	.563	19	–	13	.594
New Mexico State	9	–	7	.563	17	–	15	.531
Louisiana Tech	6	–	10	.375	15	–	18	.455
San Jose State	6	–	10	.375	13	–	17	.433
Hawaii	5	–	11	.313	13	–	17	.433
Fresno State	3	–	13	.188	13	–	21	.382
† Conference tournament winner

The 2009 WAC men's basketball tournament, a part of the 2008-09 NCAA Division I men's basketball season, was held March 10–14 at the Lawlor Events Center in Reno, Nevada.

Regular season champion Utah State won the tournament, defeating host Nevada in the title game, 72–62. The Aggies received the Western Athletic Conference's automatic bid to the NCAA tournament; they were seeded eleventh in the West region and lost by a point in the first round to Marquette.

No other WAC teams were invited to the NCAA or National Invitation Tournament (NIT). Nevada and Boise State lost in the first round of the CBI, and Idaho advanced to the second round of the CIT.

== Bracket ==
First round Tuesday, March 10
8	Hawaii	58
9	Fresno State	62

Quarterfinals; Thursday, March 12
1	Utah State	85
9	Fresno State	68
4	Boise State	70
5	New Mexico State	80
3	Idaho	62
6	Louisiana Tech	70
2	Nevada	78
7	San Jose State	69

Semifinals; Friday, March 13
1	Utah State	71
5	New Mexico State	70
6	Louisiana Tech	68
2	Nevada	77

Championship; Saturday, March 14
1	Utah State	72
2	Nevada	62
