= Mark Fox (basketball) =

American basketball coach (born 1969)

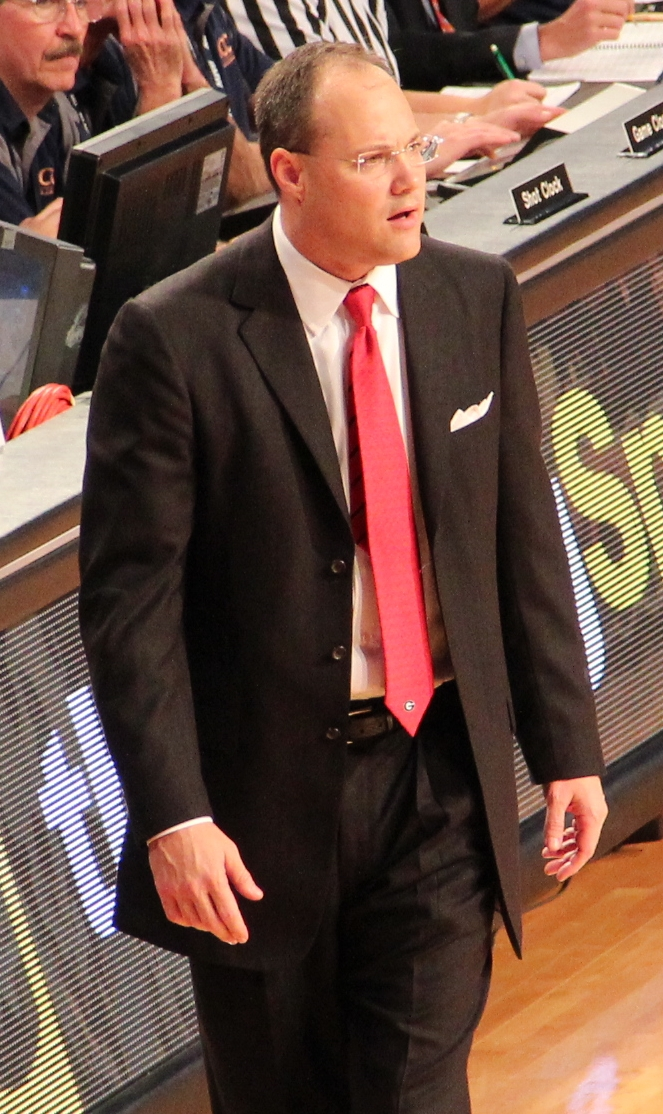
- Fox in 2012

Current position
- Title: Associate coach
- Team: Kentucky
- Conference: SEC

Biographical details
- Born: January 13, 1969 (age 57); Garden City, Kansas, U.S.

Playing career
- 1987–1989: Garden City CC
- 1989–1991: Eastern New Mexico

Coaching career (HC unless noted)
- 1991–1993: Washington (assistant)
- 1994–2000: Kansas State (assistant)
- 2000–2004: Nevada (assistant)
- 2004–2009: Nevada
- 2009–2018: Georgia
- 2019–2023: California
- 2024–present: Kentucky (assistant)

Administrative career (AD unless noted)
- 2023–2024: Georgetown (Director of Student-Athlete Relations)

Head coaching record
- Overall: 324–263 (.552)
- Tournaments: 2–5 (NCAA Division I); 2–3 (NIT); 0–2 (CBI)

Accomplishments and honors

Championships
- WAC tournament (2006); 4 WAC regular season (2005–2008)

Awards
- 3× WAC Coach of the Year (2005–2007)

Mark Leslie Fox (born January 13, 1969) is an American college basketball coach who is currently an assistant coach for the University of Kentucky. Fox was previously the head coach for the Nevada Wolf Pack from 2004–2009, the Georgia Bulldogs from 2009–2018, and the California Golden Bears from 2019–2023. He served the 2023–24 season as the Director of Student-Athlete Relations and NIL Partnerships for the Georgetown Hoyas.

== Coaching career ==
=== Nevada ===
Fox was the head coach for the Nevada Wolf Pack basketball team from 2004 to 2009. While with the Wolf Pack, Fox compiled an overall record of 123–43. He also guided the Wolf Pack to five postseason appearances in five years including three NCAA tournaments. The Wolf Pack also won the Western Athletic Conference regular-season championship in 2005, 2006, 2007, and 2008. In 2006, the team won the conference tournament as well.

Fox was named conference coach of the year three times (2005, 2006, 2007) while with Nevada.

=== Georgia ===
On April 3, 2009, it was announced that Fox would leave Nevada for the same position at the University of Georgia. In his first year as head coach, Fox and the Bulldogs went 14–17 and finished sixth in the Southeastern Conference East. The highlights of the season included victories over the Tennessee Volunteers and three top 25 teams.

In 2011, Fox's second season, the Bulldogs made improvements. The 2010–11 team won 21 games, finished 3rd in the SEC East and made it to the NCAA tournament for the first time since 2008. In 2011–12, the Bulldogs posted another sub-.500 record and finished near the bottom of the SEC with a 5–11 record.

After making the NIT in 2013–14, Fox got his team back to the NCAA tournament in 2014–15, narrowly falling to Michigan State in the first round. That Spartans team would eventually make it to the Final Four.

While at Georgia, Fox compiled an overall record of 163–133. He has placed three players in the NBA, Travis Leslie, Trey Thompkins and the 8th overall pick in the 2013 NBA Draft, Kentavious Caldwell-Pope, who would go on to win two NBA championships. On March 10, 2018, Georgia announced Fox would not return for a 10th season.

=== California ===
On March 29, 2019, it was announced that Fox would be hired as the new head coach at the University of California, Berkeley, for the Golden Bears. He was the school's 18th head coach all time. After four years and a record of 38–87, Cal fired Fox on March 9, 2023. Fox set a record for most losses (29) in a single season by a major conference coach in 2022–23. Fox's winning percentage at Cal (.304) is the second-worst winning percentage of any head men's basketball coach in school history.

=== Georgetown ===
Fox was the Director of Student-Athlete Relations and NIL Partnerships at Georgetown for the 2023–24 season.

=== Kentucky ===
On April 24, 2024 Fox was hired as an assistant coach at the University of Kentucky under Mark Pope.

== Head coaching record ==
Record table
Season	Team	Overall	Conference	Standing	Postseason
Nevada Wolf Pack (Western Athletic Conference) (2004–2009)
2004–05	Nevada	25–7	16–2	1st	NCAA Division I Round of 32
2005–06	Nevada	27–6	13–3	1st	NCAA Division I Round of 64
2006–07	Nevada	29–5	14–2	1st	NCAA Division I Round of 32
2007–08	Nevada	21–12	12–4	T–1st	CBI first round
2008–09	Nevada	21–13	11–5	2nd	CBI first round
Nevada:		123–43 (.741)	66–16 (.805)		
Georgia Bulldogs (Southeastern Conference) (2009–2018)
2009–10	Georgia	14–17	5–11	6th (East)	
2010–11	Georgia	21–12	9–7	T–3rd (East)	NCAA Division I Round of 64
2011–12	Georgia	15–17	5–11	T–10th	
2012–13	Georgia	15–17	9–9	T–8th	
2013–14	Georgia	20–14	12–6	T–2nd	NIT second round
2014–15	Georgia	21–12	11–7	T–3rd	NCAA Division I Round of 64
2015–16	Georgia	20–14	10–8	T–6th	NIT second round
2016–17	Georgia	19–15	9–9	8th	NIT first round
2017–18	Georgia	18–15	7–11	T–11th	
Georgia:		163–133 (.551)	77–79 (.494)		
California Golden Bears (Pac-12 Conference) (2019–2023)
2019–20	California	14–18	7–11	T–8th	
2020–21	California	9–20	3–17	12th	
2021–22	California	12–20	5–15	10th	
2022–23	California	3–29	2–18	12th	
California:		38–87 (.304)	17–61 (.218)		
Total:		324–263 (.552)			
National champion Postseason invitational champion Conference regular season champion Conference regular season and conference tournament champion Division regular season champion Division regular season and conference tournament champion Conference tournament champion
