= 2005 Big West Conference men's basketball tournament =

- Classification: Division I
- Season: 2004–05
- Teams: 8
- Site: Anaheim Convention Center; Anaheim, CA
- Champions: Utah State (6th title)
- Winning coach: Stew Morrill (4th title)
- MVP: Jaycee Carroll (Utah State)

2004–05 Big West men's basketball standings
	Conf.				Overall
Team	W		L	PCT	W		L	PCT
No. 22 Pacific	18	–	0	1.000	27	–	4	.871
Utah State †	13	–	5	.722	24	–	8	.750
Cal State Fullerton	12	–	6	.667	21	–	11	.656
Cal State Northridge	12	–	6	.667	18	–	13	.581
UC Irvine	8	–	10	.444	16	–	13	.552
Long Beach State	7	–	11	.389	10	–	20	.333
UC Santa Barbara	7	–	11	.389	11	–	18	.379
Idaho	6	–	12	.333	8	–	22	.267
UC Riverside	4	–	14	.222	9	–	19	.321
Cal Poly	3	–	15	.167	5	–	22	.185
† 2005 Big West tournament winner As of April 10, 2005; Rankings from AP poll

The 2005 Big West Conference men's basketball tournament was held March 9–12 at Anaheim Convention Center in Anaheim, California.

Utah State defeated Pacific in the championship game, 65–52, to obtain the sixth Big West Conference men's basketball tournament championship in school history.

The Aggies earned the conference's automatic bid to the 2005 NCAA Division I men's basketball tournament as the #14 seed in the Chicago regional. Pacific received an at-large bid as the #8 seed in the Albuquerque regional. This year marks the most recent time the Big West Conference has received more than one bid to the NCAA Division I men's basketball tournament.

== Format ==
Eight of the ten teams in the conference participated, with UC Riverside and Cal Poly not qualifying. Teams were seeded based on regular season conference records. The top four seeds received byes, with the top two seeds receiving a second bye into the semifinal round.

== Bracket ==
First round Thursday, March 9
5	UC Irvine	80
8	Idaho	67
6	UC Santa Barbara	55
7	Long Beach State	49

Quarterfinals; Friday, March 10
4	Cal State Northridge	72
5	UC Irvine	56
6	UC Santa Barbara	55
3	Cal State Fullerton	66

Semifinals; Saturday, March 11
1	#18 Pacific	63
4	Cal State Northridge	61
3	Cal State Fullerton	77
2	Utah State	84

Championship; Sunday, March 12
1	#18 Pacific	52
2	Utah State	65
