= 2004–05 Idaho Vandals men's basketball team =

American college basketball season

2004–05 Idaho Vandals men's basketball
- Conference: Big West Conference
- Record: 8–22 (6–12 Big West)
- Head coach: Leonard Perry (4th season)
- Home arena: Cowan Spectrum

2004–05 Big West men's basketball standings
	Conf.				Overall
Team	W		L	PCT	W		L	PCT
No. 22 Pacific	18	–	0	1.000	27	–	4	.871
Utah State †	13	–	5	.722	24	–	8	.750
Cal State Fullerton	12	–	6	.667	21	–	11	.656
Cal State Northridge	12	–	6	.667	18	–	13	.581
UC Irvine	8	–	10	.444	16	–	13	.552
Long Beach State	7	–	11	.389	10	–	20	.333
UC Santa Barbara	7	–	11	.389	11	–	18	.379
Idaho	6	–	12	.333	8	–	22	.267
UC Riverside	4	–	14	.222	9	–	19	.321
Cal Poly	3	–	15	.167	5	–	22	.185
† 2005 Big West tournament winner As of April 10, 2005; Rankings from AP poll

The 2004–05 Idaho Vandals men's basketball team represented the University of Idaho during the 2004–05 NCAA Division I men's basketball season. Members of the Big West Conference, the Vandals were led by fourth-year head coach Leonard Perry and played their home games on campus at Cowan Spectrum in Moscow, Idaho.

The Vandals were 8–21 overall in the regular season and 6–12 in conference play, eighth in the standings. They met fifth seed UC Irvine in the first round of the conference tournament in Anaheim and lost to the Anteaters by thirteen points.

This was Idaho's ninth and final season in the Big West and their overall record in the conference tourney was 1–7; they moved to the Western Athletic Conference (WAC) over the summer.

== Postseason result ==
Date time, TV	Opponent	Result	Record	Site (attendance) city, state
Big West tournament
Wed, March 9; 6:00 pm	vs. (5) UC Irvine; First round	L 67–80	8–22	Anaheim Convention Center (1,704); Anaheim, California
*Non-conference game. ^{#}Rankings from AP Poll. (#) Tournament seedings in parentheses. All times are in Pacific time.
