= 2008–09 Utah State Aggies men's basketball team =

American college basketball season

2008–09 Utah State Aggies men's basketball
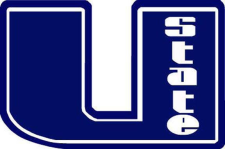

WAC tournament champions WAC Regular Season Champions

NCAA tournament, first round
- Conference: Western Athletic Conference
- Record: 30–5 (14–2 WAC)
- Head coach: Stew Morrill (11th season)
- Assistant coaches: Tim Duryea; Chris Jones; Tarvish Felton
- Home arena: Smith Spectrum

2008–09 WAC men's basketball standings
	Conf.				Overall
Team	W		L	PCT	W		L	PCT
Utah State †	14	–	2	.875	30	–	5	.857
Nevada	11	–	5	.688	21	–	13	.618
Idaho	9	–	7	.563	17	–	16	.515
Boise State	9	–	7	.563	19	–	13	.594
New Mexico State	9	–	7	.563	17	–	15	.531
Louisiana Tech	6	–	10	.375	15	–	18	.455
San Jose State	6	–	10	.375	13	–	17	.433
Hawaii	5	–	11	.313	13	–	17	.433
Fresno State	3	–	13	.188	13	–	21	.382
† Conference tournament winner

The 2008–09 Utah State Aggies men's basketball team represented Utah State University in the 2008–09 college basketball season. This was head coach Stew Morrill's 11th season at Utah State. The Aggies played their home games at the Dee Glen Smith Spectrum and were members of the Western Athletic Conference. They finished the season 30–5, 14–2 to capture the regular season championship for the second straight year. They also won the 2009 WAC men's basketball tournament to earn an automatic bid to the 2009 NCAA Division I men's basketball tournament. As No. 11 seed in the West Region, they lost to No. 6 seed and AP #23 Marquette in the first round.

== Roster ==
2008–09 Utah State Aggies men's basketball team
Players
Coaches

Pos.	#	Name	Height	Weight	Year	Hometown
G	21	Jared Quayle	6 ft 1 in (1.85 m)	180 lb (82 kg)	Jr	Provo, Utah
F	42	Tai Wesley	6 ft 7 in (2.01 m)	240 lb (109 kg)	So	Provo, Utah
F	55	Gary Wilkinson	6 ft 9 in (2.06 m)	240 lb (109 kg)	Sr	South Jordan, Utah

Head coach

- Stew Morrill

Assistant coach(es)

Legend

- (C) Team captain
- (S) Suspended
- (I) Ineligible
- (W) Walk-on
- Injured
- Current redshirt

Roster

== Schedule and results ==
Date time, TV	Rank^{#}	Opponent^{#}	Result	Record	Site (attendance) city, state
Non-conference regular season
Nov 14, 2008*		Montana State–Northern	W 71–50	1–0	Dee Glen Smith Spectrum (8,658); Logan, Utah
Nov 17, 2008*		at UC Santa Barbara	W 61–59	2–0	The Thunderdome (4,028); Santa Barbara, California
Nov 25, 2008*		Weber State	W 75–49	3–0	Dee Glen Smith Spectrum (7,693); Logan, Utah
Nov 29, 2008*		Cal Poly	W 97–57	4–0	Dee Glen Smith Spectrum (6,715); Logan, Utah
Dec 2, 2008*		UC Irvine	W 74–62	5–0	Dee Glen Smith Spectrum (7,438); Logan, Utah
Dec 6, 2008*		vs. BYU	L 63–68	5–1	EnergySolutions Arena (13,890); Salt Lake City, Utah
Dec 13, 2008*		at Utah Valley	W 69–50	6–1	McKay Events Center (4,023); Orem, Utah
Dec 17, 2008*		at Southern Utah	W 72–65	7–1	America First Event Center (3,157); Cedar City, Utah
Dec 20, 2008*		at Idaho State	W 67–57	8–1	Holt Arena (2,976); Pocatello, Idaho
Dec 22, 2008*		Utah	W 66–64	9–1	Dee Glen Smith Spectrum (8,358); Logan, Utah
Dec 29, 2008*		Howard	W 85–45	10–1	Dee Glen Smith Spectrum (8,382); Logan, Utah
Dec 30, 2008*		Houston Baptist	W 94–77	11–1	Dee Glen Smith Spectrum (8,522); Logan, Utah
Dec 31, 2008*		Wyoming	W 90–85 ^{OT}	12–1	Dee Glen Smith Spectrum (8,877); Logan, Utah
WAC Regular Season
Jan 5, 2009		Idaho	W 70–61	13–1 (1–0)	Dee Glen Smith Spectrum (9,138); Logan, Utah
Jan 8, 2009		at Louisiana Tech	W 50–37	14–1 (2–0)	Thomas Assembly Center (1,442); Ruston, Louisiana
Jan 10, 2009		at New Mexico State	W 77–67	15–1 (3–0)	Pan American Center (6,577); Las Cruces, New Mexico
Jan 15, 2009		Fresno State	W 65–61	16–1 (4–0)	Dee Glen Smith Spectrum (8,637); Logan, Utah
Jan 17, 2009		Boise State	W 79–65	17–1 (5–0)	Dee Glen Smith Spectrum (10,270); Logan, Utah
Jan 22, 2009		at San Jose State	W 62–58	18–1 (6–0)	The Event Center (1,948); San Jose, California
Jan 24, 2009		at Hawaii	W 67–51	19–1 (7–0)	Stan Sheriff Center (6,314); Honolulu, Hawaii
Jan 29, 2009		Nevada	W 72–61	20–1 (8–0)	Dee Glen Smith Spectrum (10,023); Logan, Utah
Jan 31, 2009		at Fresno State	W 83–77 ^{OT}	21–1 (9–0)	Save Mart Center (9,555); Fresno, California
Feb 5, 2009	No. 25	New Mexico State	W 78–59	22–1 (10–0)	Dee Glen Smith Spectrum (9,415); Logan, Utah
Feb 7, 2009	No. 25	Louisiana Tech	W 60–52	23–1 (11–0)	Dee Glen Smith Spectrum (10,270); Logan, Utah
Feb 12, 2009	No. 21	at Idaho	W 62–53	24–1 (12–0)	Cowan Spectrum (2,295); Moscow, Idaho
Feb 14, 2009	No. 21	at Boise State	L 56–66	24–2 (12–1)	Taco Bell Arena (7,587); Boise, Idaho
Feb 18, 2009*		Cal State Bakersfield	W 78–57	25–2	Dee Glen Smith Spectrum (8,189); Logan, Utah
Feb 21, 2009*		at Saint Mary's; ESPN Bracketbusters	L 64–75	25–3	McKeon Pavilion (3,500); Moraga, California
Feb 26, 2009		Hawaii	W 82–62	26–3 (13–1)	Dee Glen Smith Spectrum (8,717); Logan, Utah
Feb 28, 2009		at Nevada	L 71–84	26–4 (13–2)	Lawlor Events Center (8,515); Reno, Nevada
Mar 7, 2009		San Jose State	W 89–77	27–4 (14–2)	Dee Glen Smith Spectrum (10,270); Logan, Utah
WAC tournament
Mar 12, 2009*	(1)	vs. (9) Fresno State; Quarterfinals	W 85–68	28–4	Lawlor Events Center (2,586); Reno, Nevada
Mar 13, 2009*	(1)	vs. (5) New Mexico State; Semifinals	W 71–70	29–4	Lawlor Events Center (7,397); Reno, Nevada
Mar 14, 2009*	(1)	at (2) Nevada; Championship	W 72–62	30–4	Lawlor Events Center (7,820); Reno, Nevada
NCAA tournament
Mar 20, 2009*	(11 W)	vs. (6 W) No. 23 Marquette; First Round	L 57–58	30–5	Taco Bell Arena (11,997); Boise, Idaho
*Non-conference game. ^{#}Rankings from AP poll. (#) Tournament seedings in parentheses. W=West. All times are in Mountain.
