= 2006 WAC men's basketball tournament =

- 2006 WAC Basketball Tournament logo
- Classification: Division I
- Season: 2005–06
- Teams: 8
- Site: Lawlor Events Center; Reno, Nevada
- Champions: Nevada Wolf Pack (2nd title)
- Winning coach: Mark Fox (1st title)
- MVP: Nick Fazekas (Nevada)

2005–06 WAC men's basketball standings
	Conf.				Overall
Team	W		L	PCT	W		L	PCT
No. 20 Nevada †	13	–	3	.813	27	–	6	.818
Utah State	11	–	5	.688	23	–	9	.719
Louisiana Tech	11	–	5	.688	20	–	13	.606
Hawaii	10	–	6	.625	17	–	11	.607
New Mexico State	10	–	6	.625	16	–	14	.533
Fresno State	8	–	8	.500	15	–	13	.536
Boise State	6	–	10	.375	14	–	15	.483
San Jose State	2	–	14	.125	6	–	25	.194
Idaho	1	–	15	.063	4	–	25	.138
† 2006 WAC tournament winner Rankings from AP poll

The 2006 WAC men's basketball tournament was held March 9–11 in the Lawlor Events Center in Reno, Nevada. Top-seeded #21 Nevada, the host, won the title.

Fresno State did not participate.

== Bracket ==
Quarterfinals; Thursday, March 9
3	Louisiana Tech	75
6	Boise State	64
2	Utah State	76
7	San Jose State	69
1	#21 Nevada	68
8	Idaho	55
4	Hawaii	57
5	New Mexico State	58

Semifinals; Friday, March 10
3	Louisiana Tech	64
2	Utah State	68
1	#21 Nevada	70
5	New Mexico State	59

Final; Saturday, March 11
2	Utah State	63
1	#21 Nevada	70
