= 2001 Big West Conference men's basketball tournament =

American men's collegiate postseason basketball tournament

- Classification: Division I
- Season: 2000–01
- Teams: 8
- Site: Anaheim Convention Center; Anaheim, CA
- Champions: Utah State (4th title)
- Winning coach: Stew Morrill (2nd title)
- MVP: Bernard Rock (Utah State)

2000–01 Big West men's basketball standings
	Conf.				Overall
Team	W		L	PCT	W		L	PCT
UC Irvine	15	–	1	.938	25	–	5	.833
Utah State †	13	–	3	.813	28	–	6	.824
Long Beach State	10	–	6	.625	18	–	13	.581
UC Santa Barbara	10	–	6	.625	18	–	13	.581
Pacific	8	–	8	.500	18	–	12	.600
Boise State	8	–	8	.500	17	–	14	.548
Cal Poly	3	–	13	.188	9	–	19	.321
Idaho	3	–	13	.188	6	–	21	.222
Cal State Fullerton	3	–	13	.188	5	–	23	.179
† 2001 Big West tournament winner

The 2001 Big West Conference men's basketball tournament was held March 8–10 at Anaheim Convention Center in Anaheim, California.

Utah State defeated New Mexico State in the championship game, 71–66, to obtain the fourth Big West Conference men's basketball tournament championship in school history.

The Aggies participated in the 2001 NCAA Division I men's basketball tournament after earning the conference's automatic bid.

== Format ==
Eight of the nine teams in the conference participated, with Idaho not qualifying. The top eight teams were seeded based on regular season conference records.

== Bracket ==
Quarterfinals; Friday, March 8
1	UC Irvine	71
8	Cal Poly	66
4	UC Santa Barbara	69
5	Pacific	71*
6	Boise State	95
3	Long Beach State	70
7	Cal State Fullerton	43
2	Utah State	74

Semifinals; Saturday, March 9
1	UC Irvine	58
5	Pacific	74
6	Boise State	48
2	Utah State	67

Championship; Sunday, March 10
5	Pacific	38
2	Utah State	50
