= 2004–05 Pacific Tigers men's basketball team =

American college basketball season

2004–05 Pacific Tigers men's basketball

Big West regular season champions

NCAA tournament, second round
- Conference: Big West Conference

Ranking
- AP: No. 22
- Record: 27–4 (18–0 Big West)
- Head coach: Bob Thomason (17th season)
- Home arena: Alex G. Spanos Center

2004–05 Big West men's basketball standings
	Conf.				Overall
Team	W		L	PCT	W		L	PCT
No. 22 Pacific	18	–	0	1.000	27	–	4	.871
Utah State †	13	–	5	.722	24	–	8	.750
Cal State Fullerton	12	–	6	.667	21	–	11	.656
Cal State Northridge	12	–	6	.667	18	–	13	.581
UC Irvine	8	–	10	.444	16	–	13	.552
Long Beach State	7	–	11	.389	10	–	20	.333
UC Santa Barbara	7	–	11	.389	11	–	18	.379
Idaho	6	–	12	.333	8	–	22	.267
UC Riverside	4	–	14	.222	9	–	19	.321
Cal Poly	3	–	15	.167	5	–	22	.185
† 2005 Big West tournament winner As of April 10, 2005; Rankings from AP poll

The 2004–05 Pacific Tigers men's basketball team represented the University of the Pacific during the 2004–05 NCAA Division I men's basketball season. The Tigers were led by 17th-year head coach Bob Thomason and played their home games at the Alex G. Spanos Center in Stockton, California as members of the Big West Conference. Pacific swept through the Big West regular season schedule to finish a sparkling 18–0 in conference play. The Tigers lost to Utah State in the championship game of the Big West tournament, but did receive an at-large bid to the NCAA tournament. Playing as the No. 8 seed in the Albuquerque region, the team defeated No. 9 seed Pittsburgh in the opening round. Playing in the Round of 32 for the second straight season, the Tigers were beaten by No. 1 seed Washington to end their season at 27–4 (18–0 Big West).

== Roster ==
2004–05 Pacific Tigers men's basketball team
Players	Coaches
Pos. / # / Name / Height / Weight / Year / Hometown; C / 33 / Guillaume Yango / 6 ft 9 in (2.06 m) / 240 lb (109 kg) / Sr	Head coach: Bob Thomason (Pacific); Assistant coach(es) Legend: (C) Team captain; (S) Suspended; (I) Ineligible; (W) Walk-on; Injured; Current redshirt; Roster

== Schedule and results ==
Date time, TV	Rank^{#}	Opponent^{#}	Result	Record	Site (attendance) city, state
Regular season
Nov 20, 2004*		at San Jose State	W 70–52	1–0	The Event Center (1,031); San Jose, California
Nov 23, 2004*		Santa Clara	W 71–65	2–0	Alex G. Spanos Center (4,259); Stockton, California
Dec 4, 2004*		at No. 2 Kansas	L 70–81	2–1	Allen Fieldhouse (16,300); Lawrence, Kansas
Dec 8, 2004*		at UC Davis	W 78–63	3–1	The Pavilion (1,869); Davis, California
Dec 11, 2004*		at Nevada	W 72–69	4–1	Lawlor Events Center (7,872); Reno, Nevada
Dec 18, 2004*		San Francisco	L 64–67	4–2	Alex G. Spanos Center (3,737); Stockton, California
Dec 21, 2004*		at Fresno State	W 88–77	5–2	Save Mart Center (11,933); Fresno, California
Dec 28, 2004		UC Riverside	W 58–45	6–2 (1–0)	Alex G. Spanos Center (3,528); Stockton, California
Mar 5, 2005		at UC Riverside	W 64–48	25–2 (18–0)	UCR Student Rec Center (1,020); Riverside, California
Big West tournament
Mar 11, 2005*		vs. Cal State Northridge; Semifinals	W 63–61	26–2	Arrowhead Pond of Anaheim (5,563); Anaheim, California
Mar 12, 2005*		vs. Utah State; Championship game	L 52–65	26–3	Arrowhead Pond of Anaheim (5,229); Anaheim, California
NCAA tournament
Mar 17, 2005*	(8 ABQ)	vs. (9 ABQ) Pittsburgh; First Round	W 79–71	27–3	Taco Bell Arena (11,878); Boise, Idaho
Mar 19, 2005*	(8 ABQ)	vs. (1 ABQ) No. 8 Washington; Second Round	L 79–97	27–4	Taco Bell Arena (11,891); Boise, Idaho
*Non-conference game. ^{#}Rankings from AP Poll. (#) Tournament seedings in parentheses. ABQ=Albuquerque. All times are in Pacific Time.

== Awards and honors ==
- Bob Thomason – Hugh Durham Award, Big West Coach of the Year
