= Bear River High School (Utah) =

Public high school in Garland, Utah, United States

Location
- 1450 S Main; Garland, Utah 84312; United States; 41°43′27″N 112°09′46″W

Information
- Type: Public secondary school
- Established: 1921
- School district: Box Elder School District
- NCES School ID: 490009000043
- Principal: David Lee
- Grades: 10-12
- Enrollment: 1,194 (2024-2025)
- Colors: Red; White; Black
- Athletics: UHSAA
- Athletics conference: Class 4A Region XI
- Mascot: Bear
- Nickname: Bear River Bears
- Website: www.brhs.besd.net

Bear River High School is a public high school in Garland, Utah, United States, part of the Box Elder School District.

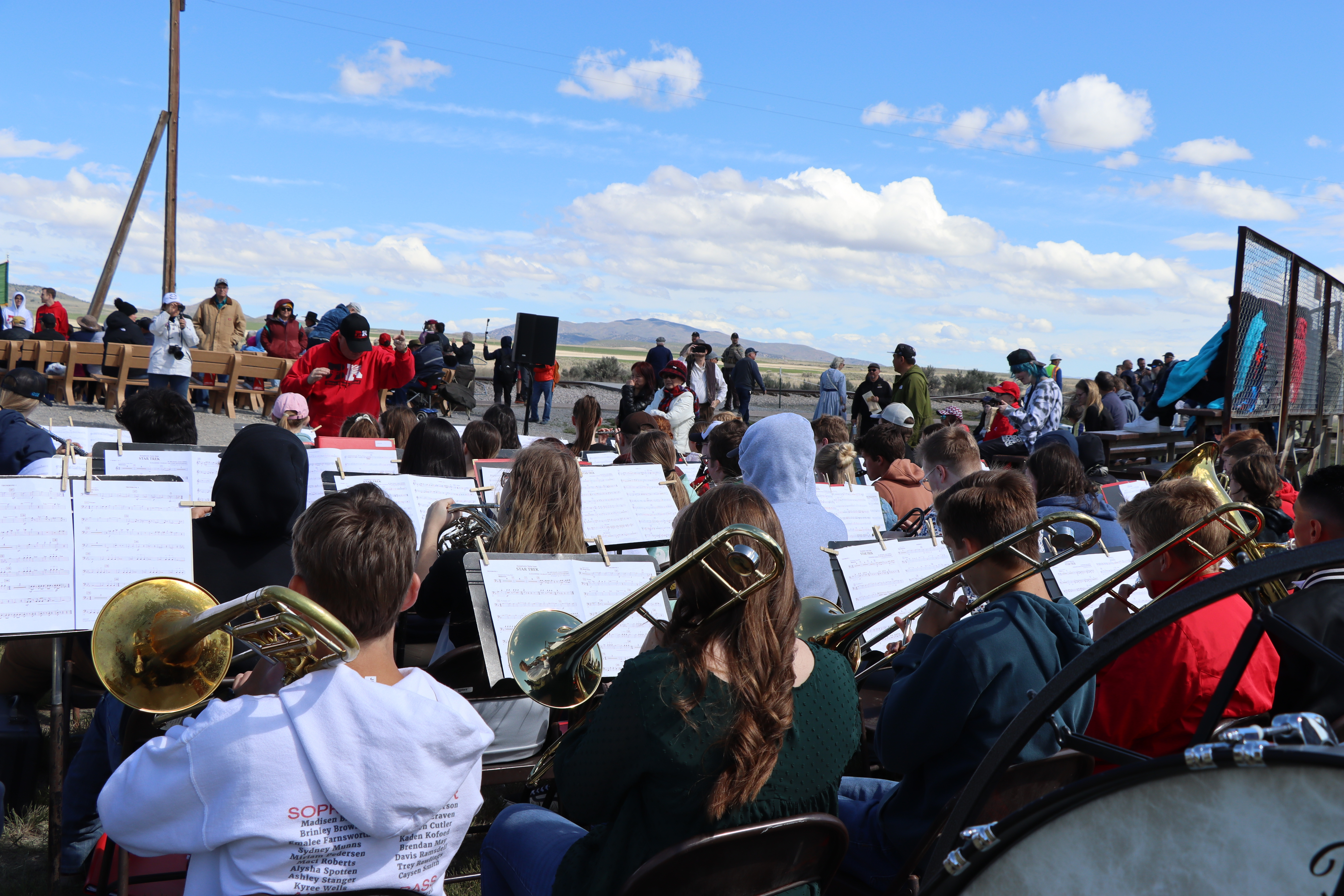
Band performance at the Golden Spike

== Athletics ==
Bear River High School athletics participate in the Utah High School Activities Association in Class 4A Region XI.

=== Athletic State Championships ===
- Baseball: 2004
- Boys basketball: 1959, 2000, 2009
- Girls basketball: 1989
- Boys cross country: 2010
- Football: 2003, 2004, 2006
- Girls lacrosse: 2022, 2023, 2024
- Girls wrestling: 2025
- Boys soccer: 1996
- Softball: 2001, 2002, 2008, 2009, 2010, 2011, 2012, 2016, 2018, 2021, 2023, 2025
- Boys swimming: 1944
- Boys tennis: 2017
- Boys track: 2000
- Boys wrestling: 1966, 2016, 2022, 2023, 2024, 2025
- Boys rugby 2026
