= Stew Morrill =

American basketball player and coach

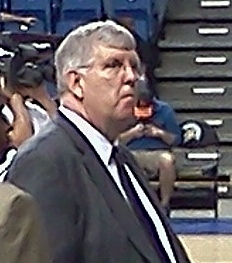
- Morrill at San Jose State in 2014

Biographical details
- Born: July 25, 1952 (age 74); Provo, Utah, U.S.

Playing career
- 1970–1972: Ricks JC
- 1972–1974: Gonzaga

Coaching career (HC unless noted)
- 1974–1978: Gonzaga (assistant)
- 1978–1986: Montana (assistant)
- 1986–1991: Montana
- 1991–1998: Colorado State
- 1998–2015: Utah State

Head coaching record
- Overall: 620–294 (.678)
- Tournaments: 1–9 (NCAA Division I); 0–6 (NIT); 4–1 (CIT)

Accomplishments and honors

Championships
- 2 WAC tournament (2009, 2011); 4 WAC regular season (2008–2011); 4 Big West tournament (2000, 2001, 2003, 2005); 3 Big West regular season (2000, 2002, 2004); Big Sky tournament (1991); Big Sky regular season (1991)

Awards
- 3× WAC Coach of the Year (2009–2011); 2× Big West Coach of the Year (2000, 2002); Big Sky Coach of the Year (1991); Jim Phelan Award (2011)

Stewart Morrill (born July 25, 1952) is an American former college basketball coach and the former head coach of the Utah State University men's basketball team.

== Biography ==
Morrill was an All-American at Ricks College and a two-time All-Big Sky selection for Gonzaga University. He started his coaching career in 1974 as an assistant at Gonzaga, and continued at the University of Montana under Mike Montgomery in 1978. In the spring of 1986, he was promoted to head coach of the Grizzlies, and led them to an NCAA berth in 1991. Morrill coached at Colorado State University from 1991 to 1998 before resigning to go to Utah State.

Morrill and Utah State gained national attention in March 2001 for their 77–68 upset of Ohio State in overtime in the NCAA tournament.

On January 17, 2008, in an 82–78 victory over Boise State, Morrill logged his 226th Aggie victory, passing E. Lowell Romney to become the winningest coach in Utah State basketball history.

Morrill has a record of 602–281 overall (.682), and 402–156 (.720) with Utah State. His 500th win came in January 2010 at Idaho, coached by his former assistant, Don Verlin. He has also racked up an incredible home record of 193–13 (.937) in the Dee Glen Smith Spectrum as coach of the Aggies. Following a victory over San Jose State on March 9, 2009, Morrill became the only coach in Utah State history to have back-to-back undefeated seasons at home, extending the streak to 34 straight home wins. He is also the only Utah State coach to win thirty games in one season, a feat he accomplished in the 2008–09 season, and the 2010–11 season. During the 2009–10 season, he became the only Utah State basketball coach to win three straight regular season conference championships. The next year, he won his fourth straight regular season conference championship. Although he has a very impressive regular season record, he did not find success in the NCAA tournament, posting the second worst record, 1–9 (.100) for any coach that has made the NCAA tournament five or more times. He also has a record of 0–6 in the NIT.

With Morrill at the helm, the Aggies were one of only three Division I teams to have won at least 23 games from 1999 to 2011. The other schools are Gonzaga and Kansas. All throughout the 2000s and early 2010s under Morrill, Utah State (.764) had the fourth-best winning percentage in the nation behind Duke (.831), Kansas (.809) and Gonzaga (.799).

On January 9, 2015, USU announced that Morrill would retire at the end of the 2014–2015 season.

== Head coaching record ==
Record table
Season	Team	Overall	Conference	Standing	Postseason
Montana Grizzlies (Big Sky Conference) (1987–1991)
1986–87	Montana	18–11	8–6	3rd	
1987–88	Montana	18–11	7–9	T–7th	
1988–89	Montana	20–11	11–5	3rd	
1989–90	Montana	18–11	10–6	3rd	
1990–91	Montana	23–8	13–3	1st	NCAA Division I First Round
Montana:		97–52 (.651)	49–29 (.628)		
Colorado State Rams (Western Athletic Conference) (1991–1999)
1991–92	Colorado State	14–17	8–8	T–8th	
1992–93	Colorado State	17–12	9–9	5th	
1993–94	Colorado State	15–13	8–10	T–5th	
1994–95	Colorado State	17–14	7–11	T–8th	
1995–96	Colorado State	18–12	11–7	4th	NIT first round
1996–97	Colorado State	20–9	10–6	4th (Pacific)	
1997–98	Colorado State	20–9	8–6	4th (Mountain)	NIT first round
Colorado State:		121–86 (.585)	61–57 (.517)		
Utah State Aggies (Big West Conference) (1998–2005)
1998–99	Utah State	15–13	8–8	4th (Eastern)	
1999–2000	Utah State	28–6	16–0	1st (Eastern)	NCAA Division I First Round
2000–01	Utah State	28–6	13–3	2nd	NCAA Division I Second Round
2001–02	Utah State	23–8	13–5	T–1st	NIT first round
2002–03	Utah State	24–9	12–6	3rd	NCAA Division I First Round
2003–04	Utah State	25–4	17–1	T–1st	NIT first round
2004–05	Utah State	24–8	13–5	2nd	NCAA Division I First Round
Utah State Aggies (Western Athletic Conference) (2005–2013)
2005–06	Utah State	23–9	11–5	T–2nd	NCAA Division I First Round
2006–07	Utah State	23–12	9–7	4th	NIT first round
2007–08	Utah State	24–11	12–4	T–1st	NIT first round
2008–09	Utah State	30–5	14–2	1st	NCAA Division I First Round
2009–10	Utah State	27–8	14–2	1st	NCAA Division I First Round
2010–11	Utah State	30–4	15–1	1st	NCAA Division I First Round
2011–12	Utah State	21–16	8–6	4th	CIT Runner-up
2012–13	Utah State	21–10	11–7	T–4th	
Utah State Aggies (Mountain West Conference) (2013–2015)
2013–14	Utah State	18–14	7–11	T–8th	
2014–15	Utah State	18–13	11–7	T–4th	
Utah State:		402–156 (.720)	204–80 (.718)		
Total:		620–294 (.678)			
National champion Postseason invitational champion Conference regular season champion Conference regular season and conference tournament champion Division regular season champion Division regular season and conference tournament champion Conference tournament champion

== See also ==
- List of college men's basketball coaches with 600 wins
