= Monte del Sol Charter School =

Public charter high school in Santa Fe, New Mexico, United States

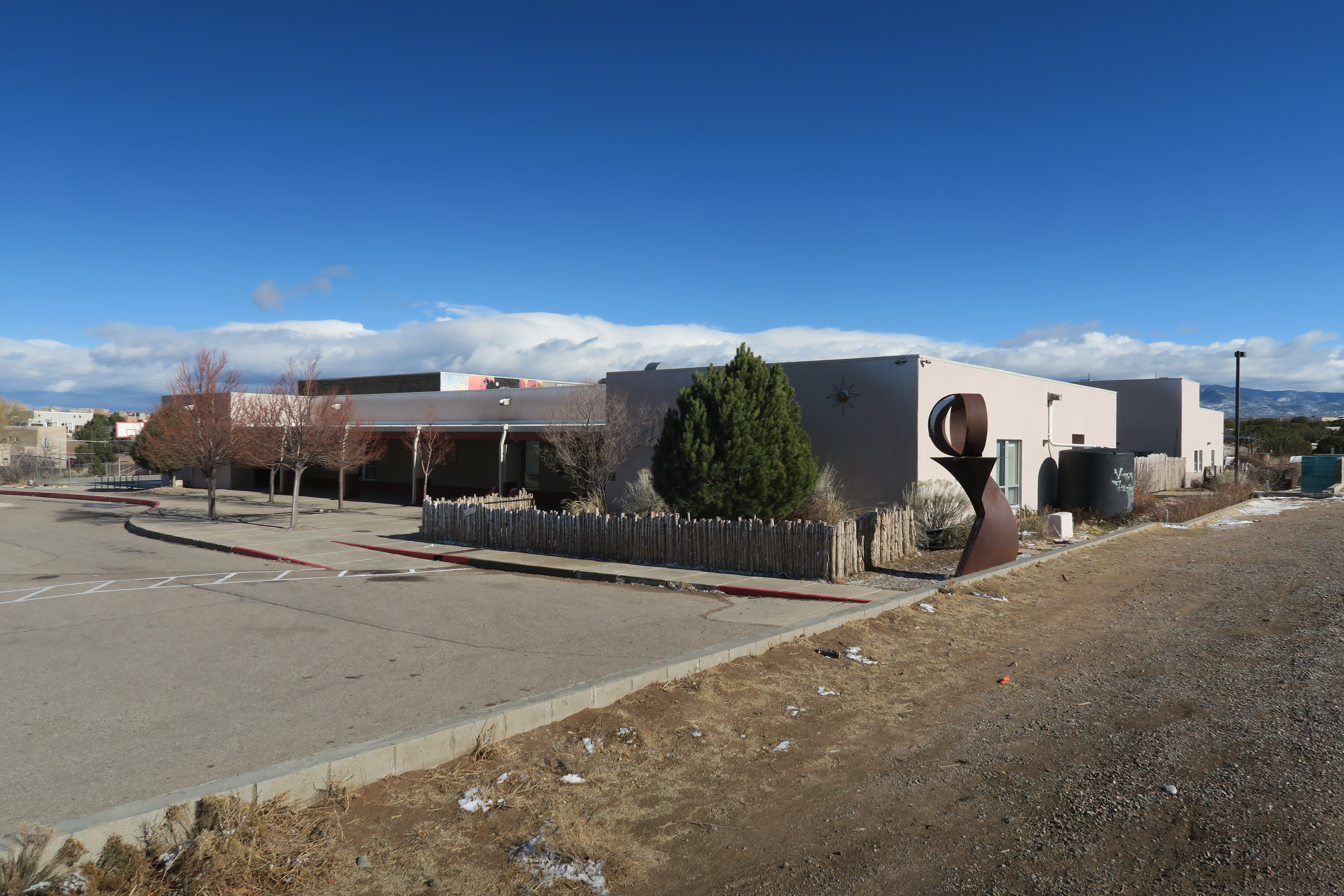
- Monte del Sol Charter School

Location
- 4157 Walking Rain Rd. Santa Fe, Santa Fe, New Mexico 87507; United States; 35.6246°N 106.0098°W

Information
- Type: Charter high school
- Opened: 2000
- School district: monte del sol charter school
- CEEB code: 320609
- NCES School ID: 350017000816
- Principal: Zoe Nelsen
- Faculty: 31.30 (FTE)
- Grades: 7 - 12
- Enrollment: 349 (2018–19)
- Student to teacher ratio: 11.15
- Colors: Red, black, and white
- Athletics conference: NMAA
- Mascot: Dragon
- Website: www.montedelsolcharterschool.org

Monte del Sol Charter is a public charter high school in Santa Fe, New Mexico. As of 2017, the school had 353 students and 25 classroom teachers.

The school was founded by Tony Gerlicz, who originally planned to emphasize arts and music classes and a less rigid hierarchy. The school received its charter in 1999 and began offering classes in 2000. During its first term the school operated out of the Santa Fe Boys & Girls Club. From 2001 to 2003 the school operated in a strip mall during construction of a new campus. Since the 2003–2004 school year, the school's campus has been on the southwestern edge of the city in the Nava Ade neighborhood.

In 2008 Gerlicz left the school to head the American School of Warsaw, and was eventually replaced as principal by Angela Ritchie. Ritchie used a more top-down management style, emphasized improving the school's test scores, and worked to resolve the school's budget shortfall by cutting some art and music programs. Ritchie left the school in 2011.

In 2014, the school was named one of the best schools in the state by U.S. News & World Report.

The school describes the Coalition of Essential Schools as a guide to its development.
