= Leonard Perry =

American basketball player and coach

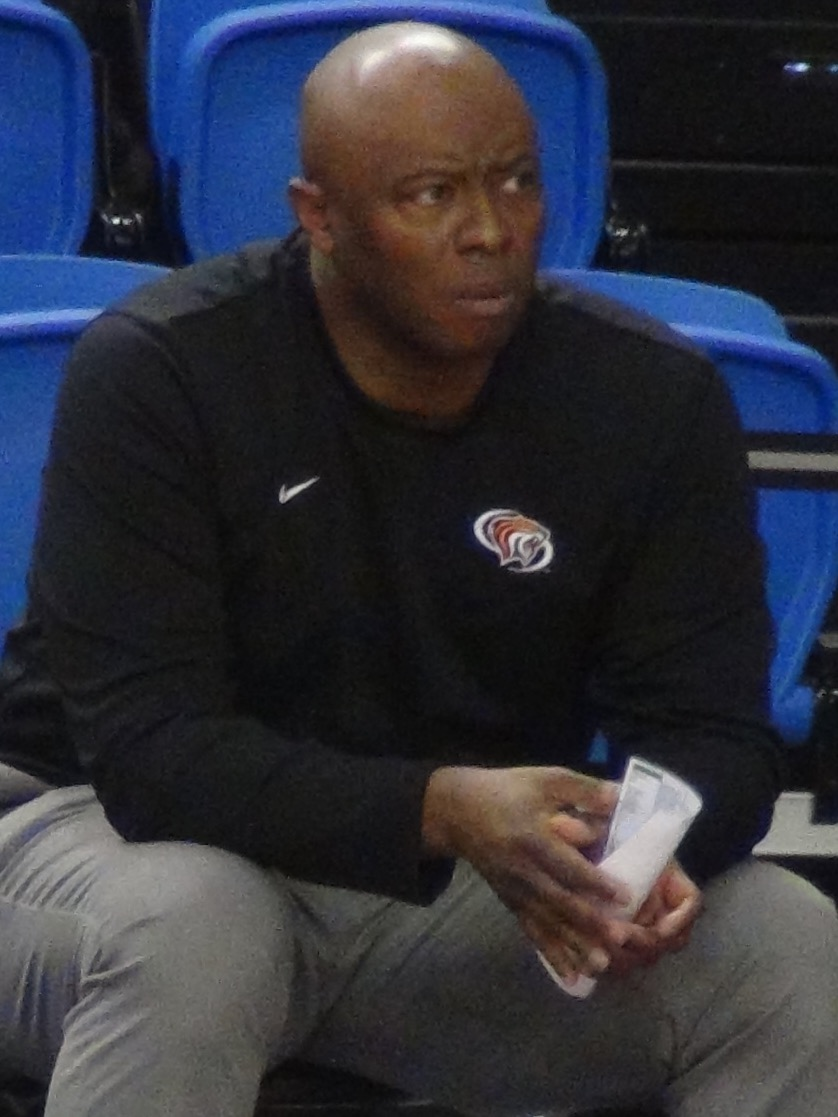
- Perry in 2021.

Biographical details
- Born: June 14, 1968 (age 58); Dallas, Texas, U.S.

Playing career
- 1987–1989: McLennan CC
- 1989–1991: Idaho
- Position: Shooting guard / point guard

Coaching career (HC unless noted)
- 1995–1998: Utah State (assistant)
- 1998–1999: Iowa State (assistant)
- 1999–2001: Iowa State (associate HC)
- 2001–2006: Idaho
- 2006–2007: Indiana Pacers (assistant)
- 2007–2008: Indiana Pacers (assistant/scout)
- 2008–2011: Indiana Pacers (scout)
- 2011–2012: Southern Miss (assistant)
- 2012–2016: Colorado State (associate HC)
- 2016–2021: Pacific (associate HC)
- 2021–2024: Pacific
- 2024–2025: Weber State (assistant)

Head coaching record
- Overall: 77–162 (.322)

Leonard Perry Jr. (born June 13, 1968) is an American college basketball coach, who most recently served as an assistant coach at Weber State in 2024-25. He served as the head coach at the University of the Pacific for 3 seasons from 2021 to 2024. Originally from Dallas, Perry played college basketball at McLennan Community College and the University of Idaho. As a senior at Idaho playing under head coach Larry Eustachy, Perry was the starting point guard on the 1991 Big Sky Conference Tournament championship team that appeared in the 1991 NCAA Tournament.

Perry has been a college basketball coach since 1995, as an assistant under Eustachy at Idaho, Utah State, Iowa State, Southern Miss, and Colorado State. From 2001 to 2006, Perry was head coach at Idaho. He also worked for the Indiana Pacers of the NBA for five years, starting as assistant coach in the 2006–07 season and as a scout from 2007 to 2011.

From 2016 to 2021, Perry was an assistant coach at University of the Pacific under Damon Stoudamire. After Stoudamire resigned to take an NBA assistant coaching job, Perry was promoted to head coach at Pacific in 2021.

== Early life and education ==
Born and raised in Dallas, Perry graduated from Justin F. Kimball High School in Dallas in 1986. Perry was an honorable mention All-American basketball player at Kimball.

From 1986 to 1988, Perry attended McLennan Community College, playing at point guard. Perry transferred to the University of Idaho in 1988, when Street & Smith ranked Perry among the best junior college transfers in the nation.

At Idaho, Perry played under head coach Larry Eustachy for Idaho Vandals men's basketball from 1989 to 1991. As a senior, Perry averaged 7.0 points and 2.8 rebounds on an Idaho team that won the 1991 Big Sky Conference Tournament and qualified for the NCAA Tournament.

While completing his undergraduate degree, Perry was a student assistant coach at Idaho from 1993 to 1995, again under Eustachy. Perry graduated from Idaho in 1995 with a bachelor's degree in general studies with an emphasis on English.

== Coaching career ==
=== Early coaching career (1995–2001) ===
From 1995 to 1998, Perry was an assistant coach at Utah State on Eustachy's staff. Utah State had three straight winning seasons and appeared in the 1998 NCAA Tournament in that time period.

Perry then followed Eustachy to Iowa State, serving as assistant coach from 1998 to 2000 and associate head coach in the 2000–01 season. The 1999–2000 Iowa State team finished 32–5, advanced to the Elite Eight round of the NCAA Tournament, and was ranked no. 6 in the final AP Top 25 poll. Iowa State then had a second straight NCAA Tournament appearance in 2001.

=== Idaho head coach (2001–2006) ===
Perry was head coach at Idaho from 2001 to 2006. Inheriting a 6–21 team, Perry had a 9–19 record in his first season at Idaho.

In the next two seasons, Idaho improved to 13–15 in 2002–03 and 14–16 in 2003–04. However, Idaho won only 12 games in the 2004–05 and 2005–06 seasons combined, resulting in Idaho firing Perry on March 9, 2006.

=== Later assistant career (2006–2021) ===
In the 2006–07 season, Perry was an assistant coach for the Indiana Pacers NBA team under Rick Carlisle. Perry remained with the Pacers from 2007 to 2011 in a different role as a talent scout; he also directed professional scouting for the NBA and NBA Development League in 2008.

Perry returned to coaching as an assistant coach at Southern Miss in the 2011–12 season, working again under head coach Eustachy. That season, Southern Miss finished 25–9 and appeared in the NCAA Tournament.

From 2012 to 2016, Perry was associate head coach at Colorado State under Eustachy. The 2012–13 Colorado State team appeared in the NCAA Tournament and had the program's first AP Top 25 ranking since the 1950s. Colorado State later appeared in the 2015 National Invitation Tournament.

In 2016, Perry became associate head coach for new head coach Damon Stoudamire at the University of the Pacific. He would serve in that position for five seasons. During Perry's tenure, Pacific improved from 11 wins in 2016–17 to 23 wins in 2019–20.

=== Pacific head coach (2021–2024) ===
On July 7, 2021, Pacific promoted Perry to head coach after Stoudamire resigned to be an assistant coach for the Boston Celtics. In the 2022–23 season, Pacific went 15–18 overall in Perry's second season as head coach as the team tied for 5th with a record of 7–9 in the WCC.

== Personal life ==
Perry has five children and is married to Christina Erickson, a native of Mullan, Idaho, who he met when they attended the University of Idaho.

== Head coaching record ==
Record table
Season	Team	Overall	Conference	Standing	Postseason
Idaho Vandals (Big West Conference) (2001–2005)
2001–02	Idaho	9–19	6–12	8th	
2002–03	Idaho	13–15	9–9	5th	
2003–04	Idaho	14–16	9–9	4th	
2004–05	Idaho	8–22	6–12	8th	
Idaho Vandals (Western Athletic Conference) (2005–2006)
2005–06	Idaho	4–25	1–15	9th	
Idaho:		48–97 (.331)	31–56 (.356)		
Pacific Tigers (West Coast Conference) (2021–2024)
2021–22	Pacific	8–22	3–11	8th	
2022–23	Pacific	15–18	7–9	T–5th	
2023–24	Pacific	6–25	0–16	9th	
Pacific:		29–65 (.309)	10–36 (.217)		
Total:		77–162 (.322)			
National champion Postseason invitational champion Conference regular season champion Conference regular season and conference tournament champion Division regular season champion Division regular season and conference tournament champion Conference tournament champion
