= Smith Spectrum =

Multi-purpose arena in Logan, Utah

Dee Glen Smith Spectrum
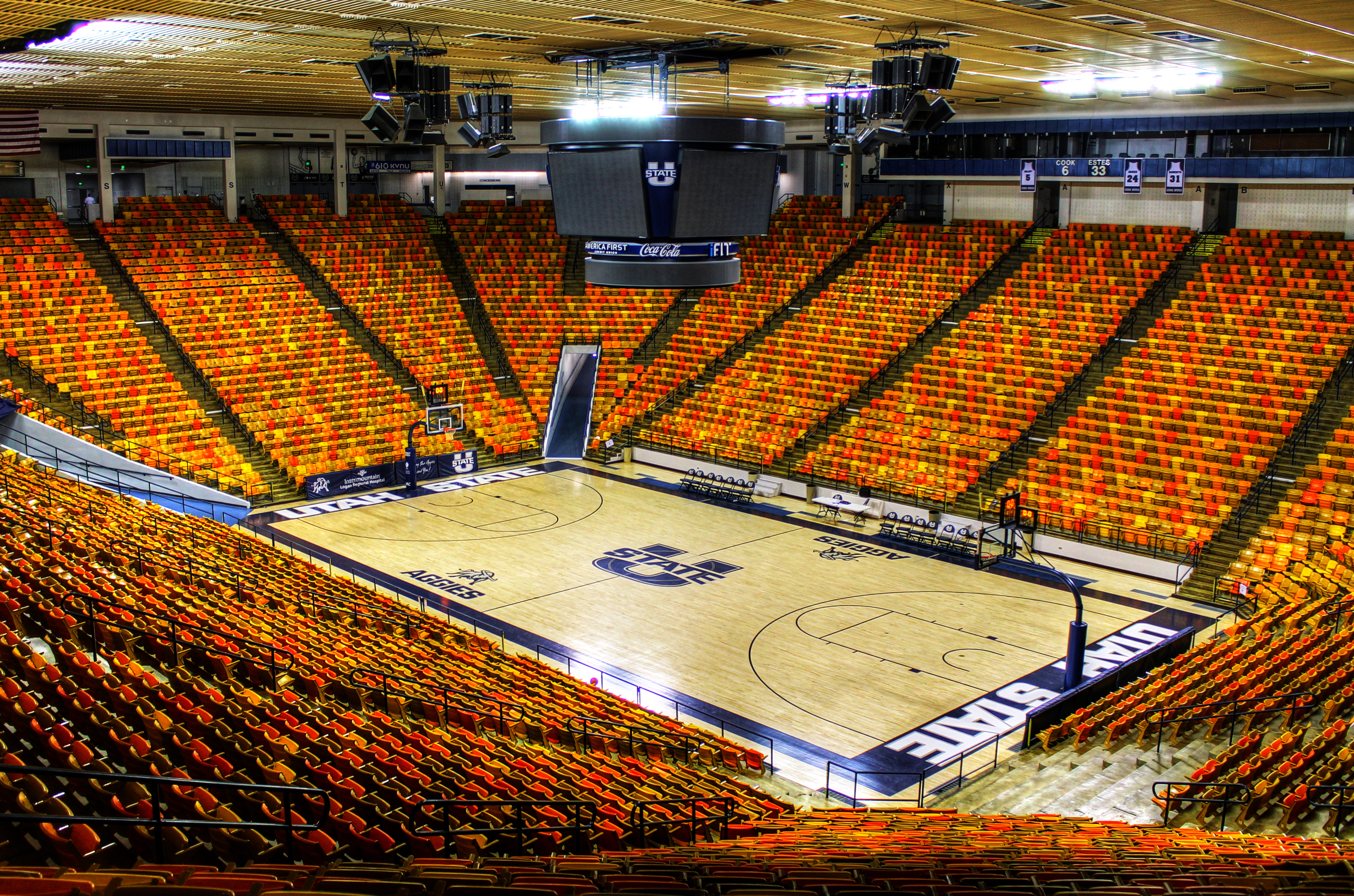
- Interior of the Dee Glen Smith Spectrum in 2013

- Location in the United States Location in Utah
- Former names: USU Assembly Center (1970–1971)
- Address: 900 East 900 North
- Location: Utah State University; Logan, Utah, U.S.
- Coordinates: 41.748°N 111.812°W
- Owner: Utah State University
- Operator: Utah State University
- Capacity: 10,270
- Surface: Hardwood

Construction
- Groundbreaking: 1968
- Opened: December 1, 1970; 55 years ago
- Cost: $3 million ($24.9 million in 2025)
- Architects: Folsom and Hunt

Tenants
- Utah State Aggies (NCAA) (Men's & Women's basketball, Women's volleyball, gymnastics)

The Dee Glen Smith Spectrum is a 10,270-seat multi-purpose arena in the western United States, located on the campus of Utah State University in Logan, Utah. Best known as the home of the Utah State Aggies men's and the women's basketball teams, it also hosts gymnastics, volleyball, and other sporting events. The elevation at street level is approximately 4,770 feet (1,450 m) above sea level.

In addition to sporting events, the Smith Spectrum is utilized for concerts, commencement ceremonies, and other special events central to the Cache Valley community. Originally known as the Assembly Center, the arena's first basketball game was 56 years ago on December 1, 1970, a 95–89 victory over Ohio State.

It became known as the Spectrum within the next year, and was named for Dee Glen Smith, founder of Smith's Food and Drug, whose contribution funded a 1988 renovation that added new offices for the athletics department and ticket office.

== Utah State Aggies men's basketball ==
Since the Spectrum's inaugural 1970-1971 season, through the 2018–19 season, the Aggies are a combined 588–140 (.808) at home.

In December 2005, the Utah State Aggies played their 500th game in the Spectrum. In those games, USU amassed a dominating record of 398 wins and 102 losses versus its competition.

Large crowds are another characteristic of the arena, as the Aggies have averaged better than 7,000 fans per game in 38 of their 42 seasons in the Smith Spectrum, and have averaged better than 8,500 fans per game every year since the 2007–08 season. A large part of the home court advantage comes from the USU student section, known as The Hurd.

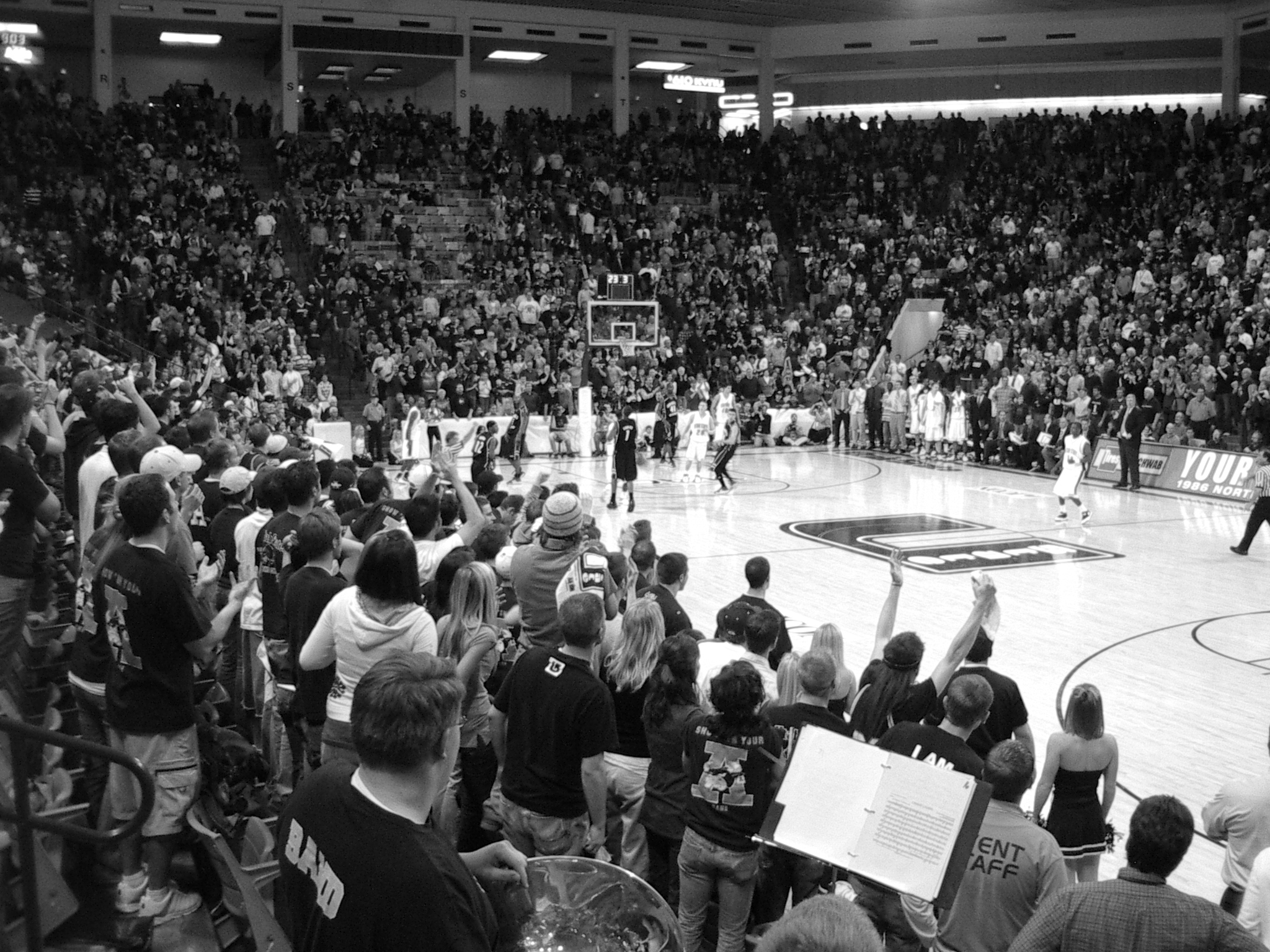
Student section of the Dee Glen Smith Spectrum during the 2006–07 season

On March 1, 1990, two former Utah State students set off a water bomb that soaked UNLV coach Jerry Tarkanian and other UNLV coaches and players with a blue-green dye. UNLV was awarded two technical free throws and made both of them. UNLV won the game by two points, 84–82.

Stew Morrill Era

From 1998 to 2015, head coach Stew Morrill amassed a home record of 248–32 (.886) over 17 seasons. In that same time period, the Aggies were 119–20 (.856) against league opponents and 125–12 (.912) in non-conference games at home. At the end of the 2008–09 season, Utah State held the second-longest home winning streak in the NCAA, having won 34 straight home games. The Aggies finished the 2007–08 season as well as the 2008–09 season with undefeated marks at home.

Records at the Spectrum

Overall: 621–147 (.809)

Stew Morrill era (1998–2015): 248–32 (.886)

Craig Smith era (2018–2021): 40–4 (.909)

Undefeated seasons (6): 1973–74 (14–0), 1997–98 (15–0), 2000–01 (15–0), 2007–08 (17–0), 2008–09 (17–0), 2010–11 (17–0)

Longest win streak: 37 (November 2007 – December 2009)

== See also ==
- List of NCAA Division I basketball arenas
