= Long Beach State Beach men's basketball statistical leaders =

The Long Beach State Beach men's basketball statistical leaders are individual statistical leaders of the Long Beach State Beach men's basketball program in various categories, including points, rebounds, assists, steals, and blocks. Within those areas, the lists identify single-game, single-season, and career leaders. The Beach represent California State University, Long Beach in the NCAA's Big West Conference.

Long Beach State began competing in intercollegiate basketball in 1950. The NCAA did not officially record assists as a stat until the 1983–84 season, and blocks and steals until the 1985–86 season, but Long Beach State's record books includes players in these stats before these seasons. These lists are updated through the end of the 2020–21 season.

== Scoring ==
Career
Rank	Player	Points	Seasons
1	Lucious Harris	2,312	1989–90 1990–91 1991–92 1992–93
2	Michael Wiley	1,962	1976–77 1977–78 1978–79 1979–80
3	Casper Ware	1,841	2008–09 2009–10 2010–11 2011–12
4	Ed Ratleff	1,758	1970–71 1971–72 1972–73
5	T.J. Robinson	1,718	2008–09 2009–10 2010–11 2011–12
6	Mike Caffey	1,649	2011–12 2012–13 2013–14 2014–15
7	Larry Anderson	1,538	2008–09 2009–10 2010–11 2011–12
8	Ramel Lloyd	1,527	1998–99 1999–00 2000–01
9	Craig Hodges	1,476	1978–79 1979–80 1980–81 1981–82
10	James Cotton	1,452	1993–94 1994–95 1995–96 1996–97

Season
Rank	Player	Points	Season
1	Lucious Harris	739	1992–93
2	Michael Wiley	697	1979–80
3	Ed Ratleff	660	1972–73
4	Donovan Morris	656	2007–08
5	James Cotton	634	1996–97
6	Deishuan Booker	622	2018–19
7	Ed Ratleff	621	1971–72
8	Nick Faust	609	2015–16
9	Devin Askew	604	2024–25
10	Aaron Nixon	601	2006–07

Single game
Rank	Player	Points	Season	Opponent
1	Marcus Tsohonis	46	2022–23	UC San Diego
2	Ed Ratleff	45	1970–71	Saint Mary's
	Gabe Levin	45	2017–18	UC Davis
4	Ed Ratleff	43	1971–72	Pacific
	Dick Nelson	43	1966–67	Cal Poly
6	John Rambo	42	1964–65	San Diego
	John Rambo	42	1963–64	San Diego
8	Ed Ratleff	39	1972–73	CS Los Angeles
	Gavin Sykes	39	2025–26	Cal State Bakersfield
10	Casper Ware	38	2011–12	Pacific
	Bill Florentine	38	1961–62	San Fernando State

== Rebounds ==
Career
Rank	Player	Rebounds	Seasons
1	T.J. Robinson	1,208	2008–09 2009–10 2010–11 2011–12
2	Francois Wise	896	1976–77 1977–78 1978–79 1979–80
3	Aboubacar Traore	853	2021–22 2022–23 2023–24
4	Michael Wiley	788	1976–77 1977–78 1978–79 1979–80
5	Ed Ratleff	710	1970–71 1971–72 1972–73
6	Lassina Traore	709	2022–23 2023–24
7	Bill Florentine	690	1959–60 1960–61 1961–62
8	Eugene Phelps	676	2008–09 2009–10 2010–11 2011–12
9	Lynn Hodge	637	1961–62 1962–63 1963–64
10	Temidayo Yussuf	607	2014–15 2015–16 2016–17 2017–18 2018–19

Season
Rank	Player	Rebounds	Season
1	Lassina Traore	362	2023–24
2	Dave Jones	358	1960–61
3	T.J. Robinson	347	2011–12
	Lassina Traore	347	2022–23
5	T.J. Robinson	344	2010–11
6	Bill Baron	334	1956–57
7	T.J. Robinson	332	2009–10
8	John Rambo	330	1964–65
9	Francois Wise	324	1979–80
10	George Trapp	313	1970–71

Single game
Rank	Player	Rebounds	Season	Opponent
1	Dave Jones	38	1960–61	CS Los Angeles
2	Dick Dickinson	28	1957–58	CS Los Angeles
3	Aboubacar Traore	23	2021–22	UC Riverside
4	Michael Zeno	22	1982–83	Loyola Marymount
	Aboubacar Traore	22	2023–24	Cal State Fullerton
6	Lassina Traore	20	2022–23	UC Davis
	Lassina Traore	20	2022–23	UC Irvine
	Aboubacar Traore	20	2021–22	Bethesda University
	Nate Stephens	20	1971–72	UC Riverside
	Ed Tucker	20	1965–66	CS Fullerton

== Assists ==
Career
Rank	Player	Assists	Seasons
1	Casper Ware	545	2008–09 2009–10 2010–11 2011–12
2	Billy Walker	507	1984–85 1985–86 1986–87 1987–88
3	Mike Caffey	457	2011–12 2012–13 2013–14 2014–15
4	Craig Hodges	437	1978–79 1979–80 1980–81 1981–82
5	Morlon Wiley	425	1984–85 1985–86 1986–87 1987–88
6	Kevin Houston	423	2003–04 2004–05 2005–06 2006–07
7	Ed Ratleff	410	1970–71 1971–72 1972–73
8	Larry Anderson	362	2008–09 2009–10 2010–11 2011–12
9	Justin Bibbins	343	2014–15 2015–16 2016–17
10	Lucious Harris	342	1989–90 1990–91 1991–92 1992–93

Season
Rank	Player	Assists	Season
1	Ed Ratleff	189	1971–72
2	Tyrone Mitchell	184	1989–90
3	Justin Bibbins	164	2015–16
4	Rick Aberegg	163	1973–74
5	Billy Walker	161	1985–86
	Aboubacar Traore	161	2023–24
7	Casper Ware	159	2009–10
8	Rasul Salahuddin	158	1994–95
9	Rick Aberegg	155	1972–73
10	Justin Bibbins	152	2016–17
	Bobby Sears	152	1991–92

Single game
Rank	Player	Assists	Season	Opponent
1	Rick Aberegg	15	1973–74	Northern Illinois
2	Aboubacar Traore	13	2023–24	UC Riverside
3	Deishuan Booker	12	2017–18	Nebraska
	Deishuan Booker	12	2017–18	Oregon State
	Tyrone Mitchell	12	1989–90	CS Fullerton
	Billy Walker	12	1985–86	Hawaii
	Billy Walker	12	1986–87	CS Fullerton
	Leonard Gray	12	1972–73	Colorado
	Ed Ratleff	12	1970–71	Temple
10	Devin Askew	11	2024–25	Cal State Northridge
	Deishuan Booker	11	2018–19	Bethesda
	Justin Bibbins	11	2016–17	UC Riverside
	Tyrone Mitchell	11	1989–90	New Mexico St.
	Ricky Smith	11	1982–83	Pacific
	David Johnson	11	1981–82	Vanderbilt
	Craig Hodges	11	1979–80	Pepperdine
	Dale Dillon	11	1975–76	Hawaii
	Dale Dillon	11	1974–75	San Diego State
	Rick Aberegg	11	1973–74	San Diego State
	Rick Aberegg	11	1973–74	UC Irvine
	Ed Ratleff	11	1971–72	UC Riverside
	Ed Ratleff	11	1971–72	UC Riverside

== Steals ==
Career
Rank	Player	Steals	Seasons
1	Larry Anderson	206	2008–09 2009–10 2010–11 2011–12
2	Casper Ware	205	2008–09 2009–10 2010–11 2011–12
3	Lucious Harris	200	1989–90 1990–91 1991–92 1992–93
4	Morlon Wiley	187	1984–85 1985–86 1986–87 1987–88
5	Mike Caffey	178	2011–12 2012–13 2013–14 2014–15
6	Ron Johnson	171	1998–99 1999–00 2000–01 2001–02
7	Jadon Jones	167	2020–21 2021–22 2022–23 2023–24
8	Rasul Salahuddin	163	1994–95 1995–96
9	Juaquin Hawkins	149	1992–93 1993–94 1994–95 1995–96
10	Antrone Lee	136	1997–98 1998–99 1999–00
	Billy Walker	136	1984–85 1985–86 1986–87 1987–88

Season
Rank	Player	Steals	Season
1	Rasul Salahuddin	101	1995–96
2	Morlon Wiley	74	1987–88
3	Casper Ware	69	2009–10
	Ron Johnson	69	2000–01
5	Tyrone Mitchell	66	1989–90
6	Antrone Lee	64	1997–98
7	Larry Anderson	62	2009–10
	Rasul Salahuddin	62	1994–95
9	Mike Caffey	61	2014–15
	Jadon Jones	61	2023–24

Single game
Rank	Player	Steals	Season	Opponent
1	Antrone Lee	10	1997–98	UC Irvine

== Blocks ==
Career
Rank	Player	Blocks	Seasons
1	Antrone Lee	128	1997–98 1998–99 1999–00
2	Aboubacar Traore	114	2021–22 2022–23 2023–24
3	Ivan Verberckt	110	1982–83 1983–84
4	Terrance O'Kelley	107	1991–92 1992–93 1993–94 1994–95
5	DeAnthony Langston	95	1984–85 1985–86 1986–87 1987–88
6	Jadon Jones	94	2020–21 2021–22 2022–23 2023–24
7	Dino Gregory	92	1980–81 1981–82
8	Eugene Phelps	81	2008–09 2009–10 2010–11 2011–12
9	Joshua Morgan	80	2019–20
10	Mason Riggins	78	2015–16 2016–17 2017–18 2018–19

Season
Rank	Player	Blocks	Season
1	Joshua Morgan	80	2019–20
2	Terrance O'Kelley	59	1993–94
3	Dino Gregory	56	1980–81
4	Ivan Verberckt	55	1983–84
	Ivan Verberckt	55	1982–83
6	Antrone Lee	51	1997–98
	Aboubacar Traore	51	2023–24
8	James Ennis	43	2012–13
9	Antrone Lee	42	1999–00
10	Aboubacar Traore	41	2021–22

Single game
Rank	Player	Blocks	Season	Opponent
1	Joshua Morgan	8	2019–20	CS Fullerton
2	Terrance O'Kelley	7	1993–94	Nevada
