= 1994–95 UNLV Runnin' Rebels basketball team =

American college basketball season

1994–95 UNLV Runnin' Rebels basketball

Orange Bowl Classic champion
- Conference: Big West Conference
- Record: 12-16 (7–11 Big West)
- Head coach: Cleveland Edwards; Howie Landa; Tim Grgurich
- Home arena: Thomas & Mack Center

1994–95 Big West men's basketball standings
	Conf.				Overall
Team	W		L	PCT	W		L	PCT
Utah State	14	–	4	.778	21	–	8	.724
New Mexico State	13	–	5	.722	25	–	10	.714
Long Beach State †	13	–	5	.722	20	–	10	.667
Nevada	12	–	6	.667	18	–	11	.621
Pacific	9	–	9	.500	14	–	13	.519
UC Santa Barbara	8	–	10	.444	13	–	14	.481
UNLV	7	–	11	.389	12	–	16	.429
UC Irvine	6	–	12	.333	13	–	16	.448
Cal State Fullerton	5	–	13	.278	7	–	20	.259
San Jose State	3	–	15	.167	4	–	23	.148
† 1995 Big West tournament winner Rankings from AP poll

The 1994–95 UNLV Runnin' Rebels basketball team represented the University of Nevada, Las Vegas. The team was coached by Cleveland Edwards, Howie Landa, and Tim Grgurich and played their home games at the Thomas & Mack Center on UNLV's main campus in Paradise, Nevada as a member of the Big West Conference.

On December 28, 1994, UNLV defeated Miami (FL) 56–55 in the Orange Bowl Basketball Classic at Miami Arena.

The Runnin' Rebels finished the season with a 12–16 record. On March 10, 1995, UNLV was eliminated from the Big West tournament by New Mexico State 96–76 in the 2nd round.
