= 1995–96 UC Irvine Anteaters men's basketball team =

American college basketball season

1995–96 UC Irvine Anteaters men's basketball

Joe Lapchick tournament champions
- Conference: Big West Conference
- Record: 15–12 (11–7 Big West)
- Head coach: Rod Baker (5th season)
- Home arena: Bren Events Center

1995–96 Big West men's basketball standings
	Conf.				Overall
Team	W		L	PCT	W		L	PCT
Long Beach State	12	–	6	.667	17	–	11	.607
Pacific	11	–	7	.611	15	–	12	.556
UC Irvine	11	–	7	.611	15	–	12	.556
Utah State	10	–	8	.556	18	–	15	.545
Nevada	9	–	9	.500	16	–	13	.552
San Jose State†	9	–	9	.500	13	–	17	.433
New Mexico State	8	–	10	.444	11	–	15	.423
UC Santa Barbara	8	–	10	.444	11	–	15	.423
UNLV	7	–	11	.389	10	–	16	.385
Cal State Fullerton	5	–	13	.278	6	–	20	.231
† 1996 Big West tournament winner Rankings from AP poll

The 1995–96 UC Irvine Anteaters men's basketball team represented the University of California, Irvine during the 1995–96 NCAA Division I men's basketball season. The Anteaters were led by fifth year head coach Rod Baker and played at the Bren Events Center and were members of the Big West Conference. They finished with their best record and only winning season under Rod Baker. Baker would win the Conference coach of the year.

== Previous season ==
The 1994–95 UC Irvine Anteaters men's basketball team finished the season with a record of 13–16, 6–12 in Big West play.

== Roster ==
1995–96 UC Irvine Anteaters men's basketball team
Players
Coaches

Pos.	#	Name	Height	Weight	Year	Hometown
C		Dan Augulis	6 ft 10 in (2.08 m)	—	Jr
F		Shaun Battle	6 ft 6 in (1.98 m)	—	Sr
G		Danny Fernandez	6 ft 4 in (1.93 m)	—	Sr
C		Paul Foster	6 ft 8 in (2.03 m)	—	Jr
G		Brian Keefe	6 ft 4 in (1.93 m)	—	So
G		Clay McKnight	6 ft 2 in (1.88 m)	—	Fr
G		Raimonds Miglinieks	6 ft 3 in (1.91 m)	200 lb (91 kg)	Sr	Riga (Latvia)
G		Andrew Navar	6 ft 3 in (1.91 m)	—	Fr
G		Lamarr Parker	6 ft 1 in (1.85 m)	—	Fr
C		Boris Reznik	6 ft 10 in (2.08 m)	—	Fr
F		Kevin Simmons	6 ft 8 in (2.03 m)	—	So
G		Ken Simpson	6 ft 3 in (1.91 m)	—	Jr
F		Michael Tate	6 ft 4 in (1.93 m)	—	Sr
G		Juan Toscanini	6 ft 0 in (1.83 m)	—	Fr

Head coach

Rod Baker (College of the Holy Cross)

Assistant coach(es)

Legend

- (C) Team captain
- (S) Suspended
- (I) Ineligible
- (W) Walk-on
- Injured
- Current redshirt

Roster

== Schedule ==
Date time, TV	Rank^{#}	Opponent^{#}	Result	Record	Site (attendance) city, state
Regular Season
November 24, 1995*		vs. Siena; Joe Lapchick Tournament	W 87–70	1–0	Alumni Hall (6,008); Queens, NY
November 25, 1995*		at St. John's; Joe Lapchick Tournament	W 83–77	2–0	Alumni Hall (6,008); Queens, NY
December 2, 1995*		at Oregon State	L 57–64	2–1	Gill Coliseum (3,851); Corvallis, OR
December 9, 1995*		Eastern Washington	W 86–66	3–1	Bren Events Center (1,523); Irvine, CA
December 16, 1995*		at USC	L 79–82	3–2	Los Angeles Memorial Sports Arena (2,931); Los Angeles, CA
December 21, 1995*		at San Diego	L 78–81	3–3	USD Sports Center (1,271); San Diego, CA
December 29, 1995*		Washington State	L 81–88	3–4	Bren Events Center (2,659); Irvine, CA
January 2, 1996		Pacific	W 72–54	4–4 (1–0)	Bren Event Center (1,189); Irvine, CA
January 4, 1996		San Jose State	W 78–70	5–4 (2–0)	Bren Event Center (1,880); Irvine, CA
January 10, 1996		at UC Santa Barbara	L 66–84	5–5 (2–1)	UC Santa Barbara Events Center (3,914); Santa Barbara, CA
January 13, 1996		at Cal State Fullerton	L 73–81	5–6 (2–2)	Titan Gym (1,327); Fullerton, CA
January 18, 1996		New Mexico State	W 74–66	6–6 (3–2)	Bren Event Center (2,056); Irvine, CA
January 20, 1996		UNLV	W 66–61	7–6 (4–2)	Bren Event Center (3,527); Irvine, CA
January 25, 1996		at Nevada	W 72–70	8–6 (5–2)	Lawlor Events Center (7,643); Reno, NV
January 27, 1996		at Utah State	W 78–72	9–6 (6–2)	Smith Spectrum (8,069); Logan, UT
February 1, 1996		UC Santa Barbara	W 74–62	10–6 (7–2)	Bren Events Center (3,446); Irvine, CA
February 3, 1996		Long Beach State	L 65–69 ^{OT}	10–7 (7–3)	Bren Events Center (5,006); Irvine, CA
February 6, 1996*		Southern Utah	W 85–75	11–7	Bren Events Center (1,497); Irvine, CA
February 10, 1996		Cal State Fullerton	W 85–75	12–7 (8–3)	Bren Events Center (3,336); Irvine, CA
February 12, 1996		at Long Beach State	W 84–81	13–7 (9–3)	The Pyramid (4,789); Long Beach, CA
February 17, 1996		at New Mexico State	L 77–83	13–8 (9–4)	Pan American Center (7,542); Las Cruces, NM
February 19, 1996		at UNLV	L 60–63	13–9 (9–5)	Thomas & Mack Center (7,855); Paradise, NV
February 24, 1996		Nevada	W 74–68	14–9 (10–5)	Bren Events Center (4,087); Irvine, CA
February 26, 1996		Utah State	W 81–76	15–9 (11–5)	Bren Events Center (4,261); Irvine, CA
February 29, 1996		San Jose State	L 70–81	15–10 (11–6)	Event Center Arena (2,002); San Jose, CA
March 3, 1996		at Pacific	L 74–80	15–11 (11–7)	Alex G. Spanos Center (3,465); Stockton, CA
Big West Conference tournament
March 9, 1996		vs. San Jose State; Semifinals	L 67–71	15–12	Lawlor Events Center (4,297); Reno, NV
*Non-conference game. ^{#}Rankings from AP Poll. (#) Tournament seedings in parentheses. All times are in Pacific Time.

== Awards and honors ==
- Rod Baker
  - Conference Coach of the Year
- Raimonds Miglinieks
  - Conference Player of the Year
  - Big West First Team All-Conference
- Brian Keefe
  - Big West Second Team All-Conference
- Kevin Simmons
  - Big West Second Team All-Conference
- Clay McKnight
  - Big West All-Freshman Team
