= 1996 Big West Conference men's basketball tournament =

- Classification: Division I
- Season: 1995–96
- Teams: 6
- Site: Lawlor Events Center; Reno, NV
- Champions: San José State (2nd title)
- Winning coach: Stan Morrison (1st title)
- MVP: Tariq Abdul-Wahad (San José State)

1995–96 Big West men's basketball standings
	Conf.				Overall
Team	W		L	PCT	W		L	PCT
Long Beach State	12	–	6	.667	17	–	11	.607
Pacific	11	–	7	.611	15	–	12	.556
UC Irvine	11	–	7	.611	15	–	12	.556
Utah State	10	–	8	.556	18	–	15	.545
Nevada	9	–	9	.500	16	–	13	.552
San Jose State†	9	–	9	.500	13	–	17	.433
New Mexico State	8	–	10	.444	11	–	15	.423
UC Santa Barbara	8	–	10	.444	11	–	15	.423
UNLV	7	–	11	.389	10	–	16	.385
Cal State Fullerton	5	–	13	.278	6	–	20	.231
† 1996 Big West tournament winner Rankings from AP poll

The 1996 Big West Conference men's basketball tournament was held March 8–10 at Lawlor Events Center in Reno, Nevada.

San José State defeated Utah State in the championship game in overtime, 76–75, to obtain the second Big West Conference men's basketball tournament championship in school history.

As a result, the Spartans were invited and participated in the 1996 NCAA Division I men's basketball tournament, making it the third time SJSU has appeared in the NCAA Division I men's basketball tournament. San José State was the only school in the Big West to appear in the NCAA Tournament.

== Format ==
For this season, no teams have disbanded nor joined the Big West Conference. However, the conference decided that six teams with the best conference records would play. As a result, Cal State Fullerton, New Mexico State, UC Santa Barbara, and UNLV did not participate.

Since six teams participated, the top two seeds, Long Beach State as No. 1 and UC Irvine as No. 2, were given Quarterfinals byes. The four other teams, Nevada, Pacific, San Jose State, and Utah State, competed in the quarterfinals.

== Bracket ==
Quarterfinals; Friday, March 8
6	San José State	77
3	Pacific	57
4	Utah State	70
5	Nevada	65

Semifinals; Saturday, March 9
6	San José State	71
2	UC Irvine	67
4	Utah State	86
1	Long Beach State	73

Championship; Sunday, March 10
6	San José State	76
4	Utah State	75
