= Rod Baker =

American professional basketball coach (born 1952)

Personal information
- Born: March 18, 1952 (age 74)

Career information
- College: Holy Cross (1970–1974)
- Coaching career: 1976–present

Career history

Coaching
- 1976–1977: Brown (assistant)
- 1977–1979: Columbia (assistant)
- 1979–1982: Saint Joseph's (assistant)
- 1983–1988: Tufts
- 1988–1991: Seton Hall (assistant)
- 1991–1997: UC Irvine
- 1997–2000: Cincinnati (assistant)
- 2000–2001: Rutgers (associate HC)
- 2002–2003: Grand Rapids Hoops
- 2003–2005: Harlem Globetrotters
- 2005–2012: Rochester Razorsharks
- 2012–2013: Bakersfield Jam (assistant)
- 2013–2014: Delaware 87ers
- 2021–2024: NBA G League Ignite (assistant)

Career highlights
- ABA champion (2006); 3× PBL champion (2008, 2009, 2011); Big West Coach of the Year (1996); ABA Coach of the Year (2006); 2× PBA Coach of the Year (2008, 2009)
Medals
Men's basketball
Representing United States
World University Games
Gold medal – first place	1993 Buffalo	Team competition
men's national basketball team
Assistant Coach for United States
Gold medal – first place	1995 Tokyo	Team competition

Rod Baker (born March 18, 1952) is an American professional basketball coach who last served as an assistant coach for the NBA G League Ignite of the NBA G League.

== College career ==
Baker played basketball at the College of the Holy Cross in Worcester, Massachusetts from 1970 to 1974. While playing, he earned a Bachelor of Arts Degree in English and was an Education Minor.

== Head coaching record ==
Record table
Season	Team	Overall	Conference	Standing	Postseason
Tufts Jumbos (New England Small College Athletic Conference) (1983–1988)
1983–84	Tufts	12–12	–		
1984–85	Tufts	15–10	–		
1985–86	Tufts	15–10	–		
1986–87	Tufts	14–11	–		
1987–88	Tufts	16–9	–		
Tufts:		72–52	–		
UC Irvine Anteaters (Big West Conference) (1991–1997)
1991–92	UC Irvine	7–22	3–15	9th	
1992–93	UC Irvine	6–21	4–14	8th	
1993–94	UC Irvine	10–20	4–14	10th	
1994–95	UC Irvine	13–16	6–12	8th	
1995–96	UC Irvine	15–12	11–7	2nd	
1996–97	UC Irvine	1–25	1–15	9th	
UC Irvine:		52–116	29–77		
Total:		124–168			
National champion Postseason invitational champion Conference regular season champion Conference regular season and conference tournament champion Division regular season champion Division regular season and conference tournament champion Conference tournament champion
