= 1992–93 UC Irvine Anteaters men's basketball team =

American college basketball season

1992–93 UC Irvine Anteaters men's basketball
- Conference: Big West Conference
- Record: 6–21 (4–14 Big West)
- Head coach: Rod Baker (2nd season)
- Home arena: Bren Events Center

1992–93 Big West men's basketball standings
	Conf.				Overall
Team	W		L	PCT	W		L	PCT
No. 24 New Mexico State	15	–	3	.833	26	–	8	.765
No. 25 UNLV	13	–	5	.722	21	–	8	.724
Pacific	12	–	6	.667	16	–	11	.593
Long Beach State †	11	–	7	.611	22	–	10	.688
UC Santa Barbara	10	–	8	.556	18	–	11	.621
Cal State Fullerton	10	–	8	.556	15	–	12	.556
Utah State	7	–	11	.389	10	–	17	.370
Nevada	4	–	14	.222	9	–	17	.346
San Jose State	4	–	14	.222	7	–	19	.269
UC Irvine	4	–	14	.222	6	–	21	.222
† 1993 Big West tournament winner Rankings from AP Poll

The 1992–93 UC Irvine Anteaters men's basketball team represented the University of California, Irvine during the 1992–93 NCAA Division I men's basketball season. The Anteaters were led by second year head coach Rod Baker and played at the Bren Events Center. They were members of the Big West Conference.

== Previous season ==
Under first year head coach Rod Baker, the 1991–92 UC Irvine Anteaters men's basketball team finished the season with a record of 7–22 and 3–15 in Big West play.

== Roster ==
1992–93 UC Irvine Anteaters men's basketball team
Players
Coaches

Pos.	#	Name	Height	Weight	Year	Hometown
F	9	Shaun Battle	6 ft 6 in (1.98 m)	—	Fr
C	2	DeForrest Boyer	6 ft 10 in (2.08 m)	—	Jr
F		Khalid Channell	6 ft 7 in (2.01 m)	—	So
F	4	Khari Johnson	6 ft 6 in (1.98 m)	—	Jr
F		Elzie Love	6 ft 6 in (1.98 m)	—	So
G	6	Lloyd Mumford	6 ft 2 in (1.88 m)	—	Jr
C		Uzoma Obiekea	6 ft 7 in (2.01 m)	—	Sr
F	7	LaDay Smith	6 ft 7 in (2.01 m)	—	So
G	8	Keith Stewart	5 ft 11 in (1.8 m)	—	Sr
F	9	Jeff Von Lutzow	6 ft 9 in (2.06 m)	—	Sr
G	10	Keith Walker	6 ft 5 in (1.96 m)	—	So
G		Todd Whitehead	6 ft 4 in (1.93 m)	—	Fr
G		Zuri Williams	6 ft 2 in (1.88 m)	—	So

Head coach

Rod Baker (College of the Holy Cross)

Assistant coach(es)

Legend

- (C) Team captain
- (S) Suspended
- (I) Ineligible
- (W) Walk-on
- Injured
- Current redshirt

Roster

== Schedule ==
Date time, TV	Rank^{#}	Opponent^{#}	Result	Record	Site (attendance) city, state
Regular Season
December 1, 1992*		at Boston University	L 76–79	0–1	Walter Brown Arena (1,861); Boston, MA
December 11, 1992*		vs. UMKC; Golden Harvest Classic	L 85–86	0–2	Kemper Arena (11,879); Kansas City, MO
December 12, 1992*		vs. Mississippi Valley State; Golden Harvest Classic	W 90–83	1–2	Kemper Arena (12,403); Kansas City, MO
December 19, 1992		at No. 22 UNLV	L 97–115	1–3 (0–1)	Thomas & Mack Center (14,727); Paradise, NV
December 28, 1992*		Southern California College; Disneyland Freedom Bowl Classic	W 111–77	2–3	Bren Events Center (3,218); Irvine, CA
December 30, 1992*		No. 10 Georgetown; Disneyland Freedom Bowl Classic	L 60–64	2–4	Bren Events Center (5,022); Irvine, CA
January 2, 1993*		at Tulane	L 78–86	2–5	Avron B. Fogelman Arena (3,500); New Orleans, LA
January 4, 1993*		at Houston	L 78–86	2–6	Hofheinz Pavilion (2,770); Houston, TX
January 7, 1993		Utah State	L 65–70	2–7 (0–2)	Bren Events Center (2,579); Irvine, CA
January 9, 1993		Nevada	L 67–71	2–8 (0–3)	Bren Events Center (2,002); Irvine, CA
January 16, 1993		Cal State Fullerton	L 59–61	2–9 (0–4)	Bren Events Center (3,784); Irvine, CA
January 23, 1993		at New Mexico State	L 67–72 ^{OT}	2–10 (0–5)	Pan American Center (8,919); Las Cruces, NM
January 28, 1993		Pacific	L 62–68	2–11 (0–6)	Bren Events Center (1,890); Irvine, CA
January 30, 1993		San Jose State	W 73–64	3–11 (1–6)	Bren Events Center (2,327); Irvine, CA
February 1, 1993		UC Santa Barbara	L 58–67	3–12 (1–7)	Bren Events Center (2,597); Irvine, CA
February 4, 1993		at Nevada	W 82–79	4–12 (2–7)	Lawlor Events Center (3,769); Reno, NV
February 6, 1993		at Utah State	L 70–81	4–13 (2–8)	Smith Spectrum (7,036); Logan, UT
February 13, 1993		at Cal State Fullerton	W 88–86 ^{OT}	5–13 (3–8)	Titan Gym (2,550); Fullerton, CA
February 15, 1993		UC Santa Barbara	L 67–85	5–14 (3–9)	UC Santa Barbara Events Center (3,528); Santa Barbara, CA
February 20, 1993		Long Beach State	L 74–88	5–15 (3–10)	Bren Events Center (3,401); Irvine, CA
February 22, 1993*		at Hofstra	L 67–77	5–16	Hofstra Physical Fitness Center (1,085); Hempstead, NY
February 25, 1993		at San Jose State	W 67–62	6–16 (4–10)	Event Center Arena (1,862); San Jose, CA
February 27, 1993		at Pacific	L 56–65	6–17 (4–11)	Alex G. Spanos Center (4,330); Stockton, CA
March 1, 1993		at Long Beach State	L 67–84	6–18 (4–12)	Gold Mine (1,194); Long Beach, CA
March 4, 1993		No. 16 UNLV	L 74–96	6–19 (4–13)	Bren Events Center (4,252); Irvine, CA
March 6, 1993		New Mexico State	L 74–76	6–20 (4–14)	Bren Events Center (2,660); Irvine, CA
Big West Conference tournament
March 12, 1993		vs. No. 24 New Mexico State; Quarterfinals	L 76–87	6–21	Long Beach Arena (2,500); Long Beach, CA
*Non-conference game. ^{#}Rankings from AP Poll. (#) Tournament seedings in parentheses. All times are in Pacific Time.

== Awards and honors ==
- Shaun Battle
  - Big West All-Freshman Team
