= Stan Morrison =

American retired college basketball coach and athletic director

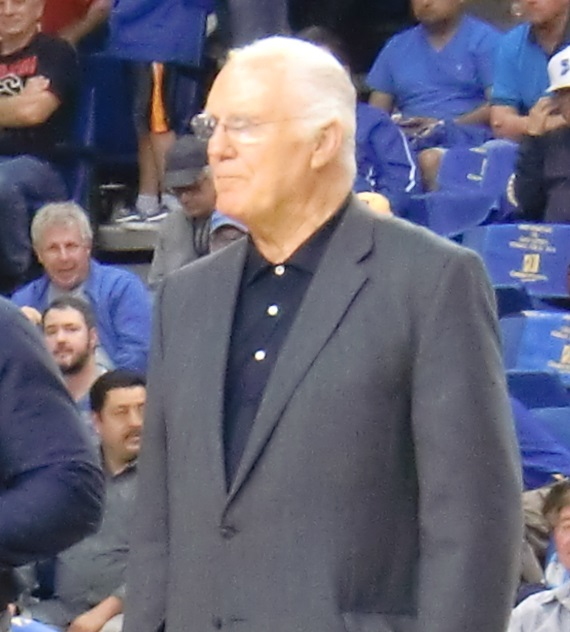
- Morrison in 2016

Biographical details
- Born: October 15, 1939 (age 86); Lynwood, California, U.S.

Playing career
- 1959–1961: California
- 1961–1962: Real Madrid
- Position: Center

Coaching career (HC unless noted)
- 1962–1963: California (GA)
- 1963–1966: El Camino HS
- 1966–1970: San Jose State (assistant)
- 1970–1972: USC (assistant)
- 1972–1979: Pacific
- 1979–1986: USC
- 1989–1998: San Jose State

Administrative career (AD unless noted)
- 1986–1989: UC Santa Barbara
- 1999–2011: UC Riverside

Head coaching record
- Overall: 275–353
- Tournaments: 0–4 (NCAA Division I)

Accomplishments and honors

Championships
- PCAA regular season (1979); 2× PCAA/Big West tournament (1979, 1996); Pac-10 regular season (1985)

Awards
- Pac-10 Coach of the Year (1985)

Stanley Mack Morrison (born October 15, 1939) is an American retired college basketball coach and athletic director. He was head men's basketball coach at the University of the Pacific in Stockton, California, from 1972 to 1979, University of Southern California (USC) from 1979 to 1986, and San Jose State University from 1989 to 1998.

From 1986 to 1989 Morrison was the athletic director for the University of California, Santa Barbara's 21-sport program, helped raise significant funds annually for the UC Santa Barbara Gauchos, and served on the NCAA Division I women's basketball tournament Committee. He was the athletic director at the University of California, Riverside for 12 years until his retirement on August 15, 2011.

== Early life and college playing career ==
Born in Lynwood, California, Morrison graduated from Bellflower High School. He then attended the University of California, Berkeley and played on the California Golden Bears varsity basketball team from 1959 to 1961 as a center. He was a member of the 1959 University of California, Berkeley NCAA Championship Basketball Team and a member of the 1960 University of California, Berkeley NCAA Runner-Up basketball team. Morrison averaged 10.8 points and 6.3 rebounds per game as a senior. graduated from UC Berkeley in 1961 with a bachelor's degree in physical education.

== Professional playing career ==
In the 1961–62 season, Morrison played professionally for Real Madrid Baloncesto, a team in the Spanish league. Real Madrid made the 1962 FIBA European Champions Cup Final. He was one of the first Americans to play European basketball. Morrison also was part of the San Francisco Olympic Club AAU Championship Tournament in 1963.

== Coaching career ==
In 1962, Morrison returned to UC Berkeley to be a graduate assistant on Rene Herrerias's staff. The following year, Morrison became varsity coach at El Camino High School in Sacramento, California. While coaching at El Camino, Morrison pursued a master's degree in physical education at Sacramento State College. Morrison received his master's in 1966, with the thesis The advantages and disadvantages in raising the height of the goal in basketball from ten feet to twelve feet.

After getting his master's degree, Morrison became an assistant coach at San Jose State under Dan Glines. Morrison recruited Darnell Hillman to San Jose State in 1967; Hillman would eventually play in the ABA and NBA. Morrison then moved to USC as an assistant coach under Bob Boyd. USC finished the 1970–71 season 24–2 and ranked #5 by the AP.

Stan Morrison is the only coach in NCAA history to lead three different basketball teams, in the same state, to the NCAA Tournament - University of the Pacific, University of Southern California and San Jose State University. Morrison won Coach of the Year honors in the Pacific Coast Athletic Association, the Pac-10 Conference and the Big West Conference.

=== Pacific ===
Morrison got his first collegiate head coaching position at the University of the Pacific in 1972; he would lead the Pacific Tigers men's basketball team for seven seasons. Morrison had a 100–88 record with Pacific, who finished Morrison's final season as head coach in 1978–79 first place in the Pacific Coast Athletic Association standings and made the 1979 NCAA tournament.

=== USC ===
Morrison then became head coach at the University of Southern California (USC) in 1979. He was head coach for seven seasons, until he was fired under a new athletic director in 1986. Morrison had been named the Pacific-10 Coach of the Year after the 1985 season. USC under Morrison made the 1982 and 1985 NCAA tournaments.

==== "Four Freshmen" ====
Hank Gathers and Bo Kimble were recruited to USC by Morrison and his top assistant, David Spencer. They were joined by high school All-American, Tom Lewis, and Rich Grande as the "Four Freshmen" star recruiting class. Following an 11–17 season coaching USC, Morrison and Spencer were fired after the 1985–86 season was over, despite winning the Pac-10 the previous year. It was reported that the players would not remain unless certain conditions were met, including having a say in the next coaching staff. USC hired George Raveling in March 1986 as the next head coach of the Trojans. Raveling gave the players a deadline to respond whether they would remain on the team. When they did not respond, he revoked the scholarships of Gathers, Kimble, and Lewis. Raveling's controversial statement was, "You can't let the Indians run the reservation," he said. "You've got to be strong, too. Sometimes you have to tell them that they have to exit." Kimble and Gathers transferred together from USC to Loyola Marymount. Lewis transferred to Pepperdine. Grande remained at USC.

=== UC Santa Barbara athletic director ===
Morrison accepted the position of Director of Intercollegiate Athletics at UC Santa Barbara in 1986, which involved overseeing a 21-sport program and serving as a member of the NCAA Women's Basketball Committee for 3 years.

=== San Jose State ===
Morrison returned to San Jose State to be head coach in 1989. Morrison inherited a team that went 5–21 under coach Bill Berry and had 10 players quit the team over accusations of verbal and physical abuse against Berry. In Morrison's first season, San Jose State went 8–20 in 1989–90 then finished the 1990–91 season 7–20. Following the 1990–91 season, Morrison dismissed four players from the team after they were arrested for stealing a student assistant's credit card.

After 2–24 and 7–19 seasons, San Jose State finished the 1993–94 season 15–12 for the Spartans' first winning season since 1986–87. Led by Olivier Saint-Jean, San Jose State then made the 1996 NCAA tournament after winning the Big West Conference men's basketball tournament. Saint-Jean later changed his name to Tariq Abdul-Wahad and was selected in the first round of the 1997 NBA draft. San Jose State moved from the Big West Conference to Western Athletic Conference for the 1996–97 season. Following a 3–23 season in 1997–98, Morrison resigned.

=== UC Riverside athletic director ===
In August 1999, Morrison became athletic director at the University of California, Riverside. At UC Riverside, Morrison led the university's upgrade from NCAA Division II to Division I. Morrison retired from the position on August 15, 2011.

== Post-university career ==
Morrison served on the NCAA men's basketball tournament committee from 2007-2011.

In 2011, Morrison took the position of senior vice president for Security Bank of California. In 2016, he became senior vice president for business development at Pacific Premier Bank.

== Awards ==
Morrison was the recipient of the 2016–17 Pete Newell Career Achievement Award at the University of California. The award is recognition for career achievement and is presented to a Cal men's basketball alumnus who has distinguished himself in his accomplishments while upholding the highest ideals of Coach Pete Newell and the University of California.

Morrison has also been awarded:

2011 Boy Scouts of America "Distinguished Citizen of the Year"

2012 Riverside Arts Council "Celebration Award"

2012 Riverside City Council Spirit Award"

2016 Riverside Greater Chambers of Commerce "Citizen of the Year"

2017 Ronald O. Loveridge "Distinguished Community Leader"

2018 Inducted into the California Sports Hall of Fame

2019 Appointed to the Ronnie Lott "Impact Award" Board

Stan Morrison is very involved in numerous Riverside non-profit organization boards including: Olive Crest, American Diabetes Association, ARC Riverside County, Mission Inn Foundation, High Five America, Boy Scouts of America, The 'Unforgettables', Riverside Downtown Partnership, Give Cancer the Boot, Riverside Downtown Business Council, Athletics Advisory Board Chair at La Sierra University, American Heart Association Heart Walk, March of Dimes, Make a Wish Foundation, Susan G. Komen- Race For The Cure, Mary S. Roberts Pet Adoption Center and Make-A-Wish Foundation, Co-Producer-"A Night With Alpin Hong", La Sierra University Foundation Chair, Riverside Philharmonic Board, Ronnie Lott- "Impact Award".

== Head coaching record ==
Record table
Season	Team	Overall	Conference	Standing	Postseason
Pacific Tigers (Pacific Coast Athletic Association) (1972–1979)
1972–73	Pacific	14–12	6–6	T–4th	
1973–74	Pacific	14–12	4–8	T–5th	
1974–75	Pacific	12–14	3–7	6th	
1975–76	Pacific	14–14	4–6	T–5th	
1976–77	Pacific	11–14	5–7	5th	
1977–78	Pacific	17–10	9–5	T–3rd	
1978–79	Pacific	18–12	11–3	1st	NCAA Division I second round
Pacific:		100–88	42–42		
USC Trojans (Pacific-10 Conference) (1979–1986)
1979–80	USC	12–15	5–13	T–7th	
1980–81	USC	14–13	9–9	4th	
1981–82	USC	19–9	13–5	3rd	NCAA Division I first round
1982–83	USC	17–11	11–7	5th	
1983–84	USC	11–20	6–12	8th	
1984–85	USC	19–10	13–5	T–1st	NCAA Division I first round
1985–86	USC	11–17	5–13	10th	
USC:		103–95	62–64		
San Jose State Spartans (Big West Conference) (1989–1996)
1989–90	San Jose State	8–20	5–13	8th	
1990–91	San Jose State	7–20	5–13	10th	
1991–92	San Jose State	2–24	1–17	10th	
1992–93	San Jose State	7–19	4–14	T–8th	
1993–94	San Jose State	15–11	11–7	T–2nd	
1994–95	San Jose State	4–22	3–15	10th	
1995–96	San Jose State	13–17	9–9	T–5th	NCAA Division I first round
San Jose State Spartans (Western Athletic Conference) (1996–1998)
1996–97	San Jose State	13–14	5–11	6th (Pacific)	
1997–98	San Jose State	3–23	1–13	8th (Pacific)	
San Jose State:		72–170	44–112		
Total:		275–353			
National champion Postseason invitational champion Conference regular season champion Conference regular season and conference tournament champion Division regular season champion Division regular season and conference tournament champion Conference tournament champion
