= Gillette College =

Community college in Gillette, Wyoming, U.S.

Coordinates: 44°15′42″N 105°29′59″W

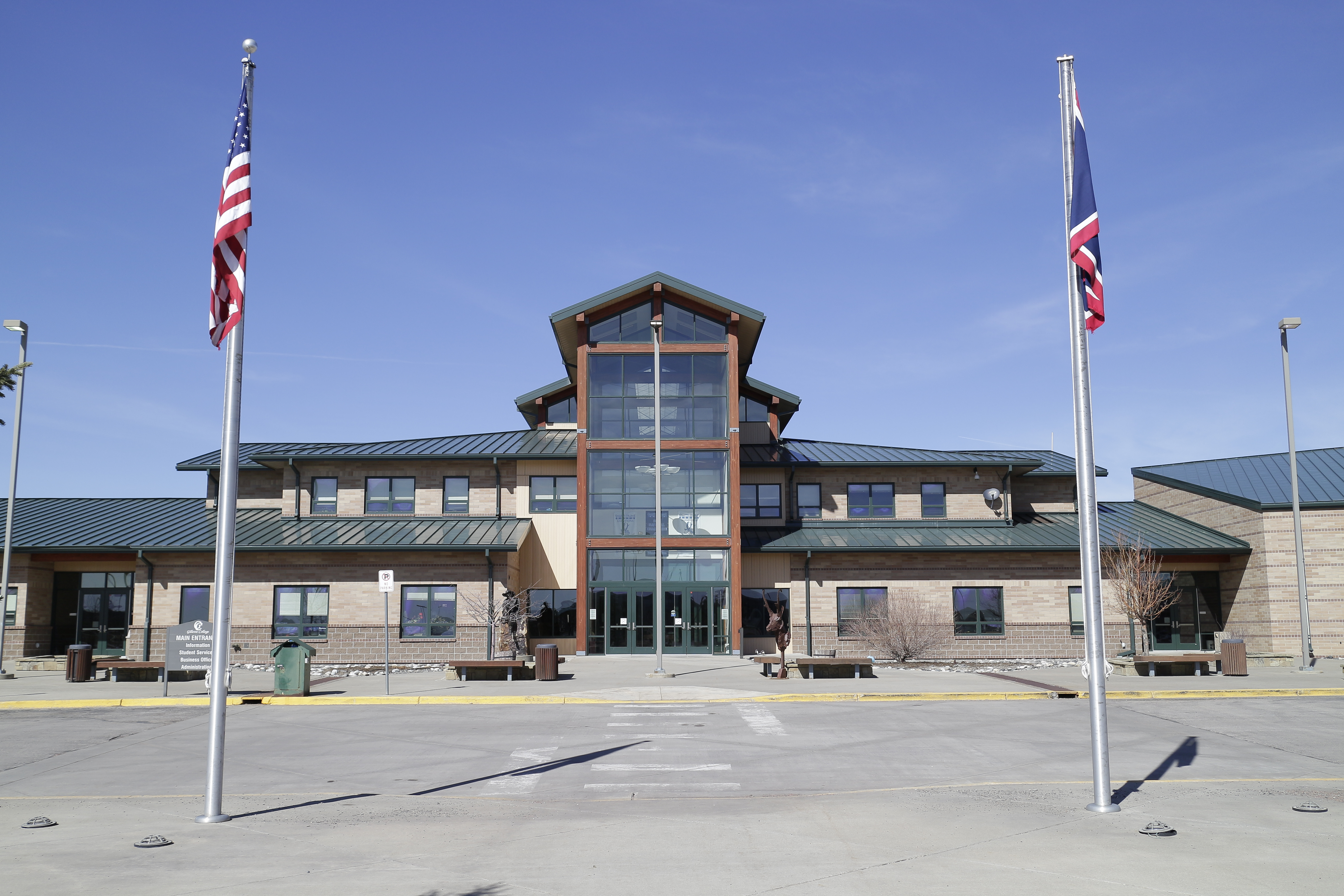
- Gillette College main building entrance
- Other names: Gillette Community College District, GCCD
- Type: Public
- Established: 1969; 57 years ago
- Endowment: $12,445,841 (2020)
- Chairman: Josh McGrath
- President: Janell Oberlander
- Students: 2,165
- Location: 300 West Sinclair Street, Gillette, Wyoming, United States
- Colors: Coal Black, Methane Blue and Wyoming Sky
- Nickname: Pronghorns
- Sporting affiliations: NJCAA Division I – Region 9 National Intercollegiate Rodeo Association – Central Rocky Mountain Region
- Mascot: Pronghorn
- Website: gillettecollege.org

Gillette College is a two-year community college in Gillette, Wyoming, United States. The college is the eighth and newest community college in the state of Wyoming, separating from the Northern Wyoming Community College District (NWCCD) in August of 2021. The newly formed independent community college is led by Chairman Josh McGrath and President Dr. Janell Oberlander. The college offers Associate of Arts and Associate of Science degrees, as well as certificate and applied science programs that prepare students for skilled trades such as welding and industrial electricity.

While the newly formed independent institution seeks its own accreditation, it remains partnered to NWCCD to offer accredited degrees and certifications to students.

== Academics ==
The estimated tuition for the 2018–19 year with 15 credits per semester was $12,439 for Wyoming residents, $13,567 for Western Undergraduate Exchange (WUE) students, and $16,951 for out-of-state and international students. The amount includes an average cost of books, supplies, and room and board. The cost per credit is $132 for Wyoming Residents, $179 for WUE students, and $320 for out-of-state and international students for the first 11 credits and begins to decrease ending with 18 credits costing $100 each.

The nursing program at the college started in January 1983 and it accepted 15 students a year to become licensed practical nurses (LPN). The program expanded to include training registered nurses (RN) in 1987. The nursing program currently accepts 32 students a year and in 2017, 244 people applied to enter the program which starts each year in the Fall.

== Student life ==
=== Athletics ===
As a member of the National Junior College Athletic Association, Gillette College is reestablishing their athletics program in Fall of 2023. Those sports include men's and women's basketball, men's and women's soccer, and volleyball in Region IX. The rodeo team was a member of the National Intercollegiate Rodeo Association.

=== Housing ===
Gillette College students have two choices for on-campus housing. A three-story residential hall called Inspiration Hall or Tanner Village, apartment-style suites.

=== Clubs and organizations ===
Gillette College has a show choir called Energy City Voices, a program that was cut along with athletics in 2020. The program returned to the institution in Fall of 2023. Energy City Voices is popular in Gillette, known for being a program with great choreography and pop-rock vocals.

== Notable alumni ==
- Deishuan Booker (born 1996), basketball player in the Israeli Basketball Premier League

== Gallery ==
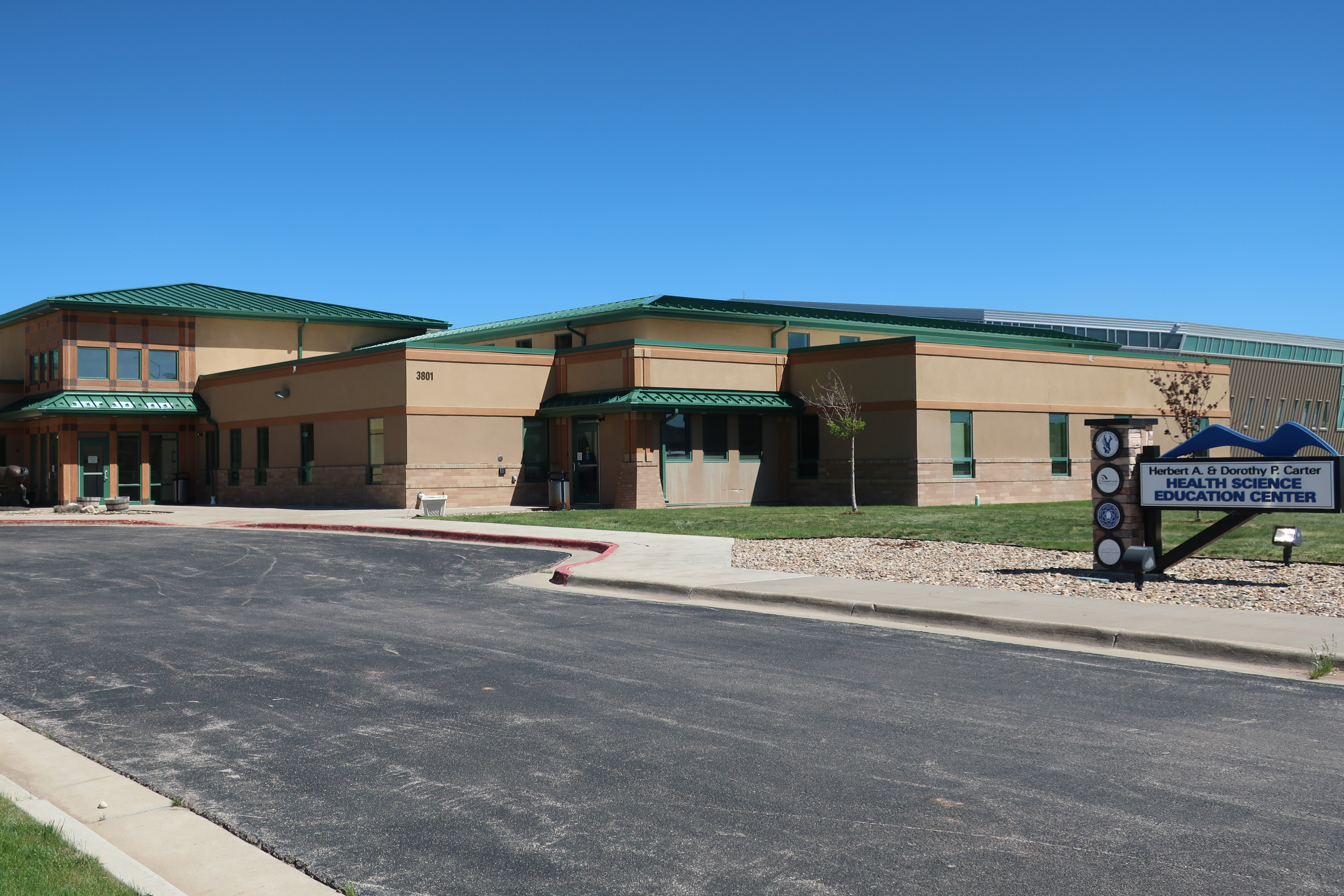
Health Science Education Center

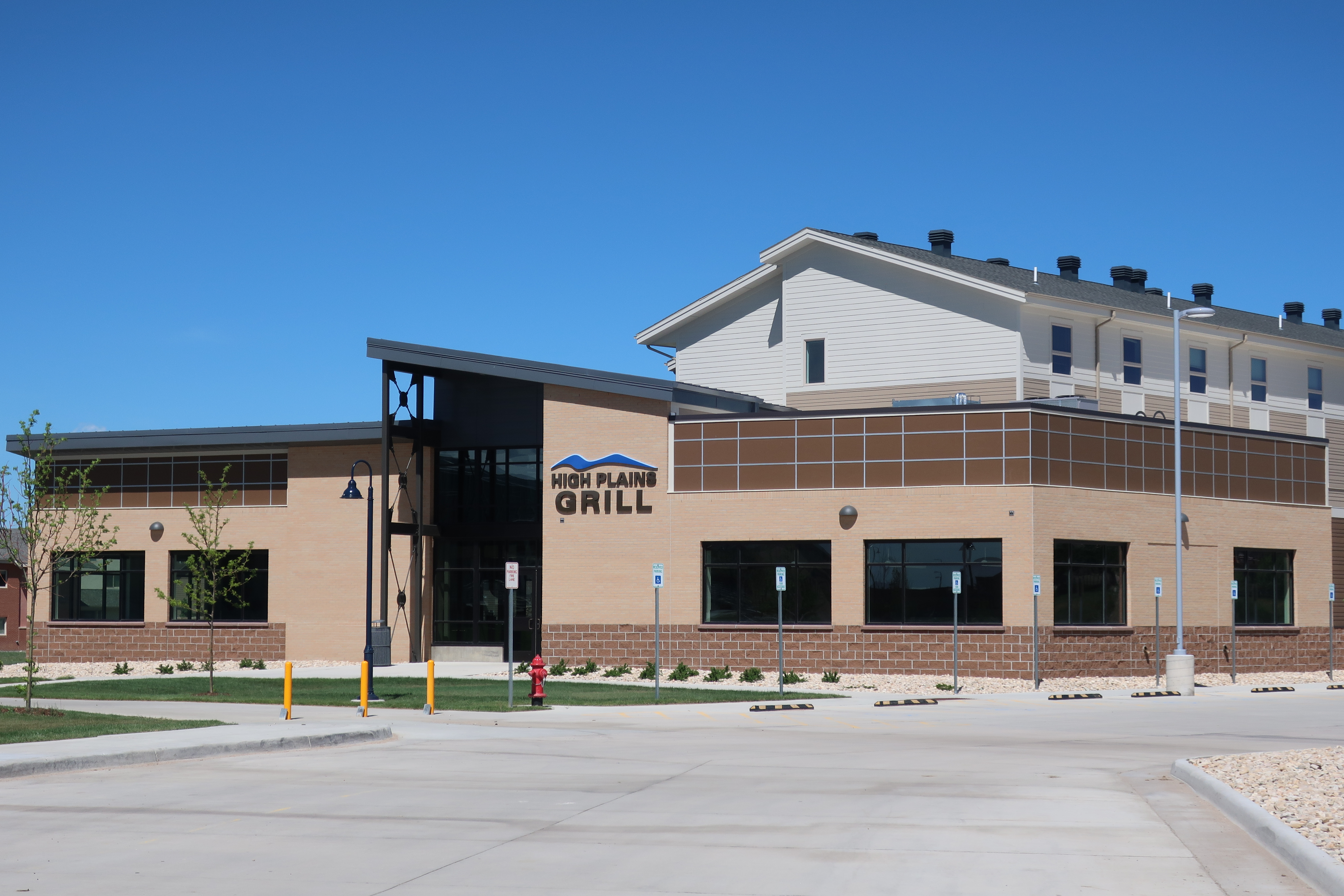
High Plains Grill

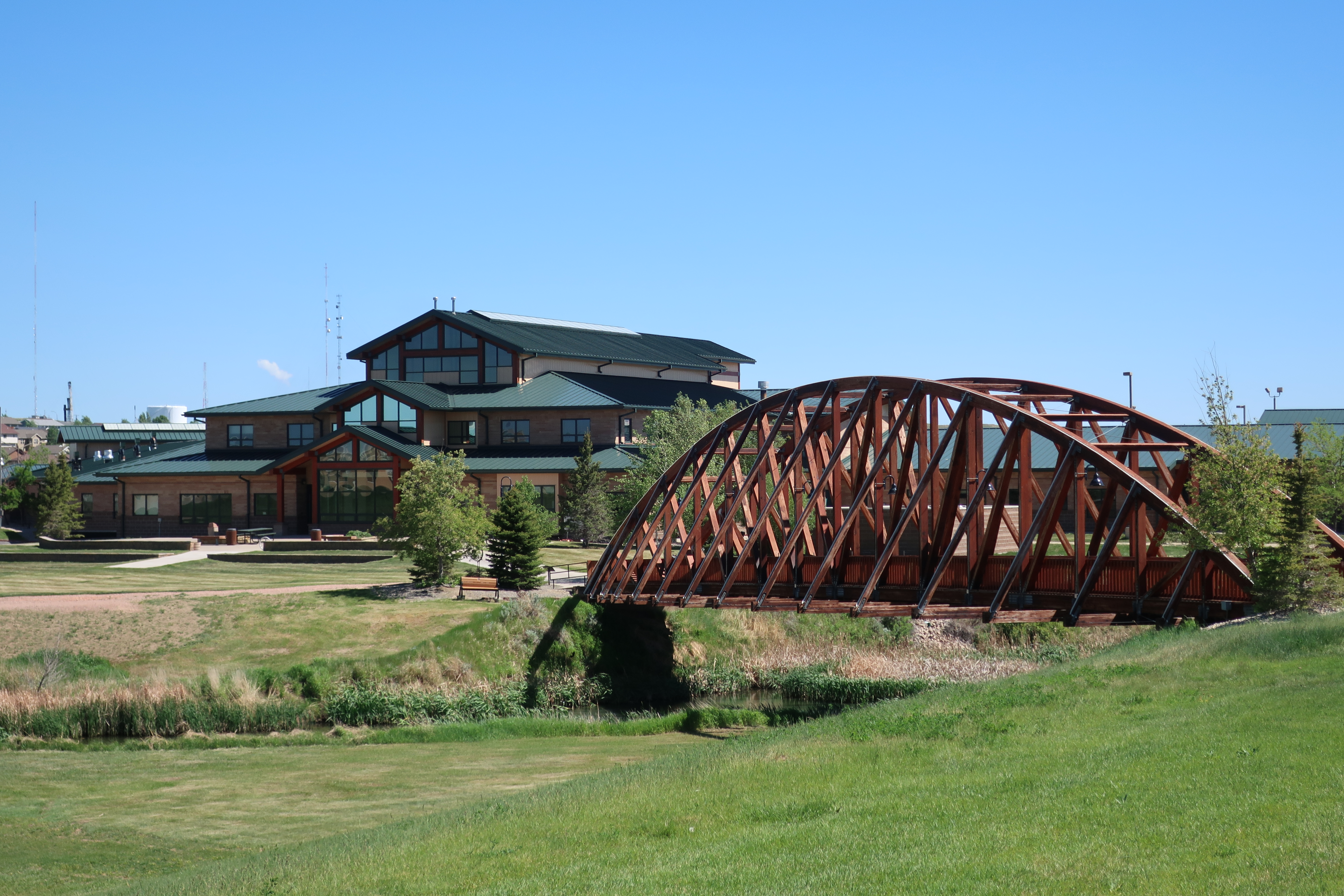
Rear of Main Building

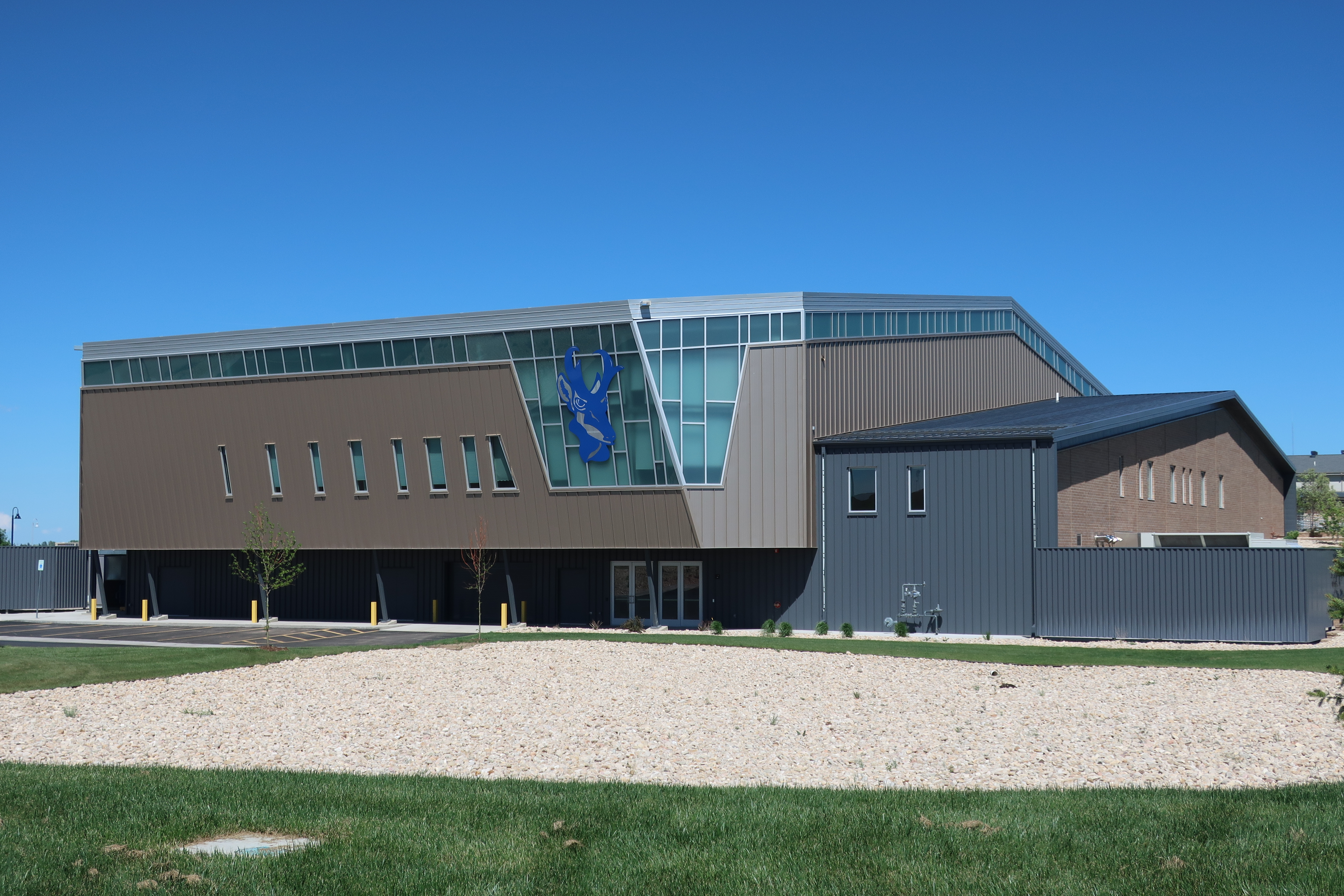
Pronghorn Center

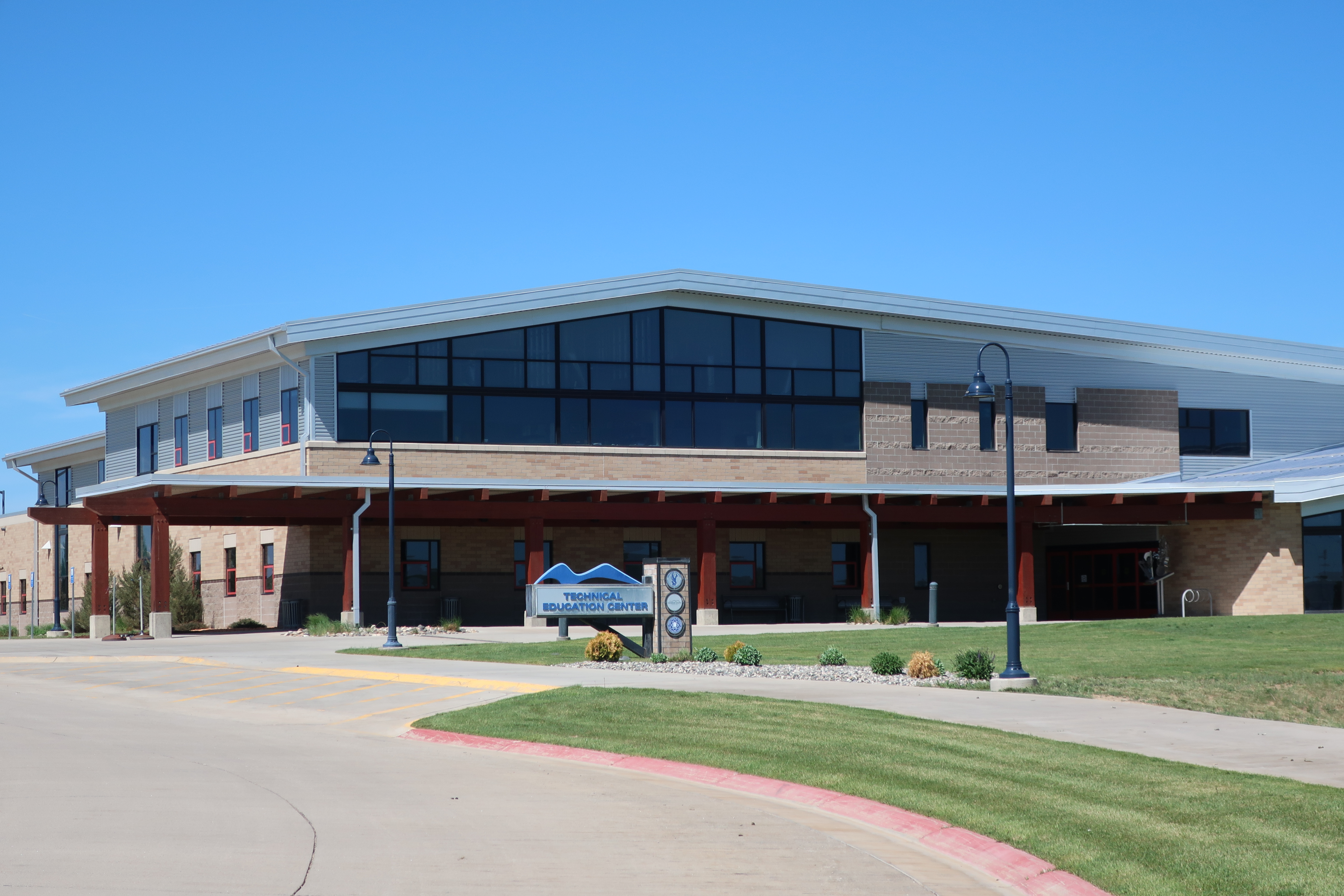
Technical Education Center

== See also ==
- Sheridan College
