= Seth Greenberg =

American basketball coach and analyst (born 1956)

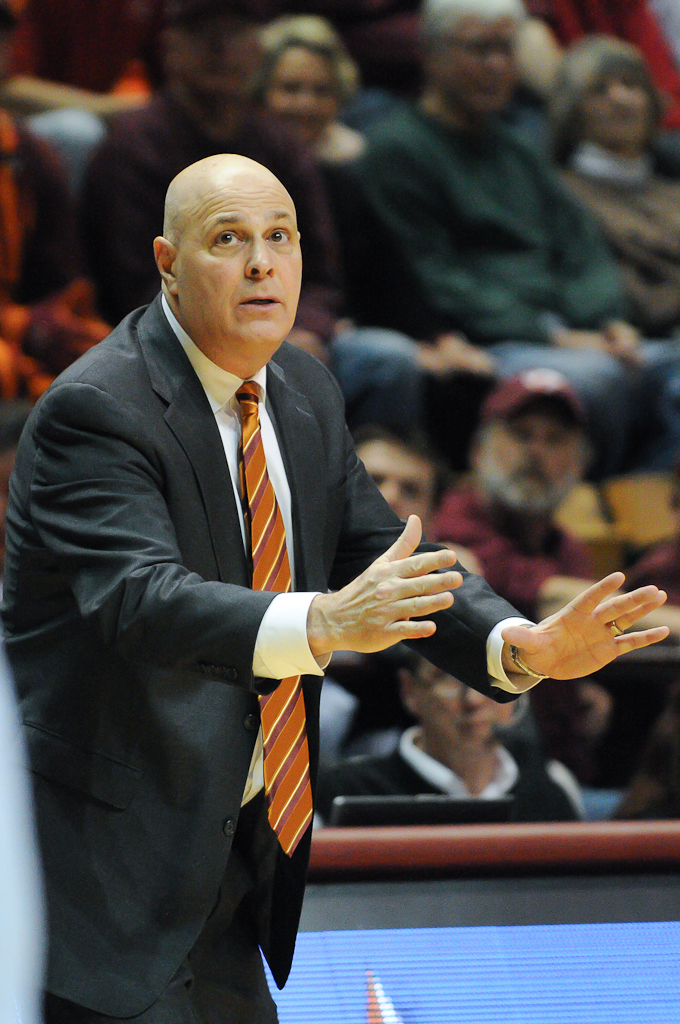
- Greenberg at Virginia Tech in 2012

Biographical details
- Born: April 18, 1956 (age 70); Plainview, New York, U.S.

Playing career
- 1974–1978: Fairleigh Dickinson

Coaching career (HC unless noted)
- 1978–1980: Columbia (assistant)
- 1980–1983: Pittsburgh (assistant)
- 1983–1984: Virginia (assistant)
- 1985–1987: Miami (FL) (assistant)
- 1987–1990: Long Beach State (assistant)
- 1990–1996: Long Beach State
- 1996–2003: South Florida
- 2003–2012: Virginia Tech

Head coaching record
- Overall: 383–293 (.567)
- Tournaments: 1–3 (NCAA Division I); 7–8 (NIT)

Accomplishments and honors

Championships
- 2 Big West tournament (1993, 1995); Big West regular season (1996)

Awards
- 2× ACC Coach of the Year (2005, 2008)

Seth Vincent Greenberg (born April 18, 1956) is an American college basketball broadcaster who works as an analyst for ESPN.

Prior to taking the position at ESPN he was a coach for 34 years, the last 22 as a head coach. Greenberg has been the head coach at Long Beach State, the University of South Florida, and Virginia Tech. He was a two-time ACC Coach of the Year.

== Early life and college playing career ==
Seth Greenberg is one of the three sons of Marilyn and Ralph Greenberg of Plainview, New York. Older brother Brad also became a college basketball coach.

After graduating from John F. Kennedy High School in Plainview in 1974, Greenberg attended Fairleigh Dickinson University in New Jersey. Lettering for four years in basketball under coach Al Lobalbo, Greenberg graduated in 1978 with a B.A. in broadcast journalism.

== Coaching career ==
=== Assistant coach at Columbia, Pittsburgh, Virginia, and the University of Miami (1978–87) ===
From 1978 to June 1980, Greenberg was an assistant coach at Columbia University under Buddy Mahar. Greenberg later joined Roy Chipman as an assistant coach at the University of Pittsburgh from 1980 to 1983. In that era, Pittsburgh appeared in the NCAA Tournaments of 1981 and 1982. For the 1983–84 season, Greenberg was an assistant on Terry Holland's Virginia team that made the Final Four of the 1984 NCAA tournament. Greenberg later worked as an assistant under Bill Foster at the University of Miami from 1985 to 1987.

=== Long Beach State associate head coach (1987–90) ===
In 1987, Greenberg became associate head coach at Long Beach State under Joe Harrington. Long Beach State appeared in the National Invitation Tournaments of 1988 and 1990.

=== Long Beach State head coach (1990–96) ===
Long Beach State promoted Greenberg to head coach in 1990. In six seasons with Greenberg as head coach, Long Beach State went 105–70, second behind Jerry Tarkanian for the most wins in the program's history. Postseason appearances during the Greenberg era included the 1992 NIT, 1993 NCAA tournament, and 1995 NCAA tournament.

In the 1992–93 season, Long Beach State also had its first Top 25 ranking in 14 years. On January 25, 1993, Long Beach State upset #1 Kansas 64–49 at Allen Fieldhouse. Long Beach State won the Big West tournament in 1993 and 1995.

While at Long Beach, Greenberg was a mentor of two successful future NBA players, Lucious Harris and Bryon Russell.

=== South Florida (1996–2003) ===
Greenberg was head coach at the University of South Florida from 1996 to 2003 and had a 108–100 record there. South Florida became the Conference USA regular season champions in the 1999–00 season and made the NIT after the season. South Florida also made the 2002 NIT.

=== Virginia Tech (2003–12) ===
In nine seasons at Virginia Tech, Greenberg attained a 170–123 record. Greenberg's tenure at Virginia Tech began with the school's final season in the Big East Conference before joining the Atlantic Coast Conference in 2004. Following his second season at Virginia Tech that included an appearance in the 2005 NIT, Greenberg won the ACC Coach of the Year award.

In 2005, he helped donate 2,400 student tickets to the NIT game against Temple. In 2008, he increased the donations to 3000 tickets for students in all three NIT games played in Cassell Coliseum.

During the 2006–07 season, Greenberg led the Hokies to a 22–12 record with signature victories against #5 Duke on the road and #1 North Carolina at home in an eight-day span. The victories landed the Hokies in the AP Top 25 for the first time in over a decade, and earned their first NCAA tournament appearance since 1996. They received a #5 seed in the West bracket, but fell to Southern Illinois in the second round.

Again in 2007–08, Virginia Tech had over 20 wins. Virginia Tech also made the quarterfinals of the 2008 NIT. Greenberg earned his second ACC Coach of the Year award.

On January 21, 2009 the Hokies defeated #1 Wake Forest, 78–71. Wake Forest was the only remaining undefeated team in the nation at the time. Virginia Tech made each NIT from 2009 to 2011 and had its most successful season under Greenberg in 2009–10 with a 25–9 record.

On February 27, 2011 the Hokies defeated #1 Duke in Cassell Coliseum.

Greenberg's tenure as Virginia Tech's head coach ended in April 2012, when Athletic Director Jim Weaver fired him at a surprise news conference. Greenberg was "completely blindsided and shocked" by Weaver's decision. Greenberg was replaced by his former assistant, James Johnson.

Greenberg is Jewish, and volunteered to coach the USA Men's Basketball team at the 19th Maccabiah Games in Israel in July 2013.

=== Awards ===
Greenberg was inducted into The National Jewish Sports Hall of Fame and Museum in 2012, and the Long Beach State Hall of Fame in 2013. In 1996 he was inducted into the Southern California Jewish Sports Hall of Fame.

== Broadcasting career ==
Greenberg is a college basketball analyst for ESPN.

== Head coaching record ==
Record table
Season	Team	Overall	Conference	Standing	Postseason
Long Beach State 49ers (Big West Conference) (1990–1996)
1990–91	Long Beach State	11–17	7–11	T–6th	
1991–92	Long Beach State	18–12	11–7	4th	NIT first round
1992–93	Long Beach State	22–10	11–7	4th	NCAA Division I First Round
1993–94	Long Beach State	17–10	11–7	T–2nd	
1994–95	Long Beach State	20–10	13–5	T–2nd	NCAA Division I First Round
1995–96	Long Beach State	17–11	12–6	1st	
Long Beach State:		105–70 (.600)	65–43 (.602)		
South Florida Bulls (Conference USA) (1996–2003)
1996–97	South Florida	8–19	2–12	4th (Red)	
1997–98	South Florida	17–13	7–9	4th (National)	
1998–99	South Florida	14–14	6–10	T–2nd (National)	
1999–00	South Florida	17–14	8–8	T–1st (National)	NIT first round
2000–01	South Florida	18–13	9–7	3rd (National)	
2001–02	South Florida	19–13	8–8	3rd (National)	NIT first round
2002–03	South Florida	15–14	7–9	4th (National)	
South Florida:		108–100 (.519)	47–63 (.427)		
Virginia Tech Hokies (Big East Conference) (2003–2004)
2003–04	Virginia Tech	15–14	7–9	T–8th	
Virginia Tech Hokies (Atlantic Coast Conference) (2004–2012)
2004–05	Virginia Tech	16–14	8–8	T–4th	NIT second round
2005–06	Virginia Tech	14–16	4–12	T–10th	
2006–07	Virginia Tech	22–12	10–6	T–3rd	NCAA Division I Second Round
2007–08	Virginia Tech	21–14	9–7	4th	NIT quarterfinal
2008–09	Virginia Tech	19–15	7–9	T–7th	NIT second round
2009–10	Virginia Tech	25–9	10–6	T–3rd	NIT quarterfinal
2010–11	Virginia Tech	22–12	9–7	T–4th	NIT second round
2011–12	Virginia Tech	16–17	4–12	9th	
Virginia Tech:		170–123 (.580)	68–76 (.472)		
Total:		383–293 (.567)			
National champion Postseason invitational champion Conference regular season champion Conference regular season and conference tournament champion Division regular season champion Division regular season and conference tournament champion Conference tournament champion
