= 1995–96 San Jose State Spartans men's basketball team =

American college basketball season

1995–96 San Jose State Spartans men's basketball
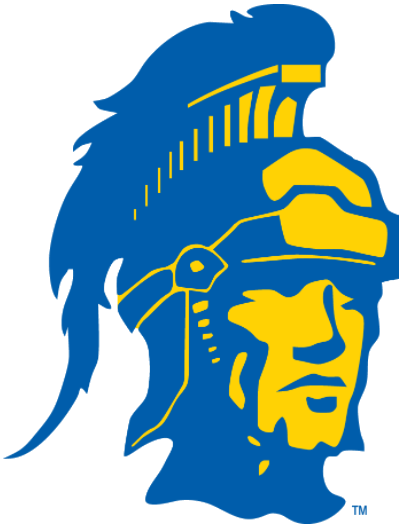

Big West tournament champions

NCAA tournament, First Round
- Conference: Big West Conference
- Record: 13–17 (9–9 Big West)
- Head coach: Stan Morrison (7th season)
- Home arena: Event Center Arena (Capacity: 5,000)

1995–96 Big West men's basketball standings
	Conf.				Overall
Team	W		L	PCT	W		L	PCT
Long Beach State	12	–	6	.667	17	–	11	.607
Pacific	11	–	7	.611	15	–	12	.556
UC Irvine	11	–	7	.611	15	–	12	.556
Utah State	10	–	8	.556	18	–	15	.545
Nevada	9	–	9	.500	16	–	13	.552
San Jose State†	9	–	9	.500	13	–	17	.433
New Mexico State	8	–	10	.444	11	–	15	.423
UC Santa Barbara	8	–	10	.444	11	–	15	.423
UNLV	7	–	11	.389	10	–	16	.385
Cal State Fullerton	5	–	13	.278	6	–	20	.231
† 1996 Big West tournament winner Rankings from AP poll

The 1995–96 San Jose State Spartans men's basketball team represented San Jose State University during the 1995–96 NCAA Division I men's basketball season. The Spartans were led by seventh-year head coach Stan Morrison and played their home games at the Event Center Arena. SJSU was a member of the Big West Conference.

The Spartans finished the season 13–17 overall, and 9–9 in the conference. During the season, San José State was invited and participated in the Illini Classic in Champaign, Illinois. San José State lost to Ball State and Southeast Missouri State to earn 4th place. In the postseason, San José State defeated Pacific, UC Irvine, and Utah State in the 1996 Big West Conference Men's Basketball Tournament to earn 1st place in Reno, Nevada. The Spartans were invited and participated in the 1996 NCAA Division I men's basketball tournament, where they lost to Kentucky in Dallas, Texas in the first round.

== Roster ==
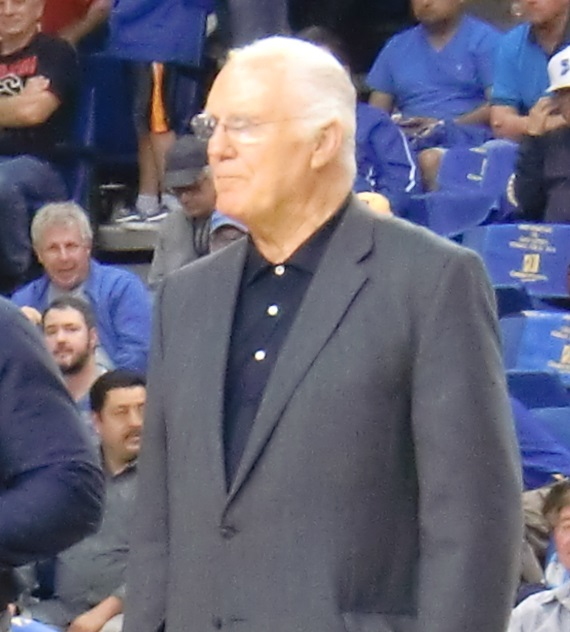
Stan Morrison, alumnus of California, was the Spartans' head coach in 1995–96

1995–96 San José State Spartans roster
Name	#	Position	Height	Year
Tariq Abdul-Wahad	3	Forward	6–6	Sophomore
Sam Allen	5	Forward	6–7	Senior
Roy Hammonds	32	Center	6–7	Senior
Tito Addison	12	Guard	6–0	Junior
Marmet Williams	21	Forward	6–4	Sophomore
Rich Taylor	35	Center	6–9	Sophomore
Darren Greene	41	Forward	6–6	Senior
Jahi Bacon	14	Guard	6–3	Junior
LaRon Campbell-Hall	11	Guard	6–1	Sophomore
Terence Wilborn	24	Forward	6–6	Junior
Ken Kavanagh	50	Center	6–9	Freshman
Craig Clark	52	Center	6–10	Freshman
Brad Quinet	31	Guard	6–2	Senior

== Schedule ==
Date time, TV	Rank^{#}	Opponent^{#}	Result	Record	Site city, state
Non-conference regular season
November 28, 1995*		Saint Mary's	L 60–61	0–1	Event Center Arena; San Jose, CA
December 1, 1995*		Santa Clara	L 51–79	0–2	Event Center Arena; San Jose, CA
December 5, 1995*		at Fresno State; Rivalry	L 68–92	0–3	Selland Arena; Fresno, CA
December 8, 1995*		vs. Ball State; Illini Classic	L 64–80	0–4	Assembly Hall; Champaign, IL
December 9, 1995*		vs. Southeast Missouri State; Illini Classic	L 48–55	0–5	Assembly Hall; Champaign, IL
December 20, 1995*		Portland	W 87–79	1–5	Event Center Arena; San Jose, CA
December 23, 1995*		Pepperdine	L 76–80	1–6	Event Center Arena; San Jose, CA
December 27, 1995*		Washington State	L 74–90	1–7	Event Center Arena; San Jose, CA
Big West regular season
January 2, 1996		at Cal State Fullerton	W 88–77	2–7 (1–0)	Titan Gym; Fullerton, CA
January 4, 1996		at UC Irvine	L 70–78	2–8 (1–1)	Bren Events Center; Irvine, CA
January 8, 1996		New Mexico State	W 74–60	3–8 (2–1)	Event Center Arena; San Jose, CA
January 10, 1996		UNLV	W 66–64	4–8 (3–1)	Event Center Arena; San Jose, CA
January 13, 1996		at Nevada	L 64–83	4–9 (3–2)	Lawlor Events Center; Reno, NV
January 15, 1996		at Utah State	L 58–60	4–10 (3–3)	Smith Spectrum; Logan, UT
January 20, 1996		at Pacific	L 60–81	4–11 (3–4)	Alex G. Spanos Center; Stockton, CA
January 25, 1996		Long Beach State	L 63–76	4–12 (3–5)	Event Center Arena; San Jose, CA
January 27, 1996		UC Santa Barbara	L 77–80	4–13 (3–6)	Event Center Arena; San Jose, CA
February 1, 1996		at UNLV	L 75–84	4–14 (3–7)	Thomas & Mack Center; Las Vegas, NV
February 3, 1996		at New Mexico State	L 73–74	4–15 (3–8)	Pan American Center; Las Cruces, NM
February 8, 1996		Utah State	W 68–65	5–15 (4–8)	Event Center Arena; San Jose, CA
February 10, 1996		Nevada	W 96–91	6–15 (5–8)	Event Center Arena; San Jose, CA
February 17, 1996		Pacific	W 79–73	7–15 (6–8)	Event Center Arena; San Jose, CA
February 22, 1996		at UC Santa Barbara	W 69–66	8–15 (7–8)	The Thunderdome; Santa Barbara, CA
February 24, 1996		at Long Beach State	L 86–105	8–16 (7–9)	Walter Pyramid; Long Beach, CA
February 29, 1996		UC Irvine	W 81–70	9–16 (8–9)	Event Center Arena; San Jose, CA
March 3, 1996		Cal State Fullerton	W 90–80	10–16 (9–9)	Event Center Arena; San Jose, CA
Big West tournament
March 8, 1996	(6)	vs. (3) Pacific; Quarterfinals	W 77–57	11–16	Lawlor Events Center; Reno, NV
March 9, 1996	(6)	vs. (2) UC Irvine; Semifinals	W 71–67	12–16	Lawlor Events Center; Reno, NV
March 10, 1996	(6)	vs. (4) Utah State; Championship	W 76–75 ^{OT}	13–16	Lawlor Events Center; Reno, NV
NCAA tournament
March 14, 1996	(MW 16)	vs. (MW 1) No. 2 Kentucky; First Round	L 72–110	13–17	Reunion Arena; Dallas, TX
*Non-conference game. ^{#}Rankings from AP Poll. (#) Tournament seedings in parentheses. All times are in Pacific Time.
