= Buddy Mahar =

American basketball coach

Biographical details
- Born: April 29, 1945 (age 81)
- Education: Boston State

Coaching career (HC unless noted)
- 1970–1973: Newbury
- 1974–1976: Notre Dame Prep
- 1976–1978: Columbia (asst.)
- 1978–1984: Columbia
- 1984–1986: Fordham (asst.)
- 1989–1992: FDU (women's asst.)
- 1992–1995: Johnson State
- 1995–1996: Vermont (asst.)
- 2004–2005: SUNY Cortland (asst.)

Head coaching record
- Overall: 198–134 (.596)

Arthur "Buddy" Mahar (born April 29, 1945) is an American former college basketball coach. He most notably was the head coach of the Columbia Lions men's basketball team from 1978 to 1984.

== Coaching career ==
After graduation from Boston State College (now UMass Boston), Mahar became the head coach at Newbury College, then a junior college in Brookline, Massachusetts, where he guided the team to an 88–14 record from 1970 to 1973, before moving on to be the head coach at Notre Dame Prepparatory School in Fitchburg, Massachusetts from 1976 to 1978.

In 1978, Mahar joined Tom Penders staff at Columbia as an assistant coach and freshman coach, and replaced Penders when he left for Fordham to become 18th head coach in Lions history. In his six seasons at the helm, Mahar guided Columbia to a 70-86 overall record including two second-place finishes in 1978-79 and 1981–82. He was awarded NABC District II Coach of the Year honors in 1982 for guiding the Lions to a 16–10 season. While at Columbia, future college head coaches like Seth Greenberg served under Mahar.

After being fired at Columbia at the conclusion of the 1983–84 season, Mahar reunited with Penders, and joined his Fordham staff as an assistant coach from 1984 to 1986. After not being retained when Penders took the Rhode Island job, Mahar sat out of coaching in an attempt to sue Fordham for a breach of contract.

Mahar returned to coaching, joining the Fairleigh Dickinson Knights women's basketball team as an assistant coach in 1989. Mahar was part of a historic season for the Knights, as the 1991-92 team captured the Northeast Conference tournament title, which was later honored in the FDU Athletic Hall of Fame.

In 1993, Mahar accepted the head coaching job at Johnson State College in Vermont, where he spent three seasons as the head coach, and compiled a 44–34 record from 1992 to 1995, leading the Badgers to a Mayflower Conference championship in 1995 while also being named 1995 Mayflower Coach of the Year. Mahar ranks third all-time in wins at Johnson State.

After Johnson State, Mahar served as an assistant coach for one season under Tom Brennan at Vermont. He then relocated to Cortland, New York and was an assistant coach during the 2004–05 season at SUNY Cortland.

== Personal ==
Mahar's son Matt, who played for him at Johnson State, is a college basketball coach and has served as the head coach at Chaminade and Assumption College. His younger son Eamonn is currently an assistant coach at Bryant.

== Head coaching record ==
Record table
Season	Team	Overall	Conference	Standing	Postseason
Columbia (Ivy League) (1978–1984)
1978–79	Columbia	17–9	10–4	2nd	
1979–80	Columbia	10–16	5–9	6th	
1980–81	Columbia	9–17	5–9	4th	
1981–82	Columbia	16–10	9–5	2nd	
1982–83	Columbia	10–16	7–7	T–3rd	
1983–84	Columbia	8–18	5–9	7th	
Columbia:		70–86 (.449)	41–43 (.488)		
Johnson State (Mayflower Conference) (1992–1995)
1992–93	Johnson State	13–12	N/A	N/A	
1993–94	Johnson State	16–11	N/A	N/A	
1994–95	Johnson State	15–11	N/A	N/A	
Johnson State:		44–34 (.564)			
Total:		114–120 (.487)			
National champion Postseason invitational champion Conference regular season champion Conference regular season and conference tournament champion Division regular season champion Division regular season and conference tournament champion Conference tournament champion
