= Ivan Verberckt =

Belgian basketball player

Personal information
- Born: 4 October 1962 (age 64) Niel, Belgium
- Listed height: 6 ft 11 in (2.11 m)

Career information
- High school: Rio Mesa (Oxnard, California, U.S.)
- College: Long Beach State (1982–1984); USC (1985–1987)
- NBA draft: 1987: undrafted
- Position: Center

Career highlights
- PCAA All-Freshman team (1983)

Ivan Verberckt (born 4 October 1962) is a Belgian former basketball player. He played college basketball in the United States for the Long Beach State 49ers and USC Trojans. Verberckt played for the Belgium national team.

== Early life ==
Verberckt was born on 4 October 1962 in Niel, Belgium. His father worked as a foreman in a cable factory in Antwerp. Verberckt played basketball for Schelle Club near Antwerp in his youth. Verberckt completed school in Belgium and received his diploma as an electrician. He was noticed by American coach Al Nordquist while playing at a basketball camp in Belgium and was given the opportunity to attend school in the United States.

Verberckt moved to the United States in 1980 as an exchange student. He did not know English and could only speak his native Flemish when he arrived so he was enrolled at Rio Mesa High School as an 18-year-old junior.

Verberckt was looked over by college recruiters because they thought he would attend Moorpark College to play for Nordquist, his American sponsor. He became more interested in attending a four-year college after developing his English skills. On 14 April 1982, Verberckt signed a letter of intent to play college basketball for the Long Beach State 49ers.

== College career ==
Verberckt was selected to the Pacific Coast Athletic Association (PCAA) All-Freshman team as a reserve for the Long Beach State 49ers in 1983. He set a school record for blocked shots as a freshman with 55 during the 1982–83 season. Verberckt entered the starting line-up for the 1983–84 season and averaged 10.8 points and 5.5 rebounds per game.

On 29 May 1984, Verberckt announced that he would transfer to the USC Trojans for his final two years of collegiate eligibility. He sat out the 1984–85 season. Despite joining USC with the expectation of playing a key role, Verberckt failed to impress head coach Stan Morrison and was sparsely used when he was eligible to play in the 1985–86 season. He appeared in 14 games during the 1986–87 season with an average of 1.4 points and 0.8 rebounds.

== National team career ==
Verberckt played for the Belgium national team at EuroBasket 1993.
