= 1995 Big West Conference men's basketball tournament =

- Classification: Division I
- Season: 1994–95
- Teams: 10
- Site: Thomas & Mack Center; Paradise, NV
- Champions: Long Beach State (3rd title)
- Winning coach: Seth Greenberg (2nd title)
- MVP: Brian Green (Nevada)

1994–95 Big West men's basketball standings
	Conf.				Overall
Team	W		L	PCT	W		L	PCT
Utah State	14	–	4	.778	21	–	8	.724
New Mexico State	13	–	5	.722	25	–	10	.714
Long Beach State †	13	–	5	.722	20	–	10	.667
Nevada	12	–	6	.667	18	–	11	.621
Pacific	9	–	9	.500	14	–	13	.519
UC Santa Barbara	8	–	10	.444	13	–	14	.481
UNLV	7	–	11	.389	12	–	16	.429
UC Irvine	6	–	12	.333	13	–	16	.448
Cal State Fullerton	5	–	13	.278	7	–	20	.259
San Jose State	3	–	15	.167	4	–	23	.148
† 1995 Big West tournament winner Rankings from AP poll

The 1995 Big West Conference men's basketball tournament was held March 9–12 at the Thomas & Mack Center in Paradise, Nevada.

Long Beach State defeated Nevada 76–69 in overtime to capture their third PCAA/Big West title. The 49ers subsequently received an automatic bid to the 1995 NCAA tournament.

== Bracket ==
First round Thursday, March 9
9	Cal State Fullerton	69
8	UC Irvine	76
7	UNLV	77
10	San Jose State	66

Quarterfinals; Friday, March 10
1	Utah State	72
8	UC Irvine	76
5	Pacific	62
4	Nevada	64
3	Long Beach State	67
6	UC Santa Barbara	64
7	UNLV	76
2	New Mexico State	96

Semifinals; Saturday, March 11
8	UC Irvine	69
4	Nevada	88
3	Long Beach State	87
2	New Mexico State	79

Championship; Sunday, March 12
4	Nevada	69
3	Long Beach State	76*

- Denotes overtime period
