= 1993 Big West Conference men's basketball tournament =

- Classification: Division I
- Season: 1992–93
- Teams: 8
- Site: Long Beach Arena; Long Beach, CA
- Champions: Long Beach State (2nd title)
- Winning coach: Seth Greenberg (1st title)
- MVP: Lucious Harris (Long Beach State)

1992–93 Big West men's basketball standings
	Conf.				Overall
Team	W		L	PCT	W		L	PCT
No. 24 New Mexico State	15	–	3	.833	26	–	8	.765
No. 25 UNLV	13	–	5	.722	21	–	8	.724
Pacific	12	–	6	.667	16	–	11	.593
Long Beach State †	11	–	7	.611	22	–	10	.688
UC Santa Barbara	10	–	8	.556	18	–	11	.621
Cal State Fullerton	10	–	8	.556	15	–	12	.556
Utah State	7	–	11	.389	10	–	17	.370
Nevada	4	–	14	.222	9	–	17	.346
San Jose State	4	–	14	.222	7	–	19	.269
UC Irvine	4	–	14	.222	6	–	21	.222
† 1993 Big West tournament winner Rankings from AP Poll

The 1993 Big West Conference men's basketball tournament was held March 12–14 at the Long Beach Arena in Long Beach, California.

Long Beach State upset top-seeded New Mexico State in the final, 70–62, to capture their second PCAA/Big West title (and first since 1977).

The 49ers subsequently received an automatic bid to the 1993 NCAA tournament. Regular-season champions, and tournament runners-up, New Mexico State received an at-large bid.

== Format ==
One minor change was made to the tournament format this season despite the Big West maintaining its eight-team tournament.

All eight participating teams (the two teams with the worst conference regular season records were not included) were placed into the first round, with teams seeded and paired based on regular-season records. After the first round, however, teams were now re-seeded so the highest-remaining team was paired with the lowest-remaining time in one semifinal with the other two teams slotted into the other semifinal.

Nevada, in their first year as Big West members (moving from the Big Sky), failed to qualify for the tournament. The Wolf Pack replaced outgoing Fresno State, who left to join the WAC.

== Bracket ==
First round Friday, March 12
1	#24 New Mexico State	87
8	UC Irvine	76
5	Cal State Fullerton	68
4	Long Beach State	80
(Pairings are reseeded after the first round)
3	Pacific	54
6	UC Santa Barbara	57
7	Utah State	86
2	#19 UNLV	104

Semifinals; Saturday, March 13
1	#24 New Mexico State	82
6	UC Santa Barbara	77
4	Long Beach State	79
2	#19 UNLV	77

Championship; Sunday, March 14
1	#24 New Mexico State	62
4	Long Beach State	70
