= 1992–93 New Mexico State Aggies basketball team =

American college basketball season

1992–93 New Mexico State Aggies men's basketball

Big West Regular season champions Great Alaska Shootout champions

NCAA tournament, Second round (vacated)
- Conference: Big West Conference

Ranking
- AP: No. 24
- Record: 25-7 (26–8 unadjusted) (15–3 Big West)
- Head coach: Neil McCarthy (8th season)
- Home arena: Pan American Center

1992–93 Big West men's basketball standings
	Conf.				Overall
Team	W		L	PCT	W		L	PCT
No. 24 New Mexico State	15	–	3	.833	26	–	8	.765
No. 25 UNLV	13	–	5	.722	21	–	8	.724
Pacific	12	–	6	.667	16	–	11	.593
Long Beach State †	11	–	7	.611	22	–	10	.688
UC Santa Barbara	10	–	8	.556	18	–	11	.621
Cal State Fullerton	10	–	8	.556	15	–	12	.556
Utah State	7	–	11	.389	10	–	17	.370
Nevada	4	–	14	.222	9	–	17	.346
San Jose State	4	–	14	.222	7	–	19	.269
UC Irvine	4	–	14	.222	6	–	21	.222
† 1993 Big West tournament winner Rankings from AP Poll

The 1992–93 New Mexico State Aggies basketball team represented New Mexico State University in the 1992–93 college basketball season. This was Neil McCarthy's 8th season as head coach. The Aggies played their home games at Pan American Center and competed in the Big West Conference. They finished the season 26–8, 15–3 in Big West play to win the conference regular season title. They lost in the championship game of the Big West tournament, but received an at-large bid to the NCAA tournament as No. 7 seed in the East region.

In the opening round, New Mexico State defeated No. 10 seed Nebraska, 93–79. The Aggies were then beaten by No. 2 seed Cincinnati in the second round, 85–78.

== Roster ==
1992–93 New Mexico State Aggies men's basketball team
Players
Coaches

Pos.	#	Name	Height	Weight	Year	Hometown
F	4	Tracey Ware	6 ft 7 in (2.01 m)	225 lb (102 kg)	Sr	Houston, TX
G		Sam Crawford	5 ft 8 in (1.73 m)	—	Sr
F		Cliff Reed	6 ft 5 in (1.96 m)	—	Sr
F		Eric Traylor	6 ft 7 in (2.01 m)	—	Sr

Head coach

- Neil McCarthy (Sacramento State)

Assistant coach(es)

Legend

- (C) Team captain
- (S) Suspended
- (I) Ineligible
- (W) Walk-on
- Injured
- Current redshirt

== Schedule and results ==
Date time, TV	Rank^{#}	Opponent^{#}	Result	Record	Site (attendance) city, state
Regular season
Nov 26, 1992*		vs. Chattanooga; Great Alaska Shootout	W 75–65	1–0	Sullivan Arena (6,658); Anchorage, Alaska
Nov 27, 1992*		vs. Oregon; Great Alaska Shootout	W 86–75	2–0	Sullivan Arena (6,183); Anchorage, Alaska
Nov 28, 1992*		vs. Illinois; Great Alaska Shootout	W 95–94	3–0	Sullivan Arena (6,687); Anchorage, Alaska
Dec 1, 1992*	No. 21	Eastern New Mexico	W 73–64	4–0	Pan American Center (8,216); Las Cruces, New Mexico
Dec 4, 1992*	No. 21	UTEP	L 63–64	4–1	Pan American Center (12,313); Las Cruces, New Mexico
Dec 7, 1992*		at UTEP	W 75–69	5–1	Special Events Center (12,007); El Paso, Texas
Dec 12, 1992*		New Mexico	L 62–69	5–2	Pan American Center (12,923); Las Cruces, New Mexico
Dec 21, 1992*		Sam Houston State	W 104–76	6–2	Pan American Center (7,921); Las Cruces, New Mexico
Dec 23, 1992*		at New Mexico	L 66–71	6–3	The Pit (18,100); Albuquerque, New Mexico
Dec 21, 1992*		East Texas State	W 83–69	7–3	Pan American Center (6,349); Las Cruces, New Mexico
Jan 4, 1993		Cal State Fullerton	W 78–67	8–3 (1–0)	Pan American Center (7,629); Las Cruces, New Mexico
Jan 7, 1993		at UC Santa Barbara	W 71–69	9–3 (2–0)	The Thunderdome (6,000); Santa Barbara, California
Jan 9, 1993		at Long Beach State	L 71–97	9–4 (2–1)	The Gold Mine (1,987); Long Beach, California
Jan 14, 1993		San Jose State	W 87–72	10–4 (3–1)	Pan American Center (8,416); Las Cruces, New Mexico
Jan 16, 1993		Pacific	W 53–48	11–4 (4–1)	Pan American Center (8,654); Las Cruces, New Mexico
Jan 21, 1993*		Midwestern State	W 83–69	12–4	Pan American Center (6,560); Las Cruces, New Mexico
Jan 23, 1993		UC Irvine	W 72–67	13–4 (5–1)	Pan American Center (8,919); Las Cruces, New Mexico
Jan 25, 1993		UC Santa Barbara	W 75–64	14–4 (6–1)	Pan American Center (8,344); Las Cruces, New Mexico
Jan 30, 1993		at Nevada	W 96–89	15–4 (7–1)	Lawlor Events Center (5,825); Reno, Nevada
Feb 1, 1993		at Utah State	W 76–64	16–4 (8–1)	Dee Glen Smith Spectrum (7,128); Logan, Utah
Feb 6, 1993		Long Beach State	W 77–65	17–4 (9–1)	Pan American Center (12,249); Las Cruces, New Mexico
Feb 11, 1993		at Pacific	L 68–71	17–5 (9–2)	Alex G. Spanos Center (3,604); Stockton, California
Feb 13, 1993		at San Jose State	W 60–55	18–5 (10–2)	The Event Center (2,550); San Jose, California
Feb 20, 1993		at No. 15 UNLV	L 81–97	18–6 (10–3)	Thomas & Mack Center (18,125); Las Vegas, Nevada
Feb 25, 1993		Utah State	W 82–60	19–6 (11–3)	Pan American Center (7,612); Las Cruces, New Mexico
Feb 27, 1993		Nevada	W 87–66	20–6 (12–3)	Pan American Center (9,348); Las Cruces, New Mexico
Mar 1, 1993		No. 16 UNLV	W 90–88	21–6 (13–3)	Pan American Center (13,007); Las Cruces, New Mexico
Mar 4, 1993		at Cal State Fullerton	W 78–70	22–6 (14–3)	Titan Gym (2,279); Fullerton, California
Mar 6, 1993		at UC Irvine	W 76–74	23–6 (15–3)	Bren Events Center (2,660); Irvine, California
Big West tournament
Mar 12, 1993*	No. 24	vs. UC Irvine; Quarterfinals	W 87–76	24–6	Long Beach Arena (2,500); Long Beach, California
Mar 13, 1993*	No. 24	vs. UC Santa Barbara; Semifinals	W 82–77	25–6	Long Beach Arena (7,515); Long Beach, California
Mar 14, 1993*	No. 24	at Long Beach State; Championship game	L 62–70	25–7	Long Beach Arena (4,543); Long Beach, California
NCAA tournament
Mar 19, 1993*	(7 E) No. 24	vs. (10 E) Nebraska; First Round	W 93–79	26–7	Carrier Dome (14,287); Syracuse, New York
Mar 21, 1993*	(7 E) No. 24	vs. (2 E) No. 7 Cincinnati; Second Round	L 55–92	26–8	Carrier Dome (15,904); Syracuse, New York
*Non-conference game. ^{#}Rankings from AP Poll. (#) Tournament seedings in parentheses. E=East. All times are in Mountain Time.
