= Justin Bibbins =

American basketball player (born 1996)

No. 1 – JDA Dijon
- Position: Point guard
- League: LNB Élite

Personal information
- Born: January 23, 1996 (age 30) Carson, California, U.S.
- Listed height: 5 ft 8 in (1.73 m)
- Listed weight: 150 lb (68 kg)

Career information
- High school: Bishop Montgomery (Torrance, California)
- College: Long Beach State (2014–2017); Utah (2017–2018)
- NBA draft: 2018: undrafted
- Playing career: 2018–present

Career history
- 2018–2019: SKS Starogard Gdański
- 2019: Mladost Zemun
- 2019–2020: ZTE KK
- 2020: Legia Warszawa
- 2020–2022: Élan Béarnais
- 2022–2024: Nanterre 92
- 2024–2025: Dinamo Sassari
- 2025–present: JDA Dijon

Career highlights
- French Cup winner (2022); First-team All-Pac-12 (2018); 2× Second-team All-Big West (2016, 2017)

Justin Bibbins (born January 23, 1996) is an American professional basketball player for JDA Dijon of the LNB Élite. He played college basketball for Long Beach State and Utah.

== College career ==
Bibbins was recruited by Utah out of high school, but the Utes did not have a scholarship available for him by the time he was to join the squad. Instead, Bibbins enrolled at Long Beach State and was twice named All-Conference. He averaged 13.1 points and 4.6 assists per game as a junior. After graduating from Long Beach State, Bibbins decided to transfer to Utah for his final season of eligibility. He was named team captain despite being new to the program. In his first breakout game he had 23 points and made five 3-pointers in a victory against Ole Miss. He quickly became the team's primary scoring option. As a senior at Utah, Bibbins averaged 14.8 points and 4.7 assists per game, hitting 93 three-pointers, the second-highest single-season mark in Utes history. He was named to the First-team All-Pac-12 and led the team to a 23-win season and an appearance in the NIT championship game.

== Professional career ==
Bibbins worked out for several NBA teams in preparation for the 2018 NBA draft and said he draws inspiration from former Utah player Kyle Kuzma. On August 15, 2018, Bibbins signed with SKS Starogard Gdański of the Polish Basketball League.

On October 13, 2019, he has signed with Mladost Zemun of the KLS. Bibbins averaged 17.7 points and 5.9 assists per game. On November 26, 2019, he signed with ZTE KK of the Nemzeti Bajnokság I/A. Bibbins averaged 18.5 points, 2.1 rebounds and 5.5 assists per game. On June 24, 2020, he signed with Legia Warszawa of the Polish Basketball League. In 14 games, Bibbins averaged 18.5 points, 2.6 rebounds and 7.0 assists per game. On December 1, he signed with Élan Béarnais Pau-Lacq-Orthez of the LNB Pro A. Bibbins averaged 14.2 points and 4.6 assists per game. He re-signed with the team on June 27, 2021.

On June 23, 2022, he signed with Nanterre 92 of the French LNB Pro A.

On May 23, 2024, he signed with Dinamo Sassari of the Lega Basket Serie A (LBA).

On June 17, 2025, he signed with JDA Dijon of the LNB Pro A.
