= 1992–93 Long Beach State 49ers men's basketball team =

American college basketball season

1992–93 Long Beach State 49ers men's basketball

Big West tournament champions

NCAA tournament, Round of 64
- Conference: Big West Conference
- Record: 22–10 (11–7 Big West)
- Head coach: Seth Greenberg (3rd season)
- Assistant coaches: David Spencer; Clyde Vaughan; Matt Hart
- Home arena: Walter Pyramid

1992–93 Big West men's basketball standings
	Conf.				Overall
Team	W		L	PCT	W		L	PCT
No. 24 New Mexico State	15	–	3	.833	26	–	8	.765
No. 25 UNLV	13	–	5	.722	21	–	8	.724
Pacific	12	–	6	.667	16	–	11	.593
Long Beach State †	11	–	7	.611	22	–	10	.688
UC Santa Barbara	10	–	8	.556	18	–	11	.621
Cal State Fullerton	10	–	8	.556	15	–	12	.556
Utah State	7	–	11	.389	10	–	17	.370
Nevada	4	–	14	.222	9	–	17	.346
San Jose State	4	–	14	.222	7	–	19	.269
UC Irvine	4	–	14	.222	6	–	21	.222
† 1993 Big West tournament winner Rankings from AP Poll

The 1992–93 Long Beach State 49ers men's basketball team represented California State University, Long Beach during the 1992–93 NCAA Division I men's basketball season. The 49ers, led by third-year head coach Seth Greenberg, played their home games at Walter Pyramid and are members of the Big West Conference. They finished the season 22–10, 11–7 in Big West play, to finish in fourth place. They were champions of the Big West Basketball tournament to earn the conference's automatic bid into the 1993 NCAA tournament where they lost in the opening round to No. 6 seed Illinois, 75–72.

== Roster ==
1992–93 Long Beach State Beach men's basketball team
Players
Coaches

Pos.	#	Name	Height	Weight	Year	Hometown
G	3	Tim Caviezel	6 ft 7 in (2.01 m)	—	Jr	Mount Vernon, Washington
G	4	Jeff Rogers	6 ft 0 in (1.83 m)	—	Jr	Compton, California
G	22	Juaquin Hawkins	6 ft 7 in (2.01 m)	—	Fr	Lynwood, California
G	23	Rod Hannibal	6 ft 5 in (1.96 m)	—	Jr	Long Beach, California
G	30	Lucious Harris	6 ft 5 in (1.96 m)	—	Sr	Los Angeles, California
F	32	Bryon Russell	6 ft 7 in (2.01 m)	—	Sr	San Bernardino, California
F	34	Mike Atkinson	6 ft 7 in (2.01 m)	—	So	San Jose, California
C	40	Chris Jones	6 ft 10 in (2.08 m)	—	Sr	Chicago, Illinois
G	44	Eric Brown	6 ft 6 in (1.98 m)	—	Fr	City of Industry, California
F	55	Terrance O'Kelley	6 ft 7 in (2.01 m)	—	So	Chattanooga, Tennessee

Head coach

- Seth Greenberg

Assistant coach(es)

Legend

- (C) Team captain
- (S) Suspended
- (I) Ineligible
- (W) Walk-on
- Injured
- Current redshirt

== Schedule and results ==
Date time, TV	Rank^{#}	Opponent^{#}	Result	Record	Site (attendance) city, state
Non-conference regular season
December 4, 1992*		vs. Tulsa; Hawaii Tip-Off	W 72–69	1–0	Honolulu, Hawaii
December 5, 1992*		vs. San Diego; Hawaii Tip-Off	W 80–74	2–0	Honolulu, Hawaii
December 11, 1992*		So. Cal College	W 92–62	3–0	The Gold Mine; Long Beach, California
December 18, 1992*		Point Loma	W 112–71	4–0	The Gold Mine; Long Beach, California
December 23, 1992*		Howard	W 95–62	5–0	The Gold Mine; Long Beach, California
December 29, 1992*		vs. Eastern Washington	W 76–59	6–0	Selland Arena; Fresno, California
December 30, 1992*		at Fresno State	W 82–61	7–0	Selland Arena; Fresno, California
Big West Regular season
January 2, 1993		at San Jose State	W 88–73	8–0 (1–0)	The Event Center; San Jose, California
January 4, 1993		at Pacific	L 56–68	8–1 (1–1)	Alex G. Spanos Center; Stockton, California
January 7, 1993		No. 12 UNLV	W 101–94	9–1 (2–1)	The Gold Mine; Long Beach, California
January 9, 1993		New Mexico State	W 97–71	10–1 (3–1)	The Gold Mine; Long Beach, California
January 14, 1993		at Nevada	W 94–75	11–1 (4–1)	Lawlor Events Center; Reno, Nevada
January 16, 1993		at Utah State	W 75–69	12–1 (5–1)	Dee Glen Smith Spectrum; Logan, Utah
January 18, 1993		at UC Santa Barbara	L 60–61	12–2 (6–1)	The Thunderdome; Santa Barbara, California
January 21, 1993		Cal State Fullerton	W 72–58	13–2 (7–1)	The Gold Mine; Long Beach, California
January 23, 1993*		at VCU	L 61–95	13–3	Richmond Coliseum; Richmond, Virginia
1993 Big West tournament
March 12, 1993*		Cal State Fullerton; Quarterfinals	W 80–68	20–9	Long Beach Arena; Long Beach, California
March 13, 1993*		No. 19 UNLV; Semifinals	W 79–77	21–9	Long Beach Arena; Long Beach, California
March 14, 1993*		No. 24 New Mexico State; Championship game	W 70–62	22–9	Long Beach Arena; Long Beach, California
1993 NCAA tournament
March 18, 1993*	(11 W)	vs. (6 W) Illinois; First Round	L 72–75	22–10	Jon M. Huntsman Center; Salt Lake City, Utah
*Non-conference game. ^{#}Rankings from AP Poll. (#) Tournament seedings in parentheses. All times are in Pacific Time (#) during NCAA Tournament is seed with Region.
