= 1994–95 UC Irvine Anteaters men's basketball team =

American college basketball season

1994–95 UC Irvine Anteaters men's basketball
- Conference: Big West Conference
- Record: 13–16 (6–12 Big West)
- Head coach: Rod Baker (4th season)
- Home arena: Bren Events Center

1994–95 Big West men's basketball standings
| | Conf. | | | | Overall |
| Team | W | | L | PCT | W | | L | PCT |
|---|---|---|---|---|---|---|---|---|
| Utah State | 14 | – | 4 | .778 | 21 | – | 8 | .724 |
| New Mexico State | 13 | – | 5 | .722 | 25 | – | 10 | .714 |
| Long Beach State † | 13 | – | 5 | .722 | 20 | – | 10 | .667 |
| Nevada | 12 | – | 6 | .667 | 18 | – | 11 | .621 |
| Pacific | 9 | – | 9 | .500 | 14 | – | 13 | .519 |
| UC Santa Barbara | 8 | – | 10 | .444 | 13 | – | 14 | .481 |
| UNLV | 7 | – | 11 | .389 | 12 | – | 16 | .429 |
| UC Irvine | 6 | – | 12 | .333 | 13 | – | 16 | .448 |
| Cal State Fullerton | 5 | – | 13 | .278 | 7 | – | 20 | .259 |
| San Jose State | 3 | – | 15 | .167 | 4 | – | 23 | .148 |
† 1995 Big West tournament winner Rankings from AP poll

The 1994–95 UC Irvine Anteaters men's basketball team represented the University of California, Irvine during the 1994–95 NCAA Division I men's basketball season. The Anteaters were led by fourth year head coach Rod Baker and played at the Bren Events Center and were members of the Big West Conference.

== Previous season ==
The 1993–94 UC Irvine Anteaters men's basketball team finished the season with a record of 10–20, 4–14 in Big West play and made a surprise run to the Big West Conference tournament finals.

== Roster ==
1994–95 UC Irvine Anteaters men's basketball team
Players
Coaches

| Pos. | # | Name | Height | Weight | Year | Hometown |
|---|---|---|---|---|---|---|
| C | | Dan Augulis | 6 ft 10 in (2.08 m) | — | So |
| F | | Shaun Battle | 6 ft 6 in (1.98 m) | — | Jr |
| G | | Chris Brown | — | — | Sr |
| F | | Khalid Channell | 6 ft 7 in (2.01 m) | — | Sr |
| G | | Danny Fernandez | 6 ft 4 in (1.93 m) | — | Jr |
| G | | Brian Keefe | 6 ft 4 in (1.93 m) | — | Fr |
| G | 5 | Raimonds Miglinieks | 6 ft 3 in (1.91 m) | 200 lb (91 kg) | Jr | Riga (Latvia) |
| F | | Mark Odsather | 6 ft 7 in (2.01 m) | — | Sr |
| G | | Kevin Scott | 6 ft 3 in (1.91 m) | — | So |
| F | | Kevin Simmons | 6 ft 8 in (2.03 m) | — | Fr |
| F | | LaDay Smith | 6 ft 7 in (2.01 m) | — | Sr |
| G | | Shauhin Talesh | 5 ft 11 in (1.8 m) | — | Jr |
| F | | Michael Tate | 6 ft 4 in (1.93 m) | — | Jr |
| G | | Zuri Williams | 6 ft 2 in (1.88 m) | — | Sr |

Head coach

Rod Baker (College of the Holy Cross)

Assistant coach(es)

Legend

- (C) Team captain
- (S) Suspended
- (I) Ineligible
- (W) Walk-on
- Injured
- Current redshirt

Roster

== Schedule ==
| Date time, TV | Rank^{#} | Opponent^{#} | Result | Record | Site (attendance) city, state |
Regular Season
| November 30, 1994* | | at Oklahoma | L 77–99 | 0–1 | Lloyd Noble Center (6,485); Norman, OK |
| December 2, 1994* | | vs. No. 14 Ohio; Hawkeye Invitational | L 72–81 ^{OT} | 0–2 | Carver–Hawkeye Arena (13,045); Iowa City, IA |
| December 3, 1994* | | vs. Pepperdine; Hawkeye Invitational | W 75–68 | 1–2 | Carver–Hawkeye Arena (14,300); Iowa City, IA |
| December 10, 1994* | | at San Diego | W 73–70 | 2–2 | USD Sports Center (1,767); San Diego, CA |
| December 17, 1994* | | at No. 13 Arizona State | L 58–87 | 2–3 | Wells Fargo Arena (6,249); Tempe, AZ |
| December 20, 1994* | | Oregon State | W 89–73 | 3–3 | Bren Events Center (2,410); Irvine, CA |
| December 23, 1994* | | St. Mary's | W 69–66 | 4–3 | Bren Events Center (1,846); Irvine, CA |
| January 3, 1995 | | Cal State Fullerton | L 68–74 | 4–4 (0–1) | Bren Events Center (2,108); Irvine, CA |
| January 7, 1995 | | at UNLV | L 80–84 | 4–5 (0–2) | Thomas & Mack Center (9,937); Paradise, NV |
| January 9, 1995 | | at No. 24 New Mexico State | L 80–85 | 4–6 (0–3) | Pan American Center (6,823); Las Cruces, NM |
| January 14, 1995 | | Nevada | L 83–95 | 4–7 (0–4) | Bren Events Center (2,604); Irvine, CA |
| January 16, 1995 | | Utah State | L 87–93 | 4–8 (0–5) | Bren Events Center (1,875); Irvine, CA |
| January 19, 1995 | | at Pacific | L 77–86 | 4–9 (0–6) | Alex G. Spanos (2,225); Stockton, CA |
| January 22, 1995 | | at San Jose State | W 85–74 | 5–9 (1–6) | Event Center Arena (1,037); San Jose, CA |
| January 26, 1995 | | Long Beach State | W 78–68 | 6–9 (2–6) | Bren Events Center (3,400); Irvine, CA |
| January 28, 1995 | | UC Santa Barbara | W 62–58 | 7–9 (3–6) | Bren Events Center (2,918); Irvine, CA |
| February 2, 1995 | | UNLV | W 82–69 | 8–9 (4–6) | Bren Events Center (2,494); Irvine, CA |
| February 4, 1995 | | New Mexico State | L 77–102 | 8–10 (4–7) | Bren Events Center (3,058); Irvine, CA |
| February 9, 1995 | | Utah State | L 67–94 | 8–11 (4–8) | Smith Spectrum (6,865); Logan, UT |
| February 11, 1995 | | at Nevada | L 79–95 | 8–12 (4–9) | Lawlor Events Center (5,681); Reno, NV |
| February 16, 1995 | | San Jose State | W 79–49 | 9–12 (5–9) | Bren Events Center (2,398); Irvine, CA |
| February 18, 1995 | | Pacific | L 83–84 | 9–13 (5–10) | Bren Events Center (2,955); Irvine, CA |
| February 23, 1995 | | at UC Santa Barbara | L 73–79 | 9–14 (5–11) | UC Santa Barbara Events Center (2,123); Santa Barbara, CA |
| February 25, 1995 | | at Long Beach State | L 71–84 | 9–15 (5–12) | The Pyramid (5,003); Long Beach, CA |
| March 1, 1995* | | Cal State Northridge | W 89–73 | 10–15 | Bren Events Center (1,741); Irvine, CA |
| March 4, 1995 | | at Cal State Fullerton | W 91–83 | 11–15 (6–12) | Titan Gym (1,126); Fullerton, CA |
Big West Conference tournament
| March 9, 1995 | | vs. Cal State Fullerton | W 76–69 | 12–15 | Thomas & Mack Center (3,711); Paradise, NV |
| March 10, 1995 | | vs. Utah State | W 76–72 | 13–15 | Thomas & Mack Center (3,522); Paradise, NV |
| March 11, 1995 | | vs. Nevada | L 69–88 | 13–16 | Thomas & Mack Center (4,450); Paradise, NV |
*Non-conference game. ^{#}Rankings from AP Poll. (#) Tournament seedings in parentheses. All times are in Pacific Time.

== Awards and honors ==
- Raimonds Miglinieks
  - Big West First Team All-Conference
- Brian Keefe
  - Big West All-Freshman Team
- Kevin Simmons
  - Big West All-Freshman Team
