= Howie Landa =

American basketball player and coach

Personal information
- Born: 1932
- Died: March 18, 2020 (aged 87–88)
- Listed height: 5 ft 9 in (1.75 m)

Career information
- High school: Central (Philadelphia, Pennsylvania)
- College: Lebanon Valley (1951–1955)
- NBA draft: 1955: undrafted
- Position: Forward
- Number: 11, 3, 31
- Coaching career: 1962–2008

Career history

Playing
- 1955–1959: Sunbury Mercuries
- 1959–1960: Hazleton Hawks
- 1960–1961: Wilkes-Barre Barons

Coaching
- 1962–1983: Mercer County CC
- 1972–1973: Allentown Jets
- 1979–198?: New Jersey Gems
- 1988–1989: UNLV (men's assistant)
- 1989–1993: UNLV (women's assistant)
- 1994–1995: UNLV (men's interim HC)
- 1999: Phoenix Mercury (assistant)
- ????–????: New York Knicks (assistant)
- 2007–2008: Rizing Fukuoka

Career highlights
- As player: All-Eastern Pro League (1957); No. 11 retired by Lebanon Valley Flying Dutchmen; As head coach: Eastern Pro League Coach of the Year (1973); 2× NJCAA champion (1973, 1974); 3× NJCAA National Coach of the Year

Howie Landa (1932 – March 18, 2020) was an American basketball player and coach. Landa served as head coach at UNLV men's basketball for 7 games during the 1994–95 season. As head coach of the Rebels he had a 5–2 record. Landa was on coaching staffs for several teams in both college and professional leagues throughout his career.

== Early life ==
Landa was originally from Philadelphia, Pennsylvania and attended high school at Central High School.

== Playing career ==
Landa played college basketball at Lebanon Valley College for the Dutchmen and graduated in 1955. Landa was one of the most legendary players in Dutchmen history, having his No. 11 retired. While with the program, Landa set the program record for points at 1,936, which was later broken by Don Johnson in 1973. As of 2020, Landa still holds program records at Lebanon Valley for free throws made in a game, free throws in a season, career free throws, and the single game assists record. In 1953, Landa helped lead Lebanon Valley to the Sweet 16 at the 1953 NCAA Tournament. Landa also played for Lebanon Valley's baseball team.

Landa played professionally in the Eastern Pro League (now the CBA).

== Coaching career ==
From 1962 to 1983, Landa was head coach at Mercer County College in Trenton, New Jersey, leading his team to two NJCAA Division I men's basketball championship titles in 1973 and 1974. In 1972–73, Landa was head coach of the Allentown Jets in the Eastern Pro League and was named Eastern Pro League Coach of the Year. In 1988–89, Landa was an assistant coach at UNLV men's basketball under head coach Jerry Tarkanian. For four seasons from 1989 to 1993, Landa was an assistant coach for UNLV women's basketball. In the 1994–95 season, Landa returned as an assistant coach for UNLV men's basketball under head coach Tim Grgurich where he also became interim head coach for seven games.

Landa also held coaching positions with the New Jersey Gems of the Women's Professional Basketball League, Phoenix Mercury of the WNBA, New York Knicks of the NBA, and Rizing Fukuoka in Japan.

== Halls of Fame ==
Landa has been inducted into several Hall of Fames. In 2021, he was inducted into the Mercer County Community College Athletic Hall of Fame. He is also a member of the Philadelphia Jewish Sports Hall of Fame, the Lebanon Valley College Hall of Fame, the Pennsylvania Sports Hall of Fame, and the NJCAA Hall of Fame.

== Death ==
In March 2020, Landa passed away in Las Vegas, Nevada at the age of 88.
