= Deishuan Booker =

American basketball player (born 1996)

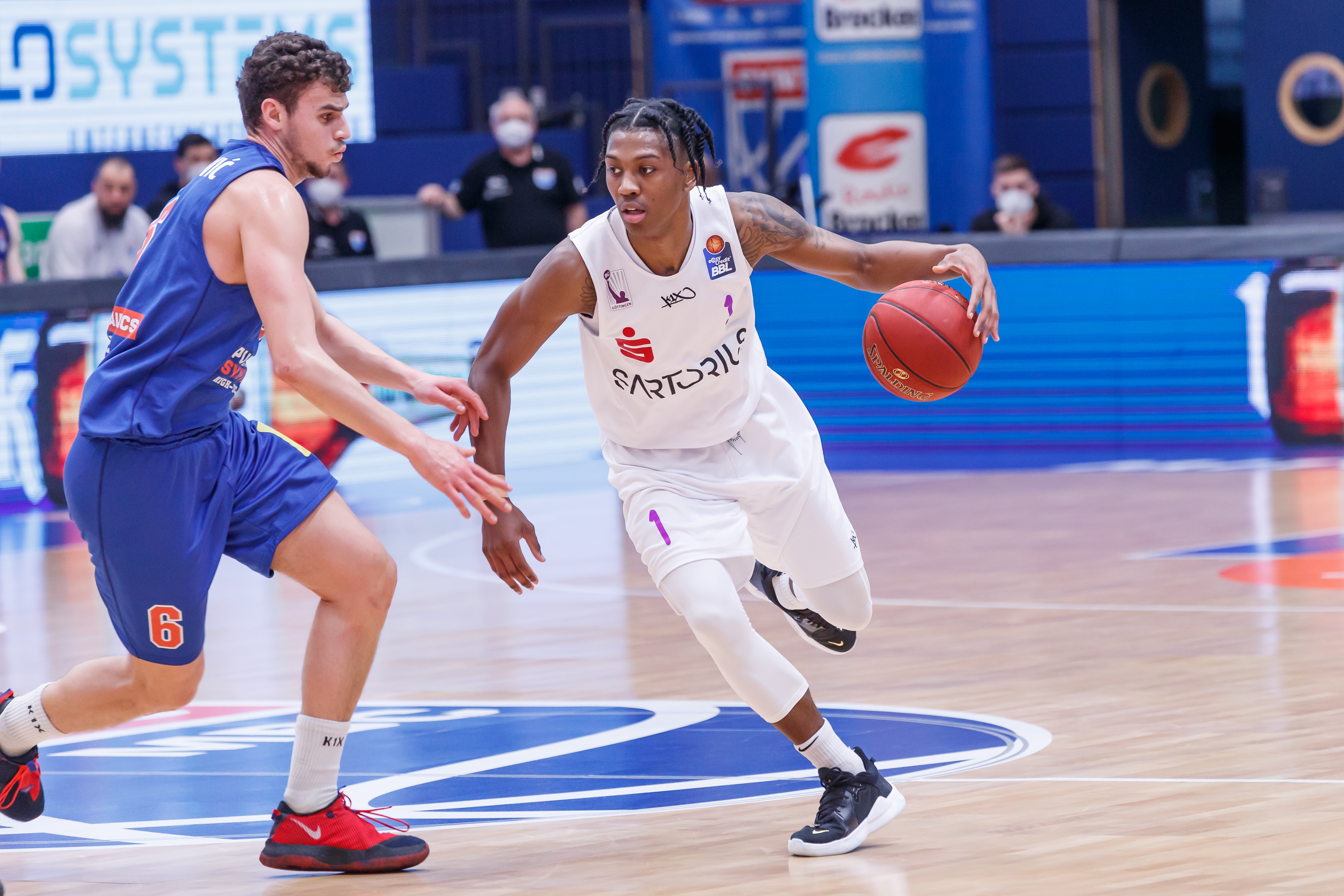
- Booker (with the ball) for Göttingen in 2021

No. 0 – Bnei Herzliya
- Position: Guard
- League: Israeli Basketball Premier League

Personal information
- Born: December 29, 1996 (age 29) Las Vegas, Nevada, U.S.
- Listed height: 6 ft 3 in (1.91 m)
- Listed weight: 170 lb (77 kg)

Career information
- High school: Andre Agassi College Preparatory Academy (Las Vegas, Nevada)
- College: Gillette (2015–2016); Southern Idaho (2016–2017); Long Beach State (2017–2019)
- NBA draft: 2019: undrafted
- Playing career: 2019–present

Career history
- 2019–2020: Basketball Nymburk
- 2020: Anwil Włocławek
- 2020–2021: Göttingen
- 2021–2022: Le Mans
- 2022: Fos Provence
- 2022–2023: Hapoel Galil Elyon
- 2023: Universo Treviso Basket
- 2023–2024: Hapoel Eilat
- 2025: Ostioneros de Guaymas
- 2025–2026: Balıkesir
- 2026: Brussels Basketball
- 2026–present: Bnei Herzliya

Deishuan Booker (born December 29, 1996) is an American professional basketball player for Bnei Herzliya of the Israeli Basketball Premier League. He played college basketball for Gillette College, the College of Southern Idaho, and California State University, Long Beach. In 2018–19 he led the NCAA with 250 free throws, while he was third in the NCAA with a .912 free throw percentage.

== Early life ==
Booker was born in Las Vegas, Nevada. He is 6 feet 3 inches (191 cm) tall, and weighs 170 pounds (77 kg).

He played high school basketball for Andre Agassi College Preparatory Academy ('15) in Las Vegas for two seasons. Booker averaged 27.7 points per game at as a senior, leading the state in scoring. He was named the Southern League Player of the Year both seasons, and a third-team all-state selection.

== College career ==
In 2015–16 Booker played basketball for Gillette College. He averaged 11.0 points, 4.3 assists, and 3.4 rebounds per game.

In 2016–17 he played basketball for the College of Southern Idaho. Booker averaged 9.8 points, 6.4 assists, 4.4 rebounds, and 1.7 steals per game.

In 2017–19 Booker played basketball for California State University, Long Beach ('19). In 2017–18 he averaged 10.6 points per game, 4.6 assists per game (leading the Big West Conference), 1.5 steals per game (4th), and 94 turnovers (leading the Big West), with an .858 free throw percentage (2nd) and a .557 2-point field goal percentage (5th). In 2018–19 he averaged 18.8 points per game (3rd in the Big West), 4.4 assists per game (3rd), 1.3 steals per game (8th), and 130 turnovers (leading the Big West), with a .912 free throw percentage (leading the Big West, and 3rd in the NCAA), and his 250 free throws led the NCAA. In 2018 he was All-Big West Honorable Mention, and in 2019 he was Big West First Team, and Big West All-Tournament Team. His career .897 free throw percentage is tops in the Big West, and 10th in the NCAA.

== Professional career ==
In 2019–20 Booker played for CEZ Nymburk in the Czech National Basketball League.

In 2020–21 he played for BG Göttingen in the EasyCredit BBL. That season Booker also played for Anwil Wloclawek in the Polish Basketball League, for whom he averaged 15.3 points per game and 5.4 assists per game.

In 2021–22 he played for Le Mans Sarthe Basket in the Jeep Elite. That season Booker also played for Fos-sur-mer in the Jeep Elite.

In 2022–23 Booker is playing at guard for Hapoel Galil Elyon in the Israeli Basketball Premier League.

On July 24, 2023, he signed with Treviso Basket of the Lega Basket Serie A.

On November 30, 2023, he signed with Hapoel Eilat of the Israeli Basketball Premier League.
