= Tariq Abdul-Wahad =

French basketball coach and player (born 1974)

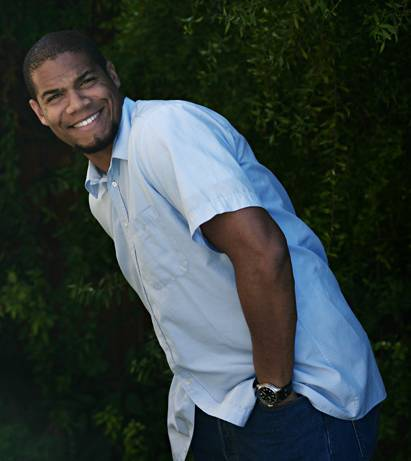
- Abdul-Wahad in 2007

Personal information
- Born: November 3, 1974 (age 52) Maisons-Alfort, Val-de-Marne, France
- Listed height: 6 ft 6 in (1.98 m)
- Listed weight: 223 lb (101 kg)

Career information
- High school: Aristide Briand (Évreux, France)
- College: Michigan (1993–1994); San Jose State (1995–1997)
- NBA draft: 1997: 1st round, 11th overall pick
- Drafted by: Sacramento Kings
- Playing career: 1997–2003
- Position: Shooting guard / small forward
- Number: 9
- Coaching career: 2011–2016

Career history

Playing
- 1997–1999: Sacramento Kings
- 1999–2000: Orlando Magic
- 2000–2002: Denver Nuggets
- 2002–2003: Dallas Mavericks

Career highlights
- First-team All-WAC (1997)

Career NBA statistics
- Points: 1,830 (7.8 ppg)
- Rebounds: 776 (3.3 rpg)
- Assists: 266 (1.1 apg)
- Stats at NBA.com
- Stats at Basketball Reference
Medals
Representing France
Men's basketball
European U-18 Championship
Gold medal – first place	1992 Hungary	U-18 Team

Tariq Abdul-Wahad (born Olivier Michael Saint-Jean; November 3, 1974) is a French basketball coach and former player. As Olivier Saint-Jean, he played college basketball for the Michigan Wolverines and San Jose State Spartans. In 1997, the Sacramento Kings selected Saint-Jean in the first round of the NBA draft as the 11th overall pick, and Saint-Jean converted to Islam and changed his name to Tariq Abdul-Wahad. From 1997 to 2003, Abdul-Wahad played in the NBA for the Kings, Orlando Magic, Denver Nuggets, and Dallas Mavericks. He was the first player to be raised in France and play in the NBA.

== Early life and college years ==
Olivier Saint-Jean was born in Maisons-Alfort near Paris. His mother George Goudet was a professional basketball player. His step-father Quinis Brower was a former Hofstra University and pro basketball player who was drafted by the ABA's New York Nets before a professional career in France, playing with the club team Limoges.

After graduating from Lycee Aristide Briand in 1993, Abdul-Wahad first played college basketball for two years at Michigan and transferred to San Jose State in 1995. Abdul-Wahad was part of the San Jose State team that won the 1996 Big West Conference men's basketball tournament and made the NCAA Tournament despite a 13–16 record.

Then as a senior with SJSU, Abdul-Wahad ranked as the seventh-leading scorer in the country, averaging 23.8 points. His No. 3 jersey was retired by San Jose State in 2002; however, the banner hanging in the Event Center Arena refers to him as Olivier Saint-Jean, the name he used while in college. He changed his name to Tariq Abdul-Wahad after converting to Islam in 1997.

== Professional career ==
Abdul-Wahad's peak year as a pro was with the Sacramento Kings in the lockout-shortened 1999 NBA season, when he was a starter for the team. They pushed the Utah Jazz to the brink of elimination but lost in the fifth and final game of the series.

He was known as a defensive specialist, but his playing time was restricted in later seasons due to injuries. He only played in 236 out of a possible 624 games between 1997 and 2005. In the whole 2003–04 and 2004–05 seasons Abdul-Wahad was on the Dallas Mavericks' roster on injured reserve, as he was permanently unable to play. He was released by Mavericks on 28 September 2005, during training camp prior to the 2005–06 season. In November 2006 Italian team Climamio Bologna invited Abdul-Wahad to a try out, but he was not signed.

== NBA career statistics ==
Legend
GP	Games played	GS	Games started	MPG	Minutes per game
FG%	Field goal percentage	3P%	3-point field goal percentage	FT%	Free throw percentage
RPG	Rebounds per game	APG	Assists per game	SPG	Steals per game
BPG	Blocks per game	PPG	Points per game	**Bold**	Career high

=== Regular season ===
Year	Team	GP	GS	MPG	FG%	3P%	FT%	RPG	APG	SPG	BPG	PPG
1997–98	Sacramento	**59**	16	16.3	.403	.211	.672	2.0	.9	.6	.2	6.4
1998–99	Sacramento	49	**49**	24.6	.435	.286	.691	3.8	1.0	1.0	.3	9.3
1999–00	Orlando	46	46	**26.2**	.433	.095	**.762**	**5.2**	1.6	**1.2**	.3	**12.2**
1999–00	Denver	15	10	24.9	.389	**.500**	.738	3.5	**1.7**	.4	**.8**	8.9
2000–01	Denver	29	12	14.5	.387	.400	.583	2.0	.8	.5	.4	3.8
2001–02	Denver	20	12	20.9	.379	**.500**	.750	3.9	1.1	.9	.5	6.8
2001–02	Dallas	4	0	6.0	.000	–	.000	1.5	.5	.5	.3	.0
2002–03	Dallas	14	0	14.6	**.466**	.000	.500	2.9	1.5	.4	.2	4.1
Career		236	145	20.4	.417	.237	.703	3.3	1.1	.8	.4	7.8

=== Playoffs ===
Year	Team	GP	GS	MPG	FG%	3P%	FT%	RPG	APG	SPG	BPG	PPG
1999	Sacramento	5	**5**	**19.8**	**.455**	.000	.813	**3.8**	.8	**.8**	**.8**	**8.6**
2003	Dallas	**8**	0	9.9	.300	.000	**.875**	2.8	**.9**	.0	.0	3.1
Career		13	5	13.7	.381	.000	.833	3.2	.8	.3	.3	5.2

== National team career ==
Abdul-Wahad (as Oliver Saint Jean) played for the France men's national under-18 basketball team at the 1992 FIBA Europe Under-18 Championship where his team won gold. As a senior player for France, he won the silver medal in the 2000 Olympic game in Sydney losing against the US in the final.

== Post-playing years ==
In 2005, Abdul-Wahad played the part of King Negus of Abyssinia (Ethiopia) in the video play Mercy to Mankind: Part 1, The Prophecy Fulfilled, sponsored by the MAS (Muslim American Society) Youth Chapter, Dallas, Texas.

Abdul-Wahad finished his B.A. in art history at San Jose State University in 2008 and enrolled in the M.A. program at San Jose State afterwards. He later started a clothing business in Brazil with a friend and a television production company in France.

On July 21, 2011, the Division II Cal State Monterey Bay Otters women's basketball team hired Abdul-Wahad as an assistant coach.

Abdul-Wahad became head varsity boys' basketball coach at Lincoln High School of San Jose, California in 2012.
