= 1994–95 Long Beach State 49ers men's basketball team =

American college basketball season

1994–95 Long Beach State 49ers men's basketball

Big West tournament champions

NCAA tournament, Round of 64
- Conference: Big West Conference
- Record: 20–10 (13–5 Big West)
- Head coach: Seth Greenberg (5th season)
- Assistant coaches: David Spencer; Clyde Vaughan; Matt Hart
- Home arena: Walter Pyramid

1994–95 Big West men's basketball standings
	Conf.				Overall
Team	W		L	PCT	W		L	PCT
Utah State	14	–	4	.778	21	–	8	.724
New Mexico State	13	–	5	.722	25	–	10	.714
Long Beach State †	13	–	5	.722	20	–	10	.667
Nevada	12	–	6	.667	18	–	11	.621
Pacific	9	–	9	.500	14	–	13	.519
UC Santa Barbara	8	–	10	.444	13	–	14	.481
UNLV	7	–	11	.389	12	–	16	.429
UC Irvine	6	–	12	.333	13	–	16	.448
Cal State Fullerton	5	–	13	.278	7	–	20	.259
San Jose State	3	–	15	.167	4	–	23	.148
† 1995 Big West tournament winner Rankings from AP poll

The 1994–95 Long Beach State 49ers men's basketball team represented California State University, Long Beach during the 1994–95 NCAA Division I men's basketball season. The 49ers, led by fifth year head coach Seth Greenberg, played their home games at Walter Pyramid and were members of the Big West Conference. They finished the season 20–10, 13–5 in Big West play to finish in second place. They were champions of the Big West Basketball tournament to earn the conference's automatic bid into the 1995 NCAA tournament where they lost in the opening round to No. 4 seed Utah, 76–64.

== Roster ==
1994–95 Long Beach State Beach men's basketball team
Players
Coaches

Pos.	#	Name	Height	Weight	Year	Hometown
G	22	Juaquin Hawkins	6 ft 7 in (2.01 m)	—	So	Lynwood, California
F	34	Mike Atkinson	6 ft 7 in (2.01 m)	—	Sr	San Jose, California
G	44	Eric Brown	6 ft 6 in (1.98 m)	—	Jr	City of Industry, California
F	55	Terrance O'Kelley	6 ft 7 in (2.01 m)	—	Sr	Chattanooga, Tennessee

Head coach

- Seth Greenberg

Assistant coach(es)

Legend

- (C) Team captain
- (S) Suspended
- (I) Ineligible
- (W) Walk-on
- Injured
- Current redshirt

Roster

== Schedule and results ==
Date time, TV	Rank^{#}	Opponent^{#}	Result	Record	Site (attendance) city, state
Non-conference regular season
Nov 30, 1994*		Detroit Mercy	W 71–64	1–0	Walter Pyramid; Long Beach, California
Dec 29, 1994*		vs. Coppin State; Oldsmobile Spartan Classic	W 69–63	4–1	Breslin Center; East Lansing, Michigan
Dec 30, 1994*		at No. 15 Michigan State; Oldsmobile Spartan Classic	L 60–70	4–2	Breslin Center; East Lansing, Michigan
Big West Regular season
Jan 5, 1995		No. 20 New Mexico State	L 78–98	4–3 (0–1)	Walter Pyramid; Long Beach, California
Jan 9, 1995*		Nebraska	L 71–82	4–4	Walter Pyramid; Long Beach, California
1995 Big West tournament
Mar 10, 1995*		vs. UC Santa Barbara; Quarterfinals	W 67–64	18–9	Thomas & Mack Center; Las Vegas, Nevada
Mar 11, 1995*		vs. New Mexico State; Semifinals	W 87–79	19–9	Thomas & Mack Center; Las Vegas, Nevada
Mar 12, 1995*		vs. Nevada; Championship game	W 76–69 ^{OT}	20–9	Thomas & Mack Center; Las Vegas, Nevada
1995 NCAA tournament
Mar 17, 1995*	(13 W)	vs. (4 W) No. 19 Utah; First round	L 64–76	20–10	BSU Pavilion; Boise, Idaho
*Non-conference game. ^{#}Rankings from AP Poll. (#) Tournament seedings in parentheses. All times are in Pacific Time (#) during NCAA Tournament is seed with Region.
