= Admon Gilder =

American basketball player (born 1995)

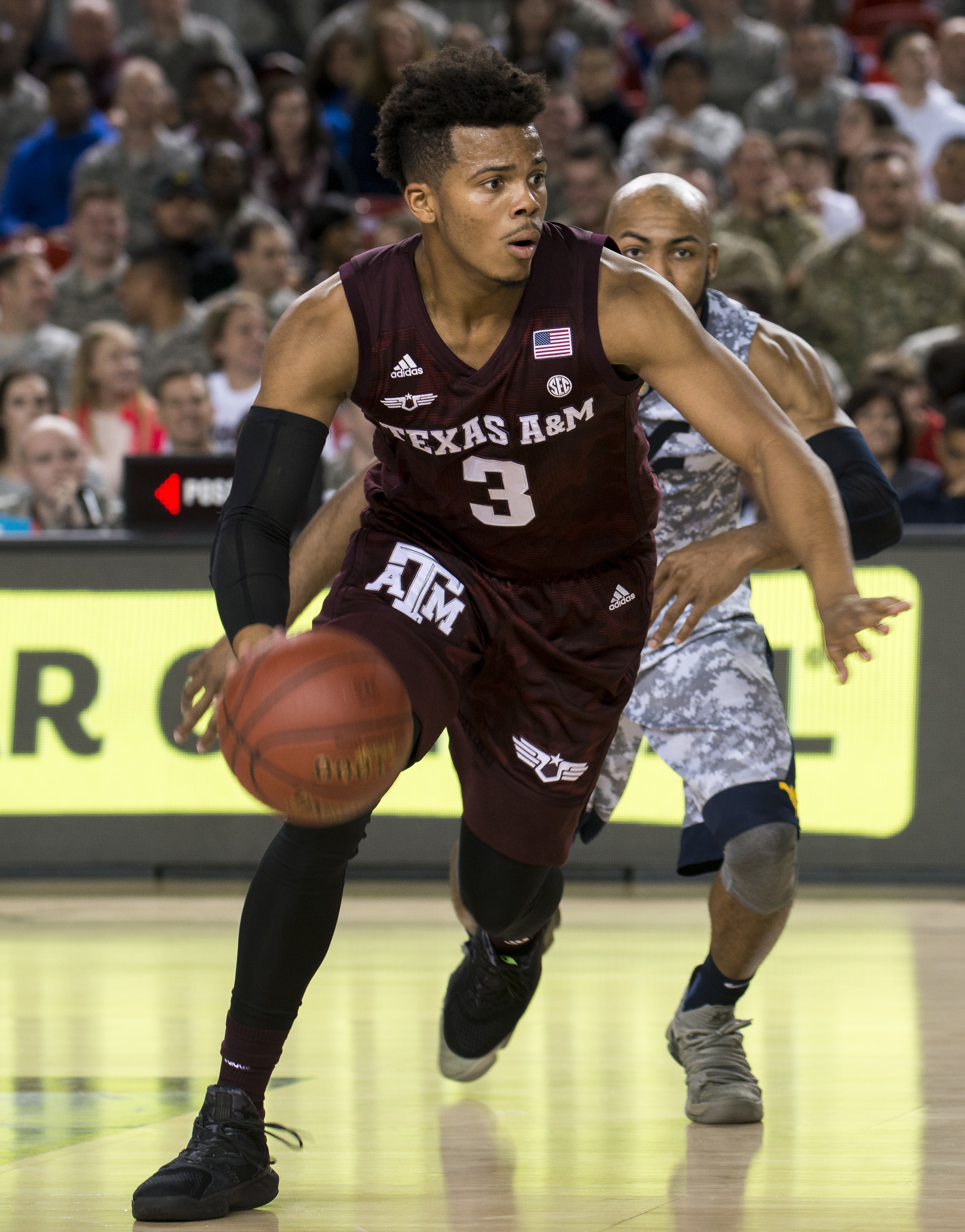
- Gilder with Texas A&M in 2017

Plateros de Fresnillo
- Position: Shooting guard
- League: LNBP

Personal information
- Born: November 14, 1995 (age 30) Dallas, Texas, U.S.
- Listed height: 6 ft 4 in (1.93 m)
- Listed weight: 205 lb (93 kg)

Career information
- High school: James Madison (Dallas, Texas)
- College: Texas A&M (2015–2018); Gonzaga (2019–2020)
- NBA draft: 2020: undrafted
- Playing career: 2021–present

Career history
- 2021: Lahti Basketball
- 2021–2022: Spójnia Stargard
- 2022–2023: Maccabi Haifa
- 2023: Calgary Surge
- 2023–2024: NBA G League Ignite
- 2024: Élan Béarnais Pau-Orthez
- 2024–2025: Kouvot
- 2025–present: Plateros de Fresnillo

Career highlights
- Gatorade Texas Player of the Year (2015)

Admon Amon Gilder Jr. (born November 14, 1995) is an American professional basketball player who plays for Plateros de Fresnillo of the Mexican LNBP. He played college basketball for the Texas A&M Aggies and the Gonzaga Bulldogs.

== Early life ==
Gilder is the son of Admon Gilder Sr. and Paula Gilder, who is a breast cancer survivor. He began playing basketball at eight years old. He attended James Madison High School in Dallas, Texas, where he participated in basketball, cross country, and track and field. As a freshman, he averaged 15 points per game and earned District 11 3A freshman of the year honor. As a sophomore, Gilder averaged 22 points per game and led the team to a state title, being named District MVP. He led Madison to another state title as a junior and was named tournament MVP, averaging 26 points per game. He scored a career-high 43 points as a junior against Dallas Carville High School. As a senior, Gilder averaged 30.8 points, 9.6 rebounds, 4.8 assists, 3.4 steals and 1.4 blocks per game. He led Madison to a 25–8 record and a Class 4A state semifinal finish, earning recognition as the 2015 11-4A District MVP. Gilder was named Gatorade Texas Player of the Year.

Gilder was considered a four-star recruit by 247Sports, ESPN, Rivals, and Scout. He was a member of ESPN's Top 100 in the Class of 2015 and was ranked by ESPN as the sixth-best prospect in Texas as well as the No. 17 shooting guard. In November 2014, Gilder signed with Texas A&M over offers from Baylor, Oklahoma State and SMU.

== College career ==
As a freshman, Gilder averaged seven points and 2.3 rebounds per game, joining Tyler Davis and D. J. Hogg on a team that reached the Sweet 16. He averaged 13.7 points, 3.9 rebounds and 3.9 assists per game as a sophomore. Gilder averaged 12.3 points, 4.1 rebounds and 2.6 assists per game as a junior, helping Texas A&M reach the Sweet 16. He suffered a meniscus tear in December 2017, forcing him to miss five games. Coming into his senior season, Gilder was hampered by knee and hamstring injuries. He missed the 2018–19 season with a blood clot, forcing doctors to remove a rib. By the time he was cleared to play, coach Billy Kennedy had been fired.

Gilder decided to transfer to Gonzaga for his final season of eligibility. He saw five straight double-figure scoring games to open the season, but his production declined and he was replaced in the starting lineup by Joël Ayayi. Despite battling knee issues, Gilder maintained his contributions to the team. He averaged 10.7 points per game for the Bulldogs.

== Professional career ==
On June 24, 2021, Gilder signed with Lahti Basketball of the Finnish Korisliiga.

On November 23, Gilder signed with Spójnia Stargard of the Polish Basketball League (PLK).

On August 28, 2023, Gilder signed with the NBA G League Ignite.

On April 8, 2024, Gilder signed with Élan Béarnais Pau-Orthez for the French LNB Pro B.

On October 28, 2024, Gilder joined the Memphis Hustle but was waived on November 4.

On April 27, 2025 Gilder won A Championship with AlUla Club

== Career statistics ==
Legend
GP	Games played	GS	Games started	MPG	Minutes per game
FG%	Field goal percentage	3P%	3-point field goal percentage	FT%	Free throw percentage
RPG	Rebounds per game	APG	Assists per game	SPG	Steals per game
BPG	Blocks per game	PPG	Points per game	**Bold**	Career high

=== College ===
Year	Team	GP	GS	MPG	FG%	3P%	FT%	RPG	APG	SPG	BPG	PPG
2015–16	Texas A&M	**37**	0	20.4	.431	.347	.761	2.3	1.3	.9	.1	7.0
2016–17	Texas A&M	31	**29**	**34.6**	.429	.377	.743	3.9	**3.9**	**1.9**	**.3**	**13.7**
2017–18	Texas A&M	30	**29**	32.0	**.458**	**.395**	**.821**	**4.1**	2.6	1.2	.2	12.3
2018–19	Texas A&M	Redshirt										
2019–20	Gonzaga	33	10	25.6	.429	.363	.760	2.8	2.0	1.1	**.3**	10.7
Career		131	68	27.7	.437	.371	.770	3.2	2.4	1.3	.2	10.7

== Personal life ==
Gilder is the son of Admon Gilder Sr. and Paula Gilder. He has a brother, Y'kendrick; a sister, Teamber; and a daughter, Kailey. He is the first person in his immediate family to graduate from college.
