= 2019–20 West Coast Conference men's basketball season =

- League: NCAA Division I
- Sport: Men's basketball
- Teams: 10

Regular season
- Season champions: Gonzaga
- Season MVP: Filip Petrusev, Gonzaga

Tournament
- Champions: Gonzaga
- Runners-up: Saint Mary's
- Finals MVP: Joel Ayayi, Gonzaga

Basketball seasons
- ← 2018–19 2020–21 →

2019–20 West Coast Conference men's basketball standings
	Conf.				Overall
Team	W		L	PCT	W		L	PCT
No. 2 Gonzaga †	15	–	1	.938	31	–	2	.939
No. 14 BYU	13	–	3	.813	24	–	8	.750
Saint Mary's	11	–	5	.688	26	–	8	.765
Pacific	11	–	5	.688	23	–	10	.697
San Francisco	9	–	7	.563	22	–	12	.647
Pepperdine	8	–	8	.500	16	–	16	.500
Santa Clara	6	–	10	.375	20	–	13	.606
Loyola Marymount	4	–	12	.250	11	–	21	.344
San Diego	2	–	14	.125	9	–	23	.281
Portland	1	–	15	.063	9	–	23	.281
† 2020 WCC tournament winner Rankings from AP poll

The 2019–20 West Coast Conference men's basketball season began with practices in September 2019 and will end with the 2020 West Coast Conference Men's Basketball Tournament in March 2020. This is the 69th season for WCC men's basketball, and the 31st under its current name of "West Coast Conference". The conference was founded in 1952 as the California Basketball Association, became the West Coast Athletic Conference in 1956, and dropped the word "Athletic" in 1989.

== Head coaches ==
=== Coaching changes ===
On March 26, 2019 Dave Rose announced his retirement after 14 seasons as the head coach at Brigham Young University. His career record at BYU was 348-135 with 8 seasons where his team qualified for the NCAA tournament. Shortly thereafter, Mark Pope, the head coach at Utah Valley University, was announced as the head coach at BYU. Pope had previously been an assistant coach at BYU from 2011-15.

In March 2019, Kyle Smith was selected as the new head coach at Washington State signing a six-year contract after the previous coach Ernie Kent was fired. Todd Golden, an assistant coach at USF, was later named as the new head coach for the Dons. At just 34 years old, Golden became the 7th youngest coach in Division I history. Golden formerly played at Saint Mary's from 2004-07.

=== Coaches ===
Team	Head coach	Previous job	Years at school	Overall record	WCC record	WCC Tournament record	NCAA Tournaments	Sweet Sixteens
BYU	Mark Pope	Utah Valley	1	0–0 (–)	0–0 (–)	0–0 (–)	0	0
Gonzaga	Mark Few	Gonzaga (asst.)	21	569–122 (.819)	276–30 (.902)	43–5 (.896)	20	9
Loyola Marymount	Mike Dunlap	Charlotte Bobcats	6	70–87 (.446)	31–57 (.352)	2–5 (.286)	0	0
Pacific	Damon Stoudamire	Memphis Grizzlies (asst.)	4	39–58 (.402)	17–35 (.327)	1–3 (.250)	0	0
Pepperdine	Lorenzo Romar	Arizona (asst.)	2	16–18 (.471)	6–10 (.375)	3–1 (.750)	7	3
Portland	Terry Porter	Minnesota Timberwolves (asst.)	4	28–69 (.289)	6–46 (.115)	1–3 (.250)	0	0
Saint Mary's	Randy Bennett	Saint Louis(asst.)	19	414–174 (.704)	208–85 (.710)	22–15 (.595)	7	1
San Diego	Sam Scholl	San Diego (asst.)	2	23–16 (.590)	7–9 (0.438)	3–1 (0.750)	0	0
San Francisco	Todd Golden	San Francisco (asst.)	1	0–0 (–)	0–0 (–)	0–0 (–)	0	0
Santa Clara	Herb Sendek	Arizona State	4	44–51 (.463)	26–26 (.500)	1–3 (.250)	8	1

Notes:

- Year at school includes 2019–20 season.
- Overall and WCC records are from time at current school and are through the beginning of the 2019–20 season.

== Preseason ==
=== Preseason poll ===
2019-20 WCC Preseason Men's Basketball Coaches Poll
Rank	Team (First Place Votes)	Points
1.	Gonzaga (7)	79
2.	Saint Mary's (3)	75
3.	BYU	65
4.	Pepperdine	56
5.	Santa Clara	50
6.	San Francisco	40
7.	Loyola Marymount	34
8.	Pacific	21
8.	San Diego	21
10.	Portland	9

=== All-WCC Preseason Men's Basketball team ===
Honor	Recipient
Preseason All-WCC Team	Yoeli Childs, BYU
Preseason All-WCC Team	Tahj Eaddy, Santa Clara
Preseason All-WCC Team	Kessler Edwards, Pepperdine
Preseason All-WCC Team	Malik Fitts, Saint Mary's
Preseason All-WCC Team	Jordan Ford, Saint Mary's
Preseason All-WCC Team	TJ Haws, BYU
Preseason All-WCC Team	Charles Minlend, San Francisco
Preseason All-WCC Team	Colby Ross, Pepperdine
Preseason All-WCC Team	Killian Tillie, Gonzaga
Preseason All-WCC Team	Jahlil Tripp, Pacific

== Rankings ==
Legend
	Improvement in ranking
	Drop in ranking
	Not ranked previous week
RV	Received votes but were not ranked in Top 25 of poll
(Italics)	Number of first place votes

		Pre/ Wk 1	Wk 2	Wk 3	Wk 4	Wk 5	Wk 6	Wk 7	Wk 8	Wk 9	Wk 10	Wk 11	Wk 12	Wk 13	Wk 14	Wk 15	Wk 16	Wk 17	Wk 18	Wk 19	Post
BYU	AP							RV	RV	RV	RV	RV	RV		RV	RV	23	17	15	14	18
BYU	C														RV	RV	RV	18	15-T	16	16
Gonzaga	AP	8	8	8	8	9	6	2 (15)	1 (54)	1 (63)	1 (54)	1 (30)	2 (31)	2 (19)	2 (15)	2 (15)	2 (14)	3	2	2	2
Gonzaga	C	7	7	8	7	9	6	2 (4)	1 (23)	1 (30)	1 (27)	1 (16)	1 (19)	2 (17)	2 (12)	2 (13)	2 (11)	4	2	2	2
Loyola Marymount	AP																				
Loyola Marymount	C																				
Pacific	AP																				
Pacific	C																				
Pepperdine	AP																				
Pepperdine	C																				
Portland	AP																				
Portland	C																				
Saint Mary's	AP	20	18	RV	RV	RV	RV	RV	RV	RV	RV	RV		RV			RV		RV	RV	RV
Saint Mary's	C	20	20	RV	RV	RV	RV	RV	RV	RV		RV	RV	RV	RV	RV	RV	RV	RV	RV	RV
San Diego	AP																				
San Diego	C																				
San Francisco	AP																				
San Francisco	C																				
Santa Clara	AP																				
Santa Clara	C																				

== Regular season ==
=== Early season tournaments ===
All ten of the schools from the West Coast Conference participated in multiple-team events or early season tournaments. The following table summarizes the results of each tournament.

Team	Tournament	Finish	Record	Bracketed	Arena	Arena Location	Hosted By	TV Partner
BYU	Maui Invitational	3rd of 8	2-1	Yes	Lahaina Civic Center	Maui, Hawaii	Chaminade University of Honolulu	ESPN
Gonzaga	Battle 4 Atlantis	2nd of 8	2-1	Yes	Imperial Arena	Nassau, Bahamas	N/A	ESPN
Loyola Marymount	Junkanoo Jam	3rd of 4	1-2	No	GCA Gymnasium	Bimini, Bahamas	Gateway Christian Academy	FloHoops
Pacific	Outrigger Resorts Rainbow Classic	3rd of 4	1-2	No	Stan Sherriff Center	Honolulu, Hawaii	University of Hawaii at Manoa	Spectrum Sports
Pepperdine	Wooden Legacy	8th of 8	0-3	Yes	Titan Gym	Fullerton, California	Cal State Fullerton	ESPN
Portland	Diamond Head Classic	8th of 8	0-3	Yes	Stan Sherriff Center	Honolulu, Hawaii	University of Hawaii at Manoa	ESPN
Saint Mary's	Sacramento Classic	N/A	2-1	No	Campus sites	Campus Sites	Campus Sites	ESPN & Others
San Diego	Boca Raton Beach Classic	4th of 4	0-2	Yes	RoofClaim.com Arena	Boca Raton, Florida	Florida Atlantic University	CUSA.tv
San Francisco	Oahu Classic	N/A	3-1	No	Campus sites	Campus Sites	Campus Sites	ESPN & Others
Santa Clara	Cable Car Classic	1st of 4	3-0	No	Leavey Center	Santa Clara, California	Santa Clara University	WCC Network

=== Conference matrix ===
This table summarizes the head-to-head results between teams in conference play.

	BYU	Gonzaga	LMU	Pacific	Pepperdine	Portland	Saint Mary's	San Diego	San Francisco	Santa Clara
vs. Brigham Young	–	1–1	0–2	0–1	0–2	0–2	1–1	0–2	1–1	0–1
vs. Gonzaga	1–1	–	0–2	0–1	0–2	0–1	0–2	0–2	0–2	0–2
vs. Loyola Marymount	2–0	2–0	–	2–0	2–0	0–2	2–0	0–1	2–0	0–1
vs. Pacific	1–0	1–0	0–2	–	0–2	0–2	1–1	0–2	1–1	1–1
vs. Pepperdine	2–0	2–0	0–2	2–0	–	0–2	1–0	0–2	1–0	0–2
vs. Portland	2–0	1–0	2–0	2–0	2–0	–	1–0	2–0	1–1	2–0
vs. Saint Mary's	1–1	2–0	0–2	1–1	0–1	0–1	–	0–2	0–2	1–1
vs. San Diego	2–0	2–0	1–0	2–0	2–0	0–2	2–0	–	1–0	2–0
vs. San Francisco	1–1	2–0	0–2	1–1	0–1	1–1	2–0	0–1	–	0–2
vs. Santa Clara	1–0	2–0	1–0	1–1	2–0	0–2	1–1	0–2	2–0	–
Total	13–3	15–1	4–12	11–5	8–8	1–15	11–5	2–14	9–7	6–10

=== Player of the Week ===
Throughout the year, the West Coast Conference named a player of the week as follows:

Week	Date	Player	School
1	November 11, 2019	Jordan Ford	Saint Mary's
2	November 18, 2019	Filip Petrusev	Gonzaga
3	November 25, 2019	Isaiah White	Portland
4	December 2, 2019	TJ Haws	BYU
5	December 9, 2019	Eli Scott	LMU
6	December 16, 2019	Jordan Ford	Saint Mary's
7	December 23, 2019	Colby Ross	Pepperdine
8	December 31, 2019	Ryan Woolridge	Gonzaga
9	January 6, 2020	Jahlil Tripp	Pacific
10	January 13, 2020	Charles Minlend	San Francisco
11	January 20, 2020	Corey Kispert	Gonzaga
12	January 27, 2020	Kameron Edwards	Pepperdine
13	February 3, 2020	Filip Petrusev	Gonzaga
14	February 10. 2020	Jahlil Tripp	Pacific
15	February 17, 2020	Filip Petrusev	Gonzaga
16	February 24, 2020	Yoeli Childs	BYU
17	March 2, 2020	Yoeli Childs	BYU

== All-WCC awards and teams ==
On March 3, 2020, the West Coast Conference announced the following awards:

Honor	Recipient	School
Player of the Year	Filip Petrusev	Gonzaga
Coach of the Year	Damon Stoudamire	Pacific
Defensive Player of the Year	Jahlil Tripp	Pacific
Newcomer of the Year	Jake Toolson	BYU
All-WCC First Team	Yoeli Childs	BYU
All-WCC First Team	Malik Fitts	Saint Mary's
All-WCC First Team	Jordan Ford	Saint Mary's
All-WCC First Team	T. J. Haws	BYU
All-WCC First Team	Corey Kispert	Gonzaga
All-WCC First Team	Filip Petrusev	Gonzaga
All-WCC First Team	Colbey Ross	Pepperdine
All-WCC First Team	Killian Tillie	Gonzaga
All-WCC First Team	Jake Toolson	BYU
All-WCC First Team	Jahlil Tripp	Pacific
All-WCC Second Team	Kameron Edwards	Pepperdine
All-WCC Second Team	Kessler Edwards	Pepperdine
All-WCC Second Team	Charles Minlend	San Francisco
All-WCC Second Team	Eli Scott	LMU
All-WCC Second Team	Josip Vrankic	Santa Clara
All-WCC Freshman Team	Sedrick Altman	Pepperdine
All-WCC Freshman Team	Jaden Bediako	Santa Clara
All-WCC Freshman Team	Daniss Jenkins	Pacific
All-WCC Freshman Team	Keli Leaupepe	LMU
All-WCC Freshman Team	Drew Timme	Gonzaga
WCC Honorable Mention	Joel Ayayi	Gonzaga
WCC Honorable Mention	Ryan Woolridge	Gonzaga
WCC Honorable Mention	Braun Hartfield	San Diego
WCC Honorable Mention	Jamaree Bouyea	San Francisco
WCC Honorable Mention	Jimbo Lull	San Francisco
WCC Honorable Mention	Trey Wertz	Santa Clara
