= 2019–20 Loyola Marymount Lions men's basketball team =

Loyola Marymount University NCAA team

2019–20 Loyola Marymount Lions men's basketball
- Conference: West Coast Conference
- Record: 11–21 (4–12 WCC)
- Head coach: Mike Dunlap (6th season)
- Assistant coaches: Derrick Clark; Jeff Strohm; Brannon Hays
- Home arena: Gersten Pavilion

2019–20 West Coast Conference men's basketball standings
	Conf.				Overall
Team	W		L	PCT	W		L	PCT
No. 2 Gonzaga †	15	–	1	.938	31	–	2	.939
No. 14 BYU	13	–	3	.813	24	–	8	.750
Saint Mary's	11	–	5	.688	26	–	8	.765
Pacific	11	–	5	.688	23	–	10	.697
San Francisco	9	–	7	.563	22	–	12	.647
Pepperdine	8	–	8	.500	16	–	16	.500
Santa Clara	6	–	10	.375	20	–	13	.606
Loyola Marymount	4	–	12	.250	11	–	21	.344
San Diego	2	–	14	.125	9	–	23	.281
Portland	1	–	15	.063	9	–	23	.281
† 2020 WCC tournament winner Rankings from AP poll

The 2019–20 Loyola Marymount Lions men's basketball team represented Loyola Marymount University during the 2019–20 NCAA Division I men's basketball season. The Lions were led by sixth-year head coach Mike Dunlap. They played their home games at Gersten Pavilion in Los Angeles, California as members of the West Coast Conference. They finished the season 11–21 overall and 4–12 in WCC play to finish in eighth place. They defeated San Diego in the first round of the WCC tournament before losing in the second round to San Francisco.

On March 8, 2020, head coach Mike Dunlap was fired. He finished at LMU with a six-year record of 81–108. On March 20, the school announced that Marquette associate head coach Stan Johnson had been named the new head coach of the Lions.

== Previous season ==
The Lions finished the 2018–19 season finished the season 22–12, 8–8 in WCC play to finish in a tie for fifth place. They lost to Pepperdine in the second round of the WCC tournament. They were invited to the CBI where they defeated California Baptist and Brown before losing to South Florida in the quarterfinals.

== Offseason ==
=== Departures ===
Name	Number	Pos.	Height	Weight	Year	Hometown	Reason for departure
Zafir Williams	1	F	6'6"	241	Sophomore	Long Beach, CA	Transferred to Cal State East Bay
Donald Gipson	2	G	6'3"	213	RS Sophomore	Los Angeles, CA	Transferred to Regis
Cameron Allen	3	G	6'2"	176	Junior	Greenville, SC	Transferred to Cal State Bakersfield
James Batemon	5	G	6'1"	189	Senior	Milwaukee, WI	Graduated
Petr Herman	11	F	6'10"	231	Senior	Central Bohemian Region, CR	Graduated
Jeffery McClendon	25	G	6'2"	216	Senior	Lancaster, CA	Graduated

=== Incoming transfers ===
Name	Number	Pos.	Height	Weight	Year	Hometown	Previous school
Parker Dortch	11	G	6'7"	206	Junior	Columbus, NJ	Junior college transferred from Kaskaskia College

=== 2019 recruiting class ===
College recruiting information
Name	Hometown	School	Height	Weight	Commit date
Jonathan Dos Anjos; PF	Sarasota, FL	Victory Rock Prep	6 ft 8 in (2.03 m)	195 lb (88 kg)	
Jonathan Dos Anjos; PF	Recruit ratings: Scout: Rivals: (NR)				
Lazar Zivanovic; SG	Serbia	Crvena Zvezda	6 ft 6 in (1.98 m)	N/A	
Lazar Zivanovic; SG	Recruit ratings: Scout: Rivals: (NR)				
Keli Leaupepe; SF	Melbourne, Australia	Box Hill Senior	6 ft 6 in (1.98 m)	N/A	
Keli Leaupepe; SF	Recruit ratings: Scout: Rivals: (NR)				
Lazar Živanović; SG	Šabac, Serbia	Košarkaški klub Crvena zvezda	6 ft 7 in (2.01 m)	196 lb (89 kg)	
Lazar Živanović; SG	Recruit ratings: Scout: Rivals: (NR)				
Deovaunta Williams; PG	Raleigh, NC	Raleigh-Egypt High School	6 ft 1 in (1.85 m)	160 lb (73 kg)	
Deovaunta Williams; PG	Recruit ratings: Scout: Rivals: (NR)				
Seikou Sisoho Jawara; PG	Mataró, Spain	Get Better Academy	6 ft 3 in (1.91 m)	194 lb (88 kg)	
Seikou Sisoho Jawara; PG	Recruit ratings: Scout: Rivals: (NR)				
Overall recruit ranking: Scout: nr Rivals: nr ESPN: nr
Note: In many cases, Scout, Rivals, 247Sports, On3, and ESPN may conflict in their listings of height and weight.; In these cases, the average was taken. ESPN grades are on a 100-point scale.; Sources: "Loyola Marymount Lions 2019 Basketball Commitments". Rivals.; "2019 Loyola Marymount Lions Basketball Commits". Scout.; "ESPN 2019 Loyola Marymount Lions Basketball recruits". ESPN.; "Scout.com Team Recruiting Rankings". Scout.; "2019 Team Ranking". Rivals.

== Roster ==
2019–20 Loyola Marymount Lions men's basketball team
Players
Coaches

Pos.	#	Name	Height	Weight	Year	Previous school	Hometown
G/F	0	Eli Scott	6 ft 6 in (1.98 m)	245 lb (111 kg)	Jr	Chino Hills HS	Chino Hills, CA
G/F	1	Dameane Douglas	6 ft 7 in (2.01 m)	213 lb (97 kg)	So	San Joaquin Memorial	Hanford, CA
G	2	Joe Quintana	6 ft 2 in (1.88 m)	170 lb (77 kg)	Jr	Bonita HS	West Covina, CA
F	3	Lazar Nekić	7 ft 0 in (2.13 m)	232 lb (105 kg)	Fr	Tri-City Christian School	Belgrade, Serbia
F	10	Jonathan Dos Anjos	6 ft 7 in (2.01 m)	202 lb (92 kg)	Fr	Victory Rock Prep	Curitiba, Brazil
F	11	Parker Dortch	6 ft 7 in (2.01 m)	210 lb (95 kg)	Jr	Northern Burlington HS; Kaskaskia College	Columbus, NJ
G	12	Deovaunta Williams	6 ft 1 in (1.85 m)	160 lb (73 kg)	Fr	Raleigh-Egypt HS	Memphis, TN
C	14	Mattias Markusson (redshirt)	7 ft 3 in (2.21 m)	261 lb (118 kg)	Sr	Kfum Jämtland BBK	Vasterled, Stockholm, Sweden
G	15	Reilly Seebold (W)	6 ft 1 in (1.85 m)	161 lb (73 kg)	Fr	Highland Park HS	Dallas, TX
G	20	Erik Johansson	6 ft 6 in (1.98 m)	185 lb (84 kg)	Sr	Täljegymnasiet	Södertälje, Sweden
G	21	Seikou Sisoho Jawara	6 ft 3 in (1.91 m)	194 lb (88 kg)	Fr	Get Better Academy	Mataró, Spain
G	22	Lazar Živanović	6 ft 7 in (2.01 m)	195 lb (88 kg)	Fr	Crvena Zvezda Basketball	Šabac, Serbia
F	23	Jordan Bell	6 ft 8 in (2.03 m)	221 lb (100 kg)	RS Jr	Inglewood; Compton College	Inglewood, CA
F	34	Keli Leaupepe	6 ft 6 in (1.98 m)	250 lb (113 kg)	Fr	Box Hill Senior	Melbourne, Australia
F	35	Ivan Alipiev	6 ft 8 in (2.03 m)	209 lb (95 kg)	So	Lycée Alphonse de Lamartine	Sofia, Bulgaria

Head coach

- Mike Dunlap (Loyola Marymount)

Assistant coach(es)

- Derrick Clark (Cal Lutheran)
- Jeff Strohm (Eastern Illinois)
- Brannon Hays (Cal Lutheran)

Legend

- (C) Team captain
- (S) Suspended
- (I) Ineligible
- (W) Walk-on
- Injured
- Current redshirt

Roster

== Schedule and results ==
Date time, TV	Rank^{#}	Opponent^{#}	Result	Record	Site (attendance) city, state
Non-conference regular season
November 5, 2019*; 7:00 pm		Westcliff University	W 105–62	1–0	Gersten Pavilion (905); Los Angeles, CA
November 9, 2019*; 7:00 pm, ATTSNRM		at Nevada	L 67–72	1–1	Lawlor Events Center (8,136); Reno, NV
November 16, 2019*; 7:00 pm		Colorado State	L 64–74	1–2	Gersten Pavilion (989); Los Angeles, CA
November 21, 2019*; 1:00 pm		vs. Air Force; Bimini Jam	W 78–64	2–2	Gateway Christian Academy (200); Bimini, Bahamas
November 22, 2019*; 1:00 pm		vs. Indiana State; Bimini Jam	L 60–72	2–3	Gateway Christian Academy (150); Bimini, Bahamas
November 24, 2019*; 3:30 pm		vs. Duquesne; Bimini Jam	L 50–71	2–4	Gateway Christian Academy (200); Bimini, Bahamas
December 1, 2019*; 1:00 pm		Southern Utah	W 61–51	3–4	Gersten Pavilion (622); Los Angeles, CA
December 4, 2019*; 7:00 pm, P12N		at No. 20 Colorado	L 64–76	3–5	CU Events Center (6,169); Boulder, CO
December 7, 2019*; 7:00 pm		Grambling State	W 83–67	4–5	Gersten Pavilion (889); Los Angeles, CA
December 13, 2019*; 7:00 pm		Prairie View A&M	W 79–76	5–5	Gersten Pavilion (673); Los Angeles, CA
December 16, 2019*; 7:00 pm		at UC Davis	L 65–67	5–6	The Pavilion (634); Davis, CA
December 19, 2019*; 7:00 pm		Portland State	L 66–76	5–7	Gersten Pavilion (617); Los Angeles, CA
December 22, 2019*; 1:00 pm		Cal State Fullerton	W 53–46	6–7	Gersten Pavilion; Los Angeles, CA
December 28, 2019*; 7:00 pm		Morgan State	L 71–74	6–8	Gersten Pavilion (670); Los Angeles, CA
WCC regular season
January 2, 2020; 7:00 pm		San Diego	W 64–58	7–8 (1–0)	Gersten Pavilion (770); Los Angeles, CA
January 4, 2020; 6:00 pm, BYUtv		at BYU	L 38–63	7–9 (1–1)	Marriott Center (12,422); Provo, UT
January 11, 2020; 1:00 pm, SPECSN		No. 1 Gonzaga	L 62–87	7–10 (1–2)	Gersten Pavilion (3,900); Los Angeles, CA
January 16, 2020; 6:00 pm, SPECSN		at Pepperdine	L 67–75	7–11 (1–3)	Firestone Fieldhouse (1,474); Malibu, CA
January 18, 2020; 1:00 pm, SPECSN		at San Francisco	L 53–61	7–12 (1–4)	War Memorial Gymnasium (2,370); San Francisco, CA
January 23, 2020; 7:00 pm		Portland	W 77–65	8–12 (2–4)	Gersten Pavilion (818); Los Angeles, CA
January 25, 2020; 6:00 pm, Stadium		Saint Mary's	L 62–73	8–13 (2–5)	Gersten Pavilion (1,437); Los Angeles, CA
January 30, 2020; 7:00 pm		at Pacific	L 50–62	8–14 (2–6)	Alex G. Spanos Center (2,291); Stockton, CA
February 1, 2020; 3:00 pm, SPECSN		Pepperdine	L 67–68 ^{OT}	8–15 (2–7)	Gersten Pavilion (1,427); Los Angeles, CA
February 6, 2020; 8:00 pm, CBSSN		at No. 2 Gonzaga	L 67–85	8–16 (2–8)	McCarthey Athletic Center (6,000); Spokane, WA
February 13, 2020; 8:00 pm, ESPNU		BYU	L 54–77	8–17 (2–9)	Gersten Pavilion (1,533); Los Angeles, CA
February 15, 2020; 2:00 pm		at Santa Clara	W 65–59	9–17 (3–9)	Leavey Center (1,862); Santa Clara, CA
February 20, 2020; 8:00 pm, CBSSN		at Saint Mary's	L 51–57	9–18 (3–10)	University Credit Union Pavilion (3,500); Moraga, CA
February 22, 2020; 7:00 pm		at Portland	W 66–58	10–18 (4–10)	Chiles Center (2,379); Portland, OR
February 27, 2020; 7:00 pm		Pacific	L 53–60	10–19 (4–11)	Gersten Pavilion (946); Los Angeles, CA
February 29, 2020; 5:00 pm, Stadium		San Francisco	L 67–69	10–20 (4–12)	Gersten Pavilion (2,916); Los Angeles, CA
WCC tournament
March 5, 2020; 6:00 pm, BYUtv	(8)	vs. (9) San Diego; First round	W 75–61	11–20	Orleans Arena (1,983); Paradise, NV
March 6, 2020; 6:00 pm, BYUtv	(8)	vs. (5) San Francisco; Second round	L 53–82	11–21	Orleans Arena (3,850); Paradise, NV
*Non-conference game. ^{#}Rankings from AP Poll. (#) Tournament seedings in parentheses.
