= 2019–20 Portland Pilots men's basketball team =

American college basketball season

2019–20 Portland Pilots men's basketball
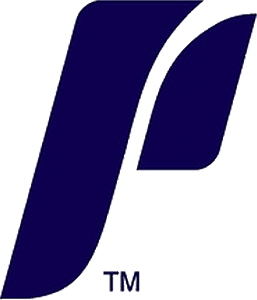
- Conference: West Coast Conference
- Record: 9–23 (1–15 WCC)
- Head coach: Terry Porter (4th season)
- Assistant coaches: Tyler Geving; Ben Johnson; Chris Buchanan
- Home arena: Chiles Center

2019–20 West Coast Conference men's basketball standings
	Conf.				Overall
Team	W		L	PCT	W		L	PCT
No. 2 Gonzaga †	15	–	1	.938	31	–	2	.939
No. 14 BYU	13	–	3	.813	24	–	8	.750
Saint Mary's	11	–	5	.688	26	–	8	.765
Pacific	11	–	5	.688	23	–	10	.697
San Francisco	9	–	7	.563	22	–	12	.647
Pepperdine	8	–	8	.500	16	–	16	.500
Santa Clara	6	–	10	.375	20	–	13	.606
Loyola Marymount	4	–	12	.250	11	–	21	.344
San Diego	2	–	14	.125	9	–	23	.281
Portland	1	–	15	.063	9	–	23	.281
† 2020 WCC tournament winner Rankings from AP poll

The 2019–20 Portland Pilots men's basketball team represented the University of Portland during the 2019–20 NCAA Division I men's basketball season. The Pilots, led by fourth-year head coach Terry Porter, played their home games at the Chiles Center as members of the West Coast Conference. They finished the season 9–23, 1–15 in WCC play to finish in last place. They lost in the first round of the WCC tournament to Santa Clara.

== Previous season ==
The Pilots finished the 2018–19 season 7–25, 0-16 in WCC play to finish in last place. They lost in the first round of the WCC tournament to San Diego.

== Offseason ==
=== Departures ===
Name	Number	Pos.	Height	Weight	Year	Hometown	Reason for departure
Crisshawn Clark	0	G	6'4"	205	RS Junior	Dayton, OH	Graduate transferred
Ty Glover	3	F	6'7"	185	Junior	San Bernardino, CA	Transferred to UT Tyler
Marcus Shaver Jr.	10	G	6'2"	185	Sophomore	Phoenix, AZ	Transferred to Boise State
Josh McSwiggan	11	G/F	6'7"	220	RS Junior	Loughborough, England	Turn pro
Franklin Porter	13	G	6'4"	215	RS Junior	Portland, OR	Graduate transferred
Brian Smith	22	G	6'0"	180	Sophomore	Boise, ID	Transferred to Lewis–Clark State
Xavier Hallinan	55	G	6'1"	170	RS Junior	Portland, OR	Transferred to Purdue Northwest

=== Incoming transfers ===
Name	Number	Pos.	Height	Weight	Year	Hometown	Previous School
Lavar Harewood	0	G/F	6'3"		RS Senior	Brooklyn, NY	Transferred from South Carolina. Will be eligible to play immediately since Harewood graduated from South Carolina State.
Isaiah White	3	G	6'5"	195	RS Senior	Ellicott City, MD	Transferred from Maine. Will be eligible to play immediately since White graduated from Maine.
Quincy Ferebee	4	G	6'2"		Junior	San Diego, CA	Junior college transferred from Southwestern College

=== Recruiting class of 2019 ===
College recruiting information
Name	Hometown	School	Height	Weight	Commit date
Chase Adams; PG	Chicago, IL	Link Year Prep	5 ft 8 in (1.73 m)	140 lb (64 kg)	
Chase Adams; PG	Recruit ratings: Scout: Rivals: (78)				
Cody Collinsworth; C	Dallas, TX	Pilot Point High School	7 ft 1 in (2.16 m)	210 lb (95 kg)	
Cody Collinsworth; C	Recruit ratings: Scout: Rivals: (NR)				
Overall recruit ranking: Scout: nr Rivals: nr ESPN: nr
Note: In many cases, Scout, Rivals, 247Sports, On3, and ESPN may conflict in their listings of height and weight.; In these cases, the average was taken. ESPN grades are on a 100-point scale.; Sources: "Portland Pilots 2019 Basketball Commitments". Rivals.; "2019 Portland Pilots Basketball Commits". Scout.; "ESPN 2019 Portland Pilots Basketball recruits". ESPN.; "Scout.com Team Recruiting Rankings". Scout.; "2019 Team Ranking". Rivals.

== Roster ==
2019–20 Portland Pilots men's basketball team
Players
Coaches

Pos.	#	Name	Height	Weight	Year	Previous school	Hometown
G	0	Lavar Harewood	6 ft 3 in (1.91 m)	205 lb (93 kg)	RS Sr	Brooks HS; South Carolina State	Brooklyn, NY
G	1	Malcolm Porter	6 ft 4 in (1.93 m)	190 lb (86 kg)	RS Jr	Jesuit	Portland, OR
G	2	JoJo Walker	6 ft 1 in (1.85 m)	175 lb (79 kg)	Jr	St. Joseph	Carolina, PR
G	3	Isaiah White	6 ft 4 in (1.93 m)	195 lb (88 kg)	RS Sr	Centennial; Maine	Ellicott City, MD
G	5	Miles Turner (W)	6 ft 2 in (1.88 m)	190 lb (86 kg)	So	Tracy	Tracy, CA
G	10	Chase Adams	5 ft 7 in (1.7 m)	150 lb (68 kg)	Fr	Link Year Prep	Chicago, IL
C	11	Cody Collinsworth	7 ft 0 in (2.13 m)	230 lb (104 kg)	Fr	Lindale	Lindale, TX
C	12	Theo Akwuba	6 ft 11 in (2.11 m)	220 lb (100 kg)	So	Brewbaker Technology Magnet	Montgomery, AL
F	14	Tahirou Diabate	6 ft 9 in (2.06 m)	225 lb (102 kg)	Jr	Teikyo Nagaoka	Bamako, Mali
G	20	Takiula Faheresohn	6 ft 7 in (2.01 m)	185 lb (84 kg)	RS So	Auckland Grammar	Auckland, New Zealand
F	21	Josh Phillips	6 ft 8 in (2.03 m)	245 lb (111 kg)	So	Edison	Huntington Beach, CA
F/C	24	Jacob Tryon	6 ft 11 in (2.11 m)	210 lb (95 kg)	Jr	East Los Angeles College; Great Oak	Temecula, CA
F/C	32	Hugh Hogland	6 ft 10 in (2.08 m)	230 lb (104 kg)	RS So	ʻIolani School	Waimānalo, HI
F	34	Wyatt Watson (W)	6 ft 9 in (2.06 m)	195 lb (88 kg)	RS Fr	Sehome	Bellingham, WA

Head coach

- Terry Porter (UW–Stevens Point)

Assistant coach(es)

- Tyler Geving (Central Washington)
- Ben Johnson (Green Bay)
- Chris Buchanan (Arizona)

Legend

- (C) Team captain
- (S) Suspended
- (I) Ineligible
- (W) Walk-on
- Injured
- Current redshirt

Roster

== Schedule and results ==
Date time, TV	Rank^{#}	Opponent^{#}	Result	Record	High points	High rebounds	High assists	Site (attendance) city, state
Exhibition
November 2, 2019*; 7:30 pm		George Fox	W 89–72		20 – Diabate	13 – Diabate	6 – Adams	Chiles Center (1,212); Portland, OR
Non-conference regular season
November 5, 2019*; 7:00 pm		Willamette	W 86–36	1–0	13 – Tied	7 – Diabate	7 – Adams	Chiles Center (1,234); Portland, OR
November 8, 2019*; 8:00 pm, P12N		at USC	L 65–76	1–1	22 – White	7 – Tryon	4 – Adams	Galen Center (2,720); Los Angeles, CA
November 10, 2019*; 2:00 pm		at San Jose State	W 72–57	2–1	22 – Walker	5 – Tied	5 – Diabate	Provident Credit Union Event Center (1,441); San Jose, CA
November 16, 2019*; 7:00 pm		Maine	W 71–62	3–1	18 – Diabate	6 – Tied	7 – Adams	Chiles Center (1,721); Portland, OR
November 20, 2019*; 7:00 pm		at Portland State	W 82–75	4–1	21 – White	5 – Hogland	9 – Adams	Viking Pavilion (2,027); Portland, OR
November 23, 2019*; 1:00 pm		UC Davis	W 72–62	5–1	23 – White	12 – Tyron	5 – Adams	Chiles Center (1,286); Portland, OR
December 1, 2019*; 5:00 pm		Incarnate Word	W 65–56	6–1	15 – Tied	6 – Diabate	3 – Adams	Chiles Center (1,088); Portland, OR
December 4, 2019*; 7:00 pm		Cal State Northridge	L 64–71	6–2	15 – Walker	10 – Diabate	4 – Tied	Chiles Center (1,044); Portland, OR
December 7, 2019*; 7:00 pm		at Seattle; Elgin Baylor Classic	L 71–73	6–3	18 – White	9 – Tryon	5 – White	ShoWare Center (753); Kent, WA
December 13, 2019*; 7:00 pm		Evergreen State; Diamond Head Classic non-bracket game	W 77–55	7–3	16 – White	11 – Tyron	6 – Porter	Chiles Center (1,048); Portland, OR
December 16, 2019*; 7:00 pm		Florida A&M	W 66–60	8–3	19 – White	8 – Tryon	5 – Adams	Chiles Center (1,073); Portland, OR
December 19, 2019*; 7:30 pm		Jackson State	L 63–73	8–4	15 – Adams	10 – Fahrensohn	6 – Adams	Chiles Center (1,068); Portland, OR
December 22, 2019*; 12:00 pm, ESPNU		vs. Houston; Diamond Head Classic quarterfinals	L 56–81	8–5	11 – Porter	5 – Tied	3 – Tied	Stan Sheriff Center; Honolulu, HI
December 23, 2019*; 1:30 pm, ESPNU		vs. Boise State; Diamond Head Classic consolation 2nd round	L 69–85	8–6	19 – Adams	7 – Diabate	2 – Tied	Stan Sheriff Center; Honolulu, HI
December 25, 2019*; 10:30 am, ESPNU		vs. Ball State; Diamond Head Classic 7th place game	L 46–61	8–7	12 – Diabate	10 – Diabate	3 – Adams	Stan Sheriff Center; Honolulu, HI
WCC regular season
January 2, 2020; 7:00 pm, RTNW		No. 1 Gonzaga	L 72–85	8–8 (0–1)	15 – Walker	6 – Akwuba	6 – Adams	Chiles Center (4,633); Portland, OR
January 4, 2020; 7:00 pm, NBCSNW		San Francisco	W 76–65	9–8 (1–1)	19 – Walker	5 – Tied	6 – Walker	Chiles Center (1,745); Portland, OR
January 11, 2020; 6:00 pm, BYUtv		at BYU	L 70–96	9–9 (1–2)	16 – Porter	10 – Akwuba	8 – Tyron	Marriott Center (13,048); Provo, UT
January 16, 2020; 7:00 pm		Pacific	L 55–65	9–10 (1–3)	17 – Porter	8 – Diabate	2 – Diabate	Chiles Center (1,426); Portland, OR
January 18, 2020; 7:00 pm		San Diego	L 67–77	9–11 (1–4)	13 – White	9 – Tyron	4 – Adams	Chiles Center (1,689); Portland, OR
January 23, 2020; 7:00 pm		at Loyola Marymount	L 65–77	9–12 (1–5)	17 – Walker	8 – Tryon	5 – Adams	Gersten Pavilion (818); Los Angeles, CA
January 25, 2020; 5:00 pm		at Pepperdine	L 69–80	9–13 (1–6)	25 – Diabate	9 – Tryon	6 – Adams	Firestone Fieldhouse (1,315); Malibu, CA
January 30, 2020; 7:00 pm, Stadium		at Saint Mary's	L 64–86	9–14 (1–7)	18 – Diabate	6 – Diabate	3 – Adams	University Credit Union Pavilion (3,009); Moraga, CA
February 1, 2020; 7:00 pm		Santa Clara	L 61–85	9–15 (1–8)	15 – White	8 – Diabate	9 – Walker	Chiles Center (2,375); Portland, OR
February 6, 2020; 7:00 pm, Stadium		BYU	L 54–85	9–16 (1–9)	12 – Walker	6 – Tryon	3 – Ferebee	Chiles Center (3,013); Portland, OR
February 8, 2020; 7:00 pm		at San Diego	L 81–88 ^{2OT}	9–17 (1–10)	19 – Walker	11 – Akwuba	5 – Adams	Jenny Craig Pavilion (1,153); San Diego, CA
February 13, 2020; 7:00 pm		at Pacific	L 55–75	9–18 (1–11)	20 – Walker	4 – Tied	1 – Tied	Alex G. Spanos Center (1,785); Stockton, CA
February 20, 2020; 6:00 pm, RTNW		Pepperdine	L 59–66	9–19 (1–12)	12 – Diabate	6 – Diabate	3 – Adams	Chiles Center (1,679); Portland, OR
February 22, 2020; 7:00 pm, NBCSNW		Loyola Marymount	L 58–66	9–20 (1–13)	12 – Walker	6 – Diabate	4 – Tryon	Chiles Center (2,379); Portland, OR
February 27, 2020; 7:00 pm		at San Francisco	L 65–81	9–21 (1–14)	17 – Tied	7 – Diabate	5 – Adams	The Sobrato Center (2,225); San Francisco, CA
February 29, 2020; 1:00 pm		at Santa Clara	L 68–73	9–22 (1–15)	15 – Tryon	9 – Tryon	8 – Walker	Leavey Center (2,324); Santa Clara, CA
WCC tournament
March 5, 2020; 8:00 pm, BYUtv	(10)	vs. (7) Santa Clara; First round	L 62–76	9–23	15 – Walker	8 – Tryon	3 – Tied	Orleans Arena (1,983); Paradise, NV
*Non-conference game. ^{#}Rankings from AP Poll. (#) Tournament seedings in parentheses. All times are in Pacific Time.

Source: Schedule
