= 2019–20 San Francisco Dons men's basketball team =

American college basketball season

2019–20 San Francisco Dons men's basketball
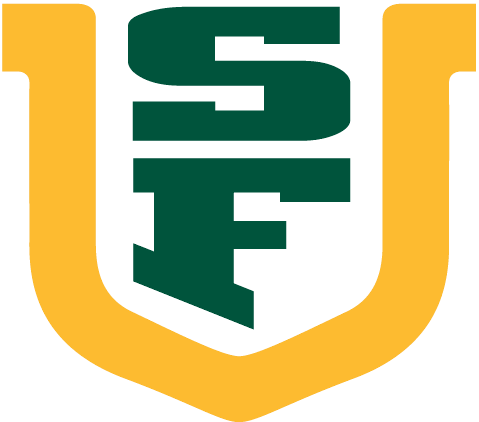
- Conference: West Coast Conference
- Record: 22–12 (9–7 WCC)
- Head coach: Todd Golden (1st season)
- Assistant coaches: Kevin Hovde; Mamadou N'Diaye; Vinnie McGhee
- Home arena: War Memorial Gymnasium; Chase Center

2019–20 West Coast Conference men's basketball standings
	Conf.				Overall
Team	W		L	PCT	W		L	PCT
No. 2 Gonzaga †	15	–	1	.938	31	–	2	.939
No. 14 BYU	13	–	3	.813	24	–	8	.750
Saint Mary's	11	–	5	.688	26	–	8	.765
Pacific	11	–	5	.688	23	–	10	.697
San Francisco	9	–	7	.563	22	–	12	.647
Pepperdine	8	–	8	.500	16	–	16	.500
Santa Clara	6	–	10	.375	20	–	13	.606
Loyola Marymount	4	–	12	.250	11	–	21	.344
San Diego	2	–	14	.125	9	–	23	.281
Portland	1	–	15	.063	9	–	23	.281
† 2020 WCC tournament winner Rankings from AP poll

The 2019–20 San Francisco Dons men's basketball team represented the University of San Francisco during the 2019–20 NCAA Division I men's basketball season. The Dons, led by first-year head coach Todd Golden, played their home games at the War Memorial Gymnasium or the Chase Center as members of the West Coast Conference. They finished the season 22–12, 9–7 in WCC play to finish in fifth place. They defeated Loyola Marymount in the second round and Pacific in the third round to advance to the semifinals of the WCC tournament where they lost to Gonzaga.

== Previous season ==
The Dons finished the 2018–19 season 21–10, 9–7 in WCC play to finish in fourth place. They lost in the Third Round to Pepperdine of the WCC tournament. Despite having 21 wins and a better record they were not invited to a postseason tournament.

On March 27, Kyle Smith left for San Francisco to accept the head coach position at Washington State. He finished with a five-year record of 63–40 with two CBI appearances. The Dons promoted assistant Todd Golden to head coaching position the following day.

== Offseason ==
=== Departures ===
Name	Number	Pos.	Height	Weight	Year	Hometown	Reason for departure
Frankie Ferrari	2	G	5'11"	179	Senior	Burlingame, CA	Graduated
Michael Orlich	3	G	5'11"	180	Junior	Fresno, CA	Walk-on; left the team for personal reasons
Matthew McCarthy	10	F	6'9"	232	Senior	Melbourne, Australia	Graduated
Nate Renfro	15	F	6'8"	202	Senior	Tucson, AZ	Graduated
Dylan Belquist	21	F	6'6"	190	Freshman	Los Gatos, CA	Transferred to Salt Lake CC
Nathan Krill	31	F	6'7"	210	RS Senior	St. Helena, CA	Graduated
Mladen Djordjevic	45	G	6'3"	184	Senior	Belgrade, Serbia	Graduated

=== Incoming transfers ===
Name	Number	Pos.	Height	Weight	Year	Hometown	Previous School
Damari Milstead	15	G	6'2"	190	Junior	Oakland, CA	Transferred from Grand Canyon. Under NCAA transfer rules, Milstead will have to sit out for the 2019–20 season. Will have two years of remaining eligibility.

=== 2019 recruiting class ===
College recruiting information
Name	Hometown	School	Height	Weight	Commit date
Isaiah Hawthorne; SF	Tracy, CA	Tracy High School	6 ft 8 in (2.03 m)	175 lb (79 kg)	
Isaiah Hawthorne; SF	Recruit ratings: Scout: Rivals: (NR)				
Josh Kunen; PF	Ballarat, Australia	Centre of Excellence	6 ft 8 in (2.03 m)	N/A	
Josh Kunen; PF	Recruit ratings: Scout: Rivals: (NR)				
Jonas Visser; C	Rijnsburg, Netherlands	Centre for Elite Sports	6 ft 10 in (2.08 m)	223 lb (101 kg)	Aug 2, 2019
Jonas Visser; C	Recruit ratings: Scout: Rivals: (NR)				
Overall recruit ranking: Scout: nr Rivals: nr ESPN: nr
Note: In many cases, Scout, Rivals, 247Sports, On3, and ESPN may conflict in their listings of height and weight.; In these cases, the average was taken. ESPN grades are on a 100-point scale.; Sources: "San Francisco Dons 2019 Basketball Commitments". Rivals.; "2019 San Francisco Dons Basketball Commits". Scout.; "ESPN". ESPN.; "Scout.com Team Recruiting Rankings". Scout.; "2019 Team Ranking". Rivals.

== Roster ==
2019–20 San Francisco Dons men's basketball team
Players
Coaches

Pos.	#	Name	Height	Weight	Year	Previous school	Hometown
G	0	Khalil Shabazz	6 ft 1 in (1.85 m)	170 lb (77 kg)	RS So	Rainier Beach; Central Washington	Seattle, WA
G	1	Jamaree Bouyea	6 ft 2 in (1.88 m)	155 lb (70 kg)	Jr	Palma	Seaside, CA
G	2	Justin Bieker (W)	6 ft 5 in (1.96 m)	170 lb (77 kg)	Fr	Jesuit	Portland, OR
F	3	Isaiah Hawthorne	6 ft 8 in (2.03 m)	175 lb (79 kg)	Fr	Tracy	Tracy, CA
C	5	Jimbo Lull	7 ft 0 in (2.13 m)	252 lb (114 kg)	Sr	New Hampton School	Manhattan Beach, CA
F	10	Josh Kunen	6 ft 8 in (2.03 m)	200 lb (91 kg)	Fr	Centre of Excellence	Melbourne, Australia
F	11	Remu Raitanen	6 ft 9 in (2.06 m)	198 lb (90 kg)	Sr	Helsinki Basketball Academy	Helsinki, Finland
G	12	Trevante Anderson	6 ft 2 in (1.88 m)	185 lb (84 kg)	So	Lincoln	Tacoma, WA
G	14	Charles Minlend	6 ft 4 in (1.93 m)	208 lb (94 kg)	RS Jr	Fork Union Military Academy	Concord, NC
G	15	Damari Milstead (redshirt)	6 ft 2 in (1.88 m)	190 lb (86 kg)	Jr	Moreau Catholic; Grand Canyon	Oakland, CA
F	22	Dzmitry Ryuny	6 ft 9 in (2.06 m)	200 lb (91 kg)	So	Central Park Christian Schools	Minsk, Belarus
G	25	Jordan Ratinho	6 ft 5 in (1.96 m)	210 lb (95 kg)	Sr	De La Salle	Livermore, CA
C	31	Jonas Visser	6 ft 10 in (2.08 m)	223 lb (101 kg)	Fr	Centre for Sports & Education	Amsterdam, Netherlands
F	34	Taavi Jurkatamm	6 ft 9 in (2.06 m)	210 lb (95 kg)	Jr	Audentes Sports Gymnasium	Tallinn, Estonia
G	45	Emmanuel Nwabueze (W)	6 ft 3 in (1.91 m)	210 lb (95 kg)	Fr	International	San Francisco, CA

Head coach

- Todd Golden (Saint Mary's)

Assistant coach(es)

- Kevin Hovde (Richmond)
- Mamadou N'Diaye (Auburn)
- Vinnie McGhee (Cal State Northridge)

Legend

- (C) Team captain
- (S) Suspended
- (I) Ineligible
- (W) Walk-on
- Injured
- Current redshirt

Roster

== Schedule and results ==
Date time, TV	Rank^{#}	Opponent^{#}	Result	Record	Site (attendance) city, state
Non-conference regular season
November 5, 2019*; 7:00 pm		Sonoma State	W 101–50	1–0	War Memorial Gymnasium (1,002); San Francisco, CA
November 9, 2019*; 6:00 pm		Princeton	W 87–72	2–0	Chase Center (6,892); San Francisco, CA
November 11, 2019*; 6:00 pm		Yale	W 84–79 ^{OT}	3–0	War Memorial Gymnasium (1,727); San Francisco, CA
November 16, 2019*; 5:00 pm		at Southern Illinois	W 76–60	4–0	Banterra Center (4,488); Carbondale, IL
November 19, 2019*; 7:00 pm		Cal State Bakersfield	W 100–70	5–0	War Memorial Gymnasium (1,503); San Francisco, CA
November 23, 2019*; 5:00 pm		Sam Houston State	W 90–81	6–0	War Memorial Gymnasium (1,705); San Francisco, CA
November 26, 2019*; 12:00 pm		Hampton	W 89–73	7–0	War Memorial Gymnasium (1,211); San Francisco, CA
November 29, 2019*; 9:30 pm		at Hawaii	L 75–85	7–1	Stan Sheriff Center (6,200); Honolulu, HI
December 3, 2019*; 8:00 pm, CBSSN		Arizona State	L 67–71	7–2	War Memorial Gymnasium (2,892); San Francisco, CA
December 4, 2019*; 8:00 pm, CBSSN		California	W 76–64	8–2	War Memorial Gymnasium (3,006); San Francisco, CA
December 14, 2019*; 2:00 pm		at Cal State Fullerton	W 91–69	9–2	Titan Gym (601); Fullerton, CA
December 17, 2019*; 6:00 pm, P12N		at Stanford	L 56–64	9–3	Maples Pavilion (3,303); Stanford, CA
December 21, 2019*; 2:00 pm		UC Davis	W 93–84	10–3	War Memorial Gymnasium (1,745); San Francisco, CA
December 23, 2019*; 7:00 pm		at Fresno State	W 71–69	11–3	Save Mart Center (4,693); Fresno, CA
December 30, 2019*; 6:00 pm		Harvard	L 81–84 ^{OT}	11–4	War Memorial Gymnasium (2,315); San Francisco, CA
WCC regular season
January 2, 2020; 8:00 pm, ESPNU		Saint Mary's	L 58–69	11–5 (0–1)	War Memorial Gymnasium (3,006); San Francisco, CA
January 4, 2020; 7:00 pm		at Portland	L 65–76	11–6 (0–2)	Chiles Center (1,745); Portland, OR
January 9, 2020; 8:00 pm, NBCSBA		Santa Clara	W 80–61	12–6 (1–2)	War Memorial Gymnasium (2,207); San Francisco, CA
January 11, 2020; 4:00 pm, NBCSBA		at Pacific	W 79–75	13–6 (2–2)	Alex G. Spanos Center (2,382); Stockton, CA
January 18, 2020; 1:00 pm, NBCSCA		Loyola Marymount	W 61–53	14–6 (3–2)	War Memorial Gymnasium (2,370); San Francisco, CA
January 23, 2020; 7:30 pm, CBSSN		at Saint Mary's	L 48–58	14–7 (3–3)	University Credit Union Pavilion (3,422); Moraga, CA
January 25, 2020; 2:00 pm, Stadium		BYU	W 83–82	15–7 (4–3)	War Memorial Gymnasium (3,006); San Francisco, CA
January 30, 2020; 7:00 pm		at San Diego	W 69–44	16–7 (5–3)	Jenny Craig Pavilion (1,642); San Diego, CA
February 1, 2020; 1:00 pm, RTNW		No. 2 Gonzaga	L 79–83	16–8 (5–4)	War Memorial Gymnasium (3,006); San Francisco, CA
February 6, 2020; 8:00 pm		Pacific	L 48–60	16–9 (5–5)	War Memorial Gymnasium (1,748); San Francisco, CA
February 8, 2020; 6:00 pm		at BYU	L 76–90	16–10 (5–6)	Marriott Center (14,757); Provo, UT
February 13, 2020; 6:00 pm		at Santa Clara	W 70–61	17–10 (6–6)	Leavey Center (2,077); Santa Clara, CA
February 20, 2020; 8:00 pm, ESPN2		at No. 2 Gonzaga	L 54–71	17–11 (6–7)	McCarthey Athletic Center (6,000); Spokane, WA
February 22, 2020; 3:00 pm		Pepperdine	W 63–61 ^{OT}	18–11 (7–7)	War Memorial Gymnasium (2,937); San Francisco, CA
February 27, 2020; 7:00 pm		Portland	W 81–65	19–11 (8–7)	War Memorial Gymnasium (2,225); San Francisco, CA
February 29, 2020; 5:00 pm, Stadium		at Loyola Marymount	W 69–67	20–11 (9–7)	Gersten Pavilion (2,916); Los Angeles, CA
WCC tournament
March 6, 2020; 6:00 pm, BYUtv	(5)	vs. (8) Loyola Marymount; Second round	W 82–53	21–11	Orleans Arena (3,850); Paradise, NV
March 7, 2020; 7:00 pm, ESPN2	(5)	vs. (4) Pacific; Third round	W 72–54	22–11	Orleans Arena (4,350); Paradise, NV
March 9, 2020; 6:00 pm, ESPN	(5)	vs. (1) No. 2 Gonzaga; Semifinals	L 77–81	22–12	Orleans Arena (7,471); Paradise, NV
*Non-conference game. ^{#}Rankings from AP Poll. (#) Tournament seedings in parentheses. All times are in Pacific Time.
