= 2019–20 Santa Clara Broncos men's basketball team =

American college basketball season

2019–20 Santa Clara Broncos men's basketball
- Conference: West Coast Conference
- Record: 20–13 (6–10 WCC)
- Head coach: Herb Sendek (4th season)
- Assistant coaches: Jason Ludwig; Scott Garson; Ryan Madry
- Home arena: Leavey Center

2019–20 West Coast Conference men's basketball standings
	Conf.				Overall
Team	W		L	PCT	W		L	PCT
No. 2 Gonzaga †	15	–	1	.938	31	–	2	.939
No. 14 BYU	13	–	3	.813	24	–	8	.750
Saint Mary's	11	–	5	.688	26	–	8	.765
Pacific	11	–	5	.688	23	–	10	.697
San Francisco	9	–	7	.563	22	–	12	.647
Pepperdine	8	–	8	.500	16	–	16	.500
Santa Clara	6	–	10	.375	20	–	13	.606
Loyola Marymount	4	–	12	.250	11	–	21	.344
San Diego	2	–	14	.125	9	–	23	.281
Portland	1	–	15	.063	9	–	23	.281
† 2020 WCC tournament winner Rankings from AP poll

The 2019–20 Santa Clara Broncos men's basketball team represented Santa Clara University during the 2019–20 NCAA Division I men's basketball season. The Broncos were led by fourth-year head coach Herb Sendek and played their home games at the Leavey Center as members of the West Coast Conference. They finished the season 20–13, 6–10 in WCC play to finish in seventh place. They defeated Portland in the first round of the WCC tournament before losing in the second round to Pepperdine.

== Previous season ==
The Broncos finished the 2018–19 season 16–15, 8–8 in WCC play to finish in a tie for fourth place. They lost in the second round of the WCC tournament to San Diego.

== Departures ==
Name	Number	Pos.	Height	Weight	Year	Hometown	Reason for departure
Henrik Jädersten	3	F	6'11"	240	Senior	Stockholm, Sweden	Graduated
K. J. Feagin	10	G	6'1"	190	Senior	Long Beach, CA	Graduated
Matt Hauser	12	G	6'1"	180	Senior	Thousand Oaks, CA	Graduated
Johnny Swayer	20	G	6'2"	190	Junior	Hyattsville, MD	Walk-on; left the team for personal reasons
Josh Martin	22	F	6'7"	230	RS Senior	Seattle, WA	Graduated
Fallou Ndoye	25	C	6'11"	225	RS Senior	Taif, Senegal	Graduated
Matt Jasaitis	33	G	5'11"	170	RS Senior	Manhattan Beach, CA	Walk-on; graduated

=== Incoming transfers ===
Name	Number	Pos.	Height	Weight	Year	Hometown	Previous School
David Thompson	1	G	6'0"	170	Junior	Whitefish Bay, WI	Junior college transferred from Mt. San Jacinto College

== Recruiting ==
College recruiting information
Name	Hometown	School	Height	Weight	Commit date
Jaden Bediako; C	Brampton, ON	Ridley College	6 ft 10 in (2.08 m)	N/A	
Jaden Bediako; C	Recruit ratings: (NR)				
Giordan Williams; SG	Long Beach, CA	Long Beach Polytechnic High School	6 ft 4 in (1.93 m)	N/A	
Giordan Williams; SG	Recruit ratings: (NR)				
Jalen Williams; SG	Gilbert, AZ	Perry High School	6 ft 3 in (1.91 m)	N/A	
Jalen Williams; SG	Recruit ratings: (NR)				
Miguel Tomley; PG	Surrey, BC	Tamanawis Secondary School	6 ft 3 in (1.91 m)	185 lb (84 kg)	Jul 29, 2018
Miguel Tomley; PG	Recruit ratings: (NR)				
Overall recruit ranking: Scout: nr Rivals: nr ESPN: nr
Note: In many cases, Scout, Rivals, 247Sports, On3, and ESPN may conflict in their listings of height and weight.; In these cases, the average was taken. ESPN grades are on a 100-point scale.; Sources: "Santa Clara 2019 Basketball Commitments". Rivals.; "2019 Santa Clara Basketball Commits". Scout.; "ESPN". ESPN.; "Scout.com Team Recruiting Rankings". Scout.; "2019 Team Ranking". Rivals.

== Roster ==
2019–20 Santa Clara Broncos men's basketball team
Players
Coaches

Pos.	#	Name	Height	Weight	Year	Previous school	Hometown
F	0	D. J. Mitchell	6 ft 8 in (2.03 m)	215 lb (98 kg)	RS Jr	Buchanan; Wake Forest	Clovis, CA
G	1	David Thompson	6 ft 0 in (1.83 m)	165 lb (75 kg)	Jr	Whitefish Bay; Mt. San Jacinto College	Milwaukee, WI
G	2	Tahj Eaddy	6 ft 2 in (1.88 m)	165 lb (75 kg)	RS Jr	Tennessee Prep; Southeast Missouri State	West Haven, CT
G	3	Trey Wertz	6 ft 4 in (1.93 m)	185 lb (84 kg)	So	Providence Day	Charlotte, NC
G	4	Giordan Williams	6 ft 3 in (1.91 m)	165 lb (75 kg)	Fr	Long Beach Poly	Long Beach, CA
G	10	Miguel Tomley	6 ft 3 in (1.91 m)	185 lb (84 kg)	Fr	Tamanawis	Surrey, BC
C	12	Jaden Bediako	6 ft 10 in (2.08 m)	240 lb (109 kg)	Fr	Ridley College	Brampton, ON
F	13	Josip Vrankic	6 ft 9 in (2.06 m)	215 lb (98 kg)	Jr	Wasatch Academy	Toronto, ON
F	14	Keshawn Justice	6 ft 7 in (2.01 m)	220 lb (100 kg)	So	Madison East	Madison, WI
F	15	Juan Ducasse	6 ft 9 in (2.06 m)	210 lb (95 kg)	RS Fr	Lee Academy	Montevideo, Uruguay
C	23	Ezekiel Richards	6 ft 10 in (2.08 m)	240 lb (109 kg)	So	Oak Park	Oak Park, CA
G	24	Jalen Williams	6 ft 6 in (1.98 m)	190 lb (86 kg)	Fr	Perry	Gilbert, AZ
F	30	Guglielmo Caruso	6 ft 11 in (2.11 m)	210 lb (95 kg)	So	Cuore Napoli Basket Team	Naples, Italy

Head coach

- Herb Sendek (Carnegie Mellon)

Assistant coach(es)

- Jason Ludwig (UCLA)
- Scott Garson (UC Santa Barbara)
- Ryan Madry (West Georgia)

Legend

- (C) Team captain
- (S) Suspended
- (I) Ineligible
- (W) Walk-on
- Injured
- Current redshirt

Roster

== Schedule and results ==
Date time, TV	Rank^{#}	Opponent^{#}	Result	Record	High points	High rebounds	High assists	Site (attendance) city, state
Non-conference regular season
November 5, 2019*; 7:00 pm		UC Santa Cruz	W 97–52	1–0	18 – Mitchell	7 – Tied	5 – Wertz	Leavey Center (1,420); Santa Clara, CA
November 8, 2019*; 7:00 pm		Cal Poly	W 77–63	2–0	18 – Mitchell	10 – Caruso	5 – Wertz	Leavey Center (2,000); Santa Clara, CA
November 12, 2019*; 7:00 pm		Washington State	W 70–62	3–0	22 – Caruso	10 – Caruso	3 – Vrankic	Leavey Center (1,202); Santa Clara, CA
November 16, 2019*; 7:00 pm, P12N		at Stanford	L 64–82	3–1	13 – Vrankic	5 – Tied	4 – Tied	Maples Pavilion (3,491); Stanford, CA
November 19, 2019*; 7:00 pm		Notre Dame de Namur; Cable Car Classic	W 101–54	4–1	14 – 3 Tied	10 – Mitchell	6 – Wertz	Leavey Center (1,127); Santa Clara, CA
November 22, 2019*; 7:00 pm		Idaho State	W 78–65	5–1	12 – Tied	5 – Bediako	7 – Vrankic	Leavey Center (1,146); Santa Clara, CA
November 27, 2019*; 2:00 pm		Denver; Cable Car Classic	W 81–64	6–1	19 – Eaddy	10 – Vrankic	7 – Vrankic	Leavey Center (912); Santa Clara, CA
November 29, 2019*; 2:00 pm		Southeast Missouri State; Cable Car Classic	W 87–75	7–1	24 – Wertz	5 – Wertz	5 – Wertz	Leavey Center (1,009); Santa Clara, CA
November 30, 2019*; 3:30 pm		Cal State Fullerton; Cable Car Classic	W 70–55	8–1	17 – Vrankic	7 – Mitchell	4 – Vrankic	Leavey Center (993); Santa Clara, CA
December 4, 2019*; 7:00 pm		at Nevada	L 67–98	8–2	8 – Tied	7 – Vrankic	3 – Wertz	Lawlor Events Center (7,577); Reno, NV
December 7, 2019*; 2:00 pm		California	W 71–52	9–2	16 – Caruso	12 – Caruso	5 – Wertz	Leavey Center (2,326); Santa Clara, CA
December 14, 2019*; 2:00 pm		Sacramento State	W 60–58	10–2	15 – Vrankic	6 – Caruso	5 – Vrankic	Leavey Center (1,008); Santa Clara, CA
December 18, 2019*; 7:00 pm		San Jose State	W 89–84	11–2	25 – Caruso	6 – Tied	9 – Wertz	Leavey Center (1,165); Santa Clara, CA
December 20, 2019*; 7:00 pm		Mississippi Valley State	W 100–71	12–2	28 – Wertz	8 – Mitchell	6 – Williams	Leavey Center (875); Santa Clara, CA
December 29, 2019*; 2:00 pm		Alcorn State	W 92–57	13–2	24 – Justice	9 – Vrankic	7 – Vrankic	Leavey Center (1,242); Santa Clara, CA
WCC regular season
January 4, 2020; 2:00 pm		San Diego	W 80–63	14–2 (1–0)	26 – Justice	7 – Vrankic	5 – Wertz	Leavey Center (1,361); Santa Clara, CA
January 9, 2020; 8:00 pm, NBCSBA		at San Francisco	L 61–80	14–3 (1–1)	21 – Mitchell	6 – Mitchell	1 – 4 tied	War Memorial Gymnasium (2,207); San Francisco, CA
January 11, 2020; 5:00 pm, ESPNU		at Saint Mary's	W 67–66	15–3 (2–1)	22 – Vrankic	10 – Vrankic	3 – Tied	University Credit Union Pavilion (3,500); Moraga, CA
January 16, 2020; 8:00 pm, ESPN2		at No. 1 Gonzaga	L 54–104	15–4 (2–2)	12 – Vrankic	10 – Bediako	2 – Wertz	McCarthey Athletic Center (6,000); Spokane, WA
January 18, 2020; 6:00 pm		Pacific	W 84–80	16–4 (3–2)	31 – Wertz	8 – Mitchell	3 – Tied	Leavey Center (1,760); Santa Clara, CA
January 23, 2020; 7:00 pm, NBCSCA		Pepperdine	L 86–90 ^{OT}	16–5 (3–3)	33 – Vrankic	13 – Bediako	7 – Wertz	Leavey Center (1,914); Santa Clara, CA
January 25, 2020; 3:00 pm		at San Diego	W 65–52	17–5 (4–3)	20 – Vrankic	9 – Vrankic	4 – Eaddy	Jenny Craig Pavilion (2,038); San Diego, CA
January 30, 2020; 7:30 pm, CBSSN		No. 2 Gonzaga	L 72–87	17–6 (4–4)	17 – Mitchell	12 – Vrankic	5 – Tied	Leavey Center (4,200); Santa Clara, CA
February 1, 2020; 5:00 pm		at Portland	W 85–61	18–6 (5–4)	17 – Justice	9 – Bediako	9 – Wertz	Chiles Center (2,375); Portland, OR
February 6, 2020; 7:00 pm		at Pepperdine	L 77–91	18–7 (5–5)	19 – Bediako	9 – Bediako	5 – Wertz	Firestone Fieldhouse (1,349); Malibu, CA
February 13, 2020; 6:00 pm, NBCSCA		San Francisco	L 61–70	18–8 (5–6)	14 – Bediako	10 – Mitchell	5 – Wertz	Leavey Center (2,077); Santa Clara, CA
February 15, 2020; 2:00 pm		Loyola Marymount	L 59–75	18–9 (5–7)	17 – Vrankic	11 – Bediako	4 – Tied	Leavey Center (1,862); Santa Clara, CA
February 20, 2020; 6:00 pm, CBSSN		at No. 23 BYU	L 75–85	18–10 (5–8)	28 – Vrankic	11 – Vrankic	6 – Mitchell	Marriott Center (12,757); Provo, UT
February 22, 2020; 7:00 pm		at Pacific	L 74–87	18–11 (5–9)	18 – Mitchell	7 – Bediako	1 – 5 tied	Alex G. Spanos Center (3,043); Stockton, CA
February 27, 2020; 7:00 pm, CBSSN		Saint Mary's	L 72–78	18–12 (5–10)	20 – Eaddy	9 – Justice	5 – Eaddy	Leavey Center (2,512); Santa Clara, CA
February 29, 2020; 1:00 pm, NBCSCA		Portland	W 73–68	19–12 (6–10)	25 – Mitchell	8 – Justice	3 – Tied	Leavey Center (2,324); Santa Clara, CA
WCC tournament
March 5, 2020; 8:00 pm, BYUtv	(7)	vs. (10) Portland; First round	W 76–62	20–12	17 – Mitchell	9 – Justice	5 – Tied	Orleans Arena (1,983); Paradise, NV
March 6, 2020; 8:00 pm, BYUtv	(7)	vs. (6) Pepperdine; Second round	L 73–84	20–13	18 – Vrankic	6 – Tied	4 – Eaddy	Orleans Arena (3,850); Paradise, NV
*Non-conference game. ^{#}Rankings from AP Poll. (#) Tournament seedings in parentheses. All times are in Pacific Time.
