= 2019–20 Saint Mary's Gaels men's basketball team =

American college basketball season

2019–20 Saint Mary's Gaels men's basketball
- Conference: West Coast Conference
- Record: 26–8 (11–5 WCC)
- Head coach: Randy Bennett (19th season)
- Assistant coaches: Marcus Schroeder; Justin Joyner; Mickey McConnell
- Home arena: University Credit Union Pavilion

2019–20 West Coast Conference men's basketball standings
	Conf.				Overall
Team	W		L	PCT	W		L	PCT
No. 2 Gonzaga †	15	–	1	.938	31	–	2	.939
No. 14 BYU	13	–	3	.813	24	–	8	.750
Saint Mary's	11	–	5	.688	26	–	8	.765
Pacific	11	–	5	.688	23	–	10	.697
San Francisco	9	–	7	.563	22	–	12	.647
Pepperdine	8	–	8	.500	16	–	16	.500
Santa Clara	6	–	10	.375	20	–	13	.606
Loyola Marymount	4	–	12	.250	11	–	21	.344
San Diego	2	–	14	.125	9	–	23	.281
Portland	1	–	15	.063	9	–	23	.281
† 2020 WCC tournament winner Rankings from AP poll

The 2019–20 Saint Mary's Gaels men's basketball team represented Saint Mary's College of California during the 2019–20 NCAA Division I men's basketball season. The team was led by head coach Randy Bennett in his 19th season at Saint Mary's. The Gaels played their home games at the University Credit Union Pavilion in Moraga, California as members of the West Coast Conference. They finished the season 26–8, 11–5 in WCC play to finish in a tie for third place. They defeated Pepperdine and BYU to advance to the championship game of the WCC tournament where they lost to Gonzaga. Despite being a virtual lock to receive an at-large bid to NCAA tournament, all postseason play was cancelled amid the COVID-19 pandemic.

== Previous season ==
The Gaels finished the 2018–19 season 22–12, 11–5 in West Coast Conference play to finish in second place. As the No. 2 seed in the WCC tournament, they defeated Pepperdine in the semifinals and upset No. 1 seed Gonzaga to become champions of the WCC Tournament. As a result, they received an automatic bid to the NCAA tournament as a No. 11 where they lost to Villanova in the first round.

== Offseason ==
=== Departures ===
Name	Number	Pos.	Height	Weight	Year	Hometown	Reason for departure
Jordan Hunter	1	C	6'10"	230	Senior	Vaucluse, Australia	Graduated
Kyle Clark	33	F	6'7"	220	RS Junior	Wynyard, Australia	Injured. Recovering from right knee surgery. 5th year senior. Studying MBA.
Alex Mudronja	35	G	6'5"	195	Freshman	Adelaide, Australia	Play professionally

=== Incoming transfers ===
Name	Number	Pos.	Height	Weight	Year	Hometown	Previous school
Logan Johnson	1	G	6'2"	175	Sophomore	Mountain View, CA	Transferred from Cincinnati. Johnson was granted a waiver for immediate eligibility. Will have three years of remaining eligibility.

=== 2019 recruiting class ===
College recruiting information
Name	Hometown	School	Height	Weight	Commit date
Alex Ducas; SF	Geraldton, AUS	Centre of Excellence	6 ft 6 in (1.98 m)	N/A	
Alex Ducas; SF	Recruit ratings: Scout: Rivals:				
Kyle Bowen; PF	Perth, AUS	Centre of Excellence	6 ft 8 in (2.03 m)	N/A	
Kyle Bowen; PF	Recruit ratings: No ratings found				
Overall recruit ranking: Scout: nr Rivals: nr ESPN: nr
Note: In many cases, Scout, Rivals, 247Sports, On3, and ESPN may conflict in their listings of height and weight.; In these cases, the average was taken. ESPN grades are on a 100-point scale.; Sources: "ESPN". ESPN.; "2019 Team Ranking". Rivals.

=== 2020 recruiting class ===
College recruiting information (2020)
Name	Hometown	School	Height	Weight	Commit date
Judah Brown; SF	Santa Monica, CA	Pacifica Christian High School	6 ft 7 in (2.01 m)	180 lb (82 kg)	Jan 7, 2019
Judah Brown; SF	Recruit ratings: (79)				
Jabe Mullins; SG	Snoqualmie, WA	Mount Si High School	6 ft 5 in (1.96 m)	195 lb (88 kg)	Sep 25, 2019
Jabe Mullins; SG	Recruit ratings: No ratings found				
Mitchell Saxen; SG	Seattle, WA	Ingraham High School	6 ft 5 in (1.96 m)	195 lb (88 kg)	Sep 18, 2019
Mitchell Saxen; SG	Recruit ratings: No ratings found				
Overall recruit ranking: Scout: nr Rivals: nr ESPN: nr
Note: In many cases, Scout, Rivals, 247Sports, On3, and ESPN may conflict in their listings of height and weight.; In these cases, the average was taken. ESPN grades are on a 100-point scale.; Sources: "ESPN". ESPN.; "2020 Team Ranking". Rivals.

== Roster ==
2019–20 Saint Mary's Gaels men's basketball team
Players
Coaches

Pos.	#	Name	Height	Weight	Year	Previous school	Hometown
G	00	Tanner Krebs	6 ft 6 in (1.98 m)	205 lb (93 kg)	RS Sr	Lake Ginninderra College	Hobart, Australia
G	1	Logan Johnson	6 ft 2 in (1.88 m)	175 lb (79 kg)	So	Saint Francis; Cincinnati	Mountain View, California
G	2	Quinn Clinton	6 ft 3 in (1.91 m)	190 lb (86 kg)	So	Christchurch Boys	Christchurch, New Zealand
G	3	Jordan Ford	6 ft 1 in (1.85 m)	175 lb (79 kg)	Sr	Folsom	Folsom, CA
C	5	Jock Perry	7 ft 1 in (2.16 m)	250 lb (113 kg)	RS Jr	Lake Ginninderra College	Melbourne, Australia
F	10	Elijah Thomas	6 ft 5 in (1.96 m)	220 lb (100 kg)	RS Jr	Sunrise Mountain	Peoria, AZ
F/C	11	Matthias Tass	6 ft 10 in (2.08 m)	240 lb (109 kg)	So	Tallinn Secondary School of Science	Tallinn, Estonia
G	12	Tommy Kuhse (W)	6 ft 2 in (1.88 m)	180 lb (82 kg)	RS Jr	Mountain View	Mesa, AZ
F	14	Kyle Bowen	6 ft 8 in (2.03 m)	220 lb (100 kg)	Fr	Centre of Excellence	Perth, WA, Australia
F	15	Dan Sheets (W)	6 ft 5 in (1.96 m)	205 lb (93 kg)	RS Sr	Dougherty Valley	San Ramon, CA
G	23	Kristers Zoriks	6 ft 4 in (1.93 m)	190 lb (86 kg)	RS So	New Hampton School	Dobele, Latvia
F	24	Malik Fitts	6 ft 8 in (2.03 m)	230 lb (104 kg)	RS Jr	Brewster Academy; South Florida	Rancho Cucamonga, CA
C	41	Aaron Menzies	7 ft 3 in (2.21 m)	265 lb (120 kg)	RS Sr	Loreto Academy; Seattle	Manchester, England
F	42	Dan Fotu	6 ft 7 in (2.01 m)	220 lb (100 kg)	So	New Zealand	Auckland, New Zealand
G/F	44	Alex Ducas	6 ft 6 in (1.98 m)	215 lb (98 kg)	Fr	Centre of Excellence	Geraldton, WA, Australia

Head coach

- Randy Bennett (UC San Diego)

Assistant coach(es)

- Marcus Schroeder (Princeton)
- Justin Joyner (UC Santa Barbara)
- Mickey McConnell (Saint Mary's)

Legend

- (C) Team captain
- (S) Suspended
- (I) Ineligible
- (W) Walk-on
- Injured
- Current redshirt

Roster

== Schedule and results ==
Date time, TV	Rank^{#}	Opponent^{#}	Result	Record	Site (attendance) city, state
Non-conference regular season
November 5, 2019*; 6:00 pm, ESPNU	No. 20	vs. Wisconsin; Sioux Falls Showcase	W 65–63 ^{OT}	1–0	Sanford Pentagon (3,301); Sioux Falls, SD
November 11, 2019*; 6:00 pm	No. 18	Winthrop; Sacramento Classic	L 59–61	1–1	University Credit Union Pavilion (2,895); Moraga, CA
November 14, 2019*; 7:00 pm	No. 18	Long Beach State	W 81–63	2–1	University Credit Union Pavilion (2,715); Moraga, CA
November 17, 2019*; 5:00 pm	No. 18	Cal Poly	W 79–48	3–1	University Credit Union Pavilion (3,306); Moraga, CA
November 20, 2019*; 8:00 pm, ESPNU		vs. Fresno State; Sacramento Classic	W 68–58	4–1	Golden 1 Center (4,774); Sacramento, CA
November 23, 2019*; 5:00 pm		Lehigh; Sacramento Classic	W 77–66	5–1	University Credit Union Pavilion (3,059); Moraga, CA
November 24, 2019*; 7:00 pm		Sonoma State	W 107–56	6–1	University Credit Union Pavilion (2,742); Moraga, CA
November 29, 2019*; 8:30 pm, ESPNU		No. 15 Utah State	W 81–73	7–1	University Credit Union Pavilion (3,500); Moraga, CA
December 1, 2019*; 5:00 pm		Omaha	W 75–66	8–1	University Credit Union Pavilion (2,766); Moraga, CA
December 5, 2019*; 7:00 pm		Northern Illinois	W 61–49	9–1	University Credit Union Pavilion (2,816); Moraga, CA
December 8, 2019*; 1:00 pm, ESPNU		vs. No. 19 Dayton; Jerry Colangelo Classic	L 68–78	9–2	Talking Stick Resort Arena (3,563); Phoenix, AZ
December 14, 2019*; 7:30 pm, P12N		at California	W 89–77	10–2	Haas Pavilion (5,734); Berkeley, CA
December 18, 2019*; 6:00 pm, P12N		vs. Arizona State; Basketball Hall of Fame Showcase	W 96–56	11–2	Talking Stick Resort Arena (6,892); Phoenix, AZ
December 21, 2019*; 9:30 pm, ESPNU		vs. Nevada; Al Attles Classic	W 68–63	12–2	Chase Center (6,728); San Francisco, CA
December 28, 2019*; 5:00 pm		Seattle	W 84–58	13–2	University Credit Union Pavilion (3,500); Moraga, CA
WCC regular season
January 2, 2020; 8:00 pm, ESPNU		at San Francisco	W 69–58	14–2 (1–0)	War Memorial Gymnasium (3,006); San Francisco, CA
January 4, 2020; 7:00 pm, Stadium		at Pacific	L 99–107 ^{4OT}	14–3 (1–1)	Alex G. Spanos Center (2,577); Stockton, CA
January 9, 2020; 8:00 pm, ESPN2		BYU	W 87–84 ^{OT}	15–3 (2–1)	University Credit Union Pavilion (3,500); Moraga, CA
January 11, 2020; 5:00 pm, ESPNU		Santa Clara	L 66–67	15–4 (2–2)	University Credit Union Pavilion (3,500); Moraga, CA
January 18, 2020; 1:00 pm, CBSSN		at Pepperdine	W 78–69	16–4 (3–2)	Firestone Fieldhouse (1,219); Malibu, CA
January 23, 2020; 7:30 pm, CBSSN		San Francisco	W 58–48	17–4 (4–2)	University Credit Union Pavilion (3,422); Moraga, CA
January 25, 2020; 6:00 pm, Stadium		at Loyola Marymount	W 73–62	18–4 (5–2)	Gersten Pavilion (1,437); Los Angeles, CA
January 30, 2020; 7:00 pm, Stadium		Portland	W 86–64	19–4 (6–2)	University Credit Union Pavilion (3,009); Moraga, CA
February 1, 2020; 7:00 pm, ESPN2		at BYU	L 79–81	19–5 (6–3)	Marriott Center (15,212); Provo, UT
February 6, 2020; 8:00 pm, ESPNU		at San Diego	W 66–60	20–5 (7–3)	Jenny Craig Pavilion (1,713); San Diego, CA
February 8, 2020; 7:00 pm, ESPN		No. 2 Gonzaga; Rivalry	L 60–90	20–6 (7–4)	University Credit Union Pavilion (3,500); Moraga, CA
February 15, 2020; 5:00 pm, Stadium		Pacific	W 71–63	21–6 (8–4)	University Credit Union Pavilion (3,500); Moraga, CA
February 20, 2020; 8:00 pm, CBSSN		Loyola Marymount	W 57–51	22–6 (9–4)	University Credit Union Pavilion (3,500); Moraga, CA
February 22, 2020; 5:00 pm, Stadium		San Diego	W 92–63	23–6 (10–4)	University Credit Union Pavilion (3,500); Moraga, CA
February 27, 2020; 7:00 pm, CBSSN		at Santa Clara	W 78–72	24–6 (11–4)	Leavey Center (2,512); Santa Clara, CA
February 29, 2020; 7:00 pm, ESPN2		at No. 3 Gonzaga; Rivalry	L 76–86	24–7 (11–5)	McCarthey Athletic Center (6,000); Spokane, WA
WCC tournament
March 7, 2020; 9:00 pm, ESPN2	(3)	vs. (6) Pepperdine; Third round	W 89–82	25–7	Orleans Arena (4,350); Paradise, NV
March 9, 2020; 8:30 pm, ESPN2	(3)	vs. (2) No. 14 BYU; Semifinals	W 51–50	26–7	Orleans Arena (7,471); Paradise, NV
March 9, 2020; 6:00 pm, ESPN	(3)	vs. (1) No. 2 Gonzaga; Championship	L 66–84	26–8	Orleans Arena (7,471); Paradise, NV
*Non-conference game. ^{#}Rankings from AP Poll. (#) Tournament seedings in parentheses. All times are in Pacific Time.

== Rankings ==
Ranking movements Legend: ██ Increase in ranking ██ Decrease in ranking — = Not ranked RV = Received votes
	Week																			
Poll	Pre	1	2	3	4	5	6	7	8	9	10	11	12	13	14	15	16	17	18	Final
AP*	20	18	RV	RV	RV	RV	RV	RV	RV	RV	RV	—	RV	—	—	RV	—	RV	RV	RV
Coaches	20	20	RV	RV	RV	RV	RV	RV	RV	—	RV	RV	RV	RV	RV	RV	RV	RV	RV	RV

*AP does not release post-NCAA Tournament rankings
