= 2019–20 Pacific Tigers men's basketball team =

American college basketball season

2019–20 Pacific Tigers men's basketball
- Conference: West Coast Conference
- Record: 23–10 (11–5 WCC)
- Head coach: Damon Stoudamire (4th season)
- Assistant coaches: Leonard Perry; Luke Wicks; JayDee Luster
- Home arena: Alex G. Spanos Center

2019–20 West Coast Conference men's basketball standings
	Conf.				Overall
Team	W		L	PCT	W		L	PCT
No. 2 Gonzaga †	15	–	1	.938	31	–	2	.939
No. 14 BYU	13	–	3	.813	24	–	8	.750
Saint Mary's	11	–	5	.688	26	–	8	.765
Pacific	11	–	5	.688	23	–	10	.697
San Francisco	9	–	7	.563	22	–	12	.647
Pepperdine	8	–	8	.500	16	–	16	.500
Santa Clara	6	–	10	.375	20	–	13	.606
Loyola Marymount	4	–	12	.250	11	–	21	.344
San Diego	2	–	14	.125	9	–	23	.281
Portland	1	–	15	.063	9	–	23	.281
† 2020 WCC tournament winner Rankings from AP poll

The 2019–20 Pacific Tigers men's basketball team represented the University of the Pacific during the 2019–20 NCAA Division I men's basketball season. The Tigers were led by fourth-year head coach Damon Stoudamire and played their home games at the Alex G. Spanos Center in Stockton, California as members of the West Coast Conference. They finished the season 23–10, 11–5 in WCC play to finish in a tie for third place. They lost in the third round of the WCC tournament to San Francisco.

== Previous season ==
The Tigers finished the 2018–19 season 14–18, 4–12 in WCC play to finish in ninth place. They lost in the first round of the WCC tournament to Pepperdine.

== Offseason ==
=== Departures ===
Name	Number	Pos.	Height	Weight	Year	Hometown	Reason for departure
Lafayette Dorsey	1	G	6'1"	170	Sophomore	Los Angeles, CA	Transferred to Nicholls State
Roberto Gallinat	4	G	6'3"	180	Senior	Atlanta, GA	Graduated
Anthony Townes	5	F	6'6"	215	Senior	Modesto, CA	Graduated
Khy Kabellis	11	G	6'5"	185	RS Junior	Escondido, CA	Graduate transferred to UC Riverside
Ajare Sanni	14	G	6'2"	158	Freshman	Houston, TX	Transferred to UC Santa Barbara
Namdi Okonkwo	24	C	7'0"	220	RS Senior	Dallas, TX	Graduated
Kendall Small	25	G	6'0"	182	RS Junior	Lakewood, CA	Graduate transferred to Chaminade
Zach Cameron	35	F/C	6'10"	207	Junior	Sacramento, CA	Left the team for personal reasons

=== Incoming transfers ===
Name	Number	Pos.	Height	Weight	Year	Hometown	Previous School
Austin Vereen	1	G	6'4"	190	RS Senior	Washington, D.C.	Transferred from VMI. Will be eligible to play immediately since Vereen graduated from VMI.
Gary Chivichyan	11	G	6'4"	200	RS Senior	Los Angeles, CA	Transferred from Idaho State. Will be eligible to play immediately since Chivichyan graduated from Idaho State.
Broc Finstuen	24	G	6'4"	205	Junior	Pine Island, MN	Junior college transferred from Casper College
James Hampshire	33	C	7'1"	255	Sophomore	Mesa, AZ	Junior college transferred from Casper College
Shaquillo Fritz	35	F	6'8"	210	RS Senior	Freeport, Bahamas	Transferred from Arkansas State. Will be eligible to play immediately since Fritz graduated from Arkansas State.

=== Recruiting Class of 2019 ===
College recruiting information
Name	Hometown	School	Height	Weight	Commit date
Jonathan Salazar #37 PF	Bellflower, CA	St. John Bosco High School	6 ft 6 in (1.98 m)	235 lb (107 kg)	Aug 14, 2018
Jonathan Salazar #37 PF	Recruit ratings: Scout: Rivals: (78)				
Pierre Crockrell; PG	Tacoma, WA	Prolific Prep	5 ft 11 in (1.80 m)	160 lb (73 kg)	Jun 8, 2019
Pierre Crockrell; PG	Recruit ratings: Scout: Rivals: (NR)				
Daniss Jenkins; PG	Dallas, TX	Hillcrest High School	6 ft 3 in (1.91 m)	N/A	
Daniss Jenkins; PG	Recruit ratings: Scout: Rivals: (NR)				
Overall recruit ranking: Scout: 98 Rivals: nr ESPN: nr
Note: In many cases, Scout, Rivals, 247Sports, On3, and ESPN may conflict in their listings of height and weight.; In these cases, the average was taken. ESPN grades are on a 100-point scale.; Sources: "Pacific 2019 Basketball Commitments". Rivals.; "2019 Pacific Basketball Commits". Scout.; "ESPN". ESPN.; "Scout.com Team Recruiting Rankings". Scout.; "2019 Team Ranking". Rivals.

== Roster ==
2019–20 Pacific Tigers men's basketball team
Players
Coaches

Pos.	#	Name	Height	Weight	Year	Previous school	Hometown
F	0	Jahlil Tripp	6 ft 5 in (1.96 m)	220 lb (100 kg)	Sr	Abraham Lincoln; South Plains College	Brooklyn, NY
G	1	Austin Vereen	6 ft 4 in (1.93 m)	210 lb (95 kg)	RS Sr	Maret School; VMI	Washington, D.C.
C	2	Amari McCray	6 ft 9 in (2.06 m)	265 lb (120 kg)	Sr	Ruston; Howard College	Ruston, LA
G	3	Pierre Crockrell	6 ft 0 in (1.83 m)	175 lb (79 kg)	Fr	Prolific Prep	Tacoma, WA
G	4	Daniss Jenkins	6 ft 3 in (1.91 m)	165 lb (75 kg)	Fr	Hillcrest	Dallas, TX
F	10	Jonathan Salazar	6 ft 6 in (1.98 m)	250 lb (113 kg)	Fr	St. John Bosco	Panama
G	11	Gary Chivichyan	6 ft 4 in (1.93 m)	200 lb (91 kg)	RS Sr	Middlebrooks Academy; Idaho State	Los Angeles, CA
F	13	Jeremiah Bailey	6 ft 6 in (1.98 m)	203 lb (92 kg)	So	Monroe Catholic; Pima College	Fairbanks, AK
G	20	Jade Brahmbhatt (W)	5 ft 11 in (1.8 m)	167 lb (76 kg)	So	Bethesda-Chevy Chase	Olney, MD
G	22	Jahbril Price-Noel	6 ft 7 in (2.01 m)	202 lb (92 kg)	So	Southwest Christian Academy	Scarborough, ON
G	24	Broc Finstuen	6 ft 4 in (1.93 m)	200 lb (91 kg)	Jr	Pine Island; Casper College	Pine Island, MN
G	25	Justin Moore	6 ft 4 in (1.93 m)	175 lb (79 kg)	RS Jr	Mission Bay; Georgia Tech	San Diego, CA
F	30	Takori Rooks (W)	6 ft 5 in (1.96 m)	215 lb (98 kg)	Fr	Bartlett	Memphis, TN
C	33	James Hampshire	7 ft 1 in (2.16 m)	242 lb (110 kg)	RS Jr	Coconino; Casper College	Flagstaff, AZ
F/C	35	Shaquillo Fritz	6 ft 8 in (2.03 m)	225 lb (102 kg)	RS Sr	IMG Academy; Arkansas State	Freeport, Bahamas

Head coach

- Damon Stoudamire (Arizona)

Assistant coach(es)

- Leonard Perry (Idaho)
- Luke Wicks (Northern State)
- JayDee Luster (Wyoming)

Legend

- (C) Team captain
- (S) Suspended
- (I) Ineligible
- (W) Walk-on
- Injured
- Current redshirt

Roster

== Schedule and results ==
Date time, TV	Rank^{#}	Opponent^{#}	Result	Record	High points	High rebounds	High assists	Site (attendance) city, state
Non-conference regular season
November 5, 2019*; 7:00 pm		Stanislaus State	W 69–47	1–0	14 – McCray	8 – Tied	3 – Moore	Alex G. Spanos Center (2,802); Stockton, CA
November 8, 2019*; 6:30 pm		vs. South Dakota; Rainbow Classic	L 62–72	1–1	16 – Moore	7 – Tripp	5 – Moore	Stan Sheriff Center (5,203); Honolulu, HI
November 10, 2019*; 4:30 pm		vs. Florida A&M; Rainbow Classic	W 76–54	2–1	12 – McCray	8 – Tripp	5 – Crockrell II	Stan Sheriff Center (5,200); Honolulu, HI
November 11, 2019*; 9:00 pm		at Hawaii; Rainbow Classic	L 67–72	2–2	16 – McCray	5 – Tripp	5 – Moore	Stan Sheriff Center (4,935); Honolulu, HI
November 14, 2019*; 7:00 pm		Pacific Union	W 86–48	3–2	12 – McCray	10 – Fritz	4 – Crockrell II	Alex G. Spanos Center (1,279); Stockton, CA
November 17, 2019*; 3:00 pm		UC Riverside; College Hoops Roadshow	W 58–51	4–2	17 – Tripp	7 – Tripp	7 – Moore	Alex G. Spanos Center (1,243); Stockton, CA
November 19, 2019*; 7:00 pm		Coppin State; College Hoops Roadshow	W 64–60	5–2	21 – Tripp	13 – Tripp	4 – Moore	Alex G. Spanos Center (1,309); Stockton, CA
November 23, 2019*; 4:00 pm		Boise State	L 76–82 ^{3OT}	5–3	22 – Tripp	13 – Hampshire	2 – 3 tied	Alex G. Spanos Center (1,859); Stockton, CA
November 26, 2019*; 7:00 pm		SIU Edwardsville; College Hoops Roadshow	W 78–50	6–3	13 – Tripp	6 – Fritz	7 – Crockrell II	Alex G. Spanos Center (1,102); Stockton, CA
November 29, 2019*; 7:00 pm		Longwood; College Hoops Roadshow	W 69–51	7–3	17 – Chivichyan	9 – Fritz	6 – Cockrell II	Alex G. Spanos Center (1,858); Stockton, CA
December 4, 2019*; 7:00 pm		Cal State Fullerton	W 62–59	8–3	16 – Tied	10 – Tripp	3 – Crockrell II	Alex G. Spanos Center (1,534); Stockton, CA
December 7, 2019*; 7:00 pm		at Long Beach State	W 65–46	9–3	15 – Tripp	8 – Tripp	4 – Tied	Walter Pyramid (2,695); Long Beach, CA
December 15, 2019*; 3:00 pm		Cal State Northridge	W 79–73	10–3	17 – Tripp	8 – Tripp	8 – Crockrell II	Alex G. Spanos Center (1,284); Stockton, CA
December 18, 2019*; 7:00 pm		at UNLV	W 74–66	11–3	22 – Moore	8 – Tripp	4 – Tied	Thomas & Mack Center (7,023); Paradise, NV
December 21, 2019*; 7:00 pm		Idaho State	W 77–66	12–3	21 – Tripp	13 – Tripp	5 – Moore	Alex G. Spanos Center (1,629); Stockton, CA
December 28, 2019*; 7:00 pm		at UC Irvine	L 56–69	12–4	14 – Tied	15 – Tripp	3 – Tied	Bren Events Center (1,855); Irvine, CA
WCC regular season
January 2, 2020; 7:00 pm		at Pepperdine	W 59–56	13–4 (1–0)	19 – Chivichyan	9 – Tripp	7 – Crockrell II	Firestone Fieldhouse (1,015); Malibu, CA
January 4, 2020; 7:00 pm, Stadium		Saint Mary's	W 107–99 ^{4OT}	14–4 (2–0)	39 – Tripp	11 – Tripp	3 – Tripp	Alex G. Spanos Center (2,577); Stockton, CA
January 11, 2020; 4:00 pm, NBCSBA		San Francisco	L 75–79	14–5 (2–1)	20 – Price-Noel	8 – Tied	6 – Crockrell II	Alex G. Spanos Center (2,382); Stockton, CA
January 16, 2020; 7:00 pm		at Portland	W 65–55	15–5 (3–1)	16 – Jankins	14 – Tripp	7 – Tripp	Chiles Center (1,426); Portland, OR
January 18, 2020; 6:00 pm		at Santa Clara	L 80–84	15–6 (3–2)	28 – Tripp	6 – Tied	4 – Tripp	Leavey Center (1,760); Santa Clara, CA
January 23, 2020; 7:00 pm		BYU	L 60–74	15–7 (3–3)	18 – Tripp	10 – Tripp	3 – Moore	Alex G. Spanos Center (3,097); Stockton, CA
January 25, 2020; 7:00 pm		at No. 2 Gonzaga	L 59–92	15–8 (3–4)	21 – Tripp	5 – Tied	4 – Tripp	McCarthey Athletic Center (6,000); Spokane, WA
January 30, 2020; 7:00 pm		Loyola Marymount	W 62–50	16–8 (4–4)	16 – Jenkins	6 – Tripp	4 – Jenkins	Alex G. Spanos Center (2,291); Stockton, CA
February 1, 2020; 7:00 pm		San Diego	W 66–58	17–8 (5–4)	11 – Finstuen	11 – McCray	2 – Tied	Alex G. Spanos Center; Stockton, CA
February 6, 2020; 8:00 pm		at San Francisco	W 60–48	18–8 (6–4)	12 – Cockrell II	20 – Tripp	2 – Tied	War Memorial Gymnasium (1,748); San Francisco, CA
February 8, 2020; 7:00 pm		Pepperdine	W 79–78	19–8 (7–4)	24 – Tripp	15 – Tripp	4 – Jenkins	Alex G. Spanos Center (2,707); Stockton, CA
February 13, 2020; 7:00 pm		Portland	W 75–55	20–8 (8–4)	18 – Tripp	12 – Tripp	10 – Crockrell II	Alex G. Spanos Center (1,785); Stockton, CA
February 15, 2020; 5:00 pm, Stadium		at Saint Mary's	L 63–71	20–9 (8–5)	17 – Tripp	7 – Tripp	2 – 3 tied	University Credit Union Pavilion (3,500); Moraga, CA
February 22, 2020; 7:00 pm		Santa Clara	W 87–74	21–9 (9–5)	29 – Tripp	7 – Hampshire	5 – Tripp	Alex G. Spanos Center (3,043); Stockton, CA
February 27, 2020; 7:00 pm		at Loyola Marymount	W 60–53	22–9 (10–5)	19 – McCroy	8 – McCroy	4 – Crockrell II	Gersten Pavilion (946); Los Angeles, CA
February 29, 2020; 7:00 pm		at San Diego	W 71–64	23–9 (11–5)	22 – Tripp	12 – Tripp	3 – Tripp	Jenny Craig Pavilion (1,419); San Diego, CA
WCC tournament
March 7, 2020; 7:00 pm, ESPN2	(4)	vs. (5) San Francisco; Third round	L 54–72	23–10	29 – Tripp	14 – Tripp	3 – Tripp	Orleans Arena (4,350); Paradise, NV
*Non-conference game. ^{#}Rankings from AP Poll. (#) Tournament seedings in parentheses. All times are in Pacific Time.
