= Pavel Zakharov =

Russian basketball player (born 2001)

No. 5 – BC Nizhny Novgorod
- Position: Center
- League: VTB United League

Personal information
- Born: 3 May 2001 (age 25) Sør-Varanger, Norway
- Listed height: 2.12 m (6 ft 11 in)
- Listed weight: 99 kg (218 lb)

Career information
- High school: Montverde Academy (Montverde, Florida)
- College: Gonzaga (2019–2021); California Baptist (2021–2022)
- NBA draft: 2023: undrafted
- Playing career: 2023–present

Career history
- 2023–2024: CSKA Moscow
- 2024–present: Nizhny Novgorod

Pavel Zakharov (Russian: Павел Захаров; born 3 May 2001) is a Russian professional basketball player for Nizhny Novgorod of the VTB United League. He played college basketball for the Gonzaga Bulldogs and California Baptist Lancers.

== Early life and career ==
Zakharov was born in Sør-Varanger Municipality in Finnmark county, Norway, and spoke Norwegian as a child. In June 2017, he attended the adidas EuroCamp in Treviso, Italy. In the 2017–18 season, Zakharov played for the junior team of Russian club Zenit Saint Petersburg in the VTB United Youth League. In 21 games, he averaged 10.4 points and 3.5 rebounds per game. In January 2018, Zakharov joined the CSKA Moscow junior team at Kaunas qualifiers for the Adidas Next Generation Tournament.

In the 2018–19 season, he played basketball for Montverde Academy, a prep school in Montverde, Florida with a prestigious basketball program. In November 2018, Zakharov drew attention as one of the best prospects at the National Prep Showcase in New Haven, Connecticut. During 2019 NBA All-Star Weekend, he attended the Basketball Without Borders camp.

=== Recruiting ===
Zakharov was considered a consensus four-star recruit and ranked among the top 50 players in the 2019 recruiting class by 247Sports and Rivals. On 19 November 2018, he committed to play college basketball for Gonzaga.

College recruiting
Name	Hometown	School	Height	Weight	Commit date
Pavel Zakharov; C	Saint Petersburg, Russia	Montverde Academy (FL)	6 ft 10 in (2.08 m)	235 lb (107 kg)	Nov 19, 2018
Pavel Zakharov; C	Recruit ratings: Rivals: 247Sports: ESPN: (83)				
Overall recruit ranking: Rivals: 46 247Sports: 47 ESPN: 92
Note: In many cases, Scout, Rivals, 247Sports, On3, and ESPN may conflict in their listings of height and weight.; In these cases, the average was taken. ESPN grades are on a 100-point scale.; Sources: "Gonzaga 2019 Basketball Commitments". Rivals.; "2019 Gonzaga Bulldogs Recruiting Class". ESPN.; "2019 Team Ranking". Rivals.

== College career ==
Zakharov played sparingly during his two years at Gonzaga. After his sophomore season, he transferred to California Baptist.

== National team career ==
Zakharov played for Russia at the 2017 FIBA U16 European Championship in Podgorica, Montenegro. In seven games, he averaged 8.4 points and 6.6 rebounds per game. He returned to national team duty at the 2018 FIBA U18 European Championship in Latvia, where he averaged 7.3 points and five rebounds per game over seven appearances.

== Career statistics ==
Legend
GP	Games played	GS	Games started	MPG	Minutes per game
FG%	Field goal percentage	3P%	3-point field goal percentage	FT%	Free throw percentage
RPG	Rebounds per game	APG	Assists per game	SPG	Steals per game
BPG	Blocks per game	PPG	Points per game	**Bold**	Career high

=== College ===
Year	Team	GP	GS	MPG	FG%	3P%	FT%	RPG	APG	SPG	BPG	PPG
2019–20	Gonzaga	**19**	**0**	4.5	**.619**	**.500**	**.600**	.9	.2	.1	.2	**1.9**
2020–21	Gonzaga	10	**0**	2.8	.333	**.500**	.500	.4	0	0	0	.8
2021–22	California Baptist	4	**0**	**10.0**	.143	.000	**.600**	**1.5**	**.3**	**.3**	**1.0**	1.3
Career		33	0	4.6	.459	.333	.591	.8	.1	.1	.2	1.5
