= 2019–20 Gonzaga Bulldogs men's basketball team =

American college basketball season

2019–20 Gonzaga Bulldogs men's basketball

WCC regular season and tournament champions
- Conference: West Coast Conference

Ranking
- Coaches: No. 2
- AP: No. 2
- Record: 31–2 (15–1 WCC)
- Head coach: Mark Few (21st season)
- Assistant coaches: Tommy Lloyd (19th season); Brian Michaelson (7th season); Roger Powell Jr. (1st season)
- Home arena: McCarthey Athletic Center

2019–20 West Coast Conference men's basketball standings
	Conf.				Overall
Team	W		L	PCT	W		L	PCT
No. 2 Gonzaga †	15	–	1	.938	31	–	2	.939
No. 14 BYU	13	–	3	.813	24	–	8	.750
Saint Mary's	11	–	5	.688	26	–	8	.765
Pacific	11	–	5	.688	23	–	10	.697
San Francisco	9	–	7	.563	22	–	12	.647
Pepperdine	8	–	8	.500	16	–	16	.500
Santa Clara	6	–	10	.375	20	–	13	.606
Loyola Marymount	4	–	12	.250	11	–	21	.344
San Diego	2	–	14	.125	9	–	23	.281
Portland	1	–	15	.063	9	–	23	.281
† 2020 WCC tournament winner Rankings from AP poll

The 2019–20 Gonzaga Bulldogs men's basketball team (also informally referred to as the Zags) represented Gonzaga University, located in Spokane, Washington, in the 2019–20 NCAA Division I men's basketball season. The team was led by head coach Mark Few, in his 21st season as head coach. This was the Bulldogs' 16th season at the on-campus McCarthey Athletic Center and 40th season as a member of the West Coast Conference. They finished the season 31–2, 15–1 in WCC play to be WCC regular season champions. They defeated San Francisco and Saint Mary's to be champions of the WCC tournament. They earned the WCC's automatic bid to the NCAA tournament. However, all postseason play, including the NCAA Tournament, was cancelled amid the COVID-19 pandemic, making this season the only one under Mark Few that they did not play in the NCAA Tournament.

== Previous season ==
The Bulldogs team finished the 2018–19 season 33–4, 16–0 in WCC play to win the WCC regular season championship. After losing to Saint Mary's in the WCC tournament, they received an at-large bid to the NCAA tournament, where they defeated Fairleigh Dickinson in the Round of 64, Baylor in the Round of 32, and then Florida State in the Sweet Sixteen, before losing to Texas Tech in the Elite Eight.

== Offseason ==
=== Coaching changes ===
==== Departures ====
Name	Position	Year at Gonzaga	Alma mater (year)	Reason for departure
Donny Daniels	Assistant coach	9th	Cal State Fullerton (1976)	Director of player development at Utah
Riccardo Fois	Coordinator of analytics & video operations	5th	Pepperdine (2009)	Player Development Coach at Phoenix Suns
Stephen Gentry	Director of basketball operations	2nd	Gonzaga (2006)	Assistant coach at Illinois

==== Additions to staff ====
Name	Position	Year at Gonzaga	Alma mater (year)	Previous job
Jorge Sanz	Director of basketball operations	2nd	Florida Atlantic (2011)	Graduate assistant at Gonzaga
Roger Powell Jr.	Assistant coach	1st	Illinois (2005)	Assistant coach at Vanderbilt
Gary Bell Jr.	Graduate assistant	1st	Gonzaga (2015)	Pro basketball player at Aris Thessaloniki

=== Player departures ===
Name	Number	Pos.	Height	Weight	Year	Hometown	Reason for departure
Jeremy Jones	22	F	6'7"	213	Senior (redshirt)	San Antonio, TX	Graduated
Josh Perkins	13	G	6'3"	190	Senior (redshirt)	Park Hill, CO	Graduated
Geno Crandall	0	G	6'4"	185	Senior (redshirt)	Minneapolis, MN	Graduated
Brandon Clarke	15	F	6'8"	215	Junior (redshirt)	Phoenix, AZ	Declared for 2019 NBA draft; selected 21st overall by the Oklahoma City Thunder
Jack Beach	2	G	6'3"	180	Junior (redshirt)	San Diego, CA	Graduated
Alex Martin	5	G	6'5"	205	Junior (redshirt)	Overland Park, KS	Left team
Rui Hachimura	21	F	6'8"	230	Junior	Toyama, Japan	Declared for 2019 NBA draft; selected 9th overall by the Washington Wizards
Zach Norvell	23	G	6'5"	205	Sophomore (redshirt)	Chicago, IL	Declared for 2019 NBA draft; undrafted
Greg Foster	4	G	6'5"	195	Freshman	Milwaukee, WI	Transferred to Saint Joseph's
Paul Pennington	20	G	5'10"	160	Freshman	Boise, ID	Transferred to San Diego

=== Incoming transfers ===
Name	Number	Pos.	Height	Weight	Year	Hometown	Previous school	Years remaining	Date eligible
Admon Gilder	1	G	6'4"	200	Senior (redshirt)	Dallas, TX	Texas A&M	1	Oct. 1, 2019
Ryan Woolridge	4	G	6'3"	175	Senior (redshirt)	Mansfield, TX	North Texas	1	Oct. 1, 2019
Will Graves	35	G	6'5"	180	Sophomore	Eugene, OR	Lane CC	3	Oct. 1, 2019

=== Left program before playing ===
Name	Number	Pos.	Height	Weight	Year	Hometown	Previous School
Brock Ravet	32	G	6'1"	175	Freshman	Kittitas, WA	Kittitas

=== 2019 recruiting class ===
College recruiting
Name	Hometown	School	Height	Weight	Commit date
Anton Watson #11 SF	Spokane, WA	Gonzaga Prep	6 ft 8 in (2.03 m)	220 lb (100 kg)	Jun 21, 2017
Anton Watson #11 SF	Recruit ratings: Rivals: 247Sports: ESPN:				
Brock Ravet #17 SG	Kittitas, WA	Kittitas	6 ft 1 in (1.85 m)	175 lb (79 kg)	Jun 23, 2017
Brock Ravet #17 SG	Recruit ratings: Rivals: 247Sports: ESPN:				
Martynas Arlauskas #13 SF	Kaunas, Lithuania	President Valdas Adamkus Gymnasium	6 ft 6 in (1.98 m)	200 lb (91 kg)	Sep 20, 2018
Martynas Arlauskas #13 SF	Recruit ratings: Rivals: 247Sports: ESPN:				
Drew Timme #14 C	Richardson, TX	Pearce	6 ft 10 in (2.08 m)	235 lb (107 kg)	Nov 14, 2018
Drew Timme #14 C	Recruit ratings: Rivals: 247Sports: ESPN:				
Pavel Zakharov #10 C	St. Petersburg, Russia	Montverde Academy	6 ft 11 in (2.11 m)	235 lb (107 kg)	Nov 19, 2018
Pavel Zakharov #10 C	Recruit ratings: Rivals: 247Sports: ESPN:				
Oumar Ballo #16 C	Koulikoro, Mali	NBA Academy Latin America	6 ft 10 in (2.08 m)	260 lb (120 kg)	Feb 23, 2019
Oumar Ballo #16 C	Recruit ratings: Rivals: 247Sports: ESPN:				
Overall recruit ranking:
Note: In many cases, Scout, Rivals, 247Sports, On3, and ESPN may conflict in their listings of height and weight.; In these cases, the average was taken. ESPN grades are on a 100-point scale.; Sources: "Gonzaga Commit List for 2019". Rivals.; "2019 Team Ranking". Rivals.

== Roster ==
2019–20 Gonzaga Bulldogs men's basketball team
Players
Coaches

Pos.	#	Name	Height	Weight	Year	Previous school	Hometown
G	1	Admon Gilder	6 ft 4 in (1.93 m)	200 lb (91 kg)	RS Sr	Madison; Texas A&M	Dallas, TX
G	4	Ryan Woolridge	6 ft 3 in (1.91 m)	175 lb (79 kg)	RS Sr	Lake Ridge; San Diego; North Texas	Mansfield, TX
F	33	Killian Tillie	6 ft 10 in (2.08 m)	220 lb (100 kg)	Sr	INSEP	Cagnes-sur-Mer, France
F	24	Corey Kispert	6 ft 7 in (2.01 m)	220 lb (100 kg)	Jr	King's	Edmonds, WA
G	11	Joël Ayayi	6 ft 5 in (1.96 m)	180 lb (82 kg)	RS So	INSEP	Bordeaux, France
F	3	Filip Petrušev	6 ft 11 in (2.11 m)	235 lb (107 kg)	So	Montverde Academy	Belgrade, Serbia
G	23	Matthew Lang	6 ft 3 in (1.91 m)	185 lb (84 kg)	So	Jesuit	Portland, OR
G	35	Will Graves (W)	6 ft 5 in (1.96 m)	180 lb (82 kg)	So	South Eugene; Lane CC	Eugene, OR
F	22	Anton Watson	6 ft 8 in (2.03 m)	220 lb (100 kg)	Fr	Gonzaga Prep	Spokane, WA
G	32	Brock Ravet (L)	6 ft 1 in (1.85 m)	175 lb (79 kg)	Fr	Kittitas	Kittitas, WA
G	5	Martynas Arlauskas	6 ft 6 in (1.98 m)	200 lb (91 kg)	Fr	President Valdas Adamkus Gymnasium	Kaunas, Lithuania
F	2	Drew Timme	6 ft 10 in (2.08 m)	235 lb (107 kg)	Fr	Pearce	Richardson, TX
F	10	Pavel Zakharov	6 ft 11 in (2.11 m)	235 lb (107 kg)	Fr	Montverde Academy	Saint Petersburg, Russia
C	21	Oumar Ballo (I) (redshirt)	6 ft 10 in (2.08 m)	260 lb (118 kg)	Fr	NBA Academy Latin America	Koulikoro, Mali

Head coach

- Mark Few (Oregon)

Assistant coach(es)

- Tommy Lloyd (Whitman)
- Brian Michaelson (Gonzaga)
- Roger Powell Jr. (Illinois)

Legend

- (C) Team captain
- (S) Suspended
- (I) Ineligible
- (W) Walk-on
- (L) Left team
- Injured
- Current redshirt

Roster
Last update: February 2, 2020

- Roster is subject to change as/if players transfer or leave the program for other reasons.
- Oumar Ballo was ruled as an academic redshirt prior to the start of the 2019–20 season. He had four years of eligibility remaining at the start of the 2020–21 season.
- Brock Ravet left the team due to personal reasons before the 2019–20 regular season began.
- Matthew Lang was awarded a basketball scholarship for the second semester of the 2019–20 season.

=== Coaching staff ===
Name	Position	Year at Gonzaga	Alma mater (year)
Mark Few	Head coach	21st	Oregon (1987)
Tommy Lloyd	Associate head coach	19th	Whitman (1998)
Brian Michaelson	Assistant coach	7th	Gonzaga (2005)
Roger Powell Jr.	Assistant coach	1st	Illinois (2005)
Jorge Sanz	Director of basketball operations	2nd	Florida Atlantic (2011)
Gary Bell	Graduate assistant	1st	Gonzaga (2015)
Ken Nakagawa	Video coordinator	4th	Long Beach State (2014)
Josh Therrien	Athletic trainer	4th	Washington State (2007)
Travis Knight	Strength and conditioning coach	14th	Gonzaga (2000)

== Schedule and results ==
Date time, TV	Rank^{#}	Opponent^{#}	Result	Record	High points	High rebounds	High assists	Site (attendance) city, state
Exhibition
November 1, 2019*; 6:00 pm, KHQ	No. 8	Lewis–Clark State	W 116–61	–	28 – Watson	9 – Tied	5 – Tied	McCarthey Athletic Center (6,000); Spokane, WA
Non-conference regular season
November 5, 2019*; 5:00 pm, KHQ/RTNW	No. 8	Alabama State	W 95–64	1–0	28 – Kispert	7 – Ayayi	7 – Ayayi	McCarthey Athletic Center (6,000); Spokane, WA
November 9, 2019*; 5:00 pm, KHQ/RTNW	No. 8	Arkansas–Pine Bluff	W 110–60	2–0	25 – Petrušev	13 – Ayayi	9 – Woolridge	McCarthey Athletic Center (6,000); Spokane, WA
November 12, 2019*; 6:00 pm, KHQ/RTNW	No. 8	North Dakota	W 97–66	3–0	20 – Kispert	15 – Petrušev	5 – Kispert	McCarthey Athletic Center (6,000); Spokane, WA
November 15, 2019*; 6:00 pm, SECN	No. 8	at Texas A&M	W 79–49	4–0	16 – Tied	10 – Petrušev	6 – Ayayi	Reed Arena (10,344); College Station, TX
November 19, 2019*; 6:00 pm, KHQ/RTNW	No. 8	UT Arlington; Battle 4 Atlantis campus-site game	W 72–66	5–0	19 – Woolridge	10 – Timme	5 – Gilder	McCarthey Athletic Center (6,000); Spokane, WA
November 23, 2019*; 5:00 pm, KHQ/RTNW	No. 8	Cal State Bakersfield	W 77–49	6–0	15 – Petrušev	7 – Petrušev	4 – Petrušev	McCarthey Athletic Center (6,000); Spokane, WA
November 27, 2019*; 4:00 pm, ESPNU	No. 8	vs. Southern Miss; Battle 4 Atlantis quarterfinals	W 94–69	7–0	28 – Kispert	12 – Ayayi	7 – Woolridge	Imperial Arena (1,459); Nassau, BS
November 28, 2019*; 1:00 pm, ESPN	No. 8	vs. No. 11 Oregon; Battle 4 Atlantis semifinals	W 73–72 ^{OT}	8–0	22 – Petrušev	15 – Petrušev	3 – Ayayi	Imperial Arena (1,432); Nassau, BS
November 29, 2019*; 11:00 am, ESPN	No. 8	vs. Michigan; Battle 4 Atlantis championship	L 64–82	8–1	20 – Tillie	9 – Petrušev	5 – Woolridge	Imperial Arena (1,503); Nassau, BS
December 4, 2019*; 6:00 pm, KHQ/RTNW	No. 9	Texas Southern	W 101–62	9–1	17 – Kispert	9 – Ayayi	5 – Tied	McCarthey Athletic Center (6,000); Spokane, WA
December 8, 2019*; 4:00 pm, ESPN2	No. 9	at No. 22 Washington; Rivalry	W 83–76	10–1	17 – Petrušev	10 – Petrušev	6 – Tillie	Alaska Airlines Arena (9,268); Seattle, WA
December 14, 2019*; 7:00 pm, ESPN2	No. 6	at No. 15 Arizona	W 84–80	11–1	18 – Kispert	8 – Kispert	7 – Ayayi	McKale Center (14,644); Tucson, AZ
December 18, 2019*; 6:00 pm, ESPN2	No. 2	North Carolina	W 94–81	12–1	26 – Kispert	10 – Ayayi	9 – Woolridge	McCarthey Athletic Center (6,000); Spokane, WA
December 21, 2019*; 2:00 pm, KHQ/RTNW	No. 2	Eastern Washington	W 112–77	13–1	24 – Petrušev	9 – Tied	5 – Woolridge	McCarthey Athletic Center (6,000); Spokane, WA
December 30, 2019*; 6:00 pm, KHQ/RTNW	No. 1	Detroit Mercy	W 93–72	14–1	22 – Petrušev	7 – Timme	8 – Woolridge	McCarthey Athletic Center (6,000); Spokane, WA
WCC regular season
January 2, 2020; 7:00 pm, KHQ/RTNW	No. 1	at Portland	W 85–72	15–1 (1–0)	22 – Tillie	8 – Petrušev	4 – Tied	Chiles Center (4,633); Portland, OR
January 4, 2020; 7:00 pm, ESPN2	No. 1	Pepperdine	W 75–70	16–1 (2–0)	20 – Tillie	10 – Petrušev	4 – Tied	McCarthey Athletic Center (6,000); Spokane, WA
January 9, 2020; 7:00 pm, KHQ/RTNW	No. 1	at San Diego	W 94–50	17–1 (3–0)	20 – Ayayi	10 – Tillie	6 – Woolridge	Jenny Craig Pavilion (4,549); San Diego, CA
January 11, 2020; 1:00 pm, KAYU/RTNW	No. 1	at Loyola Marymount	W 87–62	18–1 (4–0)	16 – Petrušev	11 – Timme	5 – Woolridge	Gersten Pavilion (3,534); Los Angeles, CA
January 16, 2020; 8:00 pm, ESPN2	No. 1	Santa Clara	W 104–54	19–1 (5–0)	19 – Ayayi	11 – Timme	5 – Woolridge	McCarthey Athletic Center (6,000); Spokane, WA
January 18, 2020; 7:00 pm, ESPN2	No. 1	BYU; Rivalry	W 92–69	20–1 (6–0)	22 – Tillie	10 – Tillie	6 – Tied	McCarthey Athletic Center (6,000); Spokane, WA
January 25, 2020; 7:00 pm, KAYU/RTNW	No. 2	Pacific	W 92–59	21–1 (7–0)	22 – Tillie	8 – Tillie	4 – Ayayi	McCarthey Athletic Center (6,000); Spokane, WA
January 30, 2020; 7:30 pm, CBSSN	No. 2	at Santa Clara	W 87–72	22–1 (8–0)	31 – Petrušev	9 – Petrušev	6 – Woolridge	Leavey Center (4,200); Santa Clara, CA
February 1, 2020; 1:00 pm, KHQ/RTNW	No. 2	at San Francisco	W 83–79	23–1 (9–0)	23 – Petrušev	11 – Petrušev	3 – Timme	War Memorial Gymnasium (3,006); San Francisco, CA
February 6, 2020; 8:00 pm, CBSSN	No. 2	Loyola Marymount	W 85–67	24–1 (10–0)	21 – Petrušev	8 – Timme	4 – Tied	McCarthey Athletic Center (6,000); Spokane, WA
February 8, 2020; 7:00 pm, ESPN	No. 2	at Saint Mary's; Rivalry	W 90–60	25–1 (11–0)	20 – Timme	11 – Petrušev	5 – Gilder	University Credit Union Pavilion (3,500); Moraga, CA
February 15, 2020; 7:00 pm, ESPN	No. 2	at Pepperdine	W 89–77	26–1 (12–0)	27 – Petrušev	12 – Petrušev	5 – Tied	Firestone Fieldhouse (3,104); Malibu, CA
February 20, 2020; 8:00 pm, ESPN2	No. 2	San Francisco	W 71–54	27–1 (13–0)	22 – Tillie	9 – Tillie	7 – Woolridge	McCarthey Athletic Center (6,000); Spokane, WA
February 22, 2020; 7:00 pm, ESPN2	No. 2	at No. 23 BYU; Rivalry	L 78–91	27–2 (13–1)	18 – Tillie	8 – Tied	4 – Tied	Marriott Center (18,987); Provo, UT
February 27, 2020; 6:00 pm, KHQ/RTNW	No. 3	San Diego	W 94–59	28–2 (14–1)	21 – Petrušev	9 – Tied	6 – Woolridge	McCarthey Athletic Center (6,000); Spokane, WA
February 29, 2020; 7:00 pm, ESPN2	No. 3	Saint Mary's; Rivalry	W 86–76	29–2 (15–1)	27 – Petrušev	8 – Ayayi	4 – Tied	McCarthey Athletic Center (6,000); Spokane, WA
WCC Tournament
March 9, 2020; 6:00 pm, ESPN	(1) No. 2	vs. (5) San Francisco; Semifinals	W 81–77	30–2	19 – Tillie	10 – Tillie	3 – Petrušev	Orleans Arena (7,471); Paradise, NV
March 10, 2020; 6:00 pm, ESPN	(1) No. 2	vs. (3) Saint Mary's; Finals	W 84–66	31–2	17 – Tied	14 – Petrušev	5 – Petrušev	Orleans Arena (7,471); Paradise, NV
*Non-conference game. ^{#}Rankings from AP Poll. (#) Tournament seedings in parentheses. All times are in Pacific Time.

== Rankings ==
Ranking movements Legend: ██ Increase in ranking ██ Decrease in ranking ( ) = First-place votes
	Week																			
Poll	Pre	1	2	3	4	5	6	7	8	9	10	11	12	13	14	15	16	17	18	Final
AP	8	8	8	8	9	6	2 (15)	1 (54)	1 (63)	1 (54)	1 (30)	2 (31)	2 (19)	2 (15)	2 (15)	2 (14)	3	2	2	2
Coaches	7	7^	8	7	9	6	2 (4)	1 (23)	1 (30)	1 (27)	1 (16)	1 (19)	2 (17)	2 (12)	2 (13)	2 (11)	4	2	2	2

*AP does not release post-NCAA Tournament rankings
^Coaches did not release a Week 2 poll.
