= 2020 West Coast Conference men's basketball tournament =

- Classification: Division I
- Season: 2019–20
- Teams: 10
- Site: Orleans Arena; Paradise, Nevada
- Champions: Gonzaga (18th title)
- Winning coach: Mark Few (16th title)
- MVP: Joël Ayayi (Gonzaga)
- Television: ESPN, ESPN2, BYUtv

2019–20 West Coast Conference men's basketball standings
	Conf.				Overall
Team	W		L	PCT	W		L	PCT
No. 2 Gonzaga †	15	–	1	.938	31	–	2	.939
No. 14 BYU	13	–	3	.813	24	–	8	.750
Saint Mary's	11	–	5	.688	26	–	8	.765
Pacific	11	–	5	.688	23	–	10	.697
San Francisco	9	–	7	.563	22	–	12	.647
Pepperdine	8	–	8	.500	16	–	16	.500
Santa Clara	6	–	10	.375	20	–	13	.606
Loyola Marymount	4	–	12	.250	11	–	21	.344
San Diego	2	–	14	.125	9	–	23	.281
Portland	1	–	15	.063	9	–	23	.281
† 2020 WCC tournament winner Rankings from AP poll

The 2020 West Coast Conference men's basketball tournament was the postseason men's basketball tournament for the West Coast Conference during the 2019–20 NCAA Division I men's basketball season, held March 5–10 at the Orleans Arena in Paradise, Nevada.

Second-ranked Gonzaga won the tournament and received the conference's automatic bid to the 68-team NCAA tournament, which was cancelled due to the COVID-19 pandemic. For the second consecutive year, the Los Angeles-based University Credit Union was the title sponsor of the tournament.

== Venue ==
For the twelfth consecutive year, the WCC tournament was held in the Orleans Arena, with a seating capacity of 7,471 for basketball. The tournament is scheduled to be held at the Orleans Arena at least until 2022. The venue is located at the 1,886-room Orleans Hotel and Casino, about a mile (1.6 km) west of the Las Vegas Strip.

Tickets sold out for the 2020 WCC Tournament less than an hour after being made available to the public, marking the eleventh consecutive year that tickets sold out for the tournament.

== Seeds ==
All ten WCC teams participated in the tournament, seeded by conference record, with a tiebreaker system for identical conference records. The tournament returned to a format similar to that used from 2003 to 2011, with slight changes to the terminology used for the rounds prior to the semifinals. The 7 through 10 seeds played in the "first round", the 5 and 6 seeds started play in the "second round", and the 3 and 4 seeds started in the "third round". The top two seeds received byes into the semifinals.

Seed	School	Record	Tiebreaker 1	Tiebreaker 2
1	Gonzaga	15–1		
2	BYU	13–3		
3	Saint Mary's	11–5	1–1 vs. Pacific	2–0 vs. USF
4	Pacific	11–5	1–1 vs. St. Mary's	1–1 vs. USF
5	San Francisco	9–7		
6	Pepperdine	8–8		
7	Santa Clara	6–10		
8	Loyola Marymount	4–12		
9	San Diego	2–14		
10	Portland	1–15		

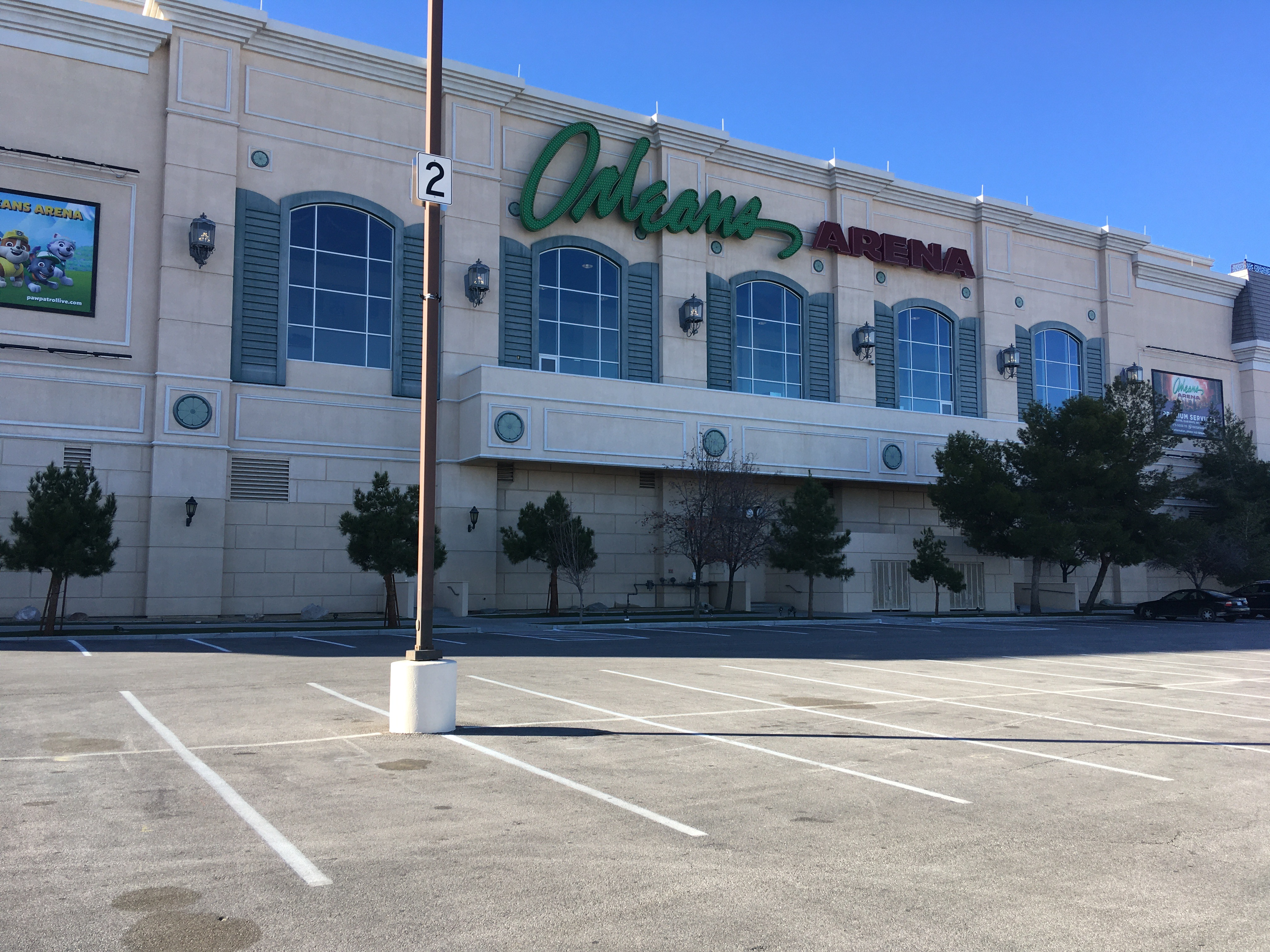
Orleans Arena, location of 2020 WCC tournament

== Schedule ==
Session	Game	Time*	Matchup^{#}	Score	Television	Attendance
First round – Thursday March 5, 2020
1	1	6:00 pm	No. 8 Loyola Marymount vs. No. 9 San Diego	75–61	BYUtv; Spectrum SportsNet; AT&T Sportsnet Rocky Mountain; Root Sports	1,983
1	2	8:00 pm	No. 7 Santa Clara vs. No. 10 Portland	76–62	BYUtv; Spectrum SportsNet; AT&T Sportsnet Rocky Mountain; Root Sports	1,983
Second round – Friday March 6, 2020
2	3	6:00 pm	No. 5 San Francisco vs. No. 8 Loyola Marymount	82–53	BYUtv; AT&T Sportsnet Rocky Mountain; Root Sports	3,850
2	4	8:00 pm	No. 6 Pepperdine vs. No. 7 Santa Clara	84–73	BYUtv; AT&T Sportsnet Rocky Mountain; Root Sports	3,850
Third round – Saturday, March 7, 2020
3	5	7:00 pm	No. 4 Pacific vs. No. 5 San Francisco	54–72	ESPN2	4,350
3	6	9:00 pm	No. 3 Saint Mary's vs. No. 6 Pepperdine	89–82	ESPN2	4,350
Semifinals – Monday, March 9, 2020
4	7	6:00 pm	No. 1 Gonzaga vs. No. 5 San Francisco	81–77	ESPN	7,471
4	8	8:30 pm	No. 2 BYU vs. No. 3 Saint Mary's	50–51	ESPN2	7,471
Championship – Tuesday, March 10, 2020
5	9	6:00 pm	No. 1 Gonzaga vs. No. 3 Saint Mary's	84–66	ESPN	7,210
*Game times in PT. #-Rankings denote tournament seeding.

== Bracket ==
First round Thursday, March 5 BYUtv
8	Loyola Marymount	75
9	San Diego	61
7	Santa Clara	76
10	Portland	62

Second round Friday, March 6 BYUtv
8	Loyola Marymount	53
5	San Francisco	82
6	Pepperdine	84
7	Santa Clara	73

Third round Saturday, March 7 ESPN2
5	San Francisco	72
4	Pacific	54
3	Saint Mary's	89**
6	Pepperdine	82

Semifinals; Monday, March 9 ESPN & ESPN2
5	San Francisco	77
1	Gonzaga	81
2	BYU	50
3	Saint Mary's	51

Championship; Tuesday, March 10; ESPN
1	Gonzaga	84
3	Saint Mary's	66
