= Tri-City Christian School (North Carolina) =

Coordinates: 35°43′42″N 81°12′21″W

Tri-City Christian School was a PreK-12th grade private Christian school located in Conover, North Carolina, just east of Hickory.

The school opened in 1996, and served the community through providing a Christian education experience for its students. Later after the school opened, it no longer was just a ministry of Tri-City Baptist Church, but invited students from various church backgrounds to attend. In June 2019, the school closed.

Tri-City Christian was a member school of the Association of Christian Schools International, the Southern Baptist Association of Christian Schools, and the North Carolina Association of Christian Schools.
