= Joël Ayayi =

French basketball player (born 2000)

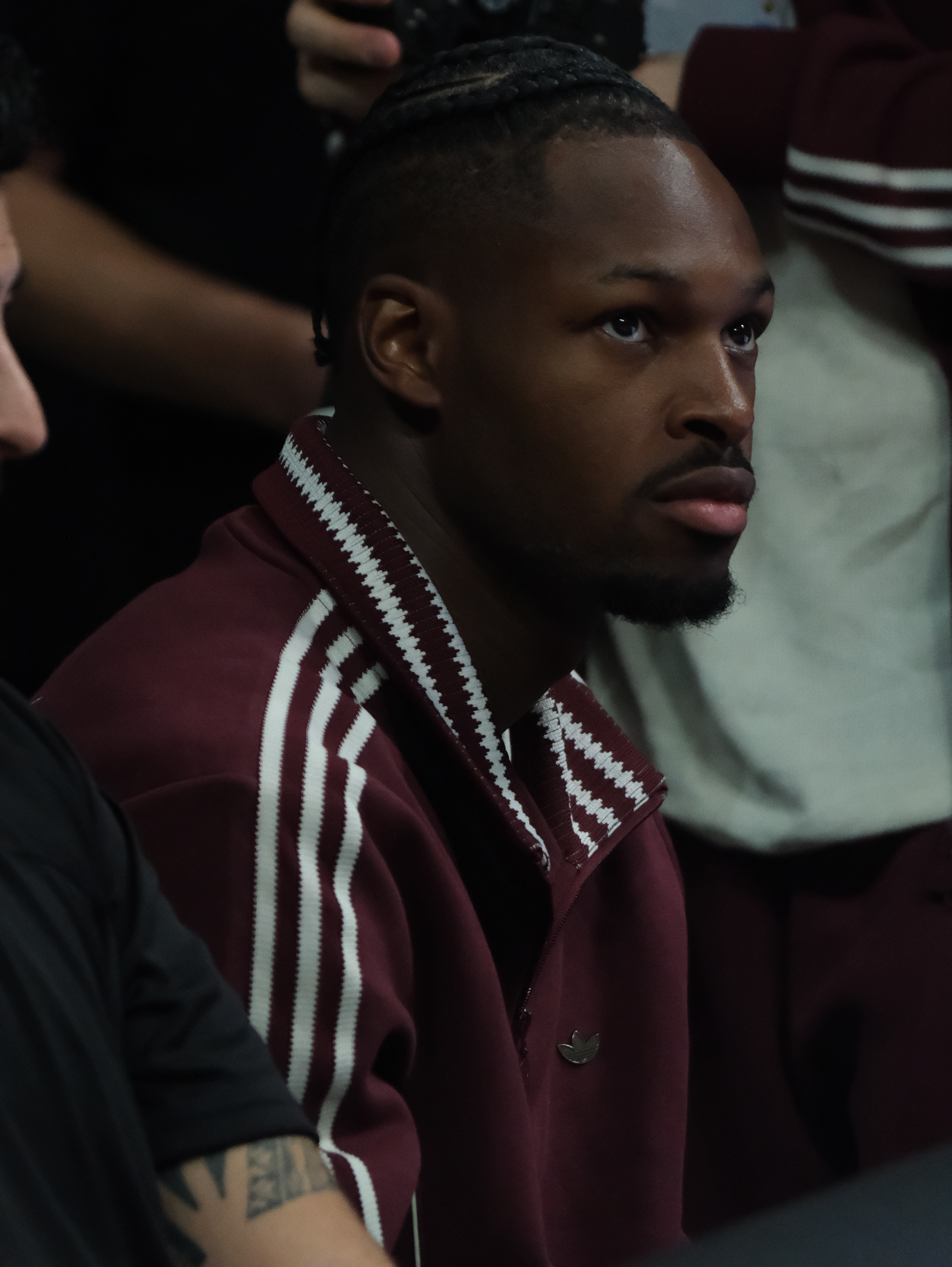
- Ayayi with the Paris Basketball in 2025

No. 11 – Paris Basketball
- Position: Shooting guard
- League: LNB Élite; EuroLeague

Personal information
- Born: 5 March 2000 (age 26) Bordeaux, France
- Listed height: 6 ft 5 in (1.96 m)
- Listed weight: 180 lb (82 kg)

Career information
- High school: INSEP (Paris, France)
- College: Gonzaga (2018–2021)
- NBA draft: 2021: undrafted
- Playing career: 2021–present

Career history
- 2021–2022: Washington Wizards
- 2021–2022: →Capital City Go-Go
- 2022–2023: Lakeland Magic
- 2023–2024: Nanterre 92
- 2024–2025: JL Bourg
- 2025–present: Paris Basketball

Career highlights
- First-team All-WCC (2021); WCC tournament MOP (2020)
- Stats at NBA.com
- Stats at Basketball Reference
Medals
Men's basketball
Representing France
FIBA Under-19 World Cup
Bronze medal – third place	2019 Greece	Team
FIBA U18 European Championship
Bronze medal – third place	2018 Latvia	Team

Joël Ayayi (born 5 March 2000) is a French professional basketball player for Paris Basketball of the LNB Élite and the EuroLeague. He played college basketball for the Gonzaga Bulldogs.

== Early life and career ==
Ayayi was born and raised in Bordeaux, France. Growing up, he idolized National Basketball Association (NBA) player and Bordeaux native Boris Diaw. Ayayi attended INSEP, a sports institute in Paris, and played for affiliated club Centre Fédéral.

=== Recruiting ===
He was considered a four-star recruit by Rivals and received NCAA Division I offers from Baylor, Georgia Tech, and Gonzaga. On 27 April 2017, Ayayi committed to play college basketball for Gonzaga.

College recruiting
Name	Hometown	School	Height	Weight	Commit date
Joël Ayayi; SG	Bordeaux, France	INSEP (FR)	6 ft 5 in (1.96 m)	175 lb (79 kg)	28 April 2017
Joël Ayayi; SG	Recruit ratings: Scout: Rivals: ESPN:				
Overall recruit ranking:
Note: In many cases, Scout, Rivals, 247Sports, On3, and ESPN may conflict in their listings of height and weight.; In these cases, the average was taken. ESPN grades are on a 100-point scale.; Sources: "2017 Team Ranking". Rivals.

Source: Rivals, Scout, ESPN

== College career ==
Ayayi joined the Gonzaga basketball team at age 17 and redshirted his first season to train with the team. In his redshirt freshman season, he averaged 5.6 minutes per game through 23 contests. On 27 November 2019, early in his sophomore season, Ayayi posted 21 points, 12 rebounds and six assists in a win over Southern Miss. He had 20 points in a 94–50 win over San Diego on 9 January 2020. At the conclusion of the regular season, Ayayi was named Honorable Mention All-West Coast Conference (WCC). On 10 March, he helped Gonzaga win the WCC tournament and was named Most Outstanding Player after scoring 17 points in the final against Saint Mary's. He averaged 10.6 points, 6.3 rebounds, and 3.2 per game for the Bulldogs and was All-WCC honorable mention. Following the season he declared for the 2020 NBA draft but did not hire an agent. On 1 August, Ayayi announced he was withdrawing from the draft and returning for his junior season.

Coming into his junior season, Ayayi was named to the Preseason All-WCC team. On 9 January 2021, he recorded the first triple-double in program history, with 12 points, 13 rebounds and 14 assists in a 116–88 win over Portland. He also tallied the second-most assists for a Gonzaga player in a single game. As a junior, he averaged 12 points, 6.9 rebounds and 2.7 assists per game and was named to the First Team All-West Coast Conference. Following the season, Ayayi declared for the 2021 NBA draft and forgo his remaining college eligibility.

== Professional career ==
=== Washington Wizards (2021–2022) ===
After going undrafted in the 2021 NBA draft, Ayayi signed a two-way contract with the Los Angeles Lakers on 3 August 2021. Under the terms of the deal he was to split time between the Lakers and their NBA G League affiliate, the South Bay Lakers. On 15 October, he was waived by Los Angeles and two days later, he signed a two-way contract with the Washington Wizards. Ayayi was then later waived on 8 March 2022.

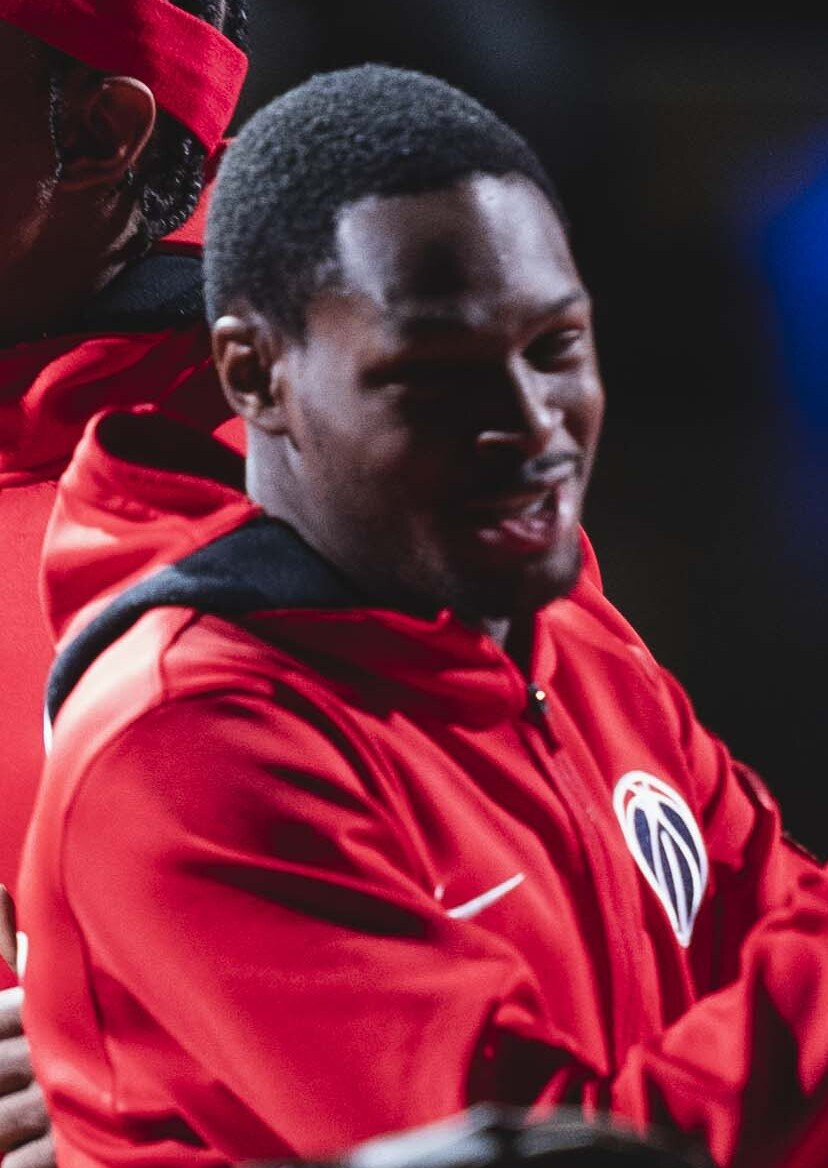
Ayayi with the Washington Wizards in 2021

=== Capital City Go-Go (2022) ===
On 11 March 2022 Ayayi was reacquired by the Capital City Go-Go.

Ayayi joined the Atlanta Hawks for the 2022 NBA Summer League.

=== Lakeland Magic (2022–2023) ===
On 3 November 2022 Ayayi was named to the opening night roster for the Lakeland Magic.

=== Nanterre 92 (2023–2024) ===
On 23 July 2023 Ayayi signed with Nanterre 92 of the LNB Pro A.

=== JL Bourg (2024–2025) ===
On May 31, 2024, he signed with JL Bourg of the LNB Pro A.

=== Paris Basketball (2025–present) ===
On July 3, 2025, he signed with Paris Basketball of the LNB Pro A.

== National team career ==
Ayayi holds dual citizenship to France and his parents' home country of Benin, but he plays basketball for the French national teams. At the 2016 FIBA U16 European Championship in Radom, Poland, he averaged 11.3 points and 6.7 rebounds per game for France. Ayayi led his team to a bronze medal at the 2018 FIBA U18 European Championship in Latvia. After averaging 15.7 points per game, he was named to the All-Star Five. Ayayi helped France win bronze at the 2019 FIBA Under-19 Basketball World Cup in Heraklion, Greece, where he earned All-Star Five honors. He averaged 20.9 points, 5.6 rebounds, and 3.4 assists per game and led all scorers with 33 points in a bronze medal game against Lithuania.

== Career statistics ==
Legend
GP	Games played	GS	Games started	MPG	Minutes per game
FG%	Field goal percentage	3P%	3-point field goal percentage	FT%	Free throw percentage
RPG	Rebounds per game	APG	Assists per game	SPG	Steals per game
BPG	Blocks per game	PPG	Points per game	**Bold**	Career high

=== NBA ===
Year	Team	GP	GS	MPG	FG%	3P%	FT%	RPG	APG	SPG	BPG	PPG
2021–22	Washington	7	0	2.9	.167	.000	–	.4	.6	.0	.0	.3
Career		7	0	2.9	.167	.000	–	.4	.6	.0	.0	.3

=== College ===
Year	Team	GP	GS	MPG	FG%	3P%	FT%	RPG	APG	SPG	BPG	PPG
2017–18	Gonzaga	Redshirt										
2018–19	Gonzaga	23	0	5.6	.531	.273	.286	1.4	.5	.3	0	1.7
2019–20	Gonzaga	**33**	23	29.3	.483	.345	**.825**	6.3	**3.2**	**1.3**	**.2**	10.6
2020–21	Gonzaga	32	**31**	**31.3**	**.575**	**.389**	.781	**6.9**	2.7	1.1	**.2**	**12.0**
Career		88	54	23.8	.529	.360	.776	5.2	2.3	.9	.2	8.8

== Personal life ==
Both of Ayayi's parents are from Benin. His father stands 2.01 m (6 ft 7 in) and played basketball professionally in France and for the Beninese national team. Ayayi's older sister Valériane plays for the French women's national team, medalist at the 2020 and 2024 Summer Olympics, and with a season in the Women's National Basketball Association (WNBA). His younger brother Gérald plays professional basketball in France.
