= List of 2020–21 NBA season transactions =

This is a list of transactions that have taken place during the 2020 NBA off-season and the 2020–21 NBA season.

== Retirement ==
| Date | Name | Team(s) played (years) | Age | Notes | Ref. |
|---|---|---|---|---|---|
| September 8 | Marvin Williams | Atlanta Hawks (2005–2012); Utah Jazz (2012–2014); Charlotte Hornets (2014–2020); Milwaukee Bucks (2020) | 34 | NBA All-Rookie Second Team (2006) | |
| September 14 | Leandro Barbosa | Phoenix Suns (2003–2010); Toronto Raptors (2010–2012); Indiana Pacers (2012); Boston Celtics (2012–2013); Washington Wizards (2013); Phoenix Suns (2014); Golden State Warriors (2014–2016); Phoenix Suns (2016–2017) | 37 | NBA champion (2015); NBA Sixth Man of the Year (2007); Also played overseas. Hired as Player Mentor Coach by the Golden State Warriors. | |
| October 24 | Kevin Séraphin | Washington Wizards (2010–2015); New York Knicks (2015–2016); Indiana Pacers (2016–2017) | 30 | Also played overseas. | |
| November 16 | Corey Brewer | Minnesota Timberwolves (2007–2011); Dallas Mavericks (2011); Denver Nuggets (2011–2013); Minnesota Timberwolves (2013–2014); Houston Rockets (2014–2017); Los Angeles Lakers (2017–2018); Oklahoma City Thunder (2018); Philadelphia 76ers (2019); Sacramento Kings (2019, 2020) | 34 | NBA champion (2011); Hired as Player development coach by the New Orleans Pelicans. | |
| November 18 | Dorell Wright | Miami Heat (2004–2010); Golden State Warriors (2010–2012); Philadelphia 76ers (2012–2013); Portland Trail Blazers (2013–2015); Miami Heat (2016) | 34 | NBA champion (2006); Also played in the NBA D-League and overseas. | |
| November 25 | Aaron Brooks | Houston Rockets (2007–2011); Phoenix Suns (2011); Sacramento Kings (2011–2013); Houston Rockets (2013–2014); Denver Nuggets (2014); Chicago Bulls (2014–2016); Indiana Pacers (2016–2017); Minnesota Timberwolves (2017–2018) | 35 | Most Improved Player (2010); Also played in the NBA D-League and overseas. Hired as two-way liaison by the New York Knicks. | |
| November 30 | Andrew Bogut | Milwaukee Bucks (2005–2012); Golden State Warriors (2012–2016); Dallas Mavericks (2016–2017); Cleveland Cavaliers (2017); Los Angeles Lakers (2017–2018); Golden State Warriors (2019) | 36 | NBA champion (2015); All-NBA Third Team (2010); NBA All-Defensive Second Team (2015); NBA All-Rookie First Team (2006); NBA blocks leader (2011); Also played overseas. | |
| November 30 | Evan Turner | Philadelphia 76ers (2010–2014); Indiana Pacers (2014); Boston Celtics (2014–2016); Portland Trail Blazers (2016–2019); Atlanta Hawks (2019–2020) | 32 | Hired as Player development coach by the Boston Celtics. | |
| February 4 | Lucas Nogueira | Toronto Raptors (2014–2018) | 28 | Also played in the NBA D-League and overseas. | |
| March 1 | Joakim Noah | Chicago Bulls (2007–2016); New York Knicks (2016–2018); Memphis Grizzlies (2018–2019); Los Angeles Clippers (2020) | 36 | NBA All-Star (2013, 2014); All-NBA First Team (2014); NBA Defensive Player of the Year (2014); NBA All-Defensive First Team (2013, 2014); NBA All-Defensive Second Team (2011); J. Walter Kennedy Citizenship Award (2015); Also played in the NBA D-League. | |
| March 31 | Thabo Sefolosha | Chicago Bulls (2006–2009); Oklahoma City Thunder (2009–2014); Atlanta Hawks (2014–2017); Utah Jazz (2017–2019); Houston Rockets (2019–2020) | 36 | NBA All-Defensive Second Team (2010); Also played overseas. | |
| April 15 | LaMarcus Aldridge | Portland Trail Blazers (2006–2015); San Antonio Spurs (2015–2021); Brooklyn Nets (2021) | 35 | NBA All-Star (2012–2016, 2018, 2019); All-NBA Second Team (2015, 2018); All-NBA Third Team (2011, 2014, 2016); NBA All-Rookie First Team (2007) | |
| May 16 | Anderson Varejão | Cleveland Cavaliers (2004–2016; 2021); Golden State Warriors (2016–2017) | 38 | NBA All-Defensive Second Team (2010); Also played overseas. | |

== Front office movements ==
=== Head coaching changes ===
Off-season

| Departure date | Team | Outgoing head coach | Reason for departure | Hire date | Incoming head coach | Last coaching position | Ref. |
|---|---|---|---|---|---|---|---|
| July 30 | New York Knicks | Mike Miller (interim) | Demoted | July 30 | Tom Thibodeau | Minnesota Timberwolves head coach (2016–2019) | |
| August 14 | Chicago Bulls | Jim Boylen | Fired | September 22 | Billy Donovan | Oklahoma City Thunder head coach (2015–2020) | |
| August 15 | New Orleans Pelicans | Alvin Gentry | Fired | October 22 | Stan Van Gundy | Detroit Pistons head coach (2014–2018) | |
| August 24 | Philadelphia 76ers | Brett Brown | Fired | October 3 | Doc Rivers | Los Angeles Clippers head coach (2013–2020) | |
| August 26 | Indiana Pacers | Nate McMillan | Fired | October 20 | Nate Bjorkgren | Toronto Raptors assistant coach (2018–2020) | |
| September 3 | Brooklyn Nets | Jacque Vaughn (interim) | Demoted | September 3 | Steve Nash | Golden State Warriors player development consultant (2015–2020) | |
| September 8 | Oklahoma City Thunder | Billy Donovan | Mutually agree to part ways | November 11 | Mark Daigneault | Oklahoma City Thunder Assistant Head Coach (2019–2020) | . |
| September 13 | Houston Rockets | Mike D'Antoni | End of Contract | October 30 | Stephen Silas | Dallas Mavericks assistant coach (2018–2020) | |
| September 28 | Los Angeles Clippers | Doc Rivers | Mutually agree to part ways | October 20 | Tyronn Lue | Los Angeles Clippers lead assistant coach (2019–2020) | |

In-Season

| Departure date | Team | Outgoing head coach | Reason for departure | Hire date | Incoming head coach | Last coaching position | Ref. |
|---|---|---|---|---|---|---|---|
| February 21 | Minnesota Timberwolves | Ryan Saunders | Fired | February 22 | Chris Finch | Toronto Raptors assistant coach (2020–2021) | |
| March 1 | Atlanta Hawks | Lloyd Pierce | Fired | March 1 | Nate McMillan (Interim) | Atlanta Hawks assistant coach (2020–2021) | |

=== General manager changes ===
| Departure date | Team | Outgoing general manager | Reason for departure | Hire date | Incoming general manager | Last managerial position | Ref. |
|---|---|---|---|---|---|---|---|
| August 14 | Sacramento Kings | Vlade Divac | Resigned | August 14 | Monte McNair | Sacramento Kings qpecial advisor to general manager (2019–2020) | |
| October 15 | Houston Rockets | Daryl Morey | Resigned | October 15 | Rafael Stone | Executive vice president of basketball operations of the Houston Rockets (2019–2020) | |

== Player movements ==
=== Trades ===
November
| November 16 | To Oklahoma City Thunder: Ty Jerome; Jalen Lecque; Kelly Oubre Jr.; Ricky Rubio; 2022 PHO protected first-round pick (Note: Oklahoma will receive the pick in 2022 if it's No. 13-30, in 2023 if No. 11-30, in 2024 if No. 9-30, in 2025 if not conveyed earlier. Conveyed in 2022.) | To Phoenix Suns: Abdel Nader; Chris Paul |
| November 17 | To New York Knicks: 2020 UTA first-round pick (No. 23); rights to Ante Tomić (2008 No. 44) | To Utah Jazz: 2020 LAC first-round pick (No. 27); 2020 CHA second-round pick (No. 38) |
| November 18 (Draft-day trades) | To Cleveland Cavaliers: removal of protection on 2022 MIL first-round pick; 2025 MIL second-round pick | To Milwaukee Bucks: rights to İlkan Karaman (2012 No. 57) |
| November 18 (Draft-day trades) | To Milwaukee Bucks: 2020 ORL second-round pick (No. 45) | To Orlando Magic: 2022 IND protected second-round pick (Note: Orlando will receive the pick the year after Indiana conveys their second-round pick to Brooklyn, which will happen in 2021 if the pick is No. 31-44, in 2022 if No. 31-44, or in 2023 regardless of position. Orlando received the pick in 2022.); 2026 MIL second-round pick |
| November 19 | To Boston Celtics: 2021 OKC protected second-round pick (Note: Boston will receive the pick if it's No. 56-60, otherwise they receive nothing. Oklahoma City's pick fell in its protected range, so Boston received nothing.) | To Oklahoma City Thunder: Vincent Poirier; cash considerations |
| November 19 | To Charlotte Hornets: rights to Nick Richards (No. 42) | To New Orleans Pelicans: 2024 CHA second-round pick (Note: New Orleans traded this pick to Oklahoma City on November 24) |
| November 19 | To Dallas Mavericks: Josh Richardson; rights to Tyler Bey (No. 36) | To Philadelphia 76ers: Seth Curry |
| November 19 | To Los Angeles Clippers: rights to Daniel Oturu (No. 33) | To Minnesota Timberwolves: rights to Mathias Lessort (2017 No. 50) (Note: Lessort's rights were traded to New York on November 20.); 2023 DET second-round pick (Note: Minnesota traded this pick to New York on November 20) |
| November 19 | To Los Angeles Lakers: Dennis Schröder | To Oklahoma City Thunder: Danny Green; rights to Jaden McDaniels (No. 28) (Note: McDaniels' rights were traded to Minnesota on November 20.) |
| November 19 | To Memphis Grizzlies: rights to Xavier Tillman (No. 35) | To Sacramento Kings: rights to Robert Woodard II (No. 40); 2022 second-round pick (Note: Sacramento will receive the worse of the picks originally belonging to Chicago and Detroit. Sacramento received Chicago's pick.) |
| November 19 | To New Orleans Pelicans: 2022 UTA second-round pick; cash considerations | To Utah Jazz: rights to Elijah Hughes (No. 39) |
| November 19 | To Oklahoma City Thunder: Admiral Schofield; rights to Vít Krejčí (No. 37) | To Washington Wizards: rights to Cassius Winston (No. 53); 2024 MEM second-round pick |
| November 19 | Three-team trade | |
| November 19 | To Brooklyn Nets: Bruce Brown (from Detroit); Landry Shamet (from LA Clippers); rights to Reggie Perry (No. 57) (from LA Clippers) | To Detroit Pistons: Rodney McGruder (from LA Clippers); Džanan Musa (from Brooklyn); rights to Saddiq Bey (No. 19) (from Brooklyn); rights to Jaylen Hands (2019 No. 56) (from Brooklyn); 2021 TOR second-round pick (from Brooklyn); cash considerations (from LA Clippers) |
| November 19 | To Los Angeles Clippers: Luke Kennard (from Detroit); Justin Patton (from Detroit); rights to Jay Scrubb (No. 55) (from Brooklyn); 2023 POR second-round pick (from Detroit); 2024 DET second-round pick (from Detroit); 2025 DET second-round pick (from Detroit); 2026 DET second-round pick (from Detroit) | |
| November 20 | To Atlanta Hawks: Tony Snell; Khyri Thomas | To Detroit Pistons: Dewayne Dedmon |
| November 20 | Three-team trade | |
| November 20 | To Minnesota Timberwolves: Ricky Rubio (from Oklahoma City); rights to Leandro Bolmaro (No. 23) (from New York); rights to Jaden McDaniels (No. 28) (from Oklahoma City) | To New York Knicks: rights to Immanuel Quickley (No. 25) (from Oklahoma City); rights to Mathias Lessort (2017 No. 50) (from Minnesota); 2023 DET second-round pick (from Minnesota) |
| November 20 | To Oklahoma City Thunder: James Johnson (from Minnesota); rights to Aleksej Pokuševski (No. 17) (from Minnesota); 2024 MIN second-round pick (from Minnesota) | |
| November 20 | Three-team trade | |
| November 20 | To Boston Celtics: 2023 second-round pick (Note: The second-best of the three picks originally belonging to Dallas, Houston, and Miami. If the Houston pick is No. 31-32, Boston receives the worse of the Dallas and Miami picks. Part of this tangled skein of swap rights was traded from Dallas to Oklahoma City on November 27.) (from Memphis); 2025 MEM second-round pick (from Memphis) | To Memphis Grizzlies: Mario Hezonja (from Portland); rights to Desmond Bane (No. 30) (from Boston) |
| November 20 | To Portland Trail Blazers: Enes Kanter (from Boston); cash considerations (from Memphis) | |
| November 22 | To Denver Nuggets: cash considerations | To Detroit Pistons: Jerami Grant (sign and trade); rights to Nikola Radičević (2015 No. 57) |
| November 22 | To Detroit Pistons: Tony Bradley; rights to Saben Lee (No. 38) | To Utah Jazz: cash considerations |
| November 22 | To Golden State Warriors: Kelly Oubre Jr. | To Oklahoma City Thunder: 2021 GSW protected first-round pick (Note: Oklahoma City will receive the pick if it's No. 21-30, otherwise they receive Minnesota's 2021 second-round pick. Golden State's pick fell in its protected range, so Oklahoma City received Minnesota's second-round pick.); 2021 DEN second-round pick |
| November 22 | To Houston Rockets: Trevor Ariza; rights to Isaiah Stewart (No. 16) (Note: Stewart's rights were traded to Detroit on November 24.); 2021 POR protected first-round pick (Note: Houston will receive the pick in 2021 if it's No. 15-30, rolling over with the same protection through 2027; if the pick is never No. 15-30, Houston will receive Portland's 2027 second-round pick. Portland's pick fell outside the protected range, so it was conveyed to Houston.) | To Portland Trail Blazers: Robert Covington |
| November 22 | To New York Knicks: Ed Davis; 2023 UTA second-round pick; 2024 second-round pick (Note: The better of the picks originally belonging to Cleveland and Utah.) | To Utah Jazz: cash considerations |
| November 23 | To Cleveland Cavaliers: JaVale McGee; 2026 LAL second-round pick | To Los Angeles Lakers: Jordan Bell; Alfonzo McKinnie |
| November 23 | To Detroit Pistons: Zhaire Smith | To Philadelphia 76ers: Tony Bradley |
| November 23 | Four-team trade | |
| November 23 | To Denver Nuggets: rights to R. J. Hampton (No. 24) (from Milwaukee) | To Milwaukee Bucks: Jrue Holiday (from New Orleans); rights to Sam Merrill (No. 60) (from New Orleans) |
| November 23 | To New Orleans Pelicans: Steven Adams (from Oklahoma City); Eric Bledsoe (from Milwaukee); 2024 right to swap first-round pick with MIL (from Milwaukee); 2025 MIL first-round pick (from Milwaukee); 2026 right to swap first-round pick with MIL (from Milwaukee); 2027 MIL first-round pick (from Milwaukee) | To Oklahoma City Thunder: Zylan Cheatham (from New Orleans) (sign and trade); Josh Gray (from New Orleans) (sign and trade); George Hill (from Milwaukee); Darius Miller (from New Orleans); Kenrich Williams (from New Orleans) (sign and trade); 2023 DEN protected first-round pick (Note: Oklahoma City will receive the pick if it's No. 15-30, in 2024 (No. 15-30), or in 2025 (No. 15-30); if the pick isn't conveyed, Oklahoma City will receive Denver's 2025 and 2026 second-round picks.) (from Denver); 2023 WAS second-round pick (from New Orleans); 2024 CHA second-round pick (from New Orleans) |
| November 24 | To Atlanta Hawks: Danilo Gallinari (sign and trade); cash considerations | To Oklahoma City Thunder: 2025 ATL protected second-round pick (Note: Oklahoma City will receive the pick if it's No. 56-60, otherwise they receive nothing.) |
| November 24 | To Detroit Pistons: Trevor Ariza; rights to Isaiah Stewart (No. 16); 2027 HOU second-round pick; cash considerations | To Houston Rockets: Christian Wood (sign and trade); 2021 DET protected first-round pick (Note: Houston will receive the pick in 2021 if it is No. 17-30, 2022 (No. 17-30), 2023 (No. 19-30), 2024 (No. 19-30), 2025 (No. 14-30), 2026 (No. 12-30), or in 2027 (No. 10-30); if the pick is not conveyed, Houston will receive Detroit's 2027 second-round pick. Detroit's pick fell in its protected range in 2021 and 2022, so Houston's claim rolled over.); 2021 LAL second-round pick (Note: This pick was traded to Sacramento on November 25.) |
| November 24 | To Minnesota Timberwolves: Ed Davis | To New York Knicks: Jacob Evans; Omari Spellman; 2026 MIN second-round pick |
| November 25 | To Houston Rockets: rights to Kenyon Martin Jr. (No. 52) | To Sacramento Kings: 2021 LAL second-round pick; cash considerations |
| November 25 | To Indiana Pacers: Jalen Lecque | To Oklahoma City Thunder: T. J. Leaf; 2027 IND second-round pick |
| November 27 | To Cleveland Cavaliers: Rayjon Tucker; 2027 UTA second-round pick | To Utah Jazz: cash considerations |
| November 27 | To Houston Rockets: rights to Issuf Sanon (2018 No. 44) | To New York Knicks: Austin Rivers (sign and trade); rights to Axel Hervelle (2005 No. 52); rights to Tadija Dragićević (2008 No. 53); rights to Sergio Llull (2009 No. 34) |
| November 27 | Three-team trade | |
| November 27 | To Dallas Mavericks: James Johnson (from Oklahoma City) | To Detroit Pistons: Delon Wright (from Dallas) |
| November 27 | To Oklahoma City Thunder: Trevor Ariza (from Detroit); Justin Jackson (from Dallas); 2023 second-round pick (Note: The better of the picks originally belonging to Dallas and Miami.) (from Dallas); 2026 DAL second-round pick (from Dallas) | |
| November 29 | To Boston Celtics: 2022 CHA protected second-round pick (Note: Boston will receive the pick if it's No. 56-60, otherwise they receive nothing. The pick fell within its protected range and was not conveyed.) | To Charlotte Hornets: Gordon Hayward (sign and trade); 2023 BOS second-round pick; 2024 BOS second-round pick |
December
| December 2 | To Houston Rockets: John Wall; 2023 WAS protected first-round pick (Note: Houston will receive the pick if it's No. 15-30, in 2024 (No. 13-30), in 2025 (No. 11-30), or 2026 (No. 9-30); if the pick is not conveyed, Houston will receive Washington's 2026 and 2027 second-round picks.) | To Washington Wizards: Russell Westbrook |
| December 8 | To Oklahoma City Thunder: Al Horford; rights to Théo Maledon (No. 34); rights to Vasilije Micić (2014 No. 52); 2025 PHI protected first-round pick (Note: Oklahoma City Thunder will receive the pick in 2025 if it's No. 7-30, in 2026 (No. 5-30), or in 2027 (No. 5-30); if the pick is not conveyed, Oklahoma City will receive Philadelphia's 2027 second-round pick.) | To Philadelphia 76ers: Terrance Ferguson; Danny Green; Vincent Poirier |
January
| January 16 | Four-team trade | |
| January 16 | To Brooklyn Nets: James Harden (from Houston) | To Cleveland Cavaliers: Jarrett Allen (from Brooklyn); Taurean Prince (from Brooklyn); rights to Sasha Vezenkov (2017 No. 57) |
| January 16 | To Houston Rockets: Dante Exum (from Cleveland); Rodions Kurucs (from Brooklyn); Victor Oladipo (from Indiana); 2021 right to swap first-round pick with BKN (Note: After Oklahoma City chooses whether to swap its own pick or Miami's pick for Houston's, Houston may swap the pick it holds for Brooklyn's pick. If Houston's own pick is No. 1-4 Oklahoma City may not swap picks. Brooklyn's pick was later in the first round than any pick Houston held.) (from Brooklyn); 2022 BKN first-round pick (from Brooklyn); 2022 MIL first-round pick (from Cleveland); 2023 right to swap first-round pick with BKN (from Brooklyn); 2024 BKN first-round pick (from Brooklyn); 2025 right to swap first-round pick with BKN (Note: After Oklahoma City chooses whether to swap its pick for Houston's, Houston may swap the pick it holds for Brooklyn's pick. If Houston's own pick is No. 1-10 Oklahoma City may not swap picks.) (from Brooklyn); 2026 BKN first-round pick (from Brooklyn); 2027 right to swap first-round pick with BKN (from Brooklyn) | To Indiana Pacers: Caris LeVert (from Brooklyn); 2023 second-round pick (Note: The worst of the picks originally belonging to Dallas, Houston, and Miami. If Houston's pick is No. 31-32 it will go to Indiana.) (from Houston); 2024 second-round pick (Note: The worse of the picks originally belonging to Cleveland and Utah.) (from Cleveland); Cash considerations (from Brooklyn) |
| January 22 | To Houston Rockets: Kevin Porter Jr. | To Cleveland Cavaliers: 2024 GSW protected second-round pick (Note: Cleveland will receive the pick if it's No. 56-60, otherwise Houston retains the pick and Cleveland receives nothing.) |
February
| February 8 | To Detroit Pistons: Dennis Smith Jr.; 2021 CHA second-round pick | To New York Knicks: Derrick Rose |
March
| March 13 | To Detroit Pistons: Hamidou Diallo | To Oklahoma City Thunder: Sviatoslav Mykhailiuk; 2027 HOU second-round pick |
| March 17 | To Miami Heat: Trevor Ariza | To Oklahoma City Thunder: Meyers Leonard; 2027 MIA second-round pick |
| March 18 | To Milwaukee Bucks: Cash considerations | To Phoenix Suns: Torrey Craig |
| March 19 | To Houston Rockets: D. J. Augustin; D. J. Wilson; 2021 MIL protected first-round pick swap right (Note: Houston already has the right to swap their second-round pick for Philadelphia's, after which they have the right to swap the second-round pick they have for Milwaukee's first-round pick if it's No. 10-30, otherwise the Milwaukee swap right expires. Milwaukee's pick fell outside its protected range, making it available to Houston. Philadelphia's second-round pick was later than Houston's, so Houston did not exercise that swap right.); 2023 MIL first-round pick | To Milwaukee Bucks: Rodions Kurucs; P. J. Tucker; 2022 MIL first-round pick |
| March 22 | To Los Angeles Clippers: 2022 SAC protected second-round pick (Note: The Clippers will receive the pick if it's No. 55-60, otherwise they receive nothing. The pick fell within its protected range and was not conveyed.) | To Sacramento Kings: Mfiondu Kabengele; 2022 ATL second-round pick (Note: Sacramento will receive the pick if it's No. 56-60, otherwise they receive nothing. The pick fell within its protected range and was not conveyed.); Cash considerations |
| March 25 | To Atlanta Hawks: Lou Williams; 2023 POR second-round pick; 2027 LAC second-round pick; Cash considerations | To Los Angeles Clippers: Rajon Rondo |
| March 25 | To Boston Celtics: Evan Fournier | To Orlando Magic: Jeff Teague; 2025 second-round pick (Note: The worse of the picks originally belonging to Boston and Memphis.); 2027 BOS second-round pick |
| March 25 | To Charlotte Hornets: Brad Wanamaker; 2022 TOR protected second-round pick (Note: Charlotte will receive the pick if it's No. 55-60, otherwise the pick will remain with Golden State. The pick fell within its protected range and was instead conveyed to Golden State.); Cash considerations | To Golden State Warriors: 2025 CHA protected second-round pick (Note: Golden State will receive the pick if it's No. 56-60, otherwise they receive nothing.) |
| March 25 | To Chicago Bulls: Al-Farouq Aminu; Nikola Vučević | To Orlando Magic: Wendell Carter Jr.; Otto Porter; 2021 CHI protected first-round pick (Note: Orlando will receive the pick in 2021 if it's No. 5-30, otherwise rolling over to 2022 if it's No. 4-30; if not conveyed by 2022, it will convert to Chicago's 2024 and 2025 second-round picks.); 2023 CHI protected first-round pick (Note: Orlando will receive this pick two years after the first, if it's No. 5-30 in the first available year or No. 4-30 in the second; if not conveyed in either year it will convert to Chicago's 2026 and 2027 second-round picks.) |
| March 25 | To Cleveland Cavaliers: Isaiah Hartenstein; 2023 DEN protected second-round pick (Note: Cleveland will receive the pick if it's No. 47-60, otherwise they receive nothing.); 2027 DEN second-round pick | To Denver Nuggets: JaVale McGee |
| March 25 | To Dallas Mavericks: Nicolò Melli; JJ Redick | To New Orleans Pelicans: Wes Iwundu; James Johnson; 2021 DAL second-round pick; Cash considerations |
| March 25 | To Denver Nuggets: Gary Clark; Aaron Gordon | To Orlando Magic: R. J. Hampton; Gary Harris; 2025 DEN first-round pick (Note: Denver first owes its 2023 first-round pick to Oklahoma City. The protections on that pick mean it will be at least 2025 before Orlando receives Denver's pick, which it will do if it's No. 6-30, rolling over with the same protection for three years.) |
| March 25 | To Detroit Pistons: Cory Joseph; 2021 LAL second-round pick; 2024 SAC second-round pick | To Sacramento Kings: Delon Wright |
| March 25 | To Golden State Warriors: rights to Cady Lalanne (2015 No. 55) | To San Antonio Spurs: Marquese Chriss; Cash considerations |
| March 25 | To Houston Rockets: Avery Bradley; Kelly Olynyk; 2022 limited right to swap first-round pick (Note: If Miami's pick is No. 15-30 then Houston may swap either its pick or Brooklyn's for Miami's. If Miami's pick is No. 1-14 then Houston will instead retain Brooklyn's pick and receive the worse of the second-round picks originally belonging to Denver and Philadelphia. Houston finished with the worst record in the league, Miami with one of the best.) | To Miami Heat: Victor Oladipo |
| March 25 | To Miami Heat: Nemanja Bjelica | To Sacramento Kings: Maurice Harkless; Chris Silva |
| March 25 | To Portland Trail Blazers: Norman Powell | To Toronto Raptors: Rodney Hood; Gary Trent Jr. |
| March 25 | To Sacramento Kings: Terence Davis | To Toronto Raptors: 2021 MEM second-round pick |
| March 25 | To Toronto Raptors: 2021 GSW second-round pick | To Utah Jazz: Matt Thomas |
| March 25 | Three-team trade | |
| March 25 | To Boston Celtics: Luke Kornet (from CHI); Moritz Wagner (from WAS) | To Chicago Bulls: Troy Brown Jr. (from WAS); Javonte Green (from BOS); Daniel Theis (from BOS); Cash considerations (from BOS and WAS) |
| March 25 | To Washington Wizards: Daniel Gafford (from CHI); Chandler Hutchison (from CHI) | |
| March 25 | Three-team trade | |
| March 25 | To New York Knicks: Terrance Ferguson (from PHI); Vincent Poirier (from PHI); rights to Emir Preldžić (2009 No. 57) (from PHI); 2021 second-round pick (Note: Houston has the right to swap picks with Philadelphia before the 76ers convey a pick to New York. Philadelphia's pick was later in the round than Houston's, so Houston did not exercise their swap right.) (from PHI); 2024 MIA protected second-round pick (Note: New York will receive the pick if it's No. 56-60, otherwise they receive nothing.) (from PHI) | To Oklahoma City Thunder: Tony Bradley (from PHI); Austin Rivers (from NYK); 2025 PHI second-round pick (from PHI); 2026 PHI second-round pick (from PHI) |
| March 25 | To Philadelphia 76ers: Ignas Brazdeikis (from NYK); George Hill (from OKC) | |

=== Free agents ===
On November 9, it was announced that free agency would begin on November 20 at 6 p.m. ET, with signings permitted starting at 12 p.m. ET on November 22.

| Denotes unsigned players whose free-agent rights were renounced |
| Denotes sign and trade players |
| Denotes player who is signed after buyout |
| Denotes signed player to Training Camp who failed to make opening day roster |
| Denotes signed player whose contract is Non Fully Guaranteed on opening day |
| Denotes player signed to 10-day contract |

| Player | Date signed | New team | Former team | Ref |
|---|---|---|---|---|
| Carmelo Anthony | November 21 | Portland Trail Blazers | | |
| Dwight Howard | November 21 | Philadelphia 76ers | Los Angeles Lakers | |
| Raul Neto | November 21 | Washington Wizards | Philadelphia 76ers | |
| Denzel Valentine (RFA) | November 21 | Chicago Bulls | | |
| Dāvis Bertāns | November 22 | Washington Wizards | | |
| Alec Burks | November 22 | New York Knicks | Philadelphia 76ers | |
| Kentavious Caldwell-Pope | November 22 | Los Angeles Lakers | | |
| Goran Dragić | November 22 | Miami Heat | | |
| Harry Giles | November 22 | Portland Trail Blazers | Sacramento Kings | |
| Jerami Grant | November 22 | Detroit Pistons | Denver Nuggets | |
| Montrezl Harrell | November 22 | Los Angeles Lakers | Los Angeles Clippers | |
| Justin Holiday | November 22 | Indiana Pacers | | |
| Rodney Hood | November 22 | Portland Trail Blazers | | |
| Derrick Jones Jr. | November 22 | Portland Trail Blazers | Miami Heat | |
| John Konchar**** (RFA) | November 22 | Memphis Grizzlies | | |
| Meyers Leonard | November 22 | Miami Heat | | |
| Robin Lopez | November 22 | Washington Wizards | Milwaukee Bucks | |
| Wesley Matthews | November 22 | Los Angeles Lakers | Milwaukee Bucks | |
| De'Anthony Melton (RFA) | November 22 | Memphis Grizzlies | | |
| Jontay Porter** (RFA) | November 22 | Memphis Grizzlies | | |
| Kent Bazemore | November 23 | Golden State Warriors | Sacramento Kings | |
| Avery Bradley* | November 23 | Miami Heat | Los Angeles Lakers | |
| Jevon Carter (RFA) | November 23 | Phoenix Suns | | |
| Zylan Cheatham**** (RFA) | November 23 | Oklahoma City Thunder | New Orleans Pelicans | |
| Gary Clark (RFA) | November 23 | Orlando Magic | | |
| Jordan Clarkson | November 23 | Utah Jazz | | |
| Pat Connaughton | November 23 | Milwaukee Bucks | | |
| Drew Eubanks**** (RFA) | November 23 | San Antonio Spurs | | |
| Jeff Green | November 23 | Brooklyn Nets | Houston Rockets | |
| Josh Gray**** (RFA) | November 23 | Oklahoma City Thunder | New Orleans Pelicans | |
| Maurice Harkless | November 23 | Miami Heat | New York Knicks | |
| Joe Harris | November 23 | Brooklyn Nets | | |
| Markieff Morris | November 23 | Los Angeles Lakers | | |
| Rajon Rondo | November 23 | Atlanta Hawks | Los Angeles Lakers | |
| Brad Wanamaker (RFA) | November 23 | Golden State Warriors | Boston Celtics | |
| Kenrich Williams (RFA) | November 23 | Oklahoma City Thunder | New Orleans Pelicans | |
| Dwayne Bacon (RFA) | November 24 | Orlando Magic | Charlotte Hornets | |
| Aron Baynes | November 24 | Toronto Raptors | Phoenix Suns | |
| Bogdan Bogdanović (RFA) | November 24 | Atlanta Hawks | Sacramento Kings | |
| Bol Bol**** | November 24 | Denver Nuggets | | |
| Michael Carter-Williams | November 24 | Orlando Magic | | |
| Matthew Dellavedova | November 24 | Cleveland Cavaliers | | |
| Damyean Dotson (RFA) | November 24 | Cleveland Cavaliers | New York Knicks | |
| Derrick Favors | November 24 | Utah Jazz | New Orleans Pelicans | |
| Bryn Forbes | November 24 | Milwaukee Bucks | San Antonio Spurs | |
| Danilo Gallinari | November 24 | Atlanta Hawks | Oklahoma City Thunder | |
| Marc Gasol | November 24 | Los Angeles Lakers | Toronto Raptors | |
| Willy Hernangómez | November 24 | New Orleans Pelicans | Charlotte Hornets | |
| Jakob Pöltl (RFA) | November 24 | San Antonio Spurs | | |
| Bobby Portis | November 24 | Milwaukee Bucks | New York Knicks | |
| Fred VanVleet | November 24 | Toronto Raptors | | |
| Christian Wood | November 24 | Houston Rockets | Detroit Pistons | |
| D. J. Augustin | November 25 | Milwaukee Bucks | Orlando Magic | |
| Malik Beasley (RFA) | November 25 | Minnesota Timberwolves | | |
| DeAndre' Bembry (RFA) | November 25 | Toronto Raptors | Atlanta Hawks | |
| Chris Boucher (RFA) | November 25 | Toronto Raptors | | |
| Sterling Brown (RFA) | November 25 | Houston Rockets | Milwaukee Bucks | |
| Bruno Caboclo | November 25 | Houston Rockets | | |
| Torrey Craig (RFA) | November 25 | Milwaukee Bucks | Denver Nuggets | |
| Paul Eboua | November 25 | Miami Heat | Stella Azzura (Italy) | |
| James Ennis III | November 25 | Orlando Magic | | |
| Solomon Hill | November 25 | Atlanta Hawks | Miami Heat | |
| Serge Ibaka | November 25 | Los Angeles Clippers | Toronto Raptors | |
| Alex Len | November 25 | Toronto Raptors | Sacramento Kings | |
| Marcus Morris | November 25 | Los Angeles Clippers | | |
| Nerlens Noel | November 25 | New York Knicks | Oklahoma City Thunder | |
| Patrick Patterson | November 25 | Los Angeles Clippers | | |
| Austin Rivers | November 25 | New York Knicks | Houston Rockets | |
| Jae'Sean Tate | November 25 | Houston Rockets | Sydney Kings (Australia) | |
| Jake Toolson | November 25 | Utah Jazz | BYU (Undrafted in 2020) | |
| Breein Tyree | November 25 | Miami Heat | Ole Miss (Undrafted in 2020) | |
| Henry Ellenson | November 26 | Toronto Raptors | Raptors 905 (G League) | |
| Justin Anderson | November 27 | Philadelphia 76ers | Brooklyn Nets (Substitute Player contract) | |
| Ryan Broekhoff | November 27 | Philadelphia 76ers (previously on Substitute Player contract) | | |
| Devin Cannady | November 27 | Orlando Magic | Long Island Nets (G League) | |
| Yoeli Childs | November 27 | Washington Wizards | BYU (Undrafted in 2020) | |
| Malik Fitts | November 27 | Los Angeles Clippers | Saint Mary's (Undrafted in 2020) | |
| Jordan Ford | November 27 | Los Angeles Clippers | Saint Mary's (Undrafted in 2020) | |
| Robert Franks | November 27 | Orlando Magic | Stockton Kings (G League) | |
| Juan Hernangómez (RFA) | November 27 | Minnesota Timberwolves | | |
| Caleb Homesley | November 27 | Washington Wizards | Liberty (Undrafted in 2020) | |
| Tyler Johnson | November 27 | Brooklyn Nets | | |
| Charles Matthews | November 27 | Cleveland Cavaliers | Michigan (Undrafted in 2019) | |
| Chimezie Metu | November 27 | Sacramento Kings | San Antonio Spurs (Waived on November 20) | |
| Zach Norvell Jr. | November 27 | Chicago Bulls | Santa Cruz Warriors (G League) | |
| Marlon Taylor | November 27 | Washington Wizards | LSU (Undrafted in 2020) | |
| Garrett Temple** | November 27 | Chicago Bulls | Brooklyn Nets | |
| Jon Teske | November 27 | Orlando Magic | Michigan (Undrafted in 2020) | |
| Noah Vonleh | November 27 | Chicago Bulls | Denver Nuggets | |
| Derrick Walton | November 27 | Philadelphia 76ers | Detroit Pistons | |
| Yuta Watanabe**** (RFA) | November 27 | Toronto Raptors | Memphis Grizzlies | |
| Hassan Whiteside | November 27 | Sacramento Kings | Portland Trail Blazers | |
| Marques Bolden | November 28 | Cleveland Cavaliers | Canton Charge (G League) | |
| Oshae Brissett**** (RFA) | November 28 | Toronto Raptors | | |
| Jae Crowder | November 28 | Phoenix Suns | Miami Heat | |
| Kris Dunn | November 28 | Atlanta Hawks | Chicago Bulls | |
| Langston Galloway | November 28 | Phoenix Suns | Detroit Pistons | |
| Udonis Haslem | November 28 | Miami Heat | | |
| Brandon Ingram (RFA) | November 28 | New Orleans Pelicans | | |
| DaQuan Jeffries**** (RFA) | November 28 | Sacramento Kings | | |
| Alize Johnson (RFA) | November 28 | Toronto Raptors | Indiana Pacers | |
| Damian Jones (RFA) | November 28 | Phoenix Suns | Atlanta Hawks | |
| Michael Kidd-Gilchrist | November 28 | New York Knicks | Dallas Mavericks | |
| Thon Maker | November 28 | Cleveland Cavaliers | Detroit Pistons | |
| E'Twaun Moore | November 28 | Phoenix Suns | New Orleans Pelicans | |
| Dario Šarić (RFA) | November 28 | Phoenix Suns | | |
| Jahlil Tripp | November 28 | Memphis Grizzlies | Pacific (Undrafted in 2020) | |
| Amida Brimah | November 29 | Indiana Pacers (Previously waived on October 16, 2019) | | |
| Tyler Cook | November 29 | Minnesota Timberwolves | Denver Nuggets (Substitute Player contract) | |
| Rayshaun Hammonds | November 29 | Indiana Pacers | Georgia (Undrafted in 2020) | |
| Gordon Hayward | November 29 | Charlotte Hornets | Boston Celtics | |
| Kelan Martin**** (Note: Became unrestricted free agent after qualifying offer was withdrawn.) | November 29 | Indiana Pacers | Minnesota Timberwolves | |
| Naz Mitrou-Long**** (RFA) | November 29 | Indiana Pacers | | |
| Johnathan Motley**** (RFA) | November 29 | Phoenix Suns | Los Angeles Clippers | |
| Elfrid Payton | November 29 | New York Knicks (Previously waived on November 19) | | |
| Myles Powell | November 29 | New York Knicks | Seton Hall (Undrafted in 2020) | |
| Cameron Reynolds**** (RFA) | November 29 | San Antonio Spurs | Milwaukee Bucks | |
| JaKarr Sampson | November 29 | Indiana Pacers | | |
| Dwayne Sutton | November 29 | Golden State Warriors | Louisville (Undrafted in 2020) | |
| Bismack Biyombo | November 30 | Charlotte Hornets | | |
| Ky Bowman | November 30 | Los Angeles Clippers | Golden State Warriors (Waived on November 20) | |
| Facundo Campazzo | November 30 | Denver Nuggets | Real Madrid (Spain) | |
| Keandre Cook | November 30 | Charlotte Hornets | Missouri State (Undrafted in 2020) | |
| DeMarcus Cousins | November 30 | Houston Rockets | Los Angeles Lakers | |
| Javin DeLaurier | November 30 | Charlotte Hornets | Duke (Undrafted in 2020) | |
| Lamine Diane | November 30 | Philadelphia 76ers | Cal State Northridge (Undrafted in 2020) | |
| Wenyen Gabriel (RFA) | November 30 | New Orleans Pelicans | Portland Trail Blazers | |
| Anthony Gill | November 30 | Washington Wizards | Khimki (Russia) | |
| Romaro Gill | November 30 | Utah Jazz | Seton Hall (Undrafted in 2020) | |
| Jerian Grant | November 30 | Houston Rockets | Washington Wizards (Substitute Player contract) | |
| Gerald Green | November 30 | Houston Rockets | | |
| JaMychal Green* | November 30 | Denver Nuggets | Los Angeles Clippers | |
| Isaiah Hartenstein | November 30 | Denver Nuggets | Houston Rockets (Waived on June 23) | |
| Frank Kaminsky** | November 30 | Sacramento Kings | Phoenix Suns | |
| E. J. Montgomery | November 30 | Milwaukee Bucks | Kentucky (Undrafted in 2020) | |
| Justin Patton | November 30 | Milwaukee Bucks | Los Angeles Clippers (Waived on November 25) | |
| Trevelin Queen | November 30 | Houston Rockets | New Mexico State (Undrafted in 2020) | |
| Xavier Sneed | November 30 | Charlotte Hornets | Kansas State (Undrafted in 2020) | |
| Nik Stauskas | November 30 | Milwaukee Bucks | TD Systems Baskonia (Spain) | |
| Max Strus**** (RFA) | November 30 | Miami Heat | Chicago Bulls | |
| Jeff Teague | November 30 | Boston Celtics | Atlanta Hawks | |
| Brodric Thomas | November 30 | Houston Rockets | Truman State (Undrafted in 2020) | |
| Tristan Thompson | November 30 | Boston Celtics | Cleveland Cavaliers | |
| Sindarius Thornwell | November 30 | New Orleans Pelicans (previously on Substitute Player contract) | | |
| Axel Toupane | November 30 | Golden State Warriors | SIG Strasbourg (France) | |
| Kaleb Wesson | November 30 | Golden State Warriors | Ohio State (Undrafted in 2020) | |
| Kahlil Whitney | November 30 | Charlotte Hornets | Kentucky (Undrafted in 2020) | |
| Ike Anigbogu | December 1 | New Orleans Pelicans | Indiana Pacers | |
| J. J. Barea | December 1 | Dallas Mavericks | | |
| Nicolas Batum | December 1 | Los Angeles Clippers | Charlotte Hornets (Waived on November 29) | |
| Jordan Bowden | December 1 | Brooklyn Nets | Tennessee (Undrafted in 2020) | |
| Trey Burke | December 1 | Dallas Mavericks (previously on Substitute Player contract) | | |
| Willie Cauley-Stein* | December 1 | Dallas Mavericks | | |
| Chris Chiozza**** (RFA) | December 1 | Brooklyn Nets | | |
| Jared Dudley | December 1 | Los Angeles Lakers | | |
| Wayne Ellington | December 1 | Detroit Pistons | New York Knicks (Waived on November 19) | |
| Freddie Gillespie | December 1 | Dallas Mavericks | Baylor (Undrafted in 2020) | |
| Treveon Graham | December 1 | Milwaukee Bucks | Atlanta Hawks | |
| Wes Iwundu (RFA) | December 1 | Dallas Mavericks | Orlando Magic | |
| Josh Jackson | December 1 | Detroit Pistons | Memphis Grizzlies | |
| Reggie Jackson | December 1 | Los Angeles Clippers | | |
| Jahlil Okafor | December 1 | Detroit Pistons | New Orleans Pelicans | |
| Devonte Patterson | December 1 | Dallas Mavericks | Prairie View A&M (Undrafted in 2020) | |
| Mason Plumlee | December 1 | Detroit Pistons | Denver Nuggets | |
| Levi Randolph | December 1 | Cleveland Cavaliers | Canton Charge (G League) | |
| Nate Sestina | December 1 | Brooklyn Nets | Kentucky (Undrafted in 2020) | |
| Rayjon Tucker | December 1 | Los Angeles Clippers | Cleveland Cavaliers (Waived on November 28) | |
| Jarrod Uthoff | December 1 | New Orleans Pelicans | Washington Wizards (Substitute Player contract) | |
| LiAngelo Ball | December 2 | Detroit Pistons | Oklahoma City Blue (G League) | |
| Antonius Cleveland**** (RFA) | December 2 | Oklahoma City Thunder | Dallas Mavericks (Waived on December 3) | |
| Anthony Lamb | December 2 | Detroit Pistons | Vermont (Undrafted in 2020) | |
| Paul Millsap | December 2 | Denver Nuggets | | |
| Ade Murkey | December 2 | Minnesota Timberwolves | Denver (Undrafted in 2020) | |
| Glenn Robinson III | December 2 | Sacramento Kings | Philadelphia 76ers | |
| Anthony Davis* | December 3 | Los Angeles Lakers | | |
| Melvin Frazier** | December 3 | Oklahoma City Thunder | Orlando Magic | |
| Rondae Hollis-Jefferson | December 3 | Minnesota Timberwolves | Toronto Raptors | |
| Rawle Alkins | December 4 | New Orleans Pelicans | Porto (Portugal) | |
| Quinn Cook | December 4 | Los Angeles Lakers (Previously waived on November 19) | | |
| Frank Jackson (RFA) | December 4 | Oklahoma City Thunder | New Orleans Pelicans | |
| Amile Jefferson | December 4 | Boston Celtics | Orlando Magic | |
| B. J. Johnson**** (RFA) | December 4 | Miami Heat | Orlando Magic | |
| Jaylen Hoard | December 5 | Oklahoma City Thunder | Portland Trail Blazers (Substitute Player contract) | |
| Justin Robinson | December 6 | Philadelphia 76ers | Delaware Blue Coats (G League) | |
| Simisola Shittu | December 6 | Chicago Bulls | Windy City Bulls (G League) | |
| Ömer Yurtseven | December 7 | Oklahoma City Thunder | Georgetown (Undrafted in 2020) | |
| Quinton Rose | December 8 | Sacramento Kings | Temple (Undrafted in 2020) | |
| Shaquille Harrison | December 9 | Utah Jazz | Chicago Bulls | |
| Skal Labissière | December 9 | New York Knicks | Atlanta Hawks | |
| Trevon Bluiett | December 10 | Utah Jazz | Salt Lake City Stars (G League) | |
| Charlie Brown Jr.**** (RFA) | December 10 | Minnesota Timberwolves | Atlanta Hawks | |
| Kylor Kelley | December 10 | San Antonio Spurs | Oregon State (Undrafted in 2020) | |
| Courtney Lee | December 10 | Dallas Mavericks | | |
| Ahmad Caver | December 11 | Memphis Grizzlies | Memphis Hustle (G League) | |
| Zavier Simpson | December 11 | Los Angeles Lakers | Michigan (Undrafted in 2020) | |
| Khyri Thomas | December 11 | San Antonio Spurs | Atlanta Hawks (Waived on November 20) | |
| Andrew White | December 11 | New York Knicks | Westchester Knicks (G League) | |
| Tyler Hall | December 12 | New York Knicks | Westchester Knicks (G League) | |
| Kevon Harris | December 12 | Los Angeles Lakers | Stephen F. Austin (Undrafted in 2020) | |
| Tres Tinkle | December 12 | Los Angeles Lakers | Oregon State (Undrafted in 2020) | |
| James Young | December 14 | New York Knicks | Maccabi Haifa (Israel) | |
| Bennie Boatwright | December 15 | Memphis Grizzlies | Memphis Hustle (G League) | |
| Trevon Scott | December 15 | Utah Jazz | Leones de Ponce (Puerto Rico) | |
| Zhaire Smith | December 15 | Memphis Grizzlies | Detroit Pistons (Waived on November 30) | |
| Shaq Buchanan | December 16 | Memphis Grizzlies | Memphis Hustle (G League) | |
| Vincent Edwards | December 16 | Sacramento Kings | Canton Charge (G League) | |
| Kaiser Gates | December 16 | Brooklyn Nets | Maine Red Claws (G League) | |
| Louis King | December 16 | New York Knicks | Detroit Pistons (Waived on December 14) | |
| Elie Okobo | December 16 | Brooklyn Nets | Phoenix Suns (Waived on November 23) | |
| Christian Vital | December 16 | Memphis Grizzlies | BG Göttingen (Germany) | |
| Bryce Brown | December 17 | New York Knicks | Maine Red Claws (G League) | |
| Trey Mourning | December 17 | Houston Rockets | Sioux Falls Skyforce (G League) | |
| Jordan Bell | December 18 | Washington Wizards | Los Angeles Lakers (Waived on November 24) | |
| Zylan Cheatham | December 18 | Minnesota Timberwolves | Oklahoma City Thunder (Waived on December 2) | |
| Paul Eboua | December 18 | Brooklyn Nets (claimed off waivers) | Miami Heat (Waived on December 18) | |
| Yogi Ferrell | December 18 | Utah Jazz | Sacramento Kings | |
| Josh Gray | December 18 | Indiana Pacers | Oklahoma City Thunder (Waived on December 1) | |
| Frank Mason III**** | December 18 | Philadelphia 76ers | Milwaukee Bucks | |
| Malcolm Miller | December 18 | Utah Jazz | Toronto Raptors | |
| London Perrantes | December 18 | San Antonio Spurs | Capital City Go-Go (G League) | |
| Devin Robinson | December 18 | Indiana Pacers | Raptors 905 (G League) | |
| Jeff Dowtin | December 19 | Orlando Magic | Rhode Island (Undrafted in 2020) | |
| Dewan Hernandez | December 19 | Toronto Raptors (Waived on November 26) | | |
| Norvel Pelle | December 19 | Cleveland Cavaliers | Philadelphia 76ers (Waived on November 21) | |
| Eli Pemberton | December 19 | Golden State Warriors | Hofstra (Undrafted in 2020) | |
| Chasson Randle | December 19 | Oklahoma City Thunder | Golden State Warriors | |
| Josh Reaves**** | December 19 | Houston Rockets | Dallas Mavericks | |
| Tres Tinkle | December 19 | Toronto Raptors | Los Angeles Lakers (Waived on December 13) | |
| Breein Tyree | December 19 | Toronto Raptors | Miami Heat (Waived on December 16) | |
| Paul Watson Jr.**** | December 19 | Toronto Raptors (Previously on two-way contract) | | |
| Justin Wright-Foreman | December 19 | New Orleans Pelicans | Utah Jazz | |
| Frank Kaminsky | December 21 | Phoenix Suns (claimed off waivers) | Sacramento Kings (Waived on December 20) | |
| Tim Frazier | January 4 | Memphis Grizzlies (10-day contract) | Detroit Pistons (Waived on February 6) | |
| Taj Gibson | January 7 | New York Knicks (Previously waived on November 19) | | |
| Yogi Ferrell | January 11 | Cleveland Cavaliers (10-day contract) | Utah Jazz (Waived on December 19) | |
| Jordan Bell | January 23 | Washington Wizards (Signed to 10-day contract) | Erie BayHawks (G League) | |
| Alex Len | January 23 | Washington Wizards | Toronto Raptors (Waived on January 19) | |
| Norvel Pelle | January 28 | Brooklyn Nets (Signed for rest of season) | Canton Charge (G League) | |
| Iman Shumpert | January 30 | Brooklyn Nets (Previously waived on December 12, 2019) | | |
| Noah Vonleh | February 8 | Brooklyn Nets (Signed for rest of season) | Chicago Bulls (Waived on December 14) | |
| André Roberson | February 16 | Brooklyn Nets (Signed for rest of season) | Oklahoma City Thunder | |
| Tyler Cook | February 24 | Brooklyn Nets (10-day contract) | Iowa Wolves (G League) | |
| Sindarius Thornwell | February 24 | New Orleans Pelicans (Signed to 10-day contract; previously waived on February 23) | | |
| Norvel Pelle | February 25 | Sacramento Kings (10-day contract) | Canton Charge (G League) | |
| Donta Hall | February 26 | Toronto Raptors (10-day contract) | NBA G League Ignite (G League) | |
| Damian Jones | February 26 | Los Angeles Lakers (10-day contract) | Phoenix Suns (Waived on February 23) | |
| André Roberson | February 26 | Brooklyn Nets (Signed to 10-day contract; previously waived on February 23) | | |
| Iman Shumpert | February 26 | Brooklyn Nets (Signed to 10-day contract; previously waived on February 23) | | |
| Blake Griffin | March 8 | Brooklyn Nets (Signed for rest of season) | Detroit Pistons (Waived on March 5) | |
| Henry Ellenson | March 10 | Toronto Raptors (10-day contract) | Raptors 905 (G League) | |
| Ersan İlyasova | March 10 | Utah Jazz (Signed for rest of season) | Milwaukee Bucks (Waived on November 19) | |
| Sindarius Thornwell | March 10 | New Orleans Pelicans (Second 10-day contract) | | |
| Damian Jones | March 11 | Los Angeles Lakers (Second 10-day contract) | | |
| Mason Jones | March 11 | Houston Rockets (Signed to 10-day contract; previously waived on March 8) | | |
| Quinn Cook | March 12 | Cleveland Cavaliers (10-day contract) | Los Angeles Lakers (Waived on February 24) | |
| Tyler Cook | March 18 | Detroit Pistons (10-day contract) | Brooklyn Nets (Last 10-day contract ended on March 5) | |
| Quinn Cook | March 22 | Cleveland Cavaliers (Second 10-day contract) | | |
| Alize Johnson | March 22 | Brooklyn Nets (10-day contract) | Raptors 905 (G League) | |
| Paul Reed**** | March 26 | Philadelphia 76ers (Previously on two-way contract) | | |
| Cameron Reynolds | March 26 | San Antonio Spurs (10-day contract) | Austin Spurs (G League) | |
| LaMarcus Aldridge | March 28 | Brooklyn Nets (Signed for rest of season) | San Antonio Spurs (Waived on March 25) | |
| Moses Brown**** | March 28 | Oklahoma City Thunder (Previously on two-way contract) | | |
| Tyler Cook | March 28 | Detroit Pistons (Second 10-day contract) | | |
| Andre Drummond | March 28 | Los Angeles Lakers (Signed for rest of season) | Cleveland Cavaliers (Waived on March 26) | |
| Gorgui Dieng | March 29 | San Antonio Spurs (Signed for rest of season) | Memphis Grizzlies (Waived on March 26) | |
| Oshae Brissett | April 1 | Indiana Pacers (10-day contract) | Fort Wayne Mad Ants (G League) | |
| Alize Johnson | April 1 | Brooklyn Nets (Second 10-day contract) | | |
| Jeff Teague | April 1 | Milwaukee Bucks (Signed for rest of season) | Orlando Magic (Waived on March 27) | |
| Norvel Pelle | April 2 | New York Knicks (10-day contract) | Sacramento Kings (Last 10-day contract ended on March 6) | |
| Isaiah Thomas | April 3 | New Orleans Pelicans (10-day contract) | Los Angeles Clippers (Waived on February 8) | |
| DeMarcus Cousins | April 5 | Los Angeles Clippers (10-day contract) | Houston Rockets (Waived on February 23) | |
| John Henson | April 5 | New York Knicks (10-day contract) | Detroit Pistons | |
| DaQuan Jeffries | April 5 | Houston Rockets (Claimed-off waivers) | Sacramento Kings (Waived on April 3) | |
| Justin Robinson | April 5 | Oklahoma City Thunder (10-day contract) | Delaware Blue Coats (G League) | |
| Devin Cannady | April 6 | Orlando Magic (10-day contract) | Lakeland Magic (G League) | |
| Ben McLemore | April 6 | Los Angeles Lakers (Signed for rest of season) | Houston Rockets (Waived on April 3) | |
| Tyler Cook | April 7 | Detroit Pistons (Signed to multi-year contract) | | |
| Damian Jones | April 7 | Sacramento Kings (10-day contract) | Los Angeles Lakers (Last 10-day contract ended on March 21) | |
| Dewayne Dedmon | April 8 | Miami Heat (Signed for rest of season) | Detroit Pistons (Waived on November 24) | |
| Freddie Gillespie | April 8 | Toronto Raptors (10-day contract) | Memphis Hustle (G League) | |
| Rondae Hollis-Jefferson | April 8 | Portland Trail Blazers (10-day contract) | Minnesota Timberwolves (Waived on December 19) | |
| Gary Payton II | April 8 | Golden State Warriors (10-day contract) | Raptors 905 (G League) | |
| Malik Fitts | April 9 | Los Angeles Clippers (10-day contract) | Agua Caliente Clippers (G League) | |
| Khem Birch | April 10 | Toronto Raptors (Signed for rest of season) | Orlando Magic (Waived on April 8) | |
| Gabriel Deck | April 10 | Oklahoma City Thunder | Real Madrid (Spain) | |
| Mfiondu Kabengele | April 10 | Cleveland Cavaliers (10-day contract) | Sacramento Kings (Waived on March 25) | |
| Oshae Brissett | April 11 | Indiana Pacers (Second 10-day contract) | | |
| Alize Johnson | April 11 | Brooklyn Nets (Signed to multi-year contract) | | |
| Robert Franks | April 12 | Orlando Magic (10-day contract) | Lakeland Magic (G League) | |
| Norvel Pelle | April 12 | New York Knicks (Second 10-day contract) | | |
| Anthony Tolliver | April 12 | Philadelphia 76ers (10-day contract) | Memphis Grizzlies | |
| Donta Hall | April 13 | Orlando Magic (10-day contract) | Toronto Raptors (Last 10-day contract ended on March 7) | |
| Jordan Bell | April 14 | Washington Wizards (Second 10-day contract) | Erie BayHawks (G League) | |
| Tim Frazier | April 14 | Memphis Grizzlies (Second 10-day contract; last 10-day contract ended on January 14) | | |
| Lamar Stevens**** | April 14 | Cleveland Cavaliers (Previously on two-way contract) | | |
| Justin Robinson | April 15 | Oklahoma City Thunder (Second 10-day contract) | | |
| DeMarcus Cousins | April 16 | Los Angeles Clippers (Second 10-day contract) | | |
| Jabari Parker | April 16 | Boston Celtics (Signed for rest of season) | Sacramento Kings (Waived on March 25) | |
| Damian Jones | April 17 | Sacramento Kings (Second 10-day contract) | | |
| Freddie Gillespie | April 18 | Toronto Raptors (Second 10-day contract) | | |
| Rondae Hollis-Jefferson | April 18 | Portland Trail Blazers (Second 10-day contract) | | |
| Yuta Watanabe**** | April 18 | Toronto Raptors (Previously on two-way contract) | | |
| Yogi Ferrell | April 19 | Los Angeles Clippers (10-day contract) | Salt Lake City Stars (G League) | |
| Gary Payton II | April 19 | Golden State Warriors (Second 10-day contract) | | |
| Austin Rivers | April 20 | Denver Nuggets (10-day contract) | Oklahoma City Thunder (Waived on March 28) | |
| Oshae Brissett | April 21 | Indiana Pacers (Signed to multi-year contract) | | |
| Mamadi Diakite**** | April 21 | Milwaukee Bucks (Signed to multi-year contract) | | |
| Mfiondu Kabengele | April 21 | Cleveland Cavaliers (Second 10-day contract) | | |
| Robert Franks | April 22 | Orlando Magic (Second 10-day contract) | | |
| Norvel Pelle | April 22 | New York Knicks (Signed to multi-year contract) | | |
| Anthony Tolliver | April 22 | Philadelphia 76ers (Second 10-day contract) | | |
| Donta Hall | April 23 | Orlando Magic (Second 10-day contract) | | |
| Jared Harper**** | April 23 | New York Knicks (10-day contract, previously on two-way contract) | | |
| Mike James | April 23 | Brooklyn Nets (10-day contract) | CSKA Moscow (Russia) | |
| Tim Frazier | April 24 | Memphis Grizzlies (Signed for rest of season) | | |
| Charlie Brown Jr. | April 25 | Oklahoma City Thunder (10-day contract) | Iowa Wolves (G League) | |
| DeMarcus Cousins | April 26 | Los Angeles Clippers (Signed for rest of season) | | |
| Damian Jones | April 27 | Sacramento Kings (Signed to multi-year contract) | | |
| Chimezie Metu**** | April 27 | Sacramento Kings (Signed to multi-year contract, previously on two-way contract) | | |
| Moritz Wagner | April 27 | Orlando Magic (Signed for rest of season) | Boston Celtics (Waived on April 16) | |
| Freddie Gillespie | April 28 | Toronto Raptors (Signed to multi-year contract) | | |
| Rondae Hollis-Jefferson | April 28 | Portland Trail Blazers (Signed for rest of season) | | |
| Yogi Ferrell | April 29 | Los Angeles Clippers (Signed to multi-year contract) | | |
| Austin Rivers | April 30 | Denver Nuggets (Signed for rest of season) | | |
| Mfiondu Kabengele | May 1 | Cleveland Cavaliers (Signed to multi-year contract) | | |
| Ignas Brazdeikis | May 2 | Orlando Magic (10-day contract) | Philadelphia 76ers (Waived on April 8) | |
| Anthony Tolliver | May 2 | Philadelphia 76ers (Signed for rest of season) | | |
| Mike James | May 3 | Brooklyn Nets (Second 10-day contract) | | |
| Anderson Varejão | May 4 | Cleveland Cavaliers (10-day contract) | Flamengo (Brazil) | |
| Charlie Brown Jr. | May 5 | Oklahoma City Thunder (Second 10-day contract) | | |
| Luca Vildoza | May 6 | New York Knicks | TD Systems Baskonia (Spain) | |
| Naji Marshall**** | May 7 | New Orleans Pelicans (Previously on two-way contract) | | |
| Khyri Thomas | May 7 | Houston Rockets (10-day contract) | Austin Spurs (G League) | |
| Donta Hall | May 9 | Orlando Magic (Signed for rest of season; previously waived on May 2) | | |
| Cameron Oliver | May 10 | Houston Rockets (10-day contract) | Cairns Taipans (Australia) | |
| Ignas Brazdeikis | May 12 | Orlando Magic (Signed for rest of season) | | |
| Elijah Bryant | May 13 | Milwaukee Bucks (Signed for rest of season) | Maccabi Playtika Tel Aviv (Israel) | |
| Mike James | May 13 | Brooklyn Nets (Signed for rest of season) | | |
| Juan Toscano-Anderson**** | May 13 | Golden State Warriors (Previously on two-way contract) | | |
| Cameron Reynolds | May 14 | Houston Rockets (10-day contract) | San Antonio Spurs (10-day contract ended on April 4) | |
| Khyri Thomas | May 14 | Houston Rockets (Signed to multi-year contract) | | |
| Anderson Varejão | May 14 | Cleveland Cavaliers (Second 10-day contract) | | |
| Ömer Yurtseven | May 14 | Miami Heat (Signed to multi-year contract) | Oklahoma City Blue (G League) | |
| Charlie Brown Jr. | May 15 | Oklahoma City Thunder (Signed to multi-year contract) | | |
| Caleb Homesley | May 15 | Washington Wizards (Signed to multi-year contract) | Erie BayHawks (G League) | |
| DaQuan Jeffries | May 15 | San Antonio Spurs (Claimed-off waivers) | Houston Rockets (Waived on May 13) | |
| Gary Payton II | May 16 | Golden State Warriors (Signed for rest of season; last 10-day contract ended April 29) | | |
| Justin Anderson | | | Philadelphia 76ers (Waived on December 19) | |
| Ryan Anderson | | | Houston Rockets (Waived on November 18, 2019) | |
| LiAngelo Ball | | | Detroit Pistons (Waived on December 14) | |
| Jonah Bolden | | | Phoenix Suns | |
| Brian Bowen**** | | | Indiana Pacers (Waived on April 23) | |
| Deonte Burton** | | | Oklahoma City Thunder | |
| Devin Cannady**** | | | Orlando Magic (Waived on May 4) | |
| DeMarre Carroll | | | Houston Rockets | |
| Tyson Chandler | | | Houston Rockets | |
| Marquese Chriss | | | San Antonio Spurs (Waived on March 28) | |
| Chris Clemons | | | Houston Rockets (Waived on January 22) | |
| Quinn Cook | | | Cleveland Cavaliers | |
| Allen Crabbe | | | Minnesota Timberwolves (Waived on February 29) | |
| Jamal Crawford | | | Brooklyn Nets (Substitute Player contract) | |
| Troy Daniels | | | Denver Nuggets | |
| Henry Ellenson | | | Toronto Raptors | |
| Terrance Ferguson | | | New York Knicks (Waived on March 28) | |
| Malik Fitts | | | Los Angeles Clippers | |
| Robert Franks | | | Orlando Magic (Waived on April 27) | |
| Gerald Green | | | Houston Rockets (Waived on December 19) | |
| Ashton Hagans**** | | | Minnesota Timberwolves (Waived on February 13) | |
| John Henson | | | New York Knicks | |
| Mason Jones**** | | | Philadelphia 76ers (Waived on May 6) | |
| Michael Kidd-Gilchrist | | | New York Knicks (Waived on December 19) | |
| Brandon Knight | | | Detroit Pistons | |
| Kyle Korver | | | Milwaukee Bucks | |
| Rodions Kurucs | | | Milwaukee Bucks (Waived on May 12) | |
| Jalen Lecque | | | Indiana Pacers (Waived on March 25) | |
| Courtney Lee | | | Dallas Mavericks (Waived on December 19) | |
| Meyers Leonard | | | Oklahoma City Thunder (Waived on March 25) | |
| Ian Mahinmi | | | Washington Wizards | |
| Thon Maker | | | Cleveland Cavaliers (Waived on January 14) | |
| Karim Mané**** | | | Orlando Magic (Waived on April 13) | |
| Dakota Mathias**** | | | Philadelphia 76ers (Waived on January 18) | |
| Luc Mbah a Moute | | | Houston Rockets (Substitute Player contract) | |
| Patrick McCaw | | | Toronto Raptors (Waived on April 9) | |
| C. J. Miles | | | Washington Wizards (Waived on January 12) | |
| Darius Miller | | | Oklahoma City Thunder (Waived on April 8) | |
| Trey Mourning | | | Houston Rockets (Waived on December 19) | |
| Emmanuel Mudiay | | | Utah Jazz | |
| Shabazz Napier | | | Washington Wizards | |
| Nenê | | | Atlanta Hawks (Waived on February 6) | |
| Chandler Parsons | | | Atlanta Hawks (Waived on February 5) | |
| Anžejs Pasečņiks | | | Washington Wizards (Waived on January 17) | |
| Justin Patton**** | | | Houston Rockets (Waived on April 3) | |
| Myles Powell**** | | | New York Knicks (Waived on April 24) | |
| André Roberson | | | Brooklyn Nets | |
| Jerome Robinson | | | Washington Wizards (Waived on April 8) | |
| Justin Robinson | | | Oklahoma City Thunder | |
| Glenn Robinson III | | | Sacramento Kings (Waived on February 24) | |
| Iman Shumpert | | | Brooklyn Nets | |
| Chris Silva | | | Sacramento Kings (Waived on April 27) | |
| J. R. Smith | | | Los Angeles Lakers (Substitute Player contract) | |
| Ray Spalding**** | | | Houston Rockets (Waived on February 16) | |
| Caleb Swanigan | | | Portland Trail Blazers | |
| Isaiah Thomas | | | New Orleans Pelicans | |
| Lance Thomas | | | Brooklyn Nets (Substitute Player contract) | |
| Noah Vonleh | | | Brooklyn Nets (Waived on February 23) | |
| Dion Waiters | | | Los Angeles Lakers | |
| Greg Whittington**** | | | Denver Nuggets (Waived on April 9) | |
| Tyler Zeller | | | San Antonio Spurs (Waived on December 19) | |

* Player option
** Team option
*** Early termination option
**** Previously on a two-way contract

=== Free-agent two-way contracts ===
Per recent NBA rules implemented as of the 2017–18 season, teams are permitted to have two two-way players on their roster at any given time, in addition to their 15-man regular season roster. A two-way player will provide services primarily to the team's G League affiliate, but can spend up to 45 days with the parent NBA team. Only players with four or fewer years of NBA experience are able to sign two-way contracts, which can be for either one season or two. Players entering training camp for a team have a chance to convert their training camp deal into a two-way contract if they prove themselves worthy enough for it. Teams also have the option to convert a two-way contract into a regular, minimum-salary NBA contract, at which point the player becomes a regular member of the parent NBA team. Two-way players are not eligible for NBA playoff rosters, so a team must convert any two-way players it wants to use in the playoffs, waiving another player in the process.

During the shortened 2020–21 season, two-way deals will work a little differently than usual. Rather than being limited to spending 45 days with their NBA teams, two-way players would be eligible to be active for up to 50 of their team's 72 NBA games. And instead of having their salaries by how many days they spend in the NBA, they'll receive flat salaries of $449,155.

| Denotes players who got promoted to the main roster |
| Denotes players who got cut before seasons end |

| Player | Date signed | Team | School / Club team | Ref |
|---|---|---|---|---|
| Devon Dotson | November 21 | Chicago Bulls | Kansas (Undrafted in 2020) | |
| Garrison Mathews (RFA) | November 21 | Washington Wizards | | |
| Gabe Vincent | November 21 | Miami Heat | | |
| Kenny Wooten**** | November 21 | Houston Rockets (claimed off waivers) | New York Knicks (Waived on November 19) | |
| Adam Mokoka**** (RFA) | November 22 | Chicago Bulls | | |
| Ty-Shon Alexander | November 23 | Phoenix Suns | Creighton (Undrafted in 2020) | |
| Mamadi Diakite | November 23 | Milwaukee Bucks | Virginia (Undrafted in 2020) | |
| Tacko Fall**** (RFA) | November 23 | Boston Celtics | | |
| Jared Harper**** (RFA) | November 23 | New York Knicks | | |
| Jay Scrubb | November 23 | Los Angeles Clippers | John A. Logan College | |
| Tremont Waters**** (RFA) | November 23 | Boston Celtics | | |
| Jaylen Adams | November 24 | Milwaukee Bucks | Portland Trail Blazers | |
| Nathan Knight | November 24 | Atlanta Hawks | William & Mary (Undrafted in 2020) | |
| Skylar Mays | November 24 | Atlanta Hawks | LSU | |
| Sean McDermott | November 24 | Memphis Grizzlies | Butler (Undrafted in 2020) | |
| Killian Tillie | November 24 | Memphis Grizzlies | Gonzaga (Undrafted in 2020) | |
| Quinndary Weatherspoon**** (RFA) | November 24 | San Antonio Spurs | | |
| Greg Whittington | November 24 | Denver Nuggets | Galatasaray (Turkey) | |
| Keljin Blevins | November 25 | Portland Trail Blazers | Northern Arizona Suns (G League) | |
| Jarrell Brantley**** (RFA) | November 25 | Utah Jazz | | |
| Trent Forrest | November 25 | Utah Jazz | Florida State (Undrafted in 2020) | |
| Mason Jones | November 25 | Houston Rockets | Arkansas (Undrafted in 2020) | |
| Nico Mannion | November 25 | Golden State Warriors | Arizona | |
| Kostas Antetokounmpo**** (RFA) | November 26 | Los Angeles Lakers | | |
| Jordan Bone | November 27 | Orlando Magic | Detroit Pistons | |
| Brian Bowen (RFA) | November 27 | Indiana Pacers | | |
| Karim Mané | November 27 | Orlando Magic | Vanier College (Undrafted in 2020) | |
| Dakota Mathias | November 27 | Philadelphia 76ers | Texas Legends (G League) | |
| Paul Reed | November 27 | Philadelphia 76ers | DePaul | |
| Cassius Winston | November 27 | Washington Wizards | Michigan State | |
| Ashton Hagans | November 28 | Minnesota Timberwolves | Kentucky (Undrafted in 2020) | |
| Jalen Harris | November 28 | Toronto Raptors | Nevada | |
| Lamar Stevens | November 28 | Cleveland Cavaliers | Penn State (Undrafted in 2020) | |
| Keita Bates-Diop | November 29 | San Antonio Spurs | Denver Nuggets (Waived on November 22) | |
| Theo Pinson | November 29 | New York Knicks | | |
| Cassius Stanley | November 29 | Indiana Pacers | Duke | |
| Tyler Bey | November 30 | Dallas Mavericks | Colorado | |
| Nate Darling | November 30 | Charlotte Hornets | Delaware (Undrafted in 2020) | |
| Markus Howard | November 30 | Denver Nuggets | Marquette (Undrafted in 2020) | |
| Saben Lee | November 30 | Detroit Pistons | Vanderbilt | |
| Will Magnay | November 30 | New Orleans Pelicans | Brisbane Bullets (Australia) | |
| Grant Riller | November 30 | Charlotte Hornets | College of Charleston | |
| Nate Hinton | December 1 | Dallas Mavericks | Houston (Undrafted in 2020) | |
| Louis King**** (RFA) | December 2 | Detroit Pistons | | |
| Naji Marshall | December 7 | New Orleans Pelicans | Xavier (Undrafted in 2020) | |
| Moses Brown | December 8 | Oklahoma City Thunder | Portland Trail Blazers | |
| Josh Hall | December 8 | Oklahoma City Thunder | Moravian Prep High School (Undrafted in 2020) | |
| William McDowell-White | December 17 | Houston Rockets | Rio Grande Valley Vipers (G League) | |
| Jordan McLaughlin**** (RFA) | December 17 | Minnesota Timberwolves | | |
| Max Strus | December 18 | Miami Heat | | |
| Marques Bolden | December 19 | Cleveland Cavaliers | Canton Charge (G League) | |
| Reggie Perry | December 19 | Brooklyn Nets | | |
| Brodric Thomas | December 19 | Houston Rockets | Truman (Undrafted in 2020) | |
| Yuta Watanabe**** | December 19 | Toronto Raptors | Memphis Grizzlies | |
| Juan Toscano-Anderson | December 21 | Golden State Warriors (Previously waived on December 19) | | |
| Chris Chiozza | December 22 | Brooklyn Nets (Previously waived on December 19) | | |
| Chimezie Metu | December 24 | Sacramento Kings (Previously waived on December 22) | | |
| Frank Jackson | December 27 | Detroit Pistons | Oklahoma City Thunder (Waived on December 21) | |
| Rayjon Tucker | January 22 | Philadelphia 76ers | Cleveland Cavaliers (Waived on November 28) | |
| Frank Mason III | February 3 | Orlando Magic | Delaware Blue Coats (G League) | |
| Ray Spalding | February 12 | Houston Rockets | Charlotte Hornets (Waived on November 29) | |
| Chasson Randle | February 15 | Orlando Magic | Oklahoma City Blue (G League) | |
| Justin Patton | February 19 | Houston Rockets | Westchester Knicks (G League) | |
| Brodric Thomas | February 24 | Cleveland Cavaliers | Rio Grande Valley Vipers (G League) | |
| Anthony Lamb | March 8 | Houston Rockets | Rio Grande Valley Vipers (G League) | |
| Axel Toupane | March 14 | Milwaukee Bucks | Santa Cruz Warriors (G League) | |
| Mason Jones | March 26 | Philadelphia 76ers | Houston Rockets (10-day contract ended on March 22) | |
| Armoni Brooks | April 3 | Houston Rockets | Orléans Loiret Basket (France) | |
| Jaylen Hoard | April 5 | Oklahoma City Thunder | Oklahoma City Blue (G League) | |
| Shaquille Harrison | April 9 | Denver Nuggets | Utah Jazz (Waived on February 24) | |
| James Nunnally | April 12 | New Orleans Pelicans | Fenerbahçe Beko (Turkey) | |
| T. J. Leaf | April 13 | Portland Trail Blazers | Oklahoma City Thunder (Waived on December 18) | |
| Devin Cannady | April 16 | Orlando Magic (Previously waived on April 13) | | |
| Justin Jackson | April 21 | Milwaukee Bucks | Oklahoma City Thunder (Waived on April 5) | |
| Amida Brimah | April 23 | Indiana Pacers | Fort Wayne Mad Ants (G League) | |
| Myles Powell | April 23 | New York Knicks | Westchester Knicks (G League) | |
| Jeremiah Martin | April 28 | Cleveland Cavaliers | Long Island Nets (G League) | |
| Louis King | April 30 | Sacramento Kings | Westchester Knicks (G League) | |
| Jared Harper | May 3 | New York Knicks (previously on 10-day contract) | | |
| Sindarius Thornwell | May 4 | Orlando Magic | New Orleans Pelicans (10-day contract ended on March 20) | |
| Gary Clark | May 11 | Philadelphia 76ers | Denver Nuggets (Waived on April 8) | |
| Jordan Bell | May 13 | Golden State Warriors | Washington Wizards (Second 10-day contract ended on April 24) | |

**** Previously on a two-way contract

=== Going to other North American leagues ===
| * | Denotes G-League players who returned to their former team |

| Player | Date signed | New team | New league | NBA team | NBA contract status | Ref |
|---|---|---|---|---|---|---|
| Amir Johnson | November 12 | NBA G League Ignite | NBA G League | Philadelphia 76ers | Unrestricted free agent | |
| Amida Brimah | January 11 | Fort Wayne Mad Ants | NBA G League | Indiana Pacers | Unrestricted free agent | |
| Oshae Brissett | January 11 | Fort Wayne Mad Ants | NBA G League | Toronto Raptors | Unrestricted free agent | |
| Freddie Gillespie | January 11 | Memphis Hustle | NBA G League | Dallas Mavericks | Unrestricted free agent | |
| Josh Gray | January 11 | Fort Wayne Mad Ants | NBA G League | Indiana Pacers | Unrestricted free agent | |
| Rayshaun Hammonds | January 11 | Fort Wayne Mad Ants | NBA G League | Indiana Pacers | Unrestricted free agent | |
| Kevon Harris | January 11 | Raptors 905 | NBA G League | Los Angeles Lakers | Unrestricted free agent | |
| Anthony Lamb | January 11 | Canton Charge | NBA G League | Detroit Pistons | Unrestricted free agent | |
| Naz Mitrou-Long* | January 11 | Fort Wayne Mad Ants | NBA G League | Indiana Pacers | Unrestricted free agent | |
| Justin Patton | January 11 | Westchester Knicks | NBA G League | Milwaukee Bucks | Unrestricted free agent | |
| Gary Payton II | January 11 | Raptors 905 | NBA G League | Washington Wizards | Unrestricted free agent | |
| Devin Robinson | January 11 | Fort Wayne Mad Ants | NBA G League | Indiana Pacers | Unrestricted free agent | |
| Admiral Schofield | January 11 | Greensboro Swarm | NBA G League | Oklahoma City Thunder | Unrestricted free agent | |
| Zavier Simpson | January 11 | Oklahoma City Blue | NBA G League | Los Angeles Lakers | Unrestricted free agent | |
| Allonzo Trier | January 11 | Iowa Wolves | NBA G League | New York Knicks | Unrestricted free agent | |
| Jarrod Uthoff | January 11 | Erie BayHawks | NBA G League | New Orleans Pelicans | Unrestricted free agent | |
| Jordan Bell | January 12 | Erie BayHawks | NBA G League | Washington Wizards | Unrestricted free agent | |
| Yoeli Childs | January 12 | Erie BayHawks | NBA G League | Washington Wizards | Unrestricted free agent | |
| Caleb Homesley | January 12 | Erie BayHawks | NBA G League | Washington Wizards | Unrestricted free agent | |
| Zach Norvell Jr.* | January 12 | Santa Cruz Warriors | NBA G League | Chicago Bulls | Unrestricted free agent | |
| Eli Pemberton | January 12 | Santa Cruz Warriors | NBA G League | Golden State Warriors | Unrestricted free agent | |
| Dwayne Sutton | January 12 | Santa Cruz Warriors | NBA G League | Golden State Warriors | Unrestricted free agent | |
| Marlon Taylor | January 12 | Erie BayHawks | NBA G League | Washington Wizards | Unrestricted free agent | |
| Axel Toupane | January 12 | Santa Cruz Warriors | NBA G League | Golden State Warriors | Unrestricted free agent | |
| Kaleb Wesson | January 12 | Santa Cruz Warriors | NBA G League | Golden State Warriors | Unrestricted free agent | |
| Rawle Alkins | January 13 | Erie BayHawks | NBA G League | New Orleans Pelicans | Unrestricted free agent | |
| Ike Anigbogu* | January 13 | Erie BayHawks | NBA G League | New Orleans Pelicans | Unrestricted free agent | |
| Devin Cannady | January 13 | Lakeland Magic | NBA G League | Orlando Magic | Unrestricted free agent | |
| Tony Carr* | January 13 | Erie BayHawks | NBA G League | New Orleans Pelicans | Unrestricted free agent | |
| Jeff Dowtin | January 13 | Lakeland Magic | NBA G League | Orlando Magic | Unrestricted free agent | |
| Robert Franks | January 13 | Lakeland Magic | NBA G League | Orlando Magic | Unrestricted free agent | |
| Jon Teske | January 13 | Lakeland Magic | NBA G League | Orlando Magic | Unrestricted free agent | |
| Justin Wright-Foreman | January 13 | Erie BayHawks | NBA G League | New Orleans Pelicans | Unrestricted free agent | |
| Lamine Diane | January 14 | Delaware Blue Coats | NBA G League | Philadelphia 76ers | Unrestricted free agent | |
| Michael Frazier II | January 14 | Delaware Blue Coats | NBA G League | Houston Rockets | Unrestricted free agent | |
| Donta Hall | January 14 | NBA G League Ignite | NBA G League | Brooklyn Nets | Unrestricted free agent | |
| Frank Mason III | January 14 | Delaware Blue Coats | NBA G League | Philadelphia 76ers | Unrestricted free agent | |
| Justin Robinson | January 14 | Delaware Blue Coats | NBA G League | Philadelphia 76ers | Unrestricted free agent | |
| William McDowell-White* | January 18 | Rio Grande Valley Vipers | NBA G League | Houston Rockets | Unrestricted free agent | |
| Trevelin Queen | January 18 | Rio Grande Valley Vipers | NBA G League | Houston Rockets | Unrestricted free agent | |
| Josh Reaves | January 18 | Rio Grande Valley Vipers | NBA G League | Houston Rockets | Unrestricted free agent | |
| Ray Spalding | January 18 | Rio Grande Valley Vipers | NBA G League | Charlotte Hornets | Restricted free agent | |
| Kenny Wooten | January 18 | Rio Grande Valley Vipers | NBA G League | Houston Rockets | Unrestricted free agent | |
| Bryce Brown | January 21 | Westchester Knicks | NBA G League | New York Knicks | Unrestricted free agent | |
| Tyler Hall* | January 21 | Westchester Knicks | NBA G League | New York Knicks | Unrestricted free agent | |
| Louis King | January 21 | Westchester Knicks | NBA G League | New York Knicks | Unrestricted free agent | |
| Skal Labissière | January 21 | Westchester Knicks | NBA G League | New York Knicks | Unrestricted free agent | |
| Myles Powell | January 21 | Westchester Knicks | NBA G League | New York Knicks | Unrestricted free agent | |
| Simisola Shittu | January 21 | Westchester Knicks | NBA G League | Chicago Bulls | Unrestricted free agent | |
| Andrew White* | January 21 | Westchester Knicks | NBA G League | New York Knicks | Unrestricted free agent | |
| James Young | January 21 | Westchester Knicks | NBA G League | New York Knicks | Unrestricted free agent | |
| Charles Matthews | January 22 | Canton Charge | NBA G League | Cleveland Cavaliers | Unrestricted free agent | |
| Norvel Pelle* | January 22 | Canton Charge | NBA G League | Cleveland Cavaliers | Unrestricted free agent | |
| Sir'Dominic Pointer* | January 22 | Canton Charge | NBA G League | Cleveland Cavaliers | Unrestricted free agent | |
| Levi Randolph* | January 22 | Canton Charge | NBA G League | Cleveland Cavaliers | Unrestricted free agent | |
| Charlie Brown Jr. | January 25 | Iowa Wolves | NBA G League | Minnesota Timberwolves | Unrestricted free agent | |
| Zylan Cheatham | January 25 | Iowa Wolves | NBA G League | Minnesota Timberwolves | Unrestricted free agent | |
| Tyler Cook | January 25 | Iowa Wolves | NBA G League | Minnesota Timberwolves | Unrestricted free agent | |
| Ade Murkey | January 25 | Iowa Wolves | NBA G League | Minnesota Timberwolves | Unrestricted free agent | |
| Trevon Bluiett* | January 26 | Salt Lake City Stars | NBA G League | Utah Jazz | Unrestricted free agent | |
| Bennie Boatwright* | January 26 | Memphis Hustle | NBA G League | Memphis Grizzlies | Unrestricted free agent | |
| Shaq Buchanan* | January 26 | Memphis Hustle | NBA G League | Memphis Grizzlies | Unrestricted free agent | |
| Ahmad Caver* | January 26 | Memphis Hustle | NBA G League | Memphis Grizzlies | Unrestricted free agent | |
| Jacob Evans | January 26 | Erie BayHawks | NBA G League | New York Knicks | Unrestricted free agent | |
| Yogi Ferrell | January 26 | Salt Lake City Stars | NBA G League | Cleveland Cavaliers | Unrestricted free agent | |
| Romaro Gill | January 26 | Salt Lake City Stars | NBA G League | Utah Jazz | Unrestricted free agent | |
| Malcolm Miller | January 26 | Salt Lake City Stars | NBA G League | Utah Jazz | Unrestricted free agent | |
| Trevon Scott | January 26 | Salt Lake City Stars | NBA G League | Utah Jazz | Unrestricted free agent | |
| Zhaire Smith | January 26 | Memphis Hustle | NBA G League | Memphis Grizzlies | Unrestricted free agent | |
| Omari Spellman | January 26 | Erie BayHawks | NBA G League | New York Knicks | Unrestricted free agent | |
| Jake Toolson | January 26 | Salt Lake City Stars | NBA G League | Utah Jazz | Unrestricted free agent | |
| Jahlil Tripp | January 26 | Memphis Hustle | NBA G League | Memphis Grizzlies | Unrestricted free agent | |
| Christian Vital | January 26 | Memphis Hustle | NBA G League | Memphis Grizzlies | Unrestricted free agent | |
| Jordan Bowden | January 27 | Long Island Nets | NBA G League | Brooklyn Nets | Unrestricted free agent | |
| Keandre Cook | January 27 | Greensboro Swarm | NBA G League | Charlotte Hornets | Unrestricted free agent | |
| Javin DeLaurier | January 27 | Greensboro Swarm | NBA G League | Charlotte Hornets | Unrestricted free agent | |
| Paul Eboua | January 27 | Long Island Nets | NBA G League | Brooklyn Nets | Unrestricted free agent | |
| Henry Ellenson* | January 27 | Raptors 905 | NBA G League | Toronto Raptors | Unrestricted free agent | |
| Kaiser Gates | January 27 | Long Island Nets | NBA G League | Brooklyn Nets | Unrestricted free agent | |
| Dewan Hernandez | January 27 | Raptors 905 | NBA G League | Toronto Raptors | Unrestricted free agent | |
| Alize Johnson | January 27 | Raptors 905 | NBA G League | Toronto Raptors | Unrestricted free agent | |
| B. J. Johnson | January 27 | Long Island Nets | NBA G League | Miami Heat | Unrestricted free agent | |
| Jeremiah Martin* | January 27 | Long Island Nets | NBA G League | Brooklyn Nets | Unrestricted free agent | |
| Matt Mooney | January 27 | Raptors 905 | NBA G League | Cleveland Cavaliers | Unrestricted free agent | |
| Élie Okobo | January 27 | Long Island Nets | NBA G League | Brooklyn Nets | Unrestricted free agent | |
| Tariq Owens | January 27 | Long Island Nets | NBA G League | Phoenix Suns | Unrestricted free agent | |
| Nate Sestina | January 27 | Long Island Nets | NBA G League | Brooklyn Nets | Unrestricted free agent | |
| Kobi Simmons | January 27 | Greensboro Swarm | NBA G League | Charlotte Hornets | Unrestricted free agent | |
| Xavier Sneed | January 27 | Greensboro Swarm | NBA G League | Charlotte Hornets | Unrestricted free agent | |
| Nik Stauskas | January 27 | Raptors 905 | NBA G League | Milwaukee Bucks | Unrestricted free agent | |
| Tres Tinkle | January 27 | Raptors 905 | NBA G League | Toronto Raptors | Unrestricted free agent | |
| Breein Tyree | January 27 | Raptors 905 | NBA G League | Toronto Raptors | Unrestricted free agent | |
| Kahlil Whitney | January 27 | Greensboro Swarm | NBA G League | Charlotte Hornets | Unrestricted free agent | |
| Antonius Cleveland | January 28 | Oklahoma City Blue | NBA G League | Oklahoma City Thunder | Unrestricted free agent | |
| Vincent Edwards | January 28 | Oklahoma City Blue | NBA G League | Sacramento Kings | Unrestricted free agent | |
| Melvin Frazier | January 28 | Oklahoma City Blue | NBA G League | Oklahoma City Thunder | Unrestricted free agent | |
| Jaylen Hoard | January 28 | Oklahoma City Blue | NBA G League | Oklahoma City Thunder | Unrestricted free agent | |
| Vít Krejčí | January 28 | Oklahoma City Blue | NBA G League | Oklahoma City Thunder | Unsigned 2020 draft pick | |
| Chasson Randle | January 28 | Oklahoma City Blue | NBA G League | Oklahoma City Thunder | Unrestricted free agent | |
| Ömer Yurtseven | January 28 | Oklahoma City Blue | NBA G League | Oklahoma City Thunder | Unrestricted free agent | |
| Kylor Kelley | January 29 | Austin Spurs | NBA G League | San Antonio Spurs | Unrestricted free agent | |
| London Perrantes | January 29 | Austin Spurs | NBA G League | San Antonio Spurs | Unrestricted free agent | |
| Cameron Reynolds | January 29 | Austin Spurs | NBA G League | San Antonio Spurs | Unrestricted free agent | |
| Khyri Thomas | January 29 | Austin Spurs | NBA G League | San Antonio Spurs | Unrestricted free agent | |
| Jordan Bell | January 30 | Erie BayHawks | NBA G League | Washington Wizards | Unrestricted free agent | |
| Ky Bowman | January 31 | Agua Caliente Clippers | NBA G League | Los Angeles Clippers | Unrestricted free agent | |
| Malik Fitts | January 31 | Agua Caliente Clippers | NBA G League | Los Angeles Clippers | Unrestricted free agent | |
| Jordan Ford | January 31 | Agua Caliente Clippers | NBA G League | Los Angeles Clippers | Unrestricted free agent | |
| Jordan Bone | February 6 | Delaware Blue Coats | NBA G League | Orlando Magic | Unrestricted free agent | |
| Brodric Thomas* | February 14 | Rio Grande Valley Vipers | NBA G League | Houston Rockets | Unrestricted free agent | |
| Frank Mason III* | February 18 | Delaware Blue Coats | NBA G League | Orlando Magic | Unrestricted free agent | |
| Norvel Pelle* | February 21 | Canton Charge | NBA G League | Brooklyn Nets | Unrestricted free agent | |
| Marques Bolden* | February 26 | Canton Charge | NBA G League | Cleveland Cavaliers | Unrestricted free agent | |
| Festus Ezeli | March 2 | Westchester Knicks | NBA G League | Portland Trail Blazers | Unrestricted free agent | |
| Quinton Rose | March 4 | Westchester Knicks | NBA G League | Sacramento Kings | Unrestricted free agent | |

=== Going overseas ===
| Denotes international players who returned to their home country |

| Player | Date signed | New team | New country | NBA team | NBA contract status | Ref |
|---|---|---|---|---|---|---|
| Ante Žižić | June 30 | Maccabi Playtika Tel Aviv | Israel | Cleveland Cavaliers | Unrestricted free agent | |
| William Howard* | July 16 | LDLC ASVEL | France | Houston Rockets | Restricted free agent | |
| Johnathan Williams | September 7 | Galatasaray | Turkey | Washington Wizards | Restricted free agent | |
| Wilson Chandler | September 8 | Zhejiang Lions | China | Brooklyn Nets | Unrestricted free agent | |
| Kevin Hervey | September 22 | Lokomotiv Kuban | Russia | Oklahoma City Thunder | Restricted free agent | |
| Dragan Bender | September 23 | Maccabi Playtika Tel Aviv | Israel | Golden State Warriors | Unrestricted free agent | |
| Devon Hall | October 29 | Brose Bamberg | Germany | Oklahoma City Thunder | Unrestricted free agent | |
| Marco Belinelli* | November 26 | Segafredo Virtus Bologna | Italy | San Antonio Spurs | Unrestricted free agent | |
| Kyle Alexander | December 3 | Urbas Fuenlabrada | Spain | Miami Heat | Restricted free agent | |
| Vic Law | December 5 | Brisbane Bullets | Australia | Orlando Magic | Restricted free agent | |
| Marko Gudurić | December 18 | Fenerbahçe Beko | Turkey | Memphis Grizzlies | Unrestricted free agent | |
| Derrick Walton | December 19 | LDLC ASVEL | France | Philadelphia 76ers | Unrestricted free agent | |
| Jordan McRae | December 23 | Beijing Ducks | China | Detroit Pistons | Unrestricted free agent | |
| Amile Jefferson | December 29 | Galatasaray | Turkey | Boston Celtics | Unrestricted free agent | |
| Nigel Williams-Goss | December 29 | Lokomotiv Kuban | Russia | Utah Jazz | Unrestricted free agent | |
| Nick Young | December 29 | Zhejiang Guangsha Lions | China | Denver Nuggets | Unrestricted free agent | |
| Jerian Grant | December 31 | Promitheas Patras | Greece | Houston Rockets | Unrestricted free agent | |
| E. J. Montgomery | January 5 | Nevėžis-OPTIBET | Lithuania | Milwaukee Bucks | Unrestricted free agent | |
| Marial Shayok | January 5 | Frutti Extra Bursaspor | Turkey | Philadelphia 76ers | Unrestricted free agent | |
| Džanan Musa | January 13 | Anadolu Efes | Turkey | Detroit Pistons | Unrestricted free agent | |
| Kyle O'Quinn | January 20 | Fenerbahçe Beko | Turkey | Philadelphia 76ers | Unrestricted free agent | |
| J. J. Barea | January 23 | Movistar Estudiantes | Spain | Dallas Mavericks | Unrestricted free agent | |
| Cheick Diallo | February 2 | Avtodor Saratov | Russia | Phoenix Suns | Unrestricted free agent | |
| Ryan Broekhoff* | February 15 | South East Melbourne Phoenix | Australia | Philadelphia 76ers | Unrestricted free agent | |
| Pau Gasol* | February 21 | FC Barcelona Bàsquet | Spain | Portland Trail Blazers | Unrestricted free agent | |
| Mario Hezonja | February 23 | Panathinaikos | Greece | Memphis Grizzlies | Unrestricted free agent | |
| Shamorie Ponds | February 23 | Spars Sarajevo | Bosnia and Herzegovina | Toronto Raptors | Unrestricted free agent | |
| Johnathan Motley | February 28 | Incheon ET Land Elephants | South Korea | Phoenix Suns | Unrestricted free agent | |
| Bruno Caboclo | March 26 | Limoges CSP | France | Houston Rockets | Unrestricted free agent | |
| Vincent Poirier | April 10 | Real Madrid | Spain | New York Knicks | Unrestricted free agent | |
| Will Magnay* | May 6 | Perth Wildcats | Australia | New Orleans Pelicans | Unrestricted free agent | |

=== Waived ===
| Denotes player who did not clear waivers because his contract was claimed by another team |

| Player | Date Waived | Former Team | Ref |
|---|---|---|---|
| Quinn Cook | November 19 | Los Angeles Lakers | |
| Wayne Ellington | November 19 | New York Knicks | |
| Taj Gibson | November 19 | New York Knicks | |
| Ersan İlyasova | November 19 | Milwaukee Bucks | |
| Elfrid Payton | November 19 | New York Knicks | |
| Kenny Wooten^{†} | November 19 | New York Knicks | |
| Ky Bowman | November 20 | Golden State Warriors | |
| Chimezie Metu | November 20 | San Antonio Spurs | |
| Norvel Pelle | November 20 | Philadelphia 76ers | |
| Marial Shayok | November 20 | Philadelphia 76ers | |
| Khyri Thomas | November 20 | Atlanta Hawks | |
| Keita Bates-Diop | November 22 | Denver Nuggets | |
| Elie Okobo | November 23 | Phoenix Suns | |
| Dewayne Dedmon | November 24 | Detroit Pistons | |
| Jordan Bell | November 25 | Los Angeles Lakers | |
| Justin Patton | November 25 | Los Angeles Clippers | |
| Dewan Hernandez | November 26 | Toronto Raptors | |
| Rayjon Tucker | November 28 | Cleveland Cavaliers | |
| Nicolas Batum | November 29 | Charlotte Hornets | |
| Ray Spalding^{†} | November 29 | Charlotte Hornets | |
| Zhaire Smith | November 30 | Detroit Pistons | |
| Paul Eboua^{†} | December 18 | Miami Heat | |
| Frank Kaminsky | December 19 | Sacramento Kings | |
| Omari Spellman | January 7 | New York Knicks | |
| Bruno Caboclo | January 14 | Houston Rockets | |
| Yogi Ferrell | January 14 | Cleveland Cavaliers | |
| Thon Maker | January 14 | Cleveland Cavaliers | |
| Anžejs Pasečņiks | January 17 | Washington Wizards | |
| Dakota Mathias^{†} | January 18 | Philadelphia 76ers | |
| Alex Len | January 19 | Toronto Raptors | |
| Chris Clemons | January 22 | Houston Rockets | |
| Jordan Bell | January 30 | Washington Wizards | |
| Jordan Bone^{†} | February 3 | Orlando Magic | |
| Brodric Thomas^{†} | February 12 | Houston Rockets | |
| Ashton Hagans^{†} | February 13 | Minnesota Timberwolves | |
| Frank Mason III^{†} | February 15 | Orlando Magic | |
| Norvel Pelle | February 16 | Brooklyn Nets | |
| Ray Spalding^{†} | February 16 | Houston Rockets | |
| Sindarius Thornwell | February 22 | New Orleans Pelicans | |
| DeMarcus Cousins | February 23 | Houston Rockets | |
| Damian Jones | February 23 | Phoenix Suns | |
| André Roberson | February 23 | Brooklyn Nets | |
| Iman Shumpert | February 23 | Brooklyn Nets | |
| Noah Vonleh | February 23 | Brooklyn Nets | |
| Marques Bolden^{†} | February 24 | Cleveland Cavaliers | |
| Quinn Cook | February 24 | Los Angeles Lakers | |
| Shaquille Harrison | February 24 | Utah Jazz | |
| Glenn Robinson III | February 24 | Sacramento Kings | |
| Jaylen Adams^{†} | March 4 | Milwaukee Bucks | |
| Blake Griffin | March 5 | Detroit Pistons | |
| Mason Jones^{†} | March 8 | Houston Rockets | |
| LaMarcus Aldridge | March 25 | San Antonio Spurs | |
| Mfiondu Kabengele | March 25 | Sacramento Kings | |
| Jalen Lecque | March 25 | Indiana Pacers | |
| Meyers Leonard | March 25 | Oklahoma City Thunder | |
| Jabari Parker | March 25 | Sacramento Kings | |
| Gorgui Dieng | March 26 | Memphis Grizzlies | |
| Andre Drummond | March 26 | Cleveland Cavaliers | |
| Jeff Teague | March 27 | Orlando Magic | |
| Marquese Chriss | March 28 | San Antonio Spurs | |
| Terrance Ferguson | March 28 | New York Knicks | |
| Vincent Poirier | March 28 | New York Knicks | |
| Austin Rivers | March 28 | Oklahoma City Thunder | |
| DaQuan Jeffries | April 3 | Sacramento Kings | |
| Ben McLemore | April 3 | Houston Rockets | |
| Justin Patton^{†} | April 3 | Houston Rockets | |
| Justin Jackson | April 5 | Oklahoma City Thunder | |
| Khem Birch | April 8 | Orlando Magic | |
| Ignas Brazdeikis | April 8 | Philadelphia 76ers | |
| Gary Clark | April 8 | Denver Nuggets | |
| Darius Miller | April 8 | Oklahoma City Thunder | |
| Jerome Robinson | April 8 | Washington Wizards | |
| Patrick McCaw | April 9 | Toronto Raptors | |
| Greg Whittington^{†} | April 9 | Denver Nuggets | |
| Will Magnay^{†} | April 12 | New Orleans Pelicans | |
| Devin Cannady | April 13 | Orlando Magic | |
| Karim Mané^{†} | April 13 | Orlando Magic | |
| Moritz Wagner | April 16 | Boston Celtics | |
| LaMarcus Aldridge | April 23 | San Antonio Spurs | |
| Brian Bowen^{†} | April 23 | Indiana Pacers | |
| Myles Powell^{†} | April 24 | New York Knicks | |
| Robert Franks | April 27 | Orlando Magic | |
| Chris Silva | April 27 | Sacramento Kings | |
| Donta Hall | May 2 | Orlando Magic | |
| Devin Cannady^{†} | May 4 | Orlando Magic | |
| Mason Jones^{†} | May 6 | Philadelphia 76ers | |
| Rodions Kurucs | May 12 | Milwaukee Bucks | |
| DaQuan Jeffries | May 13 | Houston Rockets | |
| Khyri Thomas | May 13 | Houston Rockets | |

- † Two-way contract

==== Training camp cuts ====
All players listed did not make the final roster.

| Atlanta Hawks | Boston Celtics | Brooklyn Nets | Charlotte Hornets | Chicago Bulls |
|---|---|---|---|---|
| | Amile Jefferson | Jordan Bowden; Chris Chiozza; Paul Eboua; Élie Okobo; Nate Sestina; Kaiser Gates; Jeremiah Martin | Keandre Cook; Javin DeLaurier; Xavier Sneed; Kahlil Whitney | Zach Norvell Jr.; Simisola Shittu; Noah Vonleh |
| Cleveland Cavaliers | Dallas Mavericks | Denver Nuggets | Detroit Pistons | Golden State Warriors |
| Charles Matthews; Matt Mooney; Norvel Pelle; Levi Randolph | J. J. Barea; Freddie Gillespie; Courtney Lee; Devonte Patterson | | Anthony Lamb; LiAngelo Ball; Louis King; Džanan Musa | Eli Pemberton; Dwayne Sutton; Juan Toscano-Anderson; Axel Toupane; Kaleb Wesson |
| Houston Rockets | Indiana Pacers | Los Angeles Clippers | Los Angeles Lakers | Memphis Grizzlies |
| Jerian Grant; Gerald Green; William McDowell-White; Trey Mourning; Trevelin Queen; Josh Reaves; Kenny Wooten | Amida Brimah; Josh Gray; Rayshaun Hammonds; Naz Mitrou-Long; Devin Robinson | Ky Bowman; Malik Fitts; Jordan Ford; Joakim Noah; Rayjon Tucker | Kevon Harris; Zavier Simpson; Tres Tinkle | Bennie Boatwright; Shaq Buchanan; Ahmad Caver; Marko Gudurić; Mario Hezonja; Zhaire Smith; Jahlil Tripp; Christian Vital |
| Miami Heat | Milwaukee Bucks | Minnesota Timberwolves | New Orleans Pelicans | New York Knicks |
| Breein Tyree; Paul Eboua; B. J. Johnson | Treveon Graham; E. J. Montgomery; Justin Patton; Nik Stauskas | Charlie Brown Jr.; Zylan Cheatham; Tyler Cook; Rondae Hollis-Jefferson; Ade Murkey | Rawle Alkins; Ike Anigbogu; Tony Carr; Jarrod Uthoff; Justin Wright-Foreman | Bryce Brown; Jacob Evans; Tyler Hall; Michael Kidd-Gilchrist; Louis King; Skal Labissière; James Young; Myles Powell; Andrew White |
| Oklahoma City Thunder | Orlando Magic | Philadelphia 76ers | Phoenix Suns | Portland Trail Blazers |
| Zylan Cheatham; Antonius Cleveland; Melvin Frazier; Josh Gray; Jaylen Hoard; Frank Jackson; T. J. Leaf; Chasson Randle; Admiral Schofield; Ömer Yurtseven | Devin Cannady; Jeff Dowtin; Robert Franks; Jon Teske | Justin Anderson; Ryan Broekhoff; Lamine Diane; Frank Mason III; Justin Robinson; Derrick Walton | Johnathan Motley | |
| Sacramento Kings | San Antonio Spurs | Toronto Raptors | Utah Jazz | Washington Wizards |
| Vincent Edwards; Frank Kaminsky; Quinton Rose; Chimezie Metu | Kylor Kelley; London Perrantes; Cameron Reynolds; Khyri Thomas; Tyler Zeller | Oshae Brissett; Henry Ellenson; Dewan Hernandez; Alize Johnson; Tres Tinkle; Breein Tyree | Trevon Bluiett; Yogi Ferrell; Romaro Gill; Malcolm Miller; Trevon Scott; Jake Toolson; Nigel Williams-Goss | Jordan Bell; Yoeli Childs; Caleb Homesley; Marlon Taylor |

== Draft ==
=== First round ===
| Pick | Player | Date signed | Team | Ref |
|---|---|---|---|---|
| 1 | Anthony Edwards | November 29 | Minnesota Timberwolves | |
| 2 | James Wiseman | November 26 | Golden State Warriors | |
| 3 | LaMelo Ball | November 30 | Charlotte Hornets | |
| 4 | Patrick Williams | November 21 | Chicago Bulls | |
| 5 | Isaac Okoro | November 21 | Cleveland Cavaliers | |
| 6 | Onyeka Okongwu | November 24 | Atlanta Hawks | |
| 7 | Killian Hayes | November 30 | Detroit Pistons | |
| 8 | Obi Toppin | November 23 | New York Knicks | |
| 9 | Deni Avdija | December 1 | Washington Wizards | |
| 10 | Jalen Smith | November 24 | Phoenix Suns | |
| 11 | Devin Vassell | November 27 | San Antonio Spurs | |
| 12 | Tyrese Haliburton | November 26 | Sacramento Kings | |
| 13 | Kira Lewis Jr. | November 30 | New Orleans Pelicans | |
| 14 | Aaron Nesmith | November 24 | Boston Celtics | |
| 15 | Cole Anthony | November 21 | Orlando Magic | |
| 16 | Isaiah Stewart | November 30 | Portland Trail Blazers (traded to Detroit via Houston) | |
| 17 | Aleksej Pokuševski | December 1 | Minnesota Timberwolves (traded to Oklahoma City) | |
| 18 | Josh Green | November 30 | Dallas Mavericks | |
| 19 | Saddiq Bey | November 30 | Brooklyn Nets (traded to Detroit) | |
| 20 | Precious Achiuwa | November 25 | Miami Heat | |
| 21 | Tyrese Maxey | December 2 | Philadelphia 76ers | |
| 22 | Zeke Nnaji | November 30 | Denver Nuggets | |
| 23 | Leandro Bolmaro | — | New York Knicks (traded to Minnesota) | |
| 24 | R. J. Hampton | November 30 | Milwaukee Bucks (traded to Denver Nuggets) | |
| 25 | Immanuel Quickley | November 28 | Oklahoma City Thunder (traded to New York) | |
| 26 | Payton Pritchard | November 24 | Boston Celtics | |
| 27 | Udoka Azubuike | November 24 | Utah Jazz | |
| 28 | Jaden McDaniels | November 29 | Los Angeles Lakers (traded to Minnesota via Oklahoma City) | |
| 29 | Malachi Flynn | November 26 | Toronto Raptors | |
| 30 | Desmond Bane | November 25 | Boston Celtics (traded to Memphis) | |

=== Second round ===
| Pick | Player | Date signed | Team | Ref |
|---|---|---|---|---|
| 31 | Tyrell Terry | December 1 | Dallas Mavericks | |
| 32 | Vernon Carey | November 30 | Charlotte Hornets | |
| 33 | Daniel Oturu | November 27 | Minnesota Timberwolves (traded to Los Angeles Clippers) | |
| 34 | Théo Maledon | December 9 | Philadelphia 76ers (traded to Oklahoma) | |
| 35 | Xavier Tillman Sr. | December 1 | Sacramento Kings (traded to Memphis) | |
| 36 | Tyler Bey^{****} | November 30 | Philadelphia 76ers (traded to Dallas) | |
| 37 | Vít Krejčí | — | Washington Wizards (traded to Oklahoma) | |
| 38 | Saben Lee^{****} | November 30 | Utah Jazz (traded to Detroit) | |
| 39 | Elijah Hughes | November 24 | New Orleans Pelicans (traded to Utah) | |
| 40 | Robert Woodard | November 30 | Memphis Grizzlies (traded to Sacramento) | |
| 41 | Tre Jones | November 27 | San Antonio Spurs | |
| 42 | Nick Richards | November 30 | New Orleans Pelicans (traded to Charlotte) | |
| 43 | Jahmi'us Ramsey | December 3 | Sacramento Kings | |
| 44 | Marko Simonović | — | Chicago Bulls | |
| 45 | Jordan Nwora | November 23 | Milwaukee Bucks | |
| 46 | C.J. Elleby | November 22 | Portland Trail Blazers | |
| 47 | Yam Madar | — | Boston Celtics | |
| 48 | Nico Mannion^{****} | November 25 | Golden State Warriors | |
| 49 | Isaiah Joe | November 27 | Philadelphia 76ers | |
| 50 | Skylar Mays^{****} | November 24 | Atlanta Hawks | |
| 51 | Justinian Jessup | — | Golden State Warriors | |
| 52 | Kenyon Martin Jr. | November 30 | Sacramento Kings (traded to Houston) | |
| 53 | Cassius Winston^{****} | November 27 | Oklahoma City Thunder (traded to Washington) | |
| 54 | Cassius Stanley^{****} | November 29 | Indiana Pacers | |
| 55 | Jay Scrubb^{****} | November 23 | Brooklyn Nets (traded to Los Angeles Clippers) | |
| 56 | Grant Riller^{****} | November 30 | Charlotte Hornets | |
| 57 | Reggie Perry^{****} | November 27 | Los Angeles Clippers (traded to Brooklyn) | |
| 58 | Paul Reed^{****} | November 27 | Philadelphia 76ers | |
| 59 | Jalen Harris^{****} | November 28 | Toronto Raptors | |
| 60 | Sam Merrill | November 30 | New Orleans Pelicans (traded to Milwaukee) | |

**** Signed two-way contract

=== Previous years' draftees ===
| Draft | Pick | Player | Date signed | Team | Previous team | Ref |
|---|---|---|---|---|---|---|
| 2019 | 16 | Chuma Okeke | November 16 | Orlando Magic | Lakeland Magic (G League) | |
| 2019 | 35 | Didi Louzada | April 27 | New Orleans Pelicans | Sydney Kings (Australia) | |
| 2019 | 37 | Deividas Sirvydis | December 1 | Detroit Pistons | Hapoel Jerusalem (Israel) | |
| 2018 | 51 | Tony Carr^{*} | December 1 | New Orleans Pelicans | Erie BayHawks (G League) | |

* Signed Exhibit 10 Deal
