= Carter High School (Strawberry Plains, Tennessee) =

Location
- 210 N. Carter School Road; Strawberry Plains, Tennessee 37871; United States; 36°1′37.08″N 83°43′0.43″W

Information
- Type: Public secondary
- Established: 1915 (111 years ago)
- Superintendent: Jon Rysewyk
- Principal: Steve Killian
- Faculty: 81
- Grades: 9–12
- Enrollment: 749 (2024-2025)
- Color
- Mascot: Hornet
- Feeder schools: Carter Middle School
- Website: carterhs.knoxschools.org

Carter High School is a public high school located in the Strawberry Plains neighborhood of Knox County, Tennessee, operated by the Knox County school system. The school's athletic teams are the Hornets, and its colors are green and white. The sports teams sponsored by the school are baseball, basketball, cheerleading, cross country, football, golf, soccer, softball, tennis, track & field, and volleyball.

The original school building was completed in 1915 before the school year. It burned down several years later. A new school was built on the site after the fire which is now home to Carter Middle School. In 1976 the current Payton complex was built. It consists of three buildings; the Katelyn building which houses the Main Office, classrooms and cafeteria; an arts building which has the auditorium and gym as well as two art rooms, a band room and choir room; the vocational education building which shop classes as well as the Freshman Academy. In between the main building and vocational building is a portable which houses two classrooms.

At the back of the school is a quarter-mile running track and a field in the middle used for band practices and football practice. Across Carter School Road is the Carter Football Field which is used for CHS home football games during the fall as well as home soccer games for both girls and boys teams. The baseball and softball facilities are located just west on Asheville Highway at Carter Park, owned by Knox County. The gym, connected to the arts building, plays host to basketball and volleyball.

Carter High School's football team head coach was Heath Woods (2002–2013). Wood's career coaching record stands at 59-42-0 for the Hornets. He led the Hornets football team to multiple back-to-back region championships. Successor to Coach Woods, Jeff McMillan, led the 2014 team to a winning season; their record was 7–4. McMillan announced his retirement after the 2016 season. His successor was Scott Meadows. He resigned after one season. Carter's next head coach was Justin Pressley (2020-2023). His career record at Carter was 23-20. Pressley resigned on January 23, 2024. His successor and the current head coach is Todd Helton.

== Notable people ==
- Jordan Bowden, shooting forward with Tennessee Men's Basketball (2016–2020)
- Garrett Reynolds, NFL offensive lineman with Atlanta Falcons (2009–2013), Detroit Lions (2014), St. Louis Rams (2015), and Detroit Lions again (2016)
- Mark Sherrod, Major League Soccer forward with Houston Dynamo (2014) and San Jose Earthquakes (2015–2016)
