= Jahlil Tripp =

American basketball player (born 1997)

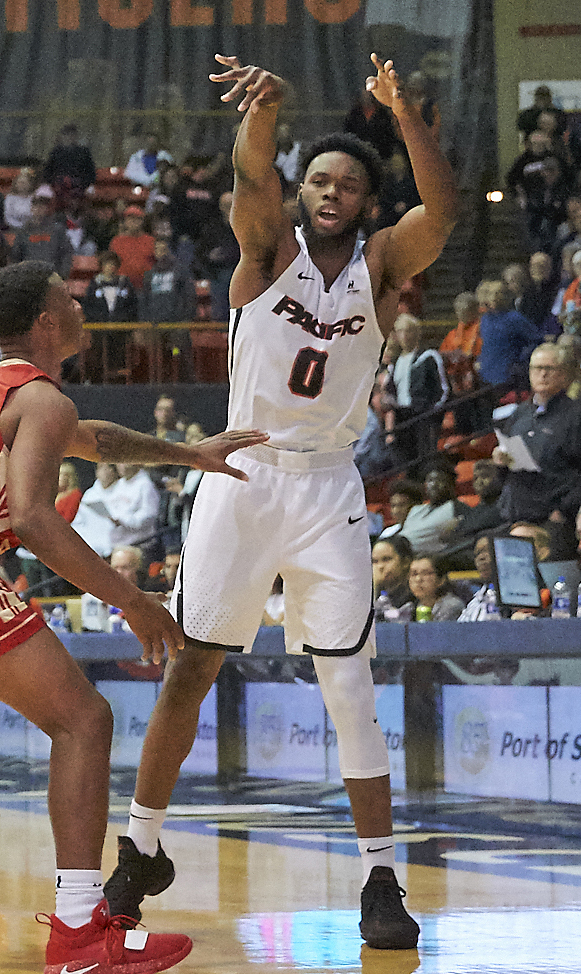
- Tripp with Pacific in 2018

Personal information
- Born: September 22, 1997 (age 29) Brooklyn, NY
- Listed height: 6 ft 5 in (1.96 m)
- Listed weight: 215 lb (98 kg)

Career information
- High school: Brooklyn Collegiate (Brooklyn, New York); Abraham Lincoln (Brooklyn, New York)
- College: South Plains (2016–2017); Pacific (2017–2020)
- NBA draft: 2020: undrafted
- Playing career: 2021–present
- Position: Small forward

Career history
- 2021: Memphis Hustle
- 2021: Maine Celtics
- 2021–2022: College Park Skyhawks
- 2022–2023: Tapiolan Honka
- 2023: BBC Etzella
- 2023–2024: Tenuun Olziy Metal
- 2024: Rayos de Hermosillo
- 2024–2025: Ulaanbaatar TLG

Career highlights
- First-team All-WCC (2020); Second-team All-WCC (2018); WCC Defensive Player of the Year (2020); All-WJCAC Team (2017)
- Stats at NBA.com
- Stats at Basketball Reference

Jahlil Tripp (born September 22, 1997) is an American professional basketball player for the Ulaanbaatar TLG of The League. He played college basketball for the South Plains Texans and the Pacific Tigers.

== High school career ==
Tripp played basketball for Brooklyn Collegiate High School in Brooklyn, New York. On December 4, 2013, while returning home from a girls basketball game with his teammates, he was hit in his calf by a stray bullet. He underwent surgery and was able to continue playing in under one month. Two games after his return, Tripp broke his left leg, underwent surgery again and missed the rest of his junior season. As a senior, he transferred to Abraham Lincoln High School in Brooklyn, averaging 17 points and 11 rebounds per game. Tripp's request for a fifth year of eligibility, due to his injuries during his junior season, was denied by the Public Schools Athletic League. Shortly before his graduation, he committed to play college basketball for Rutgers but reopened his recruitment after a coaching change. However, he did not receive more NCAA Division I offers, as it was late in the recruiting process, and decided to play for South Plains College, whose coach Steve Green knew one of Tripp's former high school coaches.

== College career ==
As a freshman, Tripp was the starting power forward for South Plains College. His team, which was the highest ranked junior college team in the country, was modeled after the 2016–17 Golden State Warriors, with Tripp playing the role of the Warriors' Draymond Green. He averaged 11.4 points, 6.7 rebounds and 2.2 assists per game and was named to the All-Western Junior College Athletic Conference Team. Tripp was recruited to Pacific by head coach Damon Stoudamire, who spotted him while scouting his South Plains teammate Roberto Gallinat. As a sophomore at Pacific, Tripp sometimes played the point guard position, even though he usually played small forward. On November 18, 2017, he set season-highs of 24 points and 15 rebounds in an 89–74 loss to Nevada. In his sophomore season, Tripp averaged 10.9 points, 7.8 rebounds, 4.5 assists and 1.5 steals per game and was named to the Second Team All-West Coast Conference (WCC).

As a junior, he was Pacific's only player to start in all 32 games. He averaged 10.6 points, 5.7 rebounds, three assists and 1.6 steals per game and was an All-WCC Honorable Mention selection. On January 4, 2020, Tripp scored a career-high 39 points and grabbed 11 rebounds in a 107–99 quadruple overtime win over Saint Mary's. He reached 1,000 career points against Santa Clara on January 18, 2020, finishing with 28 points in a 84–80 loss. As a senior, Tripp averaged 16.2 points, 8.9 rebounds, two assists and 1.5 steals per game, earning First Team All-WCC and WCC Defensive Player of the Year honors. He led the WCC in double-doubles, registering 11, and total rebounds. Tripp received the Pacific Athletics Four Pillars Award, which is given annually to a student-athlete who exemplifies the four core identities of family, balance, winning spirit and innovation.

== Professional career ==
=== Memphis Hustle (2020–2021) ===
After going unselected in the 2020 NBA draft, Tripp was signed by the Memphis Grizzlies to an Exhibit 10 deal. He was waived at the conclusion of training camp and subsequently added to the Grizzlies' NBA G League affiliate the Memphis Hustle.

After signing an Exhibit 10 contract with the Grizzlies back in November 2020, Tripp became the first Pacific Tigers to reach the professional ranks of the NBA since Michael Olowakandi was drafted number one overall by the Los Angeles Clippers in 1998.

On October 23, 2021, Tripp re-signed with the Hustle. He was waived on November 3, as part of the final roster cuts.

=== Maine Celtics (2021) ===
On December 19, 2021, Tripp signed with the Maine Celtics. However, he was waived three days later, after two appearances.

=== College Park Skyhawks (2021–2022) ===
On December 22, 2021, Tripp was claimed off waivers by the College Park Skyhawks. Tripp was then later waived on February 28, 2022.

=== Tapiolan Honka (2022-2023) ===
In November 2022, Tripp signed with Tapiolan Honka of Koripallon I-divisioona. He played in 21 games and averaged 17.2 points, 4.4 rebounds and 3.1 assists.

=== BBC Etzella Ettelbruck (2023) ===
On September 17, 2023, Tripp signed with BBC Etzella in Luxembourg. However, he was released after one game.

=== Tenuun Oziy Metal Ulaanbaatar (2023-2024) ===
In November 2023, Tripp joined the Mongolian club Tenuun Olziy Metal.

=== Rayos de Hermosillo (2024) ===
In April 2024, he signed with the Rayos de Hermosillo of the Circuito de Baloncesto de la Costa del Pacífico (CIBACOPA) in Mexico.

=== Ulaanbaatar TLG (2024–present) ===
In November 2024, Tripp joined the Ulaanbaatar TLG of The League.

== Career statistics ==
Legend
GP	Games played	GS	Games started	MPG	Minutes per game
FG%	Field goal percentage	3P%	3-point field goal percentage	FT%	Free throw percentage
RPG	Rebounds per game	APG	Assists per game	SPG	Steals per game
BPG	Blocks per game	PPG	Points per game	**Bold**	Career high

=== College ===
==== NCAA Division I ====
Year	Team	GP	GS	MPG	FG%	3P%	FT%	RPG	APG	SPG	BPG	PPG
2017–18	Pacific	32	31	**35.1**	.445	.315	.656	7.8	**4.5**	1.5	**.2**	10.9
2018–19	Pacific	32	32	29.6	.506	**.316**	.694	5.7	3.0	**1.6**	.1	10.6
2019–20	Pacific	**33**	**33**	30.7	**.512**	.156	**.712**	**8.9**	2.0	1.5	.1	**16.2**
Career		97	96	31.8	.489	.269	.692	7.5	3.2	1.5	.1	12.6

==== JUCO ====
Year	Team	GP	GS	MPG	FG%	3P%	FT%	RPG	APG	SPG	BPG	PPG
2016–17	South Plains	34	30	18.4	.540	.333	.598	6.7	2.2	1.1	.1	11.4
