= Jordan Bowden =

American basketball player (born 1997)

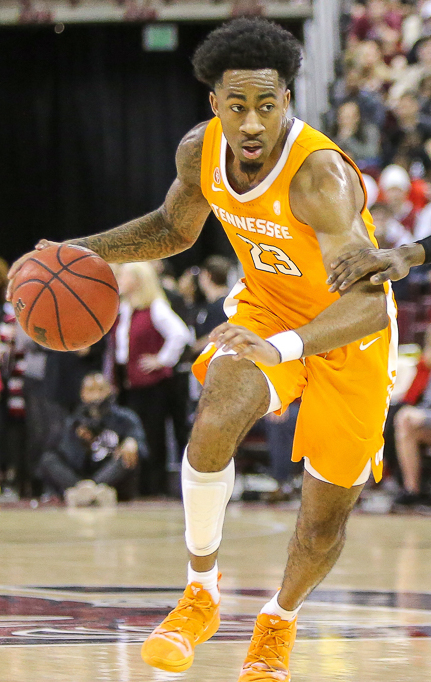
- Bowden with Tennessee in 2020

No. 8 – Memphis Hustle
- Position: Shooting guard
- League: NBA G League

Personal information
- Born: January 20, 1997 (age 29) Knoxville, Tennessee, U.S.
- Listed height: 6 ft 5 in (1.96 m)
- Listed weight: 193 lb (88 kg)

Career information
- High school: Carter (Strawberry Plains, Tennessee); 22 Feet Academy (Greenville, South Carolina)
- College: Tennessee (2016–2020)
- NBA draft: 2020: undrafted
- Playing career: 2020–present

Career history
- 2021–2023: Long Island Nets
- 2023–2024: SLUC Nancy
- 2024: Maine Celtics
- 2024: College Park Skyhawks
- 2024: Montreal Alliance
- 2024: NBA G League United
- 2024–2025: College Park Skyhawks
- 2025: Pallacanestro Cantù
- 2025–2026: Rostock Seawolves
- 2026–present: Memphis Hustle
- Stats at NBA.com
- Stats at Basketball Reference

Jordan Maliek Bowden (born January 20, 1997) is an American professional basketball player for the Memphis Hustle of the NBA G League. He played college basketball for the Tennessee Volunteers.

== High school career ==
Bowden played high school basketball for Carter High School in Strawberry Plains, Tennessee and was coached by Joby Boydstone. As a senior he averaged 26.6 points, 8.9 rebounds and 4.2 assists per game, shooting 55 percent from the field. Bowden earned All-State and District 3-AA MVP recognition, and was named the Knoxville News Sentinel’s 2015 PrepXtra Boys Basketball Player of the Year. Bowden transferred to 22 Feet Academy for a season of prep basketball and drew major-college attention after scoring 30 points at the Tarkanian Classic in December 2015. He averaged 17 points, 6.8 rebounds, and 4.2 assists per game. Ranked the No. 186 prospect in his class by 247Sports, Bowden signed with Tennessee on March 22, 2016, choosing the Volunteers over offers from Providence, Cincinnati, Marquette, and Utah.

== College career ==
Bowden averaged 7.9 points and 2.9 rebounds per game as a freshman. He increased his scoring 9.1 points and rebounding to 3.6 rebounds per game as a sophomore. Bowden scored in double figures in 15 games as a sophomore. He was Tennessee's fifth-leading scorer as a junior with 10.6 points per game and was second on the team in three-point shots made with 51. Bowden drew attention on social media with his dance breaks. He scored a season-high 26 points against Murray State in an 82–63 victory, then scored 18 points the following game in a 75–62 win over Washington. For these performances Bowden was named SEC Player of the Week on November 18, 2019. He had 16 points in a win over Alabama State on November 20 and surpassed the 1,000 point threshold. On February 22, 2020, Bowden scored a career-high 28 points and had six assists in a 73–66 loss to Auburn. As a senior, Bowden averaged 13.7 points, 4.0 rebounds, and 2.7 assists per game.

== Professional career ==
=== Long Island Nets (2021–2023) ===
After going undrafted in the 2020 NBA draft, Bowden signed an Exhibit 10 contract with the Brooklyn Nets on December 1, 2020. He was waived by the Nets on December 11. He was then added to the roster of the Nets' NBA G League affiliate, the Long Island Nets. He made his debut for the team in their season opener on February 10, 2021; scoring 4 points and grabbing 1 rebound in 8 minutes of action. On March 5, Bowden scored 20 points and had 11 rebounds in a win against the Memphis Hustle.

On October 11, 2021, Bowden signed with the Brooklyn Nets, but was waived at the end of training camp on October 15. Ten days later, Bowden was included in the training camp roster of the Long Island Nets.

=== SLUC Nancy (2023–2024) ===
On July 16, 2023, Bowden signed with SLUC Nancy of the LNB Pro A. He averaged 9.3 points, 2.7 rebounds, and 1.7 assists per game. On January 17, 2024, Bowden parted ways with the team.

=== Maine Celtics (2024) ===
On January 23, 2024, Bowden joined the Maine Celtics.

=== College Park Skyhawks (2024) ===
On February 12, 2024, Bowden was traded to the College Park Skyhawks in exchange for a 2025 first-round pick.

=== Montreal Alliance (2024) ===
On May 10, 2024, Bowden signed with the Montreal Alliance of the Canadian Elite Basketball League.

=== Return to College Park (2024/2025) ===
On September 25, 2024, Bowden signed with the Atlanta Hawks, but was waived two days later. On October 26, he re-joined the College Park Skyhawks.

=== Saskatchewan Rattlers (2025) ===
On May 28, 2025, Bowden signed with the Saskatchewan Rattlers of the Canadian Elite Basketball League.On July 5, 2025, Bowden scored a career-high 40 points in a 93-90 win over the Ottawa BlackJacks. In the game Bowden went 9-of-14 from beyond the arc, to set a new Rattlers franchise record for made three-pointers in a single game.

=== Pallacanestro Cantù (2025) ===
On July 16, 2025, he signed with Pallacanestro Cantù of the Italian Lega Basket Serie A (LBA).

=== Rostock Seawolves (2025–2026) ===
On December 16, 2025, he signed with Rostock Seawolves of the German Basketball Bundesliga (BBL).

=== Memphis Hustle (2026–present) ===
On September 29, 2026, the Memphis Hustle acquired the returning player rights to Bowden.

== Career statistics ==
Legend
GP	Games played	GS	Games started	MPG	Minutes per game
FG%	Field goal percentage	3P%	3-point field goal percentage	FT%	Free throw percentage
RPG	Rebounds per game	APG	Assists per game	SPG	Steals per game
BPG	Blocks per game	PPG	Points per game	**Bold**	Career high

=== College ===
Year	Team	GP	GS	MPG	FG%	3P%	FT%	RPG	APG	SPG	BPG	PPG
2016–17	Tennessee	30	27	22.8	.371	.315	**.841**	2.9	1.3	.9	.2	7.9
2017–18	Tennessee	35	**35**	27.9	.394	**.395**	.737	3.6	1.9	**1.1**	**.3**	9.1
2018–19	Tennessee	**36**	5	27.8	**.459**	.378	.817	3.5	1.9	.9	**.3**	10.6
2019–20	Tennessee	31	31	**34.4**	.383	.287	.822	**4.0**	**2.7**	1.0	**.3**	**13.7**
Career		132	98	28.3	.403	.341	.802	3.5	2.0	1.0	.3	10.3
