= Brodric Thomas =

American basketball player (born 1997)

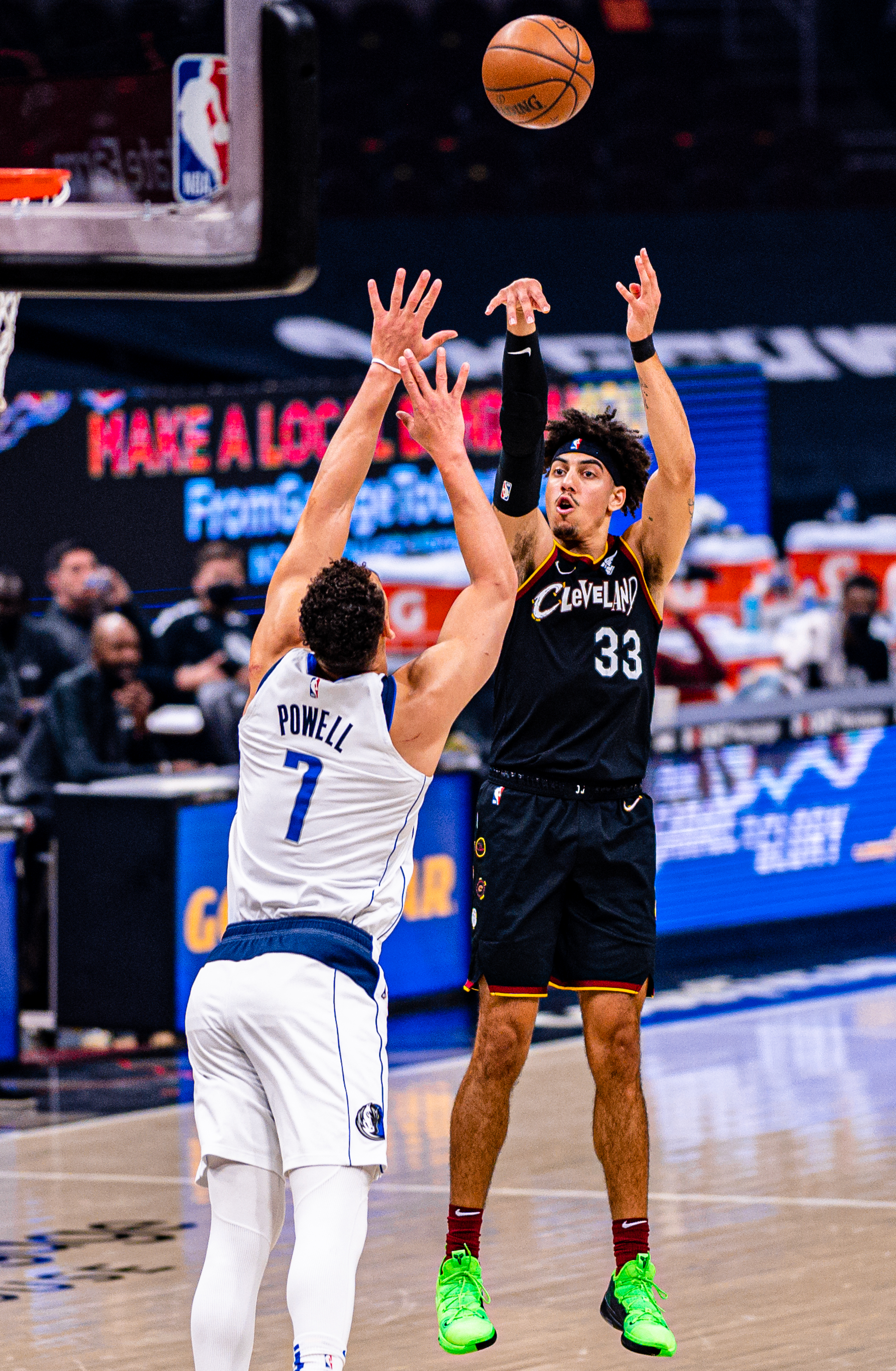
- Thomas with the Cleveland Cavaliers in 2021

Free agent
- Position: Shooting guard

Personal information
- Born: January 28, 1997 (age 29) Bolingbrook, Illinois, U.S.
- Listed height: 6 ft 5 in (1.96 m)
- Listed weight: 185 lb (84 kg)

Career information
- High school: Bolingbrook (Bolingbrook, Illinois)
- College: Truman (2016–2020)
- NBA draft: 2020: undrafted
- Playing career: 2020–present

Career history
- 2020–2021: Houston Rockets
- 2021: →Rio Grande Valley Vipers
- 2021: Rio Grande Valley Vipers
- 2021: Cleveland Cavaliers
- 2021: →Canton Charge
- 2021–2022: Boston Celtics
- 2021: →Maine Celtics
- 2023–2024: Ontario Clippers
- 2024: NBA G League United
- 2024–2025: Manisa Basket

Career highlights
- All-NBA G League Second Team (2021); NBA G League All-Rookie Team (2021); GLVC Player of the Year (2020); 3× First-team All-GLVC (2018–2020); GLVC tournament MVP (2020)
- Stats at NBA.com
- Stats at Basketball Reference

Brodric Thomas (born January 28, 1997) is an American professional basketball player who last played for Manisa Basket of the Basketbol Süper Ligi (BSL). He played college basketball for the Truman State Bulldogs.

== High school and college career ==
Thomas attended Bolingbrook High School in Illinois where he played basketball. At Bolingbrook, he "played second or third fiddle" to teammates who went on to play for NCAA Division I schools. As a result, he received comparatively less attention from college basketball recruiters.

Thomas committed to play college basketball in NCAA Division II for the Truman State Bulldogs. Before his freshman year, he suffered an injury which forced him to redshirt. In the meantime, his grades suffered and he transferred to Southwestern Community College where he grew four inches, added fifty pounds, won a NJCAA Men's Division II Basketball Championship, was named the MVP of that tournament, was First Team All-Iowa Community College Athletic Conference, was named Second-Team All-American and attracted the attention of NCAA Division I recruiters.

However, he ultimately decided to return to Truman. He played three seasons for the Bulldogs. As a senior, he was named the Great Lakes Valley Conference Player of the Year and scored a school record 666 points.

== Professional career ==
=== Houston Rockets (2020–2021) ===
After going undrafted in the 2020 NBA draft, Thomas signed with the Houston Rockets. His contract was converted to a two-way contract at the end of training camp.

He made his NBA debut on December 26, 2020, in Portland at the Moda Center. On February 12, 2021, Thomas was waived by the Rockets. He had totaled ten points in 24 minutes over four games with the Rockets.

=== Rio Grande Valley Vipers (2021) ===
On February 14, 2021, the Rio Grande Valley Vipers announced that they had signed Thomas.

=== Cleveland Cavaliers (2021) ===
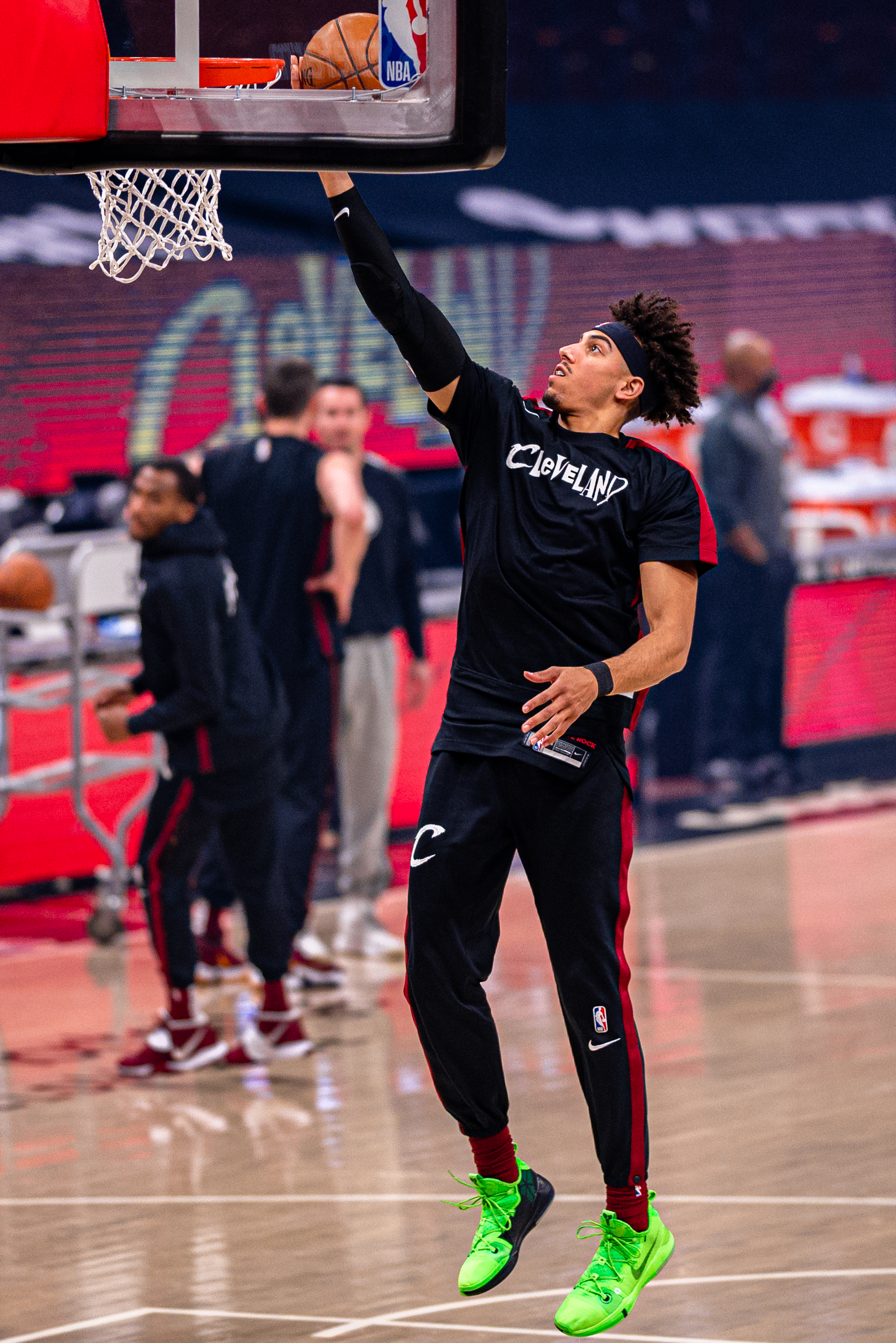
Thomas with the Cleveland Cavaliers in 2021

On February 24, 2021, Thomas was signed by Cleveland Cavaliers to a two-way contract. He was re-signed on September 15, but was later waived on October 12.

=== Boston Celtics (2021–2022) ===
On October 18, 2021, Thomas signed a two-way deal with the Boston Celtics. The Celtics reached the 2022 NBA Finals, where they were defeated by the Golden State Warriors in 6 games. He re-signed with the Celtics on September 23, 2022. He was waived on October 12, 2022.

=== Ontario Clippers (2023–2024) ===
On October 2, 2023, Thomas signed with the Los Angeles Clippers, but was waived on October 9. On October 30, Thomas joined the Ontario Clippers.

On September 28, 2024, Thomas signed with the Sacramento Kings, but was waived on October 18.

=== Manisa Basket (2024–2025) ===
On November 16, 2024, Thomas signed with Manisa Basket of the Basketbol Süper Ligi (BSL).

On July 8, 2025, he signed with Fighting Eagles Nagoya of the B.League. On July 23, his contract was terminated.

== Personal life ==
Thomas majored in psychology in college.

== Career statistics ==
Legend
GP	Games played	GS	Games started	MPG	Minutes per game
FG%	Field goal percentage	3P%	3-point field goal percentage	FT%	Free throw percentage
RPG	Rebounds per game	APG	Assists per game	SPG	Steals per game
BPG	Blocks per game	PPG	Points per game	**Bold**	Career high

=== NBA ===
==== Regular season ====
Year	Team	GP	GS	MPG	FG%	3P%	FT%	RPG	APG	SPG	BPG	PPG
2020–21	Houston	4	0	6.0	.286	.167	**.714**	1.0	1.0	.3	**.3**	2.5
2020–21	Cleveland	**28**	**1**	**13.4**	.366	**.283**	.667	**1.8**	**1.9**	**.5**	**.3**	**4.1**
2021–22	Boston	12	0	5.0	**.444**	.222	.600	.8	.9	.1	.1	1.8
Career		44	1	10.4	.373	.265	.667	1.4	.9	.4	.3	3.3
