= Kaiser Gates =

American basketball player (born 1996)

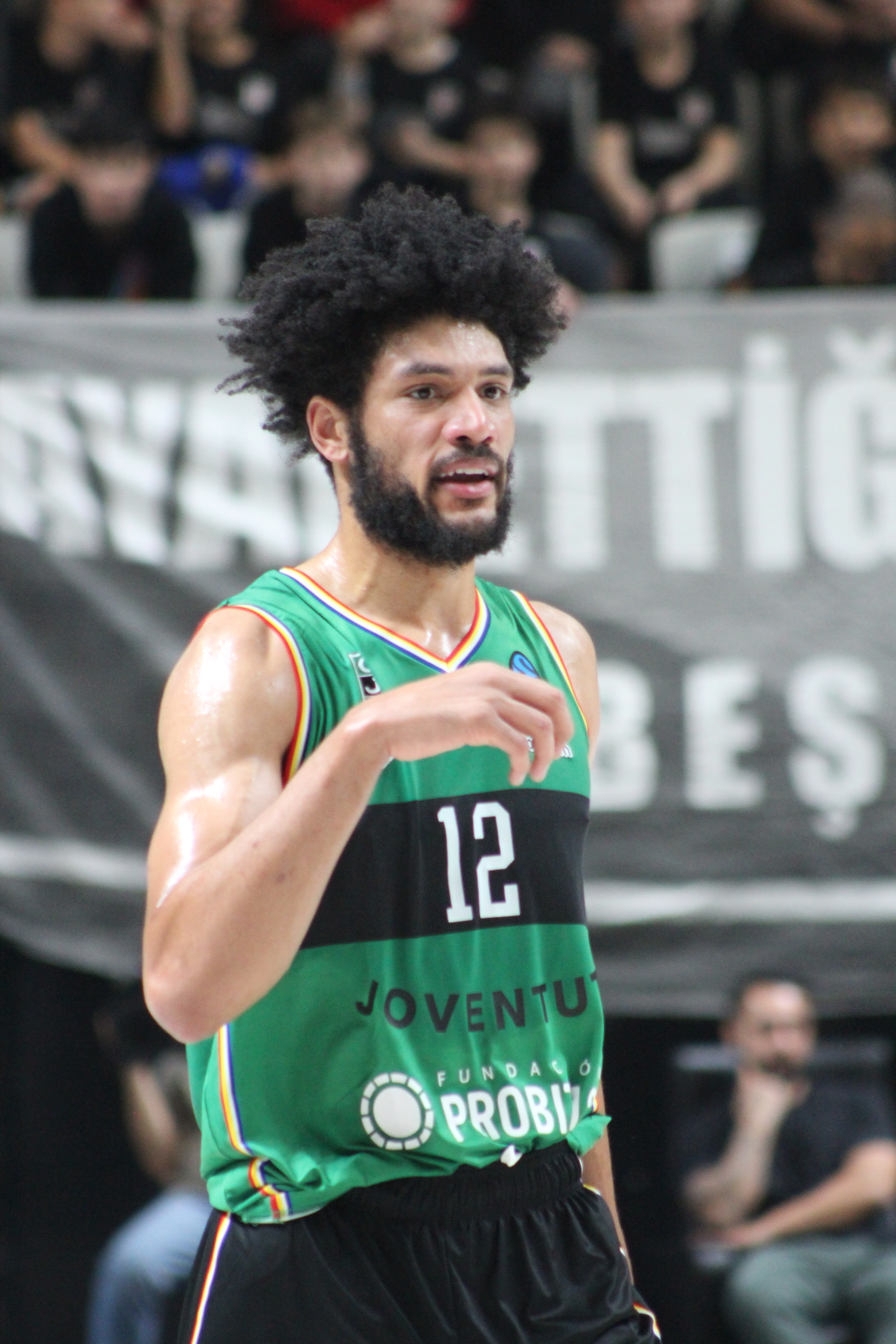
- Gates with Joventut in 2024

No. 4 – UCAM Murcia
- Position: Small forward
- League: Liga ACB; Champions League

Personal information
- Born: November 8, 1996 (age 30) Atlanta, Georgia, U.S.
- Listed height: 6 ft 7 in (2.01 m)
- Listed weight: 225 lb (102 kg)

Career information
- High school: St. Francis (Alpharetta, Georgia)
- College: Xavier (2015–2018)
- NBA draft: 2018: undrafted
- Playing career: 2018–present

Career history
- 2018–2019: Windy City Bulls
- 2019–2020: Maine Red Claws
- 2021: Long Island Nets
- 2021–2022: Hapoel Jerusalem
- 2022–2024: Long Island Nets
- 2023: New Orleans Pelicans
- 2024–2025: Joventut Badalona
- 2025–present: UCAM Murcia

Career highlights
- All-Champions League Defensive Team (2022)
- Stats at NBA.com
- Stats at Basketball Reference

Kaiser Evan Bray-Gates (born November 8, 1996) is an American professional basketball player for UCAM Murcia of the Spanish Liga ACB. He played college basketball for the Xavier Musketeers.

== High school career ==
Gates attended St. Francis High School. Alongside teammate Kobi Simmons and Malik Beasley, he led the team to two, back to back, state titles. Gates finished with more than 1,200 points and is the school's all-time leading rebounder. He was regarded as three-star recruit and the 10th best player in Georgia by 247 sports and selected Xavier over offers from Texas Tech, Vanderbilt, Florida State, Georgia and Missouri.

== College career ==
Gates posted 3.2 points and 2.6 rebounds per game as a freshman. He missed the first five games of his sophomore season with a knee injury. As a sophomore, Gates averaged 5.8 points and 4.1 rebounds per game and played an important role in Xavier's run to the Elite Eight. In a win over Florida State in the Round of 32, he contributed 14 points, five rebounds and two assists. Gates averaged 7.2 points and 4.6 rebounds per game as a junior. He was a strong defender and shooter, hitting 37.8 percent of his three-point attempts. Gates started 22 games as a junior, with most coming in the first half of the season. After the season, Gates declared for the NBA draft and hired an agent, thus forgoing his senior season at Xavier. He finished his career with 533 points.

== Professional career ==
After going undrafted in the 2018 NBA draft, Gates signed with the Chicago Bulls for NBA Summer League play. He averaged 6.7 points and 1.7 rebounds per game in three games. Gates signed a training camp contract with the Bulls on September 14, 2018. He was waived by the Bulls on October 12, 2018. Gates was added to the training camp roster of the Bulls' G League affiliate, the Windy City Bulls. On October 18, 2019, the Celtics waived Gates. Gates played in all 50 of Windy City's games, averaging 12.7 points and 6.5 rebounds per game.

On September 12, 2019, his returning rights were traded to the Maine Red Claws for the #4 overall pick in the 2019 G League draft. On January 9, 2020, Gates finished with 24 points and 10 rebounds and made a buzzer-beating game-winning layup in a 120–118 triple overtime win over the Capital City Go-Go.

On December 16, 2020, Gates was signed by the Brooklyn Nets, and was then waived the next day. On January 27, 2021, Gates was included in the roster of the Long Island Nets. In 12 games, Gates averaged 9 points and 5.7 rebounds per game.

On September 8, 2021, Gates signed with Hapoel Jerusalem B.C. of the Israeli Basketball Premier League.

On November 4, 2022, Gates was named to the opening night roster for the Long Island Nets.

On September 30, 2023, Gates signed a two-way contract with the New Orleans Pelicans, but was waived on November 3.

On November 12, 2023, Gates rejoined the Long Island Nets.

On July 26, 2024, Gates signed with Joventut Badalona of the Liga ACB.

On January 20, 2025, Gates signed with UCAM Murcia of the Liga ACB until the end of the 2024-25 season, with a one-year extension option.

== Career statistics ==
Legend
GP	Games played	GS	Games started	MPG	Minutes per game
FG%	Field goal percentage	3P%	3-point field goal percentage	FT%	Free throw percentage
RPG	Rebounds per game	APG	Assists per game	SPG	Steals per game
BPG	Blocks per game	PPG	Points per game	**Bold**	Career high

=== NBA ===
Year	Team	GP	GS	MPG	FG%	3P%	FT%	RPG	APG	SPG	BPG	PPG
2023–24	New Orleans	1	0	7.4	.000	.000	—	1.0	.0	.0	.0	.0
Career		1	0	7.4	.000	.000	—	1.0	.0	.0	.0	.0

=== College ===
Year	Team	GP	GS	MPG	FG%	3P%	FT%	RPG	APG	SPG	BPG	PPG
2015–16	Xavier	30	0	10.4	**.433**	.333	.568	2.6	.2	.4	.2	3.2
2016–17	Xavier	33	4	21.0	.387	.339	.722	4.0	.7	**.5**	.2	5.8
2017–18	Xavier	**34**	**18**	**23.8**	.413	**.378**	**.827**	**4.6**	**.9**	**.5**	**.3**	**7.2**
Career		97	22	18.7	.406	.357	.712	3.8	.6	.4	.2	5.5
