= Marlon Taylor =

American basketball player (born 1997)

Personal information
- Born: August 16, 1997 (age 29) Mount Vernon, New York
- Listed height: 6 ft 5 in (1.96 m)
- Listed weight: 209 lb (95 kg)

Career information
- High school: Forest Trail Academy (Kernersville, North Carolina); Mount Vernon (Mount Vernon, New York)
- College: Panola (2016–2018); LSU (2018–2020)
- NBA draft: 2020: undrafted
- Playing career: 2021–2023
- Position: Guard

Career history
- 2021: Erie BayHawks
- 2021: Leones de Santo Domingo
- 2022: London Lightning
- 2023: Wellington Saints
- Stats at NBA.com
- Stats at Basketball Reference

Marlon Taylor (born August 16, 1997) is an American former professional basketball player who last played for the Wellington Saints of the New Zealand National Basketball League (NZNBL). He played college basketball for the Panola Ponies and LSU Tigers.

== High school career ==
Taylor attended Mount Vernon and had a prep school year at (now defunct) Forest Trail Academy in Kernersville, North Carolina. At Mount Vernon, he averaged 14 points and 9 rebounds and help his team reach a 19–4 record and the New York Section I Class AA state championships.

== College career ==
Taylor attended Panola his first two years. In his freshman year, the team went 26–9 and advanced to the second round of the NJCAA national tournament for the first time since 1979 after winning the Region 14 tournament and in his sophomore year, he averaged 17.0 points, 9.5 rebounds and 1.8 assists as Panola posted a 20–12 record and advanced to the NJCAA Region 14 Tournament quarterfinals.

As a junior in 2018–19, Taylor transferred to LSU and started 24 games, averaging 6.7 points and 3.6 rebounds. As a senior in 2019–20, he had surgery in his left leg, limiting him to 21 games in which he averaged 5.9 points and 4.1 rebounds in 23.2 minutes. However, his final LSU game was his best, scoring 30 points while making 10-of-17 field goals, with three treys in a 94–64 win at home against Georgia.

== Professional career ==
After going undrafted in the 2020 NBA draft, Taylor signed on November 18, 2020, an Exhibit 10 deal with the Washington Wizards, but was waived on December 18 after one preseason game. On January 12, 2021, he signed as a flex-affiliate player with the Erie BayHawks of the NBA G League after the Capital City Go-Go withdrew for the COVID-19 pandemic. In 6 regular season games, he averaged 2.0 points, 1.4 rebounds and 0.5 assists in 10.1 minutes and in his only playoff game, he scored 9 points from the bench in a 139–110 loss to the Lakeland Magic.

In August 2021, Taylor signed with the Leones de Santo Domingo of the Liga Nacional de Baloncesto.

On October 28, 2021, Taylor signed with the Oklahoma City Blue. However, he was waived on November 2. On January 6, 2022, Taylor signed with London Lightning of the National Basketball League of Canada but was waived on March 10.

On March 23, 2023, Taylor signed with the Wellington Saints for the 2023 New Zealand NBL season. He was released by the Saints on June 20, 2023.

== Personal life ==
Taylor is the son of Zenobia Crenshaw and has a younger brother and a younger sister. He majored in sport administration.
