= Matthew Freeman =

Matthew Freeman may refer to:

- Matt Freeman (basketball) (born 1997), player
- Matthew Freeman (twirler) (born 1992), baton twirler
- Matt Freeman (born 1966), American musician
- Matt Freeman (Power of Five), the protagonist of Anthony Horowitz's The Power of Five novels
