= Indian Panthers =

Indian basketball team in Auckland, New Zealand

- League: NZNBL
- Founded: October 2024
- Folded: May 2025
- History: Indian Panthers; 2025
- Location: Auckland, New Zealand
- Team colours: Black, white, orange
Home	Away

The Indian Panthers were a basketball team that competed in the New Zealand National Basketball League (NZNBL) during the 2025 season. Based in Auckland, the Panthers initially played their home games at Pulman Arena in Takanini before switching mid-season to the Franklin Pool and Leisure Centre in Pukekohe.

Established in October 2024 by the Indian National Basketball League (INBL), the franchise aimed to foster international basketball connections and provide Indian players with professional opportunities abroad. Despite initial aspirations, the team's debut season was marred by significant challenges, including the failure to bring the majority of their Indian-based players to New Zealand. Only three of the ten Indian players initially named in the squad travelled to New Zealand, leading to operational difficulties and a lack of competitive depth. These issues culminated in the team's suspension from the league in early May 2025 due to serious allegations, and they officially withdrew from the competition later that month, acknowledging their inability to meet the conditions required to complete the season.

== Team history ==
In July 2024, it was revealed that the New Zealand NBL was looking at an expansion team from the Indian National Basketball League (INBL). On 30 October 2024, it was announced that the Indian Panthers would join the 2025 New Zealand NBL season, with a roster primarily consisting of Indian national players. They based themselves in Auckland, with the city being home to the largest percentage of migrants from India as of the 2023 census. While initially believed to be backed by the INBL, it was later reported by The Post that club backing had been via Australia-based property entrepreneurs who were not present in Auckland.

Ten Indian players were initially named in the Panthers' squad, including Princepal Singh. However, due to a delayed start and end of the INBL season, as well as delayed visa applications and an Indian national team camp, the Panthers were unable to participate in the NBL's pre-season tournament and two days prior to their season opener, it was announced that the team would start the season with a mostly New Zealand player roster, which included Leon Henry. Henry reportedly took responsibility to scramble together a roster of social players after management initially threatened to forfeit the first four games of the season.

In their inaugural game on 12 March 2025, the Panthers lost 112–78 to the Hawke's Bay Hawks in Napier. Head coach Miles Pearce chose to step down after just one game, announcing his departure two days before the Panthers' debut home game of the season. He was replaced by interim coach Jonathan Goodman. The team was later without Goodman, their CEO and their general manager for a fortnight, with the trio all based in Melbourne. American import Alex Robinson parted ways with the team after six games due to non-payment.

The team reportedly did not have a practice facility in Auckland, with impromptu training sessions having to be organised by players. In lieu of training, the team would merely assemble at the venue a couple of hours before a game to do what they could as they awaited tip-off. A mid-season home venue switch saw the Panthers move from Takanini to Pukekohe because the club was unable to afford the operational costs at Pulman Arena. With outstanding bills owed to Pulman Arena, the club began relying on the generosity of the Franklin Bulls to stage home games at the Franklin Pool and Leisure Centre.

By late April, just three of the team's ten Indian players had travelled to New Zealand. Internal questions over the delayed arrival of the team's Indian players would go unanswered by management. The team's Chinese import, Shenghze Li, and three Indian players—Tushal Singh, Aaron Blessing and Sejin Mathew—reportedly lacked funds to pay for food, relying on food banks and rival clubs giving them food vouchers. Reports emerged that the challenges faced by Indian players already with the Panthers in New Zealand were discouraging their compatriots back in India from joining the team.

On 25 April 2025, the New Zealand NBL was notified about delayed payments to Panthers players and staff. A meeting with the team's ownership occurred on 28 April. By the next day, some players had been paid and the game against the Canterbury Rams was expected to go ahead, but the Panthers players chose not to play, leading the league to postpone the match. On 1 May, the Panthers were suspended indefinitely from the league with immediate effect. On 9 May, the league postponed two further games involving the Panthers and provided the team a 10-day notice to fully adhere to all conditions; if not satisfied, the participation agreement would be terminated. On 19 May, it was reported that the team's three Indian players had returned to India. That same day, the Panthers' 20 May game against the Tauranga Whai was postponed.

On 22 May 2025, the Panthers officially withdrew from the NBL, citing an inability to meet the league's requirements to complete the season due to a range of factors. As a result of the Panthers withdrawal, the NBL advised that the 2025 season would be completed with 11 teams and that all results from the nine games played by the Panthers would be removed entirely. The Panthers had a 0–9 record at the time of their withdrawal.
