= Alex Robinson (basketball) =

American basketball player (born 1995)

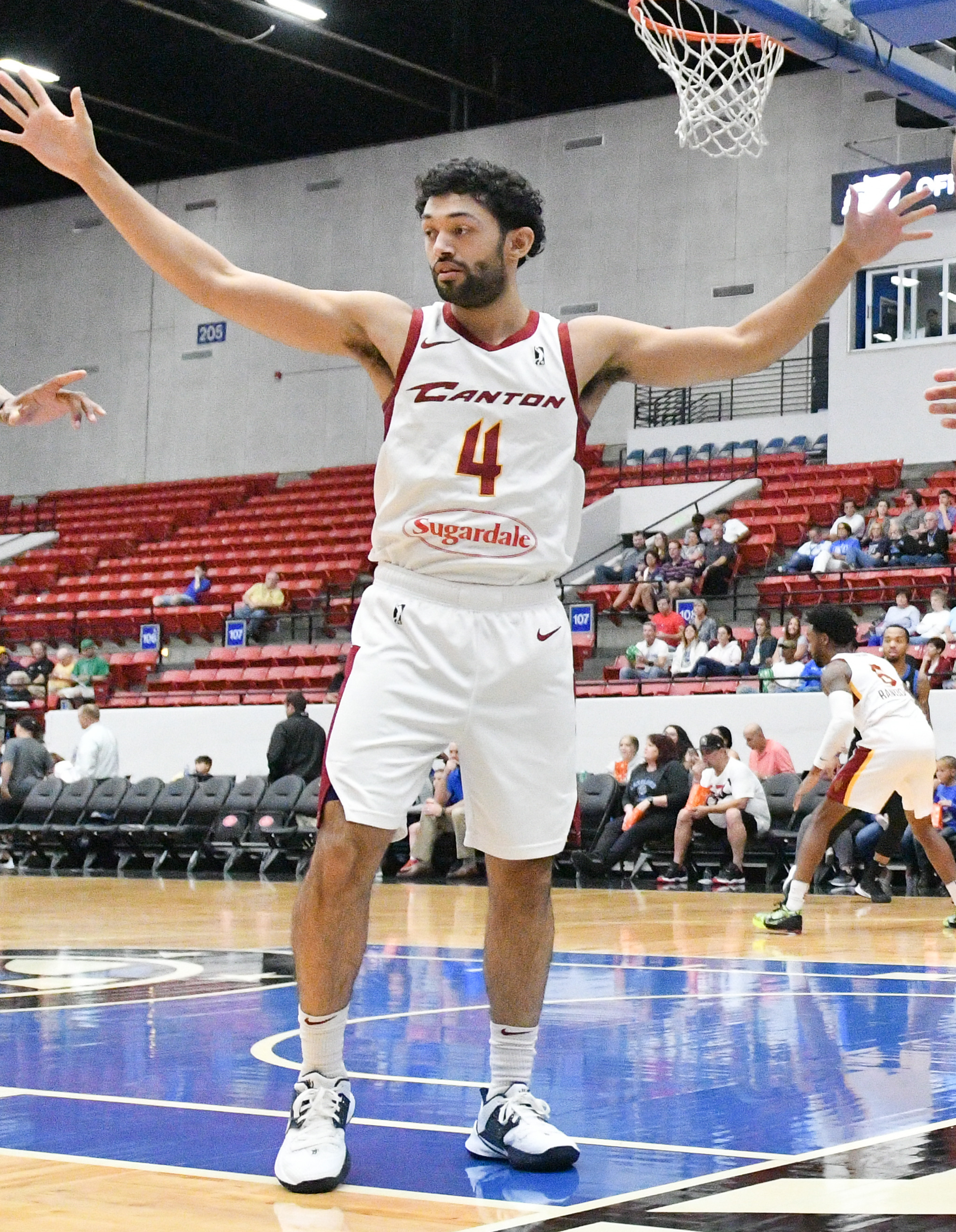
- Robinson with the Canton Charge in 2020

Free agent
- Position: Point guard

Personal information
- Born: May 20, 1995 (age 31) Fort Worth, Texas, U.S.
- Listed height: 6 ft 1 in (1.85 m)
- Listed weight: 180 lb (82 kg)

Career information
- High school: Timberview (Mansfield, Texas)
- College: Texas A&M (2014–2015); TCU (2016–2019)
- NBA draft: 2019: undrafted
- Playing career: 2019–present

Career history
- 2019–2020: Canton Charge
- 2020: Santa Cruz Warriors
- 2020: Iowa Wolves
- 2020–2021: BC Vienna
- 2021: Salt Lake City Stars
- 2021–2022: Wisconsin Herd
- 2022: Fort Wayne Mad Ants
- 2022: Long Island Nets
- 2022: Knox Raiders
- 2023: ABC Fighters
- 2025: Hyderabad Falcons
- 2025: Indian Panthers
- 2025: Nelson Giants

Career highlights
- Third-team All-Big 12 (2019); Big 12 All-Newcomer Team (2017)
- Stats at Basketball Reference

Don Alex Robinson Jr (born May 20, 1995) is an American professional basketball player who last played for the Nelson Giants of the New Zealand National Basketball League (NZNBL). He played college basketball for the Texas A&M Aggies and TCU Horned Frogs.

== Early life ==
Robinson was born in Fort Worth, Texas. He attended Timberview High School in Arlington, Texas, where he averaged over 23 points per game as a senior.

== College career ==
=== Texas A&M ===
As a freshman with the Texas A&M Aggies in 2014–15, Robinson played in 32 games and averaged 5.2 points and 2.6 assists in 18.8 minutes per game. He helped the Aggies secure a berth in the 2015 National Invitation Tournament.

=== TCU ===
After one season at A&M, Robinson transferred to Texas Christian University, where he sat out the 2015–16 season due to NCAA transfer rules. He chose to wear jersey number 25, which his mother had worn while playing for the TCU women's basketball team in the 1980s.

Under new head coach Jamie Dixon, Robinson became the Horned Frogs' starting point guard as a redshirt sophomore in 2016–17. He averaged a team-high 5.8 assists per game, helping lead the Frogs to a 24–15 record that included an upset win over #1 Kansas in the Big 12 tournament and culminated in winning the 2017 NIT title. Robinson recorded a double-double with 10 points and 11 assists against Georgia Tech in the championship game at Madison Square Garden and was named to the All-Tournament team.

As a junior in 2017–18, Robinson once again led TCU with 6.1 assists per game. In January 2018, he set a new school and Big 12 Conference record by tallying 17 assists in a home win over Iowa State. The Frogs finished the season with a 21–12 record, which included a berth in the 2018 NCAA tournament, the program's first in 20 years.

Early in Robinson's senior season, the Frogs won the 10th annual Diamond Head Classic held in Honolulu, Hawaii. With 26 assists in TCU's three games, Robinson set a new tournament record and was named the event's most valuable player. He was named to the All-Big 12 Third Team for the 2018–19 season after 12.5 points, 6.9 assists and 3.9 rebounds in 37 games. He finished with the season with 254 assists, the most in a season at TCU, and finished as TCU basketball's all-time assist leader with 672.

== Professional career ==
=== NBA G League (2019–2020) ===
After going undrafted in the 2019 NBA draft, Robinson joined the Sacramento Kings for the 2019 NBA Summer League. He joined the Cleveland Cavaliers for the 2019 NBA pre-season and then joined the Canton Charge of the NBA G League for the 2019–20 season. In 22 games for the Charge, he averaged 4.8 points, 1.6 rebounds and 2.5 assists per game.

On February 21, 2020, Robinson was traded to the Santa Cruz Warriors. He played one game before being traded again to the Iowa Wolves on February 27. He played four games for Iowa to finish the season.

=== BC Vienna (2020–2021) ===
On October 14, 2020, Robinson signed with BC Vienna of the Austrian Basketball Superliga. In 10 games during the 2020–21 season, he averaged 12.9 points, 6.6 rebounds, 5.5 assists and 1.0 steals per game.

=== Return to NBA G League (2021–2022) ===
In October 2021, Teague joined the Salt Lake City Stars of the NBA G League. He appeared in one game before being waived on November 6.

On December 20, 2021, Robinson was acquired by the Wisconsin Herd. He was waived on February 8, 2022, after appearing in four games. He joined the Fort Wayne Mad Ants on February 22 and was waived on March 11 after appearing in four games. On March 18, he was acquired by the Long Island Nets. He was waived on March 30 after appearing in two games.

=== Knox Raiders (2022) ===
Robinson joined the Knox Raiders of the NBL1 South in Australia for the 2022 season. In 23 games, he averaged 17.1 points, 5.7 rebounds, 4.8 assists and 1.8 steals per game.

=== ABC Fighters (2023) ===
In February 2023, Robinson signed with the ABC Fighters of Ivory Coast to play in the 2023 BAL season. In five games, he averaged 9.0 points, 5.0 rebounds, 4.4 assists and 1.2 steals per game.

=== Hyderabad Falcons (2025) ===
Robinson joined the Hyderabad Falcons of the Indian National Basketball League for the 2025 season. In 11 games, he averaged 15.1 points, 6.5 rebounds, 9.4 assists and 2.4 steals per game.

=== Indian Panthers (2025) ===
In March 2025, Robinson joined the Indian Panthers of the New Zealand National Basketball League (NZNBL) for the 2025 season. He parted ways with the Panthers on April 7 due to non-payment. In six games, he averaged 17.7 points, 5.8 rebounds, 5.0 assists and 1.8 steals per game.

=== Nelson Giants (2025) ===
On April 11, 2025, Robinson signed with the Nelson Giants for the rest of the 2025 NZNBL season. In 15 games, he averaged 15.9 points, 4.4 rebounds, 6.8 assists and 2.1 steals per game.

== Personal life ==
Robinson's mother, Darla, competed for the TCU women's basketball team from 1982 through 1984. He has one sister, Angelica.
