= Jayden Bezzant =

New Zealand basketball player

No. 66 – Tauranga Whai
- Position: Shooting guard / point guard
- League: NZNBL

Personal information
- Born: 9 January 1996 (age 30) Hamilton, New Zealand
- Listed height: 6 ft 2 in (1.88 m)
- Listed weight: 185 lb (84 kg)

Career information
- High school: St John's College (Hamilton, New Zealand); Westwind Prep (Phoenix, Arizona)
- College: Northwest Nazarene (2016–2020)
- NBA draft: 2020: undrafted
- Playing career: 2020–present

Career history
- 2020–2021: Manawatu Jets
- 2022–2023: Franklin Bulls
- 2022–2023: New Zealand Breakers
- 2024–present: Tauranga Whai

Career highlights
- First-team All-GNAC (2020)

Jayden Tuatahi Bezzant (born 9 January 1996) is a New Zealand basketball player for the Tauranga Whai of the New Zealand National Basketball League (NZNBL). He played college basketball in the United States for the Northwest Nazarene Nighthawks between 2016 and 2020 before beginning his career in the New Zealand NBL. He debuted for the New Zealand Breakers of the Australian National Basketball League (NBL) during the 2022–23 season and debuted for the New Zealand Tall Blacks in 2022.

== Early life ==
Bezzant was born in Hamilton, New Zealand. He spent time living in Tauranga before returning to Hamilton where he attended St John's College, the high school his father played for in 1992. Bezzant played for Waikato Basketball and Tauranga City Basketball.

In January 2014, Bezzant moved to the United States to attend Westwind Preparatory Academy in Phoenix, Arizona.

== College career ==
Bezzant initially joined the University of Texas Rio Grande Valley, an NCAA Division I school in Edinburg, Texas, but after redshirting the 2015–16 season, a coaching change saw him lose his spot on the team and he subsequently transferred to Northwest Nazarene University in Nampa, Idaho, in 2016.

Bezzant debuted for the Northwest Nazarene Nighthawks of the Great Northwest Athletic Conference (GNAC) in the NCAA Division II in the 2016–17 season. He began playing shooting guard despite having grown up playing point guard. In 25 games, he made 19 starts and averaged 9.3 points, 2.4 rebounds, 2.7 assists and 1.4 steals per game.

In 26 games in 2017–18, Bezzant made 25 starts and averaged 14.3 points, 3.1 rebounds, 2.1 assists and 1.4 steals per game.

Bezzant moved to a permanent reserve role for the Nighthawks during the 2018–19 season. On 2 February 2019, he scored 30 points, with 25 coming after halftime, in a 92–89 overtime win over MSU Billings. In 26 games, he made eight starts and averaged 13.1 points, 2.1 rebounds and 2.1 assists per game. He was named All-GNAC Honorable Mention.

Following the 2018–19 season, Bezzant left the Nighthawks program to return to New Zealand after he received a professional contract opportunity. During the off-season, he was encouraged by the coaching staff to reconsider and finish his degree. He eventually decided to come back to Northwest Nazarene but was ineligible to play in the first semester of the 2019–20 season due to poor grades the previous spring. To earn eligibility again, he took 21 credits in the fall semester.

In his season debut on 2 January 2020, Bezzant hit a game-winning 3-pointer with 10 seconds left in a 74–71 win over Simon Fraser. He made the switch to point guard from shooting guard for his final season. In 19 games in 2019–20, he made 18 starts and averaged 14.0 points, 2.0 rebounds and 3.9 assists per game. He was named first-team All-GNAC.

== Professional career ==
Prior to the COVID-19 pandemic, Bezzant had signed with the Franklin Bulls of the New Zealand National Basketball League (NZNBL) for the 2020 season.

In June 2020, Bezzant was acquired in a draft by the Manawatu Jets for the New Zealand NBL Showdown in Auckland. He started every game for the Jets and helped the team reach the final, where they lost 79–77 to the Otago Nuggets. He impressed throughout the Showdown with his ability to score and create chances for his team-mates, demonstrating calmness and confidence in high-pressure situations. He averaged 17.3 points, 3.1 rebounds and 3.6 assists, in just over 30 minutes a game.

In November 2020, Bezzant re-signed with the Jets for the 2021 New Zealand NBL season. He averaged 15.8 points, 3.1 rebounds and 2.7 assists per game.

In January 2022, Bezzant signed with the Franklin Bulls for the 2022 New Zealand NBL season. He missed games during the season with national 3x3 duties. In the season finale on 7 August, he scored 31 points in a 104–99 overtime loss to the Otago Nuggets.

In December 2022, Bezzant joined the New Zealand Breakers of the Australian National Basketball League (NBL) as a Covid replacement player. He played his one and only game for the Breakers on 26 December, recording one rebound in seven minutes against the Tasmania JackJumpers. He remained with the Breakers for the rest of the 2022–23 season.

In March 2023, Bezzant re-signed with the Bulls for the 2023 New Zealand NBL season. His numbers declined in 2023 as his role shifted to one off the bench. He played all 20 games and averaged 6.8 points and 2.7 assists per game. Following the season, he played 3x3 basketball in China.

In December 2023, Bezzant signed with the Tauranga Whai, a new franchise entering the New Zealand NBL for the first time in 2024.

In January 2025, Bezzant re-signed with the Whai for the 2025 New Zealand NBL season.

In January 2026, Bezzant re-signed with the Whai for the 2026 New Zealand NBL season. In July 2026, he played for Maori Basketball New Zealand in an exhibition match against the Indigenous Basketball Australia All-Stars, where he scored seven points in a 106–88 loss.

== National team career ==
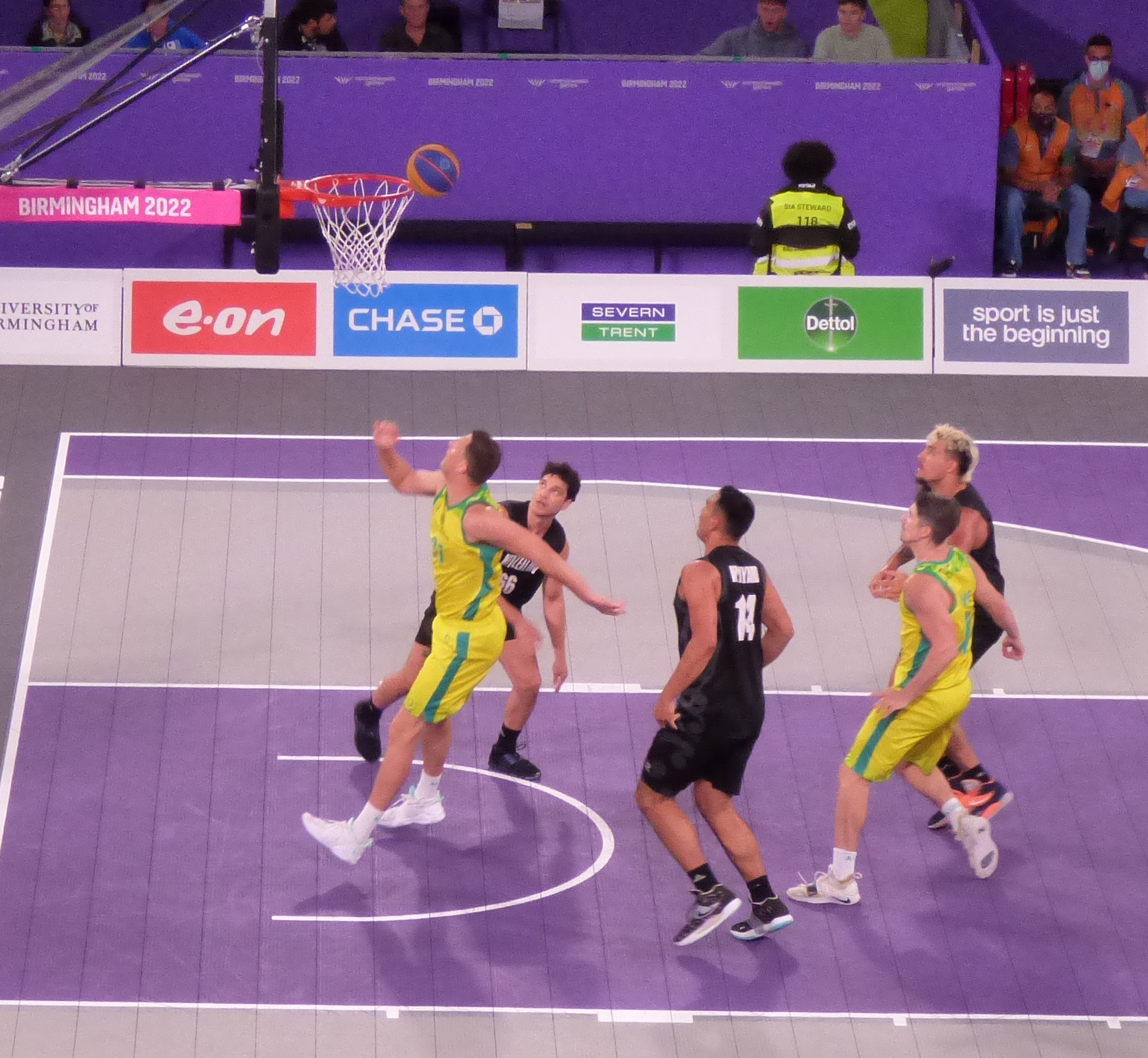
Bezzant (#66) playing for New Zealand at the 2022 Commonwealth Games

Bezzant debuted for New Zealand with the Junior Tall Blacks at the 2014 FIBA Oceania Under-18 Championship.

In February 2022, Bezzant played two games for the Tall Blacks during the FIBA Basketball World Cup Asian Qualifiers. He also played for the New Zealand 3x3 team at the 2022 FIBA 3x3 World Cup, 2022 FIBA 3x3 Asia Cup, and 2022 Commonwealth Games. He won a silver medal at the Asia Cup.

== Personal life ==
Bezzant is the son of Brett and Teresa. He has two sisters. His grandmother, Mary Ellen Bezzant, was a sports administrator at St John's College in Hamilton.
