= Quinton Rose =

American college basketball player

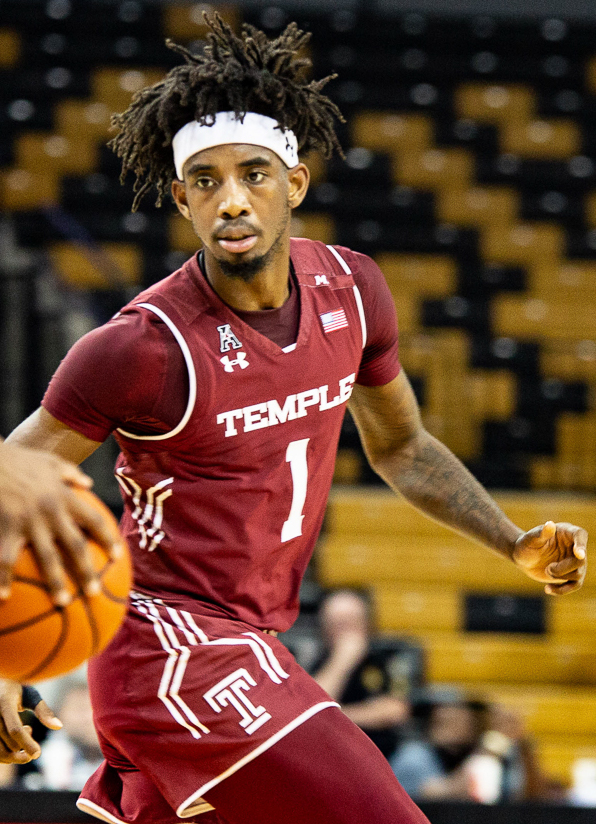
- Rose with Temple in 2019

Free agent
- Position: Shooting guard / small forward

Personal information
- Born: January 26, 1998 (age 28) Rochester, New York, U.S.
- Listed height: 6 ft 8 in (2.03 m)
- Listed weight: 185 lb (84 kg)

Career information
- High school: Bishop Kearney (Irondequoit, New York)
- College: Temple (2016–2020)
- NBA draft: 2020: undrafted
- Playing career: 2021–present

Career history
- 2021–2023: Westchester Knicks
- 2023–2024: Rip City Remix
- 2024: Delaware Blue Coats
- 2024: Ostioneros de Guaymas
- 2024: Valley Suns
- 2024–2025: Austin Spurs
- 2025: Manawatu Jets

Career highlights
- 2× Second-team All-AAC (2019, 2020); AAC All-Rookie Team (2017)
- Stats at NBA.com
- Stats at Basketball Reference

Quinton Rashod Rose (born January 26, 1998) is an American professional basketball player who last played for the Manawatu Jets of the New Zealand National Basketball League (NZNBL). He played college basketball for the Temple Owls.

== High school career ==
Rose grew up in Rochester, New York, and began playing with fellow standout Thomas Bryant in third grade. Rose played basketball for Bishop Kearney High School in Irondequoit, New York. As a junior, he averaged 15.4 points, seven rebounds and seven assists per game. In his senior season, Rose averaged 23 points and six rebounds per game, leading Bishop Kearney to the Class AA sectional semifinals and earning second-team All-State honors. He played Amateur Athletic Union (AAU) basketball with the City Rocks, with whom he drew attention from many NCAA Division I programs. Rose was considered a four-star recruit by ESPN and a three-star recruit by 247Sports and Rivals. He committed to play for Temple at the collegiate level on August 7, 2015.

== College career ==
Rose was named American Athletic Conference Rookie of the Week four times during his freshman season and earned a spot on the conference All-Rookie Team. He started six games and averaged 10.1 points and 4.1 rebounds per game. As a sophomore, Rose averaged 14.9 points, 4.3 rebounds, 2.3 assists, and 1.5 steals per game as Temple lost in the first round of the NIT to eventual champion Penn State. He declared for the 2018 NBA draft but opted to return to Temple after working out with several teams. He was told by NBA scouts that he needed to get stronger and improve his three-point shot. On March 3, 2019, Rose scored a career-high 29 points in an 80–69 win against Tulane. As a junior, Rose was named second-team All-American Athletic Conference. He averaged 16.3 points, 3.8 rebounds, and 2.4 assists per game. He was hampered by a stress fracture in his foot for the last two months of the season, and had offseason foot surgery. On February 8, 2020, Rose scored 25 points in an overtime win over SMU, becoming the all-time leading scorer for the American Athletic Conference. He passed Rob Gray of Houston’s mark of 1,710 career points, set in 2018. At the conclusion of the regular season. Rose was named to the Second Team All-AAC. He was named to the First Team All-Big 5.

== Professional career ==
=== Westchester Knicks (2021–2023) ===
After going undrafted in the 2020 NBA draft, Rose signed an Exhibit 10 contract with the Sacramento Kings. He was waived by the Kings on December 11, 2020, prior to the start of the 2020–21 NBA season.

On March 4, 2021, Rose was acquired by the Westchester Knicks of the NBA G League. He played in one game for Westchester to finish the G League Hub season.

Rose joined the New York Knicks for the 2021 NBA Summer League and the re-joined Westchester for the 2021–22 NBA G League season.

Rose played for the New York Knicks during the 2022 NBA Summer League and then re-joined Westchester for the 2022–23 NBA G League season.

=== Rip City Remix (2023–2024) ===
On June 8, 2023, Rose was selected by the Rip City Remix in the 2023 NBA G League Expansion Draft. He officially joined the team on October 30, 2023. He was waived on January 19, 2024.

=== Delaware Blue Coats and Ostioneros de Guaymas (2024) ===
On March 8, 2024, Rose joined the Delaware Blue Coats for the rest of the 2023–24 NBA G League season.

On April 12, 2024, Rose signed with Ostioneros de Guaymas of the Circuito de Baloncesto de la Costa del Pacífico.

Rose initially re-joined the Blue Coats for the 2024–25 season, but was waived on November 13 prior to the start of the regular season.

=== Valley Suns (2024) ===
On November 18, 2024, Rose was acquired by the Valley Suns. After appearing in two games, he was waived by the Suns on November 25.

=== Austin Spurs (2024–2025) ===
On December 11, 2024, Rose joined the Austin Spurs for the rest of the 2024–25 NBA G League season.

=== Manawatu Jets (2025) ===
On May 16, 2025, Rose signed with the Manawatu Jets of the New Zealand National Basketball League for the rest of the 2025 season.

== National team career ==
In 2016, Rose played for the United States at the Albert Schweitzer Tournament, an under-18 competition in Mannheim, Germany. He averaged a team-high 13.8 points per game as the United States finished in ninth place. Rose was a training camp finalist to play at the 2017 FIBA Under-19 World Cup in Cairo but was not named to the final roster.

== Career statistics ==
Legend
GP	Games played	GS	Games started	MPG	Minutes per game
FG%	Field goal percentage	3P%	3-point field goal percentage	FT%	Free throw percentage
RPG	Rebounds per game	APG	Assists per game	SPG	Steals per game
BPG	Blocks per game	PPG	Points per game	**Bold**	Career high

=== College ===
Year	Team	GP	GS	MPG	FG%	3P%	FT%	RPG	APG	SPG	BPG	PPG
2016–17	Temple	32	6	24.8	**.434**	.296	.689	4.1	1.9	1.5	.4	10.1
2017–18	Temple	**33**	32	32.2	**.434**	**.345**	.653	4.3	2.3	1.5	.2	14.9
2018–19	Temple	**33**	**33**	**34.6**	.408	.275	.685	3.8	2.5	**2.2**	.2	16.3
2019–20	Temple	31	31	33.4	.368	.270	**.792**	**5.0**	**3.5**	2.0	**.7**	**16.4**
Career		129	102	31.3	.408	.297	.717	4.3	2.5	1.8	.4	14.4

== Personal life ==
Rose's younger brother, Miles, is also a basketball player.
