= Ben Simmons =

Australian basketball player (born 1996)

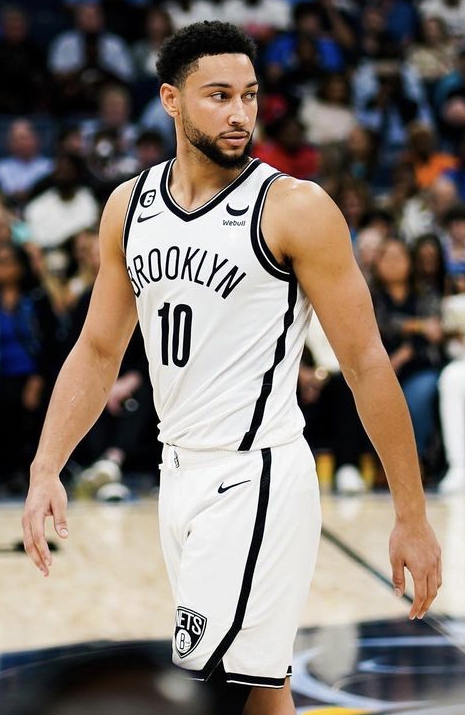
- Simmons with the Brooklyn Nets in 2022

No. 25 – Sacramento Kings
- Position: Point guard
- League: NBA

Personal information
- Born: 20 July 1996 (age 30) Melbourne, Victoria, Australia
- Listed height: 6 ft 9 in (2.06 m)
- Listed weight: 245 lb (111 kg)

Career information
- High school: Box Hill Senior Secondary College (Melbourne, Victoria); Montverde Academy (Montverde, Florida)
- College: LSU (2015–2016)
- NBA draft: 2016: 1st round, 1st overall pick
- Drafted by: Philadelphia 76ers
- Playing career: 2016–present

Career history
- 2016–2022: Philadelphia 76ers
- 2022–2025: Brooklyn Nets
- 2025: Los Angeles Clippers
- 2026–present: Sacramento Kings

Career highlights
- 3× NBA All-Star (2019–2021); All-NBA Third Team (2020); 2× NBA All-Defensive First Team (2020, 2021); NBA Rookie of the Year (2018); NBA All-Rookie First Team (2018); NBA steals leader (2020); Consensus first-team All-American (2016); USBWA National Freshman of the Year (2016); First-team All-SEC (2016); SEC Freshman of the Year (2016); National high school player of the year (2015); McDonald's All-American (2015); First-team Parade All-American (2015)
- Stats at NBA.com
- Stats at Basketball Reference
Medals
Men's basketball
Representing Australia
FIBA Oceania Championship
Gold medal – first place	2013 Australia/New Zealand	Team competition
FIBA World U17 Championship
Silver medal – second place	2012 Lithuania	Team competition

Benjamin David Simmons (born 20 July 1996) is an Australian-American professional basketball player for the Sacramento Kings of the National Basketball Association (NBA). He played college basketball for one season with the LSU Tigers, after which he was named a consensus first-team All-American and the USBWA National Freshman of the Year. Simmons was selected with the first overall pick in the 2016 NBA draft by the Philadelphia 76ers. After sitting out a year due to an injured right foot, he was named the NBA Rookie of the Year in 2018 and was selected three times to the NBA All-Star Game. After a holdout from the 76ers following the 2020–21 season, Simmons was traded to the Brooklyn Nets. His contract was bought out by the Nets in February 2025, and Simmons subsequently signed with the Los Angeles Clippers.

Simmons attended Box Hill Senior Secondary College in his hometown of Melbourne, Victoria, before moving to the United States to attend Montverde Academy in Montverde, Florida. In his only season in college, LSU began the season with high expectations, but they failed to qualify for the NCAA tournament. Simmons left school to enter the NBA draft, becoming the third Melbourne-born number one overall pick in 11 years, alongside Andrew Bogut and Kyrie Irving. Simmons is the son of an American-born father, Dave, who played professional basketball in Australia. A dual citizen of Australia and the United States, Simmons has played for the Australian national team.

== Early life ==
Simmons was born on July 20, 1996, in the Melbourne suburb of Fitzroy to Julie, a White Australian, and Dave Simmons, an African-American expatriate who later became a naturalized Australian citizen. He was raised alongside five siblings—Melissa, Emily, Liam, Sean, and Olivia—the first four being from his mother's previous marriage. His father played college basketball for the Oklahoma City Stars in the United States before playing professionally for the Melbourne Tigers in the National Basketball League (NBL) in 1989.

Simmons was raised in Newcastle from the age of 18 months while his father played and coached in the city. Simmons began playing basketball at the age of seven in the Newcastle Hunters' under-12 representative team. He later played for Lake Macquarie and Newcastle. At age 10, Simmons returned to Melbourne and began playing junior basketball for the Knox Raiders. As a youngster, he also played rugby league and Australian rules football. In year 7, while attending Whitefriars College, Simmons was named MVP after he helped Whitefriars win the Year-7 Division 1A basketball premiership.

As a teenager, Simmons was torn between his two loves of basketball and Australian rules football, but he eventually decided to focus on basketball. In year 9, at the age of 15, Simmons played basketball for Box Hill Senior Secondary College at the 2011 Australian Schools Championships before taking up a scholarship at the Australian Institute of Sport in 2012. Later that year, Simmons made his first appearance in the United States at the renowned Pangos All-American Camp for basketball prospects. Despite being only 15 years old, he was chosen to represent Australia at the 2012 FIBA Under-17 World Championship.

== High school career ==
=== Sophomore year ===
In January 2013, Simmons moved to the U.S. to compete against boys of comparable size and athleticism. He attended Montverde Academy in Montverde, Florida. In April 2013, he helped Montverde rally from a 16-point deficit to beat New Jersey's St Benedict's 67–65 in the final of the High School National Tournament. After competing in the Jordan Brand Classic International Game, he returned to Melbourne, where he joined the Bulleen Boomers of the Big V competition in June 2013.

On 14 October 2013, Simmons committed to Louisiana State University, picking LSU over other offers from Kentucky, Kansas, and Duke.

=== Junior year ===
Simmons returned to Montverde Academy for his junior season in 2013–14. On the season, Simmons averaged 18.5 points, 9.8 rebounds and 2.7 assists per game while shooting 69 percent from the field and 77 percent from the free throw line. He recorded 88 blocks as well. Montverde finished the season with a 28–0 record, closing with a 71–62 victory over Oak Hill Academy in the High School National Tournament at Madison Square Garden. Simmons had 24 points and 12 rebounds as he earned MVP honours. Following the season, he was named America's top high school junior and was voted MVP at the National Basketball Players' Association Top 100 camp.

=== Senior year ===
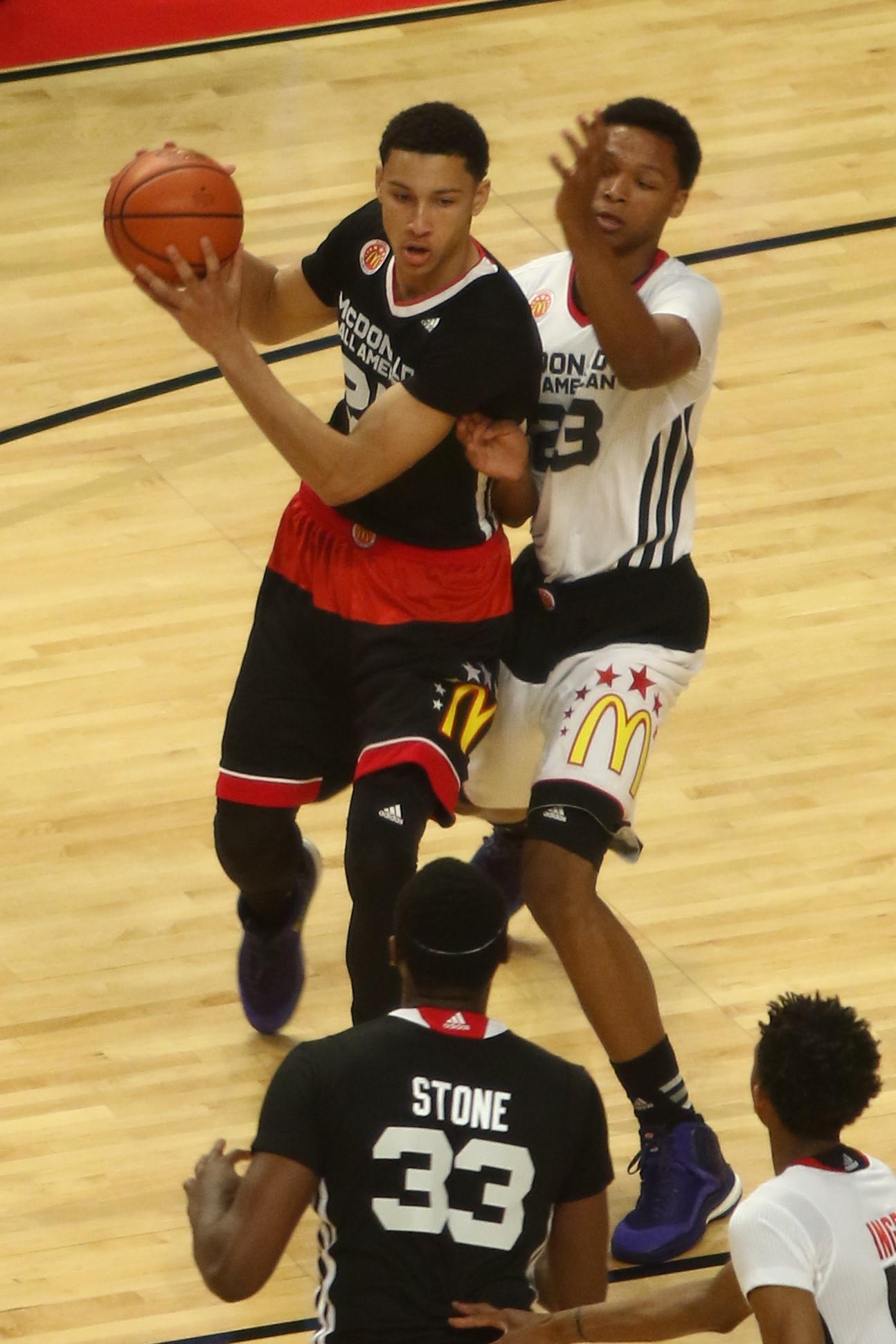
Simmons in the 2015 McDonald's All-American Game

On 12 November 2014, Simmons signed a National Letter of Intent to play college basketball for LSU. On 28 January 2015, Simmons was named as a starter for the East team to compete in the 38th annual McDonald's All-American Game. On 10 March 2015, he was named the Morgan Wootten Award winner, given annually to the best male McDonald's All-American player who exemplifies outstanding character, exhibits leadership, and embodies the values of being a student-athlete in the classroom and in the community. He was then named the Naismith Prep Player of the Year on 12 March and the Gatorade National Player of the Year on 24 March after leading the Eagles to a 28–1 record and a berth in the High School National Tournament for the third straight year. In 29 regular season games, he averaged 28.0 points, 11.9 rebounds, 4.0 assists, and 2.6 steals per game while shooting 70.7 percent from the field and recording 24 double-doubles.

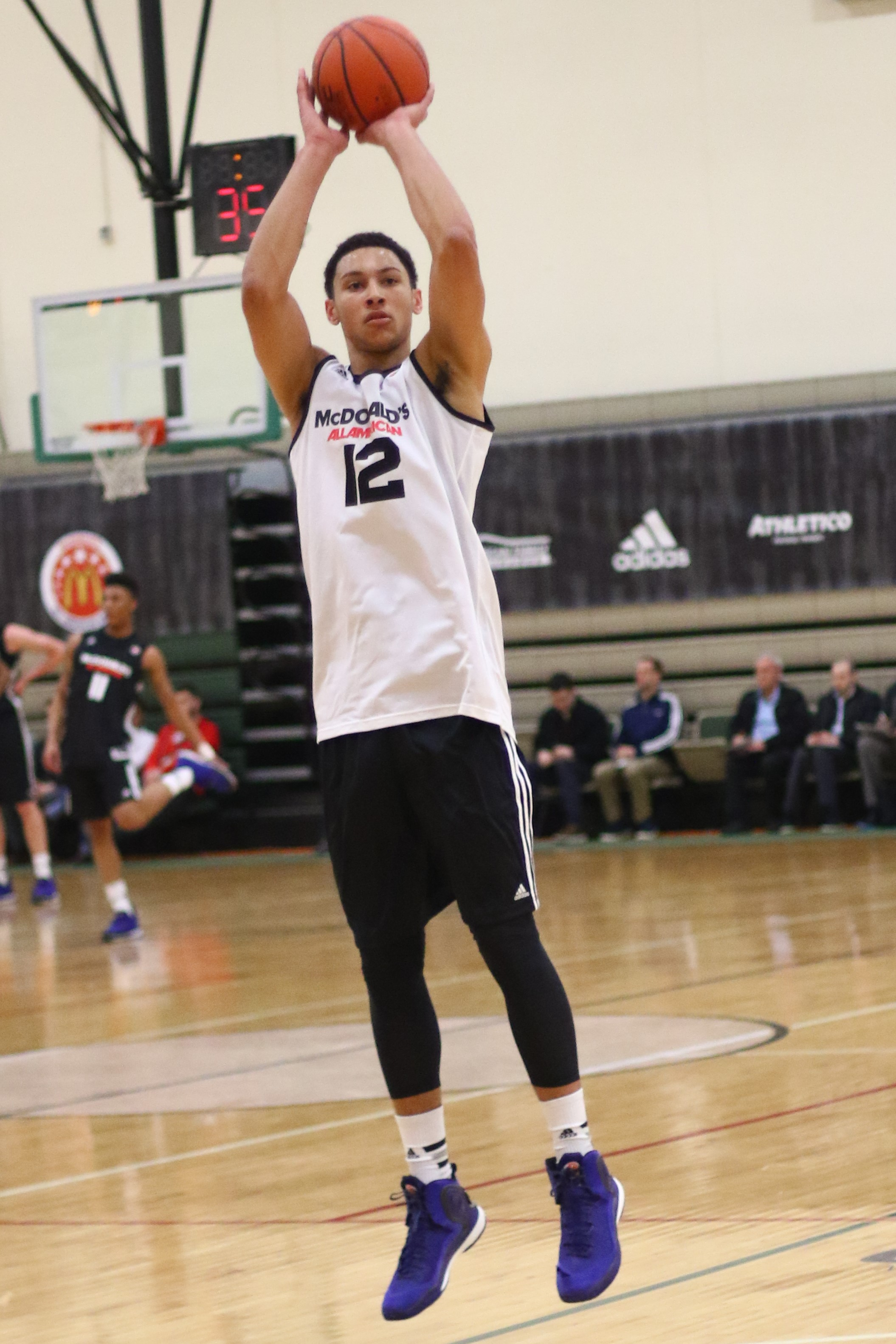
Simmons at a closed McDonald's All-American practice

After competing in the 2015 McDonald's All-American Game on 1 April, Simmons led Montverde Academy to a third consecutive High School National Tournament title with a 70–61 win over Oak Hill Academy on 4 April at Madison Square Garden. He again earned MVP honours after recording 58 points and 35 rebounds over the three-day tournament. He then competed in the 2015 Nike Hoop Summit for the World Team on 11 April and scored 13 points in a 103–101 win over Team USA.

Considered a five-star recruit by ESPN.com, Simmons was listed as the No. 1 power forward and the No. 1 player in the nation in 2015.

== College career ==
Entering his freshman year of college, Simmons began his career on a four-stop national tour in Australia with the LSU Tigers. The Tigers completed their five-game Australian tour with a 3–2 record, and over the five games, Simmons averaged 20 points and nine rebounds per game to lead the team in all major statistical categories. Upon returning to the United States, Simmons was featured on the Blue Ribbon College Basketball Yearbook 35th-anniversary cover, was named the SEC's Preseason Player of the Year, and earned Associated Press preseason All-America team honours. His Preseason Player of the Year honour made him just the second freshman to earn the award, joining Kentucky's Julius Randle in 2013, and his All-America team honour made him just the fourth freshman to be honoured on the preseason team.

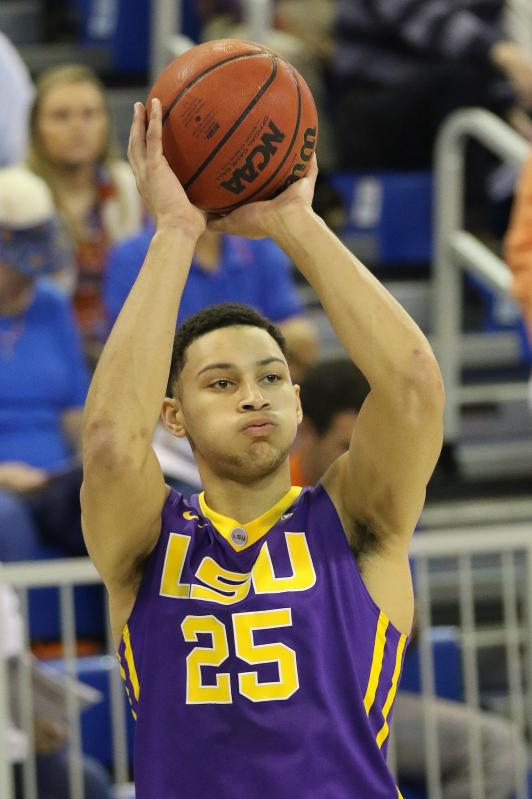
Simmons playing against Florida

On 13 November 2015, Simmons made his college debut in LSU's season opener, recording a double-double with 11 points and 13 rebounds as a starter in a win over McNeese State. On 2 December, he helped LSU break a three-game losing streak by recording 43 points, 14 rebounds, 7 assists, 5 steals, and 3 blocks in a 119–108 win over North Florida. His 43 points were the most for a Tigers player since Shaquille O'Neal had 43 against Northern Arizona on 28 December 1991. After recording 14 points and 10 rebounds in a win over Kentucky on 5 January 2016, Simmons was dubbed the best all-round player since LeBron James by NBA Hall of Famer Magic Johnson. Nine days later, Simmons came off the bench for the first time after being removed from LSU's starting line-up for their game against Tennessee due to academic reasons. Following the conclusion of the regular season, Simmons was named first-team All-Southeastern Conference and the league's Freshman of the Year on the 2016 Coaches SEC voting. He was also named to the eight-player All-SEC Freshman team.

After ranking No. 21 in the preseason AP Top 25 vote, LSU finished the regular season with an 18–13 record, including 11–7 in SEC play. As the fourth seed in the 2016 SEC tournament, LSU defeated Tennessee in the quarterfinals, but were defeated by Texas A&M in a demoralizing 71–38 semifinal loss, failing to receive an NCAA tournament berth. Simmons led the team in all major statistical categories except three-point shooting and free throw shooting, finishing with averages of 19.2 points, 11.8 rebounds, 4.8 assists, 2.0 steals, and 0.8 blocks in 34.9 minutes per game.

Following the announcement of the NCAA tournament field, with LSU failing to earn a bid, Tigers head coach Johnny Jones announced that the team would not play in any postseason tournament. On 21 March 2016, Simmons declared for the 2016 NBA draft, forgoing his final three years of college eligibility. He withdrew from school at the conclusion of the season with plans to move immediately to Phoenix, Arizona in advance of the NBA draft. He also signed with American sports agency Klutch Sports, which is primarily owned by Rich Paul.

== Professional career ==
=== Philadelphia 76ers (2016–2022) ===
==== 2016–17 season: Draft year injury ====
In the week leading up to the 2016 NBA draft, Simmons' attitude and character were questioned by a number of NBA media analysts. Philadelphia 76ers head coach Brett Brown, former Australian national team coach and a friend of the Simmons family, repudiated the claims being made and was content with Simmons' pre-draft behavior. On 23 June, he was selected by Brown and the 76ers with the number one overall pick in the 2016 draft, becoming the third Melbourne-born number one overall pick in 11 years (Andrew Bogut in 2005 and Kyrie Irving in 2011). He was also the first college player in the modern era to be selected with the first overall pick despite never playing in the NCAA tournament.

On 3 July 2016, Simmons signed his rookie scale contract with the 76ers and joined the team for the 2016 NBA Summer League. While he shot the ball poorly during his first three Summer League games, Simmons was praised for his court awareness and passing ability for a big man. He went on to be named in the All-Las Vegas Summer League First Team, and in six Summer League games, he averaged 10.8 points, 7.7 rebounds, and 5.5 assists per game.

On 30 September 2016, Simmons rolled his right ankle during the 76ers' final training camp scrimmage. After receiving an X-ray and MRI of the foot and ankle, it was determined that Simmons had fractured the fifth metatarsal bone of his right foot and was estimated to miss three to four months. On 24 February 2017, he was ruled out for the entire 2016–17 NBA season after tests revealed that his broken right foot had not fully healed.

==== 2017–18 season: Rookie of the Year ====
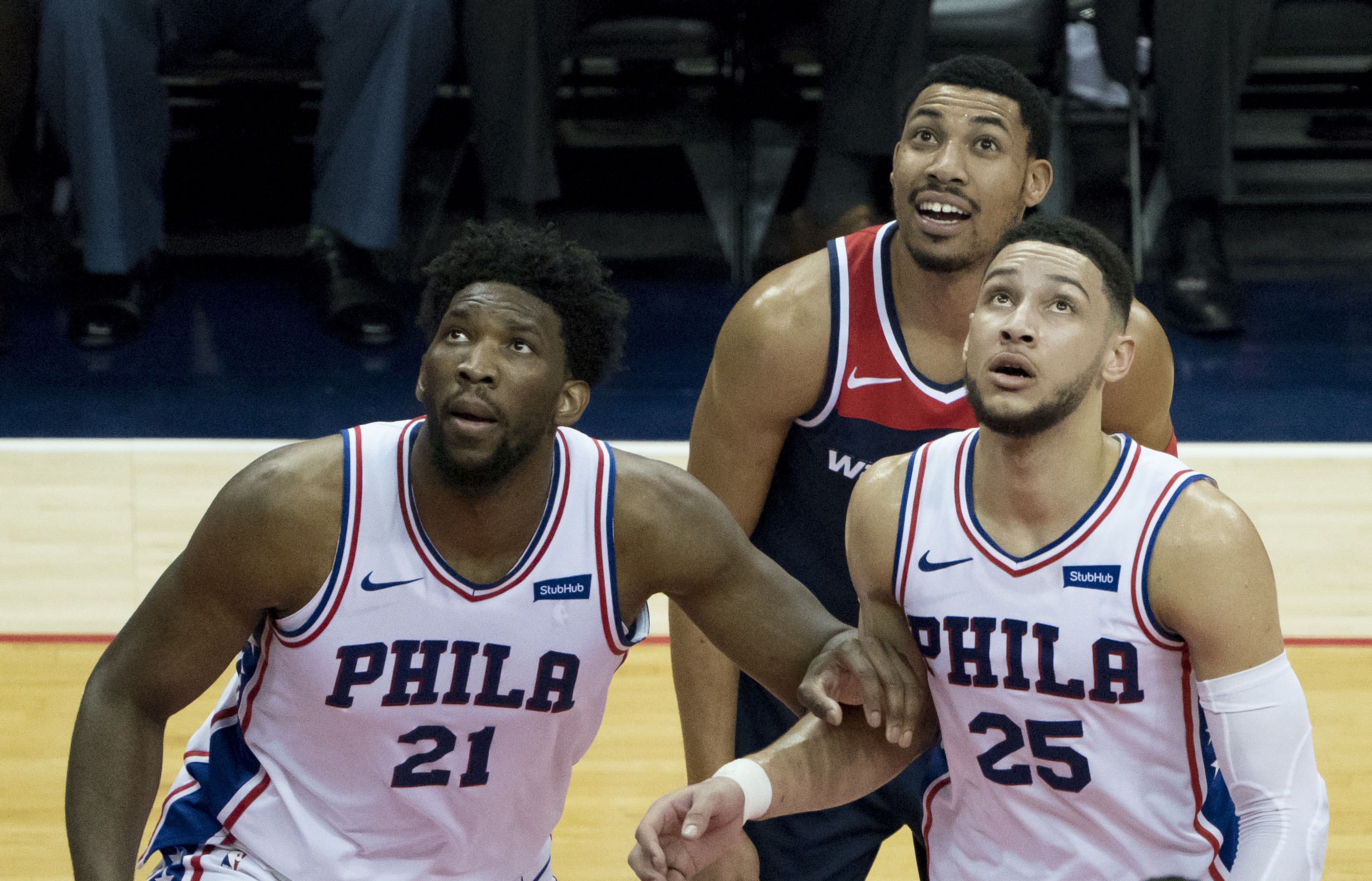
Simmons with teammate Joel Embiid in 2018

Some pundits doubted his strength, fitness, and scoring prowess after a full season on the sidelines, with only an outside chance for Rookie of the Year. In his NBA debut on 18 October 2017, Simmons had 18 points and 10 rebounds in a 120–115 season-opening loss to the Washington Wizards. In his third game, on 21 October, Simmons recorded 18 points, 10 rebounds, and eight assists in a 128–94 loss to the Toronto Raptors, joining Oscar Robertson as the only players ever to post 10-plus points, 10-plus rebounds, and 5-plus assists in their first three NBA games. In his fourth game, on 23 October, Simmons recorded his first career triple-double with 21 points, 12 rebounds, and 10 assists in a 97–86 win over the Detroit Pistons, becoming the third rookie after Robertson (1960) and Art Williams (1967) to record a triple-double in his first four games. He went on to become the only player in NBA history to begin a season with at least 170 points, 100 rebounds, and 80 assists in his team's first 10 games.

On 29 November, he had 31 points and a career-high 18 rebounds in a 118–113 win over the Wizards. On 22 February, he scored a career-high 32 points, making two free throws with 5.6 seconds left to complete Philadelphia's rally from five points down in the final minute as the 76ers beat the Chicago Bulls 116–115. On 15 March against the New York Knicks, Simmons recorded his second consecutive triple-double and joined Robertson and Magic Johnson as the third rookie in NBA history to reach 1,000 points, 500 rebounds, and 500 assists. His triple-double against the Knicks was his eighth of the season, thus entering second place for most triple-doubles in a rookie season, trailing only Robertson (26).

On 19 March against the Charlotte Hornets, Simmons recorded 11 points, 12 rebounds, and 15 assists, and he became the third rookie to have 0 turnovers in a triple-double game. On 24 March, he recorded his 10th triple-double of the season with 15 points, 12 rebounds, and 13 assists in a 120–108 win over the Minnesota Timberwolves. On 26 March, he had 11 assists in a 123–104 win over the Denver Nuggets, topping Allen Iverson (567) to set the team rookie record for assists. On 6 April, he had 27 points, 15 rebounds, and 13 assists in a 132–130 win over the Cleveland Cavaliers, leading the 76ers to their 13th straight win. He was subsequently named Eastern Conference Player of the Week for games played Monday 2 April to Sunday 8 April.

In the 76ers' penultimate game of the regular season on 10 April, the 76ers set a franchise record with their 15th consecutive victory following a 121–113 win over the Atlanta Hawks, with Simmons recording 13 points, 10 rebounds, and six assists. The 76ers finished the regular season with a 16th straight win to earn the Eastern Conference's No. 3 seed in the playoffs. Their record of 52–30 set the best team mark since 2001, when they went 56–26. At the conclusion of the regular season, Simmons was named the Eastern Conference Rookie of the Month for games played in March and April, earning the award for the third consecutive month and the fourth time overall.

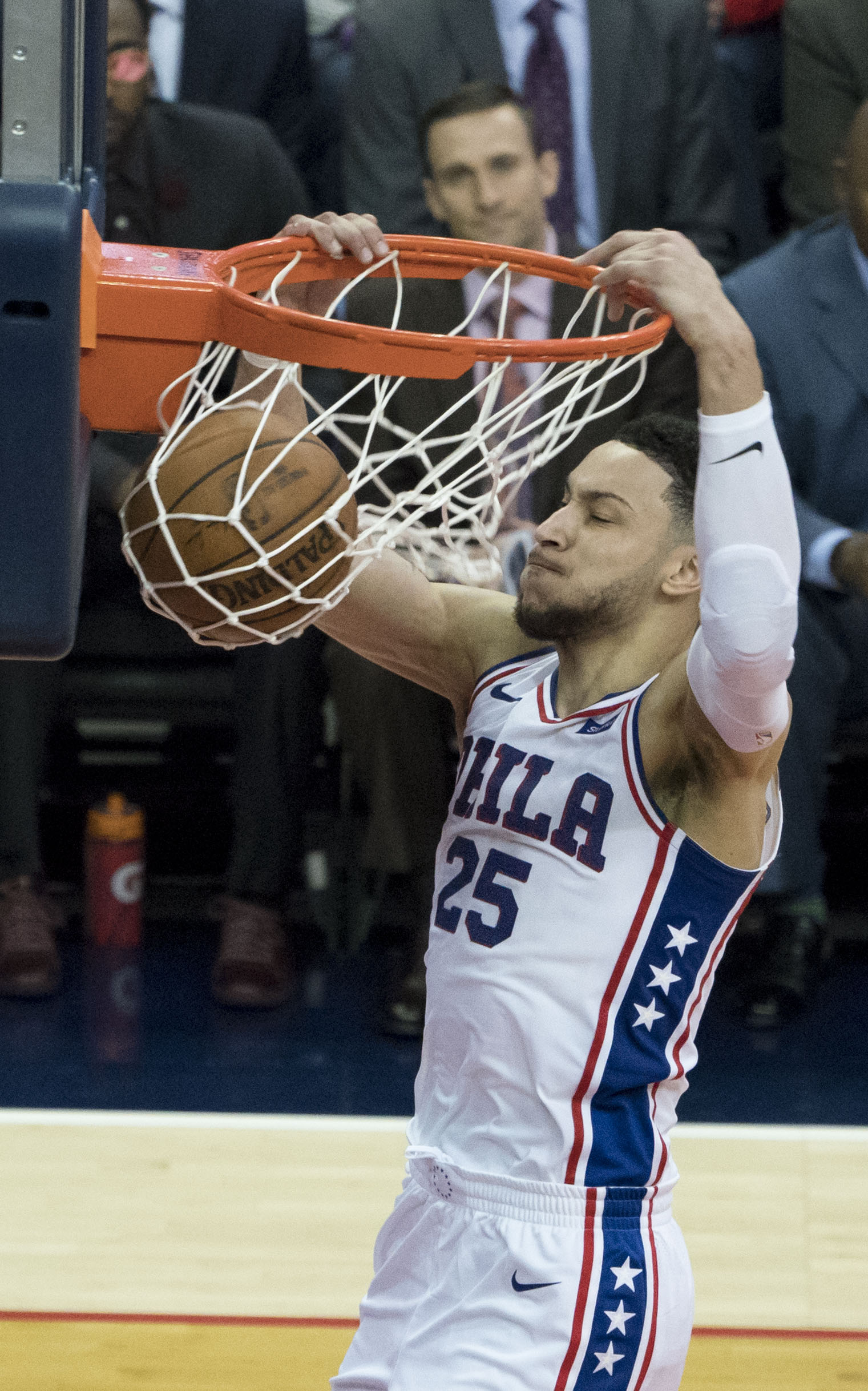
Simmons dunking in 2018

In his NBA playoff debut in game 1 of the 76ers' first-round playoff series against the Miami Heat, Simmons had 17 points, 14 assists, and nine rebounds in a 130–103 win. In game 4, Simmons helped the 76ers take a 3–1 lead in the series with 17 points, 13 rebounds, and 10 assists in a 106–102 win. He became the first rookie since Magic Johnson in 1980 to have a playoff triple-double, and became the fifth rookie with a triple-double in the playoffs, joining Johnson, Kareem Abdul-Jabbar, Jerry Lucas and Tom Gola. Simmons helped the 76ers move on to the second round of the playoffs with a 4–1 defeat of the Heat, as he recorded 14 points and 10 rebounds in a 104–91 win in game 5. The 76ers went on to lose in five games to the Boston Celtics in the second round, with Simmons recording 18 points, eight rebounds, and six assists in a 114–112 loss in game 5. At the season's end, Simmons was named the NBA Rookie of the Year and earned NBA All-Rookie First Team honours.

==== 2018–19 season: First All-Star selection ====
In September 2018, Simmons announced that during the off-season he began working to improve his shooting with his brother Liam Tribe-Simmons, former assistant coach for University of California, Riverside Highlanders men's basketball team and Southwest Baptist Bearcats men's basketball team, and would continue to do so for the remainder of the season. In the 76ers' season opener on 16 October 2018, Simmons recorded 19 points, 15 rebounds, and eight assists in a 105–87 loss to the Boston Celtics. Two days later, he had a triple-double with 13 points, 13 rebounds, and 11 assists in a 127–108 win over the Chicago Bulls. He reached his 13th career triple-double with 2:34 left in the third and became the first Sixer to ever get one in a home opener.

On 2 January, he scored 29 points in a 132–127 win over the Phoenix Suns. On 5 January, he recorded his sixth triple-double of the season with 20 points, 14 rebounds, and 11 assists in a 106–100 win over the Dallas Mavericks. On 11 January, he had 23 points, 15 assists, and 10 rebounds in a 123–121 loss to the Atlanta Hawks. Two days later, he had 20 points, 22 rebounds, and nine assists in a 108–105 win over the New York Knicks. On 15 January, with 20 points, 11 rebounds, and 9 assists against the Minnesota Timberwolves, Simmons became the second fastest player in NBA history to reach 2,000 points, 1,000 rebounds, and 1,000 assists, trailing only Oscar Robertson. Simmons reached this milestone in 125 games, which is 9 games faster than Magic Johnson and 33 games faster than LeBron James. On 23 January, he had 21 points, 15 assists, and 10 rebounds in a 122–120 win over the San Antonio Spurs. On 31 January, he received his first All-Star selection as an Eastern Conference reserve, becoming the first Australian to receive the honour. On 28 February, he recorded his ninth triple-double of the season with 11 points, 13 rebounds, and 11 assists in a 108–104 win over the Oklahoma City Thunder. Two days later, he had 25 points, 15 rebounds, and 11 assists in a 120–117 loss to the Golden State Warriors.

In game two of the 76ers' first-round playoff series against the Brooklyn Nets, Simmons had his second career postseason triple-double with 18 points, 12 assists, and 10 rebounds to lead Philadelphia to a 145–123 win. In game three of the series, Simmons scored a postseason career-high 31 points on 11-of-13 shooting in a 131–115 win over the Nets, putting the 76ers up 2–1 in the series.

==== 2019–20 season: First All-NBA and All-Defensive selections ====
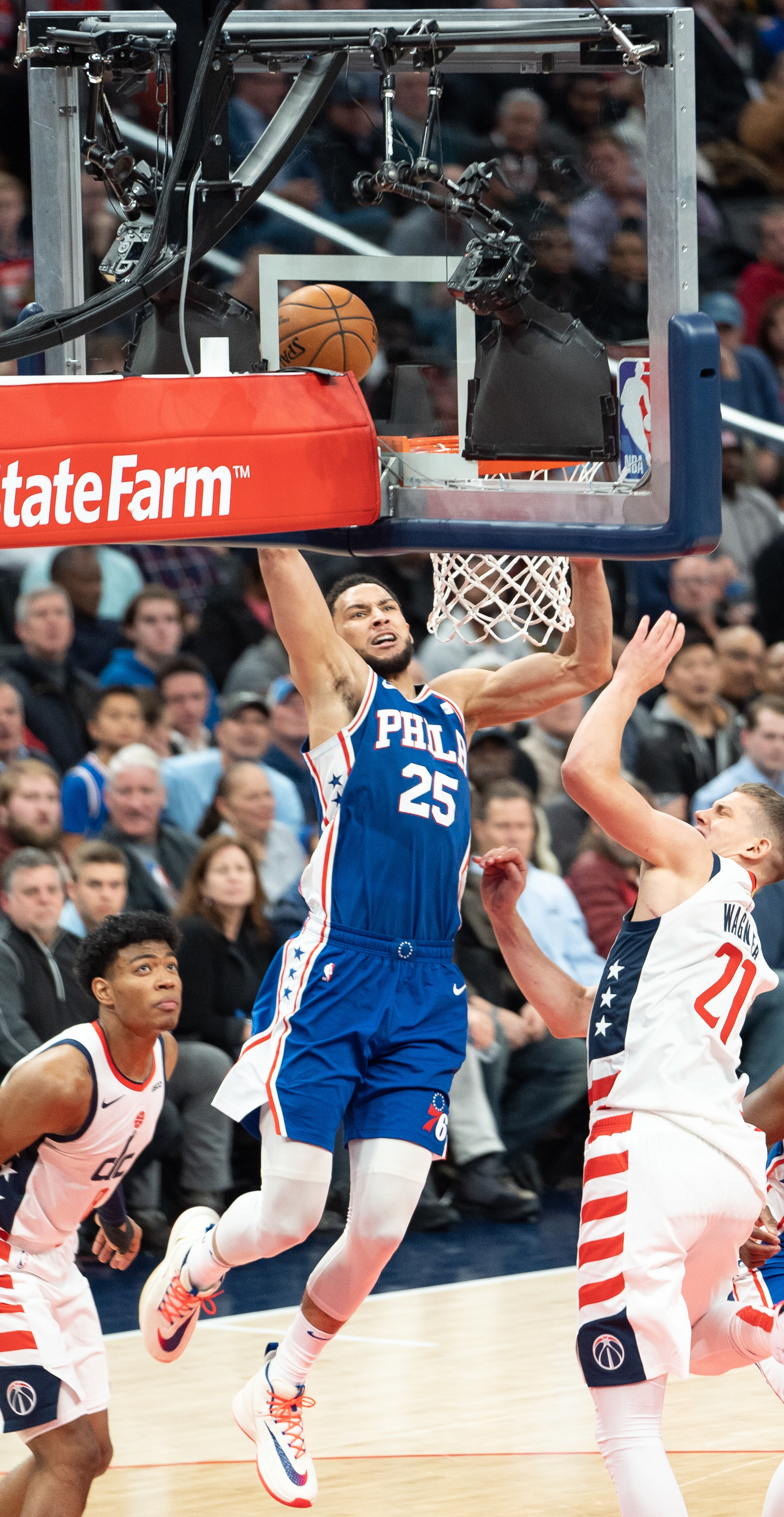
Simmons dunking the basketball against the Washington Wizards in 2019

On 15 July 2019, the 76ers and Simmons agreed to a $170 million, five-year contract extension. On 23 October 2019, in the 2019–20 NBA season opener against divisional rivals the Boston Celtics, Simmons scored 24 points on 68 percent shooting and recorded nine assists and eight rebounds in a 107–93 win. On 22 November, Simmons recorded his first triple-double of the season and his 24th of his career after recording 10 points, 10 rebounds, and 13 assists in a 115–104 win over the San Antonio Spurs. On 7 December, Simmons scored a career-high 34 points, while making 12 out of 14 shots, in a 141–94 win over the Cleveland Cavaliers, which included his second NBA career three-pointer. On 23 December, Simmons recorded yet another triple-double, this time completing the feat while recording a career high 17 assists, in a win over the Detroit Pistons.

By this time, Coach Brett Brown was publicly pushing Simmons to develop his shot. “This is what I want,” Brown told reporters in December. “You can pass it along to his agent, his family and friends: I want a 3-point shot a game, minimum. The pull-up 2s...I'm fine with whatever is open. But I'm interested in the 3-point shot.” But as the season progressed, Simmons did not follow through on Brown’s shooting demands. "I told Ben, 'If you aren't willing to shoot, then do I just bench you? Because I can do that,'" Brown later said.

On 20 January 2020, Simmons scored 34 points and recorded 12 assists and 12 rebounds in a 117–111 win over the Brooklyn Nets. On 30 January, it was announced Simmons had been awarded with his second All-Star appearance. Simmons was drafted by Team LeBron and went on to score 17 points, 5 assists, and 6 rebounds in a Team LeBron win. In a 22 February game against the Milwaukee Bucks, Simmons left the game in the first quarter with an apparent lower back injury. It was revealed Simmons had a nerve impingement in his lower back; the team listed him as "out for an extended period of time". Simmons was sidelined until the NBA returned after pausing play due to the COVID-19 pandemic. Simmons returned to play on 1 August 2020 during the NBA Bubble where he scored 19 points along with 13 rebounds and 4 assists in a loss to the Indiana Pacers. Simmons sat out the playoffs due to a knee injury, and the 76ers were eliminated 4–0 by the Boston Celtics.

At the end of the season, Simmons was the 2020 NBA steals leader, and was named to the All-NBA Third Team and the NBA All-Defensive First team.

==== 2020–21 season: Playoff disappointment ====
On 15 February 2021, Simmons recorded a double-double with a career-high 42 points and 12 assists in a 134–123 loss to the Utah Jazz. He finished the season averaging 14.3 points, 7.2 rebounds, and 6.9 assists per game.

During the playoffs, Simmons struggled at the free-throw line and became the worst free-throw shooter in postseason history with at least 67 attempts (34.2 percent), surpassing both Wilt Chamberlain (38 percent) and Shaquille O'Neal (37.4 percent). Following a Game 7 loss in the Eastern Conference semifinals against the Atlanta Hawks, Simmons came under heavy scrutiny due to his inability to shoot and lack of aggressiveness on offense. Simmons did not attempt a single shot in the final quarter in five out of the seven games, which many attributed to his lack of confidence in shooting free throws. He averaged 9.9 points, 6.3 rebounds, and 8.6 assists per game and shot 60 percent from the field and 33 percent (15-for-45) from the free throw line against the Hawks.

==== 2021–22 season: 76ers holdout ====
After the 76ers' Game 7 loss in the 2021 Eastern Conference Semifinals, Joel Embiid cited Simmons' decision to pass up an open dunk as the turning point in the game. A reporter asked 76ers coach Doc Rivers if Simmons could be a point guard on a championship team, to which Rivers responded: "I don't even know how to answer that right now."

In response to this and other factors, Simmons, despite having four years left on his contract, decided in August 2021 that he no longer wanted to be a member of the team. He declared his intentions to be traded, and noted that he was willing to miss training camp to enforce his trade demand. Simmons and company had also indicated that his play did not mesh effectively with that of Embiid and that their time as teammates had run its course. Embiid's public comments in response included calling Simmons' holdout and trade demands "borderline ... disrespectful" to the team, and that team management had built rosters around Simmons.

Simmons, as he had indicated, missed training camp. He also did not play in the preseason and even placed his Philadelphia home on the market for $3.1 million. His absence led to the 76ers organisation reportedly withholding and putting in escrow $8.25 million that would have otherwise been owed to him on 1 October, signifying over a quarter of the $31.59 million owed to him for the 2021–22 season.

Simmons returned to the team on 11 October 2021. On 19 October, Simmons was thrown out of practice by Rivers due to declining several times to substitute into a drill and was suspended by the 76ers for one game, the team's season-opener against the New Orleans Pelicans, due to conduct detrimental to the team. Simmons had previously been fined $1.4 million due to his absence from four preseason games, missed practices, on-court workouts, and meetings. After Simmons told the 76ers his absence was due to a mental health issue, team officials stopped fining him, but later resumed the fines after he continued to refuse to cooperate with them. Due to the repeated fines for missed games, Simmons became the most-fined player in NBA history, with reports suggesting he had surpassed $10 million by the end of 2021.

In January 2022, the 76ers reportedly had limited their fining of Simmons in response to him attending team meetings and counseling sessions, but continued to dock him for missed games. Simmons subsequently filed a grievance to recoup nearly $20 million in salary withheld from him by the 76ers, and the two sides settled in August 2022 for an undisclosed amount.

=== Brooklyn Nets (2022–2025) ===
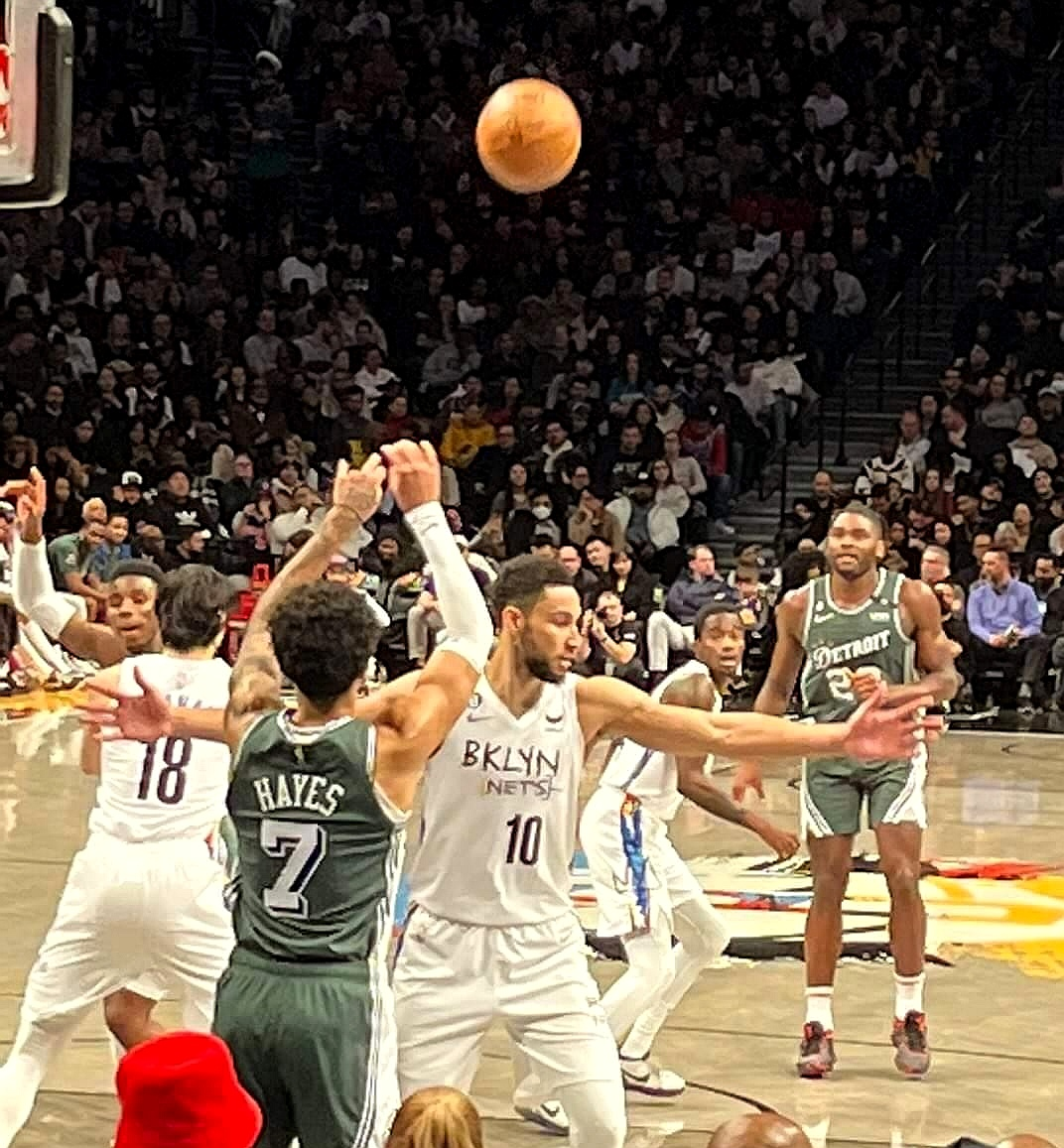
Simmons with the Brooklyn Nets against Detroit Pistons

On 10 February 2022, Simmons was traded, along with Andre Drummond, Seth Curry, and two future first-round picks, to the Brooklyn Nets in exchange for future teammate James Harden and Paul Millsap. On 21 March, Simmons was diagnosed with a herniated disk in his back. On 4 April, Nets head coach Steve Nash ruled out Simmons for the remainder of the regular season and the play-in tournament. On 21 April, Simmons reportedly planned to make his season debut in Game 4 against the Boston Celtics during the first round of the playoffs. On 24 April, with the Nets facing a sweep to the Celtics, the Nets announced that he would not play in Game 4 due to back soreness. The Nets lost the game, eliminating them from the playoffs. On 5 May, he underwent back surgery.

Simmons made his Nets debut on 19 October 2022, putting up four points, five rebounds, and five assists before fouling out in a 130–108 loss to the New Orleans Pelicans. On 17 November, he recorded a season-high 13 rebounds, alongside fifteen points, and seven assists, in a 109–107 win over the Portland Trail Blazers. Three days later, Simmons scored a season-high 22 points, alongside eight rebounds and five assists, in a 127–115 win over the Memphis Grizzlies. On 12 January 2023, he dished out a season-high 13 assists, alongside nine rebounds and two steals, in a 109–98 loss to the Boston Celtics. On 17 January, Simmons recorded his first triple-double as a Net, logging ten points, ten rebounds and eleven assists in a 106–98 loss to the San Antonio Spurs. In February 2023, Simmons had his knee drained and received a PRP injection for his ongoing left knee soreness, which he had dealt with during the season. On 5 March, Nets head coach Jacque Vaughn revealed that Simmons had an MRI that found inflammation in his back. On 16 March, Vaughn stated that Simmons had progressed to doing on-court work.

On 24 March, the Nets announced that Simmons had been diagnosed with a nerve impingement in his back and would be out indefinitely. The next day, Vaughn stated that Simmons would most likely not play for the rest of the season. On 28 March, Vaughn confirmed that the Nets would be shutting down Simmons for the remainder of the season due to a nerve issue in his back. During the 2022–23 season, Simmons posted career lows in minutes per game (26.3), points per game (6.9), rebounds per game (6.3), assists per game (6.1), and free throw percentage (43.9). ESPN described Simmons's performance as "a steep decline from his days as an All-Star".

After missing the first 38 games of the 2023–24 NBA season, Simmons made his season debut on 29 January 2024. In the game, he recorded 10 points, 11 assists, and 8 rebounds as the Nets defeated the Utah Jazz 147–114. Simmons played in only 15 games for the Nets, averaging 6.1 points, 7.9 rebounds, and 5.7 assists. On 7 March, the Nets announced that Simmons would miss the remainder of the season due to a nerve impingement in his lower back. On 15 March, he underwent a microscopic partial discectomy to alleviate the issue.

On 8 February 2025, Simmons was waived and the remainder of his contract was bought out by the Nets. Over the course of 3 seasons, the Nets paid Simmons $124 million for 90 games played.

=== Los Angeles Clippers (2025) ===
On 10 February 2025, Simmons signed with the Los Angeles Clippers. On 13 February, Simmons made his Clippers debut, putting up 12 points, seven rebounds, six assists, three steals, and one block in a 120–116 overtime win over the Utah Jazz. Simmons averaged 2.9 points, 3.8 rebounds and 3.1 assists per game in eighteen games played for the season. In the playoffs, he played in five of the team's seven games, averaging 8.4 minutes per game. Simmons became a free agent at the end of the season.

=== Sacramento Kings (2026–present) ===
On 8 September 2026, Simmons signed a one-year, $3.5 million contract with the Sacramento Kings after going unsigned for the entirety of the 2025–26 NBA season. On 18 October, Simmons suffered a ruptured right Achilles tendon during a Kings practice session; the injury is expected to sideline him for the entirety of the 2026–27 NBA season.

== National team career ==
=== Junior national team ===
Simmons represented Australia at the 2012 FIBA Under-17 World Championship at age 15, helping the team win a silver medal. Simmons' tournament highlights included a 26-point, 10-rebound, 5-steal outing against the Czech Republic.

=== Senior national team ===
Simmons made his senior debut for Australia in the 2013 FIBA Oceania Championship against New Zealand. He scored four total points in the two-game series and was a part of the gold medal-winning Australian team. In July 2014, Simmons was added to the Boomers extended squad for the 2014 FIBA Basketball World Cup, but did not make the final 12-man roster.

Since 2013, Simmons has verbally stated that he would play for Australia on multiple occasions (including the FIBA World Cup and the Olympics), but has always withdrawn from the team before competition. In August 2015, Simmons signaled his intentions to represent Australia at the 2016 Summer Olympics and said he was aiming to win a medal. In April 2016, Simmons withdrew from the team in order to prepare for his rookie season in the NBA. On 15 May 2019, Simmons confirmed he would represent Australia in the 2019 FIBA World Cup and multiple exhibition games against Canada and the United States. In July 2019, Simmons announced that he would not play for the Australian national team in 2019, citing "professional obligations".

In October 2017, Simmons made clear his intentions to represent Australia at the 2020 Summer Olympics however, he withdrew from the Australia Olympic squad in June 2021, stating that he was focusing improving his shooting skills for the 2021–22 NBA season. Simmons was not included in Australia's preliminary team selection pool for the 2023 FIBA World Cup but was given an open invitation to attend selection camp by head coach Brian Goorjian; he ultimately ruled himself out to focus on rehabilitation from an ongoing back injury. In August 2023, Simmons declared his intent to join the Australian team for the 2024 Summer Olympics; he was not included in the preliminary team selection pool announced in April 2024 due to back problems.

In August 2026, it was reported that Simmons is planning to join Australia national team's private minicamp, eyeing a potential NBA comeback.

== Career statistics ==
Legend
GP	Games played	GS	Games started	MPG	Minutes per game
FG%	Field goal percentage	3P%	3-point field goal percentage	FT%	Free throw percentage
RPG	Rebounds per game	APG	Assists per game	SPG	Steals per game
BPG	Blocks per game	PPG	Points per game	**Bold**	Career high
*	Led the league

=== NBA ===
==== Regular season ====
Year	Team	GP	GS	MPG	FG%	3P%	FT%	RPG	APG	SPG	BPG	PPG
2017–18	Philadelphia	**81**	**81**	33.7	.545	.000	.560	8.1	**8.2**	1.7	**.9**	15.8
2018–19	Philadelphia	79	79	34.2	.563	.000	.600	**8.8**	7.7	1.4	.8	**16.9**
2019–20	Philadelphia	57	57	**35.4**	.580	.286	.621	7.8	8.0	**2.1***	.6	16.4
2020–21	Philadelphia	58	58	32.4	.557	**.300**	.613	7.2	6.9	1.6	.6	14.3
2022–23	Brooklyn	42	33	26.3	.566	.000	.439	6.3	6.1	1.3	.6	6.9
2023–24	Brooklyn	15	12	23.9	**.581**	—	.400	7.9	5.7	.8	.6	6.1
2024–25	Brooklyn	33	24	25.0	.547	—	.692	5.2	6.9	.8	.5	6.2
2024–25	L.A. Clippers	17	0	16.4	.434	—	**.857**	3.8	3.1	.7	.4	2.9
Career		383	344	31.1	.558	.139	.592	7.4	7.2	1.5	.7	13.1
All-Star		2	0	23.0	.923	—	.500	6.0	6.0	1.5	.5	13.5

==== Playoffs ====
Year	Team	GP	GS	MPG	FG%	3P%	FT%	RPG	APG	SPG	BPG	PPG
2018	Philadelphia	10	10	**36.9**	.488	.000	**.707**	**9.4**	7.7	**1.7**	.8	**16.3**
2019	Philadelphia	**12**	**12**	35.1	**.621**	—	.575	7.1	6.0	1.3	**1.0**	13.9
2021	Philadelphia	**12**	**12**	33.5	**.621**	.000	.342	7.9	**8.8**	1.3	.8	11.9
2025	L.A. Clippers	5	0	8.4	.333	—	—	1.4	.8	.2	.8	.8
Career		39	34	31.6	.567	.000	.520	7.2	6.6	1.2	.9	12.2

=== College ===
Year	Team	GP	GS	MPG	FG%	3P%	FT%	RPG	APG	SPG	BPG	PPG
2015–16	LSU	33	32	34.9	.560	.333	.670	11.8	4.8	2.0	.8	19.2

== Personal life ==
In the summer of 2018, Simmons' brother Liam resigned his position as assistant coach at the University of California, Riverside, to work with Simmons on improving his shooting game. The decision to hire his brother as his shooting coach was not without controversy or criticism. His sister Emily, a former member of the Washington State University women's rowing team, who has worked for Klutch Sports since 2014, is married to former NFL player Michael Bush. His godfather, David Patrick, was an assistant coach at LSU and was a part of his sole season there and was the head coach at Sacramento State. A cousin of Simmons, who had attended the 2016 NBA draft, was killed in a hit-and-run on 25 June 2016 in New Jersey.

In November 2016, Simmons was featured in the Showtime documentary film One & Done, providing an insight into his time as a one-and-done college player, as well as exploring his and his family's thoughts on the NCAA and the NBA's "one and done" rule. On 7 June 2016, Simmons signed an endorsement deal with Nike. Simmons was in a relationship with American singer Tinashe from November 2017 to May 2018.

On 3 October 2020, Simmons announced his endorsement for Joe Biden and Kamala Harris for the 2020 United States presidential election. Over the 2021 Christmas holiday, Simmons reportedly became engaged to British television personality Maya Jama. In August 2022, the couple reportedly ended their engagement.

In December 2025, Simmons became the controlling operator of the South Florida Sails professional angling club after obtaining a 50% ownership stake in the club. Simmons is a supporter of the Essendon Football Club, an Australian rules football team in the Australian Football League, and the Newcastle Knights of the National Rugby League.

== See also ==
- List of NBA players born outside the United States
- List of NBA career field goal percentage leaders
- List of NBA career triple-double leaders
- List of NBA career playoff triple-double leaders
