= San Diego Christian College =

Private evangelical college in Santee, California

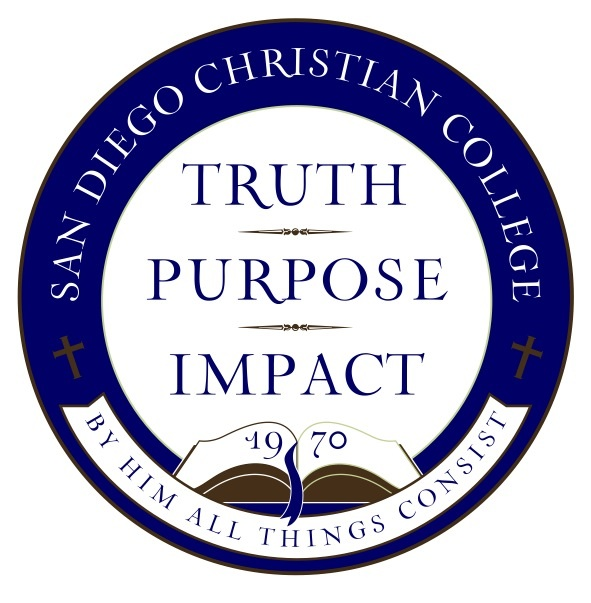
- Former name: Christian Heritage College (1970–2005)
- Type: Private university
- Established: 1970
- Religious affiliation: Non-denominational Christian
- Academic affiliations: Council for Christian Colleges and Universities (CCCU) Association of Independent California Colleges and Universities (AICCU)
- President: David Poole
- Students: 681
- Location: San Diego, California, U.S. 32°44′3″N 117°12′59″W
- Campus: Suburban
- Colors: Navy Blue, Sky Blue & Gold
- Nickname: Hawks
- Sporting affiliations: NAIA – GSAC
- Mascot: Moe Hawk
- Website: www.sdcc.edu

San Diego Christian College (SDCC) is a private evangelical university in San Diego, California. Founded in 1970, SDCC offers traditional, non-traditional, and graduate programs.

== History ==
In January 1970, Tim F. LaHaye, pastor of the former Scott Memorial Baptist Church of San Diego and co-author of the Left Behind series of books, Art Peters, and Henry M. Morris discussed the need for a Christian college on the West Coast where studies could be developed within the framework of creationism based on the Genesis creation narrative. That year, classes began at Christian Heritage College, supported by Scott Memorial Baptist Church. The first degrees were awarded in 1973.

In 1984, it was first accredited by the Western Association of Schools and Colleges (WASC). In 2005, the college changed its name to San Diego Christian College. In 2015, it moved to its new location in Santee, California.

== Campus ==
In 2005, Christian Heritage College became San Diego Christian College and in 2014, SDCC moved to its new campus in Santee. The new campus consists of five buildings, with an athletic annex office and residential apartments which are located 1.8 miles off campus.

Its five buildings include smart classrooms, laboratories, chapel auditorium, cafeteria, counseling rooms, a library and faculty and staff offices. The library has a growing collection of over 450,000 items. Aviators train at Gillespie Field in El Cajon.

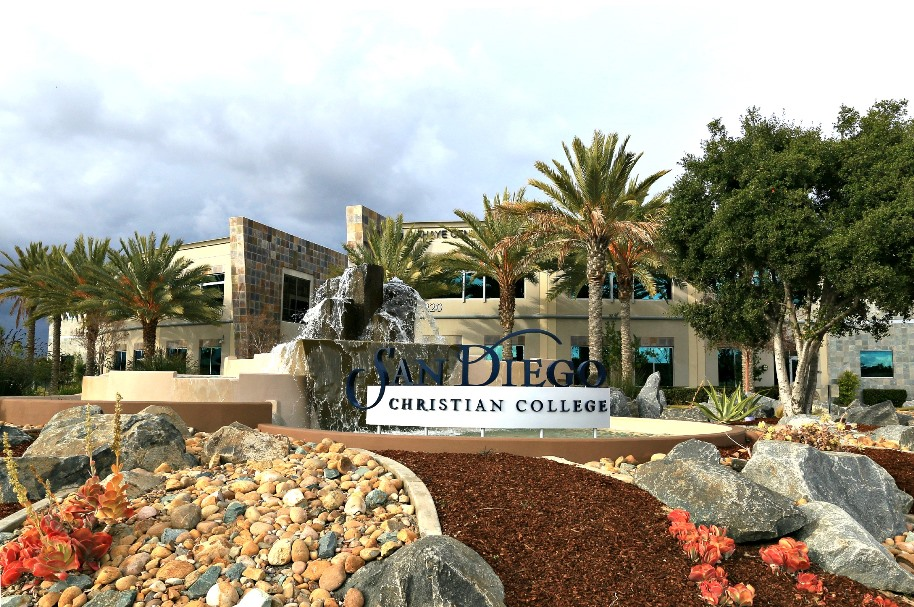

SDCC's fountain displays the institution's core values of truth, purpose, and impact.

== Academics ==
The institution offers Associate of Arts, Bachelor of Arts, Bachelor of Science degrees as well as Master of Arts and Master of Science degrees and teaching credentials.

San Diego Christian College has been accredited by the Western Association of Schools and Colleges (WASC) or its successor the WASC Senior College and University Commission since 1984. On June 23, 2006, WASC reviewed San Diego Christian College and placed its accreditation on probation. This was because the institution was unable to demonstrate its "autonomy". The commission on February 2, 2007, found the institution had taken a "number of significant and positive steps" in addressing its concerns but still found it to be in noncompliance so another visit was scheduled for the spring of 2008. In June 2008, San Diego Christian College received a reaffirmation of accreditation.

In its 2024 rankings, U.S. News & World Report ranked San Diego Christian College as #98 in its "Regional Universities West" category.

== Athletics ==
The San Diego Christian College (SDCC) athletic teams were called the Hawks. The institution was a member of the National Association of Intercollegiate Athletics (NAIA), primarily competing in the Golden State Athletic Conference (GSAC) from 1999–2000 to 2022–23 (the final season before discontinuing its athletics program). The Hawks were also a member of the National Christian College Athletic Association (NCCAA), primarily competing as an independent in the West Region of the Division I level.

SDCC competed in 14 intercollegiate varsity teams: Men's sports included baseball, basketball, cross country, golf, soccer and tennis; while women's sports included basketball, beach volleyball, cross country, golf, soccer, softball, tennis and volleyball.

=== Tennis ===
In just their first year of a program in 2015, the SDCC men's tennis team went to the NAIA National Tournament held in Mobile, Ala. The Hawks lost in the Quarterfinal round against eventual winner and No. 1 team Georgia Gwinnett. The Hawks were ranked as high as No. 8 in the NAIA Top 25 Poll during the season.

=== Baseball ===
In 2014, the SDCC baseball team was a finalist in the NAIA World Series after a record breaking year. The Hawks finished with a 42–20 overall record that included a GSAC Regular Season Championship as well as being ranked fifth in the NAIA Top 25 Poll.

=== Men's basketball ===
Competing at that time in the NCCAA, the Hawks won the NCCAA men's basketball championship in 1990, 1997, 1998 and 2004. They were second in 2000, losing to Bethel by a score of 83–82. They finished third in 1996 and 2003. They also went to the 2001 NAIA Final Four in that sport.

=== Women's basketball ===
The Hawks won the NCCAA women's basketball championship in 2003.

=== Volleyball ===
The Hawks women's volleyball team won the first national titles for the school in that sport in 1998 and 2000, and took second in 1996 and 1999.

== Notable people ==
=== Students and alumni ===
Name	Known for	Relationship to school
Matt Krause	Member of the Texas House of Representatives since 2013; lawyer from Fort Worth, Texas	Hawks basketball player, 1998–2002
Shannon Taylor	Emmy Award-winning film producer. Also, musician and actress	BA degree in Communications-2009
Jeremiah Trueman	New Zealand basketball player	
Liam Simmons	Collegiate basketball head coach	Graduated in 2007, played guard for three years

=== Faculty and employees ===
Name	Known for	Relationship to school
Duane Gish	Speaker on creationism	Researcher when the Institute for Creation Research was part of the college in the 1970s.
Swen Nater	Former NBA basketball player	Coached SDCC's basketball team from 1985 to 1995
