= Franklin Pool and Leisure Centre =

Leisure centre in New Zealand

- Interactive map of Franklin Pool and Leisure Centre
- Former names: Franklin Rec Centre
- Address: 29 Franklin Road, Pukekohe, Pukekohe Hill 2120, New Zealand
- Location: Pukekohe, New Zealand
- Coordinates: 37.1953609°S 174.9074619°E
- Capacity: 1,100

Tenant
- Franklin Bulls (NZNBL) (2020–present)

Website
- www.franklinleisure.co.nz

The Franklin Pool and Leisure Centre is a multi purpose leisure centre in Pukekohe, New Zealand, formally known as the Franklin Rec centre to locals. The centre now has facilities that include a fully equipped gym with strength and cardio equipment, a dedicated cardio space, functional training area, a group exercise and cycle studio with over 30 classes to enjoy. An indoor 25m pool with children’s splash area, dedicated learn to swim pool and sauna facilities were added in.

It is home to the Pukekohe Swimming Club, Franklin Basketball Association and the Franklin Bulls from the New Zealand National Basketball League. It has since picked up the nickname of "The Stockyard" during their games.

In May 2021, the New Zealand Breakers announced that they would play a regular season Australian National Basketball League game on 28 May at the venue. The game saw the Illawarra Hawks beat the New Zealand Breakers by 11 points. It was also the temporary home to the Indian Panthers.
