= Liam Simmons =

American basketball player and coach

Colorado Christian Cougars
- Title: Head coach
- League: RMAC

Personal information
- Born: July 1983 (age 43) Australia

Career information
- College: San Diego Christian (2004–2007)
- Position: Guard
- Coaching career: 2009–present

Career history

Coaching
- 2009–2011: Northwest Christian (assistant)
- 2011–2012: Northwest Christian
- 2013–2014: Nicholls State (assistant)
- 2015–2018: Southwest Baptist (assistant)
- 2018: UC Riverside (assistant)
- 2020: Franklin Bulls
- 2020–present: Colorado Christian

Liam Tribe-Simmons (born July 1983) is an Australian basketball coach and former player who is head men's basketball coach at Colorado Christian University.

== Early life ==
Simmons was born in Australia. His parents divorced after having four children. His mother, Julie, subsequently married David Simmons, an American ex-patriate professional basketball player who played in the Australian NBL for 14 years. They had two children, Olivia and Ben Simmons, a player in the NBA. In Australia Liam Simmons played for several teams, including the Newcastle Hunters U23 team and New South Wales U20 team. He graduated from San Diego Christian College in 2007 with a degree in kinesiology and obtained a master's degree in education from Australian Catholic University in 2008. He played as a guard for three years at San Diego Christian and was a member of their NCCAA championship team.

== Coaching career ==
He began his coaching career as an assistant with Newcastle, working with the U18 and U14 teams in 2006 and 2007. After graduation he returned to the United States in 2009, coaching at Northwest Christian School in Phoenix, Arizona for three years, the last as head coach. His first college coaching job was in 2013 for one year as an assistant at Nicholls State University; this was followed by four years at Southwest Baptist University, where he became assistant head coach for the 2017–18 season. In 2018 he joined U.C. Riverside for a few months as an assistant coach. He gave it up to work with his brother Ben full-time to improve his foul shooting and jump shot. This was a situation not without controversy. The team had chosen coach John Townsend to work with Simmons. Simmons' choice of his brother has been described as puzzling; the team was reported to be "utterly disappointed" that he decided to go in that direction. He returned Down Under and to the coaching ranks in early 2020, signing as head coach of the Franklin Bulls of the New Zealand NBL. COVID-19 restrictions led to the 2020 season being suspended and the Bulls subsequently released Simmons to take up a role in the United States. However, he later returned to the Bulls to coach them in the NBL Showdown Hub season in Auckland in July 2020.

Beginning with the 2020–21 U.S. college season, Simmons has coached the Colorado Christian University basketball team. In his first season as coach, the D2 Colorado Christian Cougars had a record of 4–14.
