= Dan Fotu =

New Zealand basketball player

No. 42 – Bank of Taiwan
- Position: Forward
- League: Super Basketball League

Personal information
- Born: 24 July 1999 (age 27) York, England
- Listed height: 201 cm (6 ft 7 in)
- Listed weight: 101 kg (223 lb)

Career information
- High school: Rangitoto College (Auckland, New Zealand)
- College: Saint Mary's (2018–2022)
- NBA draft: 2022: undrafted
- Playing career: 2017–present

Career history
- 2017–2018: New Zealand Breakers
- 2022: Auckland Tuatara
- 2022–2024: New Zealand Breakers
- 2023: Franklin Bulls
- 2024: Nelson Giants
- 2024–2026: Gifu Swoops
- 2025: Auckland Tuatara
- 2026–present: Bank of Taiwan

Daniel Joeli Fotu (born 24 July 1999) is a New Zealand professional basketball player for the Bank of Taiwan of the Super Basketball League. Fotu debuted for the New Zealand Breakers of the Australian National Basketball League (NBL) in the 2017–18 season before playing four years of college basketball in the United States for the Saint Mary's Gaels. He returned to New Zealand in 2022 to play for the Breakers and to play in the New Zealand National Basketball League (NZNBL). In 2024, he moved to Japan to play for Gifu Swoops. He also represents the New Zealand national team in international competition.

== Early life and career ==
Fotu was born in York, England, to a Tongan father and an English mother. He briefly lived in England alongside his two older siblings, Isaac and Ella, before the family moved to New Zealand. He grew up in the Auckland region of North Shore.

Fotu attended Rangitoto College in Auckland, where he helped the college win the national schools championship in 2015 and 2016 and then earn a runner-up finish in 2017. His junior association was North Harbour Basketball and he joined the New Zealand Breakers academy at age 14.

In August 2017, Fotu joined the New Zealand Breakers of the Australian National Basketball League (NBL) as a non-contracted development player for the 2017–18 season, maintaining his amateur status for U.S. colleges. He made one appearance for the Breakers during the season.

== College career ==
Fotu moved to the United States in 2018 to play college basketball for the Saint Mary's Gaels of the West Coast Conference in the NCAA Division I.

As a freshman in 2018–19, Fotu appeared in all 34 games and made four starts, averaging 2.8 points in 13.8 minutes per game. He scored a season-high 16 points against Cal on 1 December 2018.

As a sophomore in 2019–20, Fotu was one of three Gaels to play every game during the season and also made 19 starts, averaging 6.4 points and 3.4 rebounds in 20.5 minutes per game. He scored a season-high 17 points against Seattle on 28 December 2019.

As a junior in 2020–21, Fotu started all 24 games and averaged 8.4 points and 5.2 rebounds in 23.7 minutes per game. He scored a season-high 16 points against Loyola Marymount on 21 January 2021.

As a senior in 2021–22, Fotu appeared in all 34 games for the Gaels off the bench, averaging 6.3 points and 3.0 rebounds in 13.9 minutes per game. He scored a career-high 22 points in the Maui Invitational in a win over Notre Dame on 22 November 2021, including the go-ahead three-pointer with less than a minute remaining in the game. He was subsequently named to the Maui Invitational all-tournament team and earned West Coast Conference player of the week honours. He recorded seven points and five rebounds in the Gaels' NCAA Tournament win over Indiana.

In 126 career games, Fotu averaged 5.8 points and 3.4 rebounds per game. He graduated from Saint Mary's with a Bachelor of Business Administration degree.

== Professional career ==
In April 2022, Fotu signed with the Auckland Tuatara of the New Zealand National Basketball League (NZNBL). He appeared in three games for the Tuatara during the 2022 season before suffering a major knee injury.

On 15 May 2022, Fotu signed a two-year deal with the New Zealand Breakers, returning to the club for a second stint. In 14 games during the 2022–23 NBL season, he averaged 1.1 points in 2.7 minutes per game.

Fotu joined the Franklin Bulls for the 2023 New Zealand NBL season. On 23 June, he scored a career-high 31 points in a 100–89 win over the Wellington Saints. In 18 games, he averaged 17.8 points, 6.7 rebounds, 1.6 assists and 1.2 steals per game.

With the Breakers in the 2023–24 NBL season, Fotu averaged 2.8 points and 1.5 rebounds in 7.9 minutes across eight games.

Fotu joined the Nelson Giants for the 2024 New Zealand NBL season. In 19 games, he averaged 18.6 points, 6.3 rebounds, 2.1 assists and 1.7 steals per game.

On 9 July 2024, Fotu signed with Gifu Swoops of the Japanese B.League third division. In 53 games during the 2024–25 season, he averaged 10.8 points, 4.9 rebounds and 1.5 assists per game.

Fotu returned to the Auckland Tuatara for the 2025 New Zealand NBL season. In nine games, he averaged 7.8 points, 6.1 rebounds and 2.6 assists per game.

On 12 June 2025, Fotu re-signed with Gifu Swoops for the 2025–26 season. In 51 games, he averaged 11.1 points, 6.0 rebounds, 1.1 assists and 1.2 steals per game.

In October 2026, Fotu joined the Bank of Taiwan of the Super Basketball League.

== National team career ==
Fotu debuted for the New Zealand Junior Tall Blacks in 2015 at the FIBA Under-16 Oceania Championship. He continued with the Junior Tall Blacks in 2016 at the FIBA Oceania Under-18 Championship, averaging 7.5 points and 5.0 rebounds in helping the team win the gold medal.

Fotu debuted for the Tall Blacks in 2018 and played alongside his brother Isaac. He played for the Tall Blacks during the 2019 FIBA Basketball World Cup Asian qualifiers, 2023 FIBA Basketball World Cup Asian qualifiers, and 2025 FIBA Asia Cup qualifiers.

== Personal life ==
Fotu is the son of Manu and Jenny, and he has three siblings: older brother Isaac, older sister Ella, and younger brother Jacob. Isaac and Ella have represented the Tall Blacks and Tall Ferns respectively. His father played professional rugby in England.

Fotu holds dual New Zealand-British nationality.
