= Matthew Freeman (twirler) =

American baton twirler (born 1992)

Matthew Freeman (born April 8, 1992 in Lancaster, California) is a World Twirling Championships Rhythmic Gold Medalist and lead baton twirler for the Penn State Nittany Lions. On October 24, 2010, he was voted to be on the cover of Twirl Magazine. He is a 6 time NBTA World Champion and continues to be one of the most influential ambassadors of the sport.

He began twirling at the age of two years, and in order to avoid any ridicule, he kept his twirling secret until he decided to go public in high school. He graduated from Penn State in Spring of 2014 and led the football team and Blue Band onto the field at every home game. He was the only male to try out for the feature baton twirler at Penn State and beat out six females for the spot.

He has a brother, Tim, and a sister, Katie.
