= Matt Freeman (basketball) =

New Zealand basketball player (born 1997)

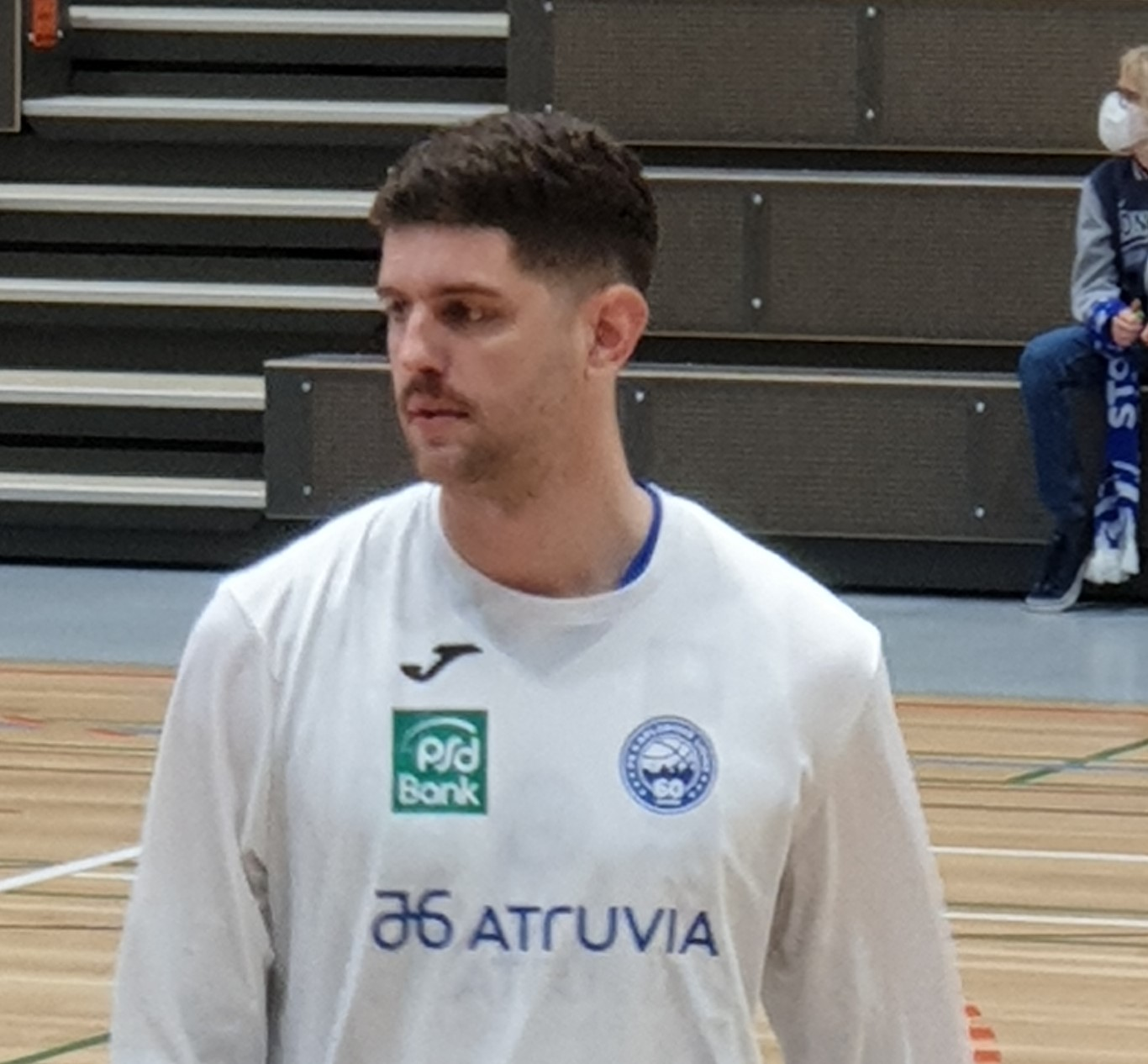
- Freeman with Karlsruhe in December 2021

No. 9 – Franklin Bulls
- Position: Power forward
- League: NZNBL

Personal information
- Born: 9 December 1997 (age 28) Auckland, New Zealand
- Listed height: 2.07 m (6 ft 9 in)
- Listed weight: 100 kg (220 lb)

Career information
- High school: Westlake Boys (Auckland, New Zealand)
- College: Oklahoma (2016–2019); UC Santa Barbara (2019–2020)
- NBA draft: 2020: undrafted
- Playing career: 2020–present

Career history
- 2020–2021: Gladiators Trier
- 2021–2022: PS Karlsruhe Lions
- 2022–2023: Eisbären Bremerhaven
- 2023: Franklin Bulls
- 2023–2024: SCM U Craiova
- 2024–2025: Budapesti Honvéd SE
- 2026–present: Franklin Bulls

Matthew Jon Freeman (born 9 December 1997) is a New Zealand professional basketball player for the Franklin Bulls of the New Zealand National Basketball League (NZNBL). He played college basketball for the Oklahoma Sooners and UC Santa Barbara Gauchos.

== Early life ==
Freeman was born in Auckland, New Zealand. He attended Westlake Boys High School.

== College career ==
In January 2016, Freeman enrolled at the University of Oklahoma. He played three seasons for the Sooners between 2016 and 2019.

In April 2019, Freeman transferred to UC Santa Barbara.

As a senior with the Gauchos in 2019–20, Freeman averaged 9.4 points per game.

== Professional career ==
In December 2020, Freeman moved to Germany to begin his professional career with Gladiators Trier of the ProA. In 14 games in 2020–21, he averaged 11.8 points, 3.5 rebounds and 1.3 assists per game. He was set to play for the Franklin Bulls in the 2021 New Zealand NBL season, but he was unable to debut due to injury.

In September 2021, Freeman signed with PS Karlsruhe Lions for the 2021–22 ProA season. In 34 games, he averaged 10.3 points, 4.6 rebounds and 1.4 assists per game.

For the 2022–23 season, Freeman joined Eisbären Bremerhaven. In 38 games, he averaged 9.3 points, 5.3 rebounds and 1.7 assists per game.

On 22 May 2023, Freeman signed with the Franklin Bulls for the rest of the 2023 New Zealand NBL season. In 10 games, he averaged 7.5 points, 3.0 rebounds, 1.2 assists and 1.1 steals per game.

On 3 August 2023, Freeman signed with SCM U Craiova of the Romanian Liga Națională. In 29 games, he averaged 11.2 points, 5.3 rebounds and 1.3 assists per game.

In December 2024, Freeman joined Budapesti Honvéd SE of the Hungarian Nemzeti Bajnokság I/A. In 26 games in 2024–25, he averaged 10.3 points, 5.5 rebounds and 1.8 assists per game.

On 8 March 2026, Freeman signed with the Franklin Bulls for the 2026 New Zealand NBL season, returning to the team for a second stint.

== National team career ==
Freeman played for New Zealand at the 2013 FIBA Oceania U16 Championship and the 2014 FIBA Oceania U18 Championship. In 2015, he helped New Zealand win gold at the 2015 FIBA Under-18 3x3 World Championship.
