= Franklin Bulls =

Basketball team in Pukekohe, New Zealand

- League: NZNBL
- Founded: November 2019
- History: 2020–present
- Arena: Franklin Pool and Leisure Centre
- Location: Pukekohe, New Zealand
- Team colours: Yellow and black
- General manager: Jamie Reddish
- Head coach: Dan Ryan
- Ownership: Jamie Reddish & Scott Kelso (co-founders)
- Championships: 0
- Website: bullsbasketball.nz
Home	Away

The Franklin Bulls are a New Zealand professional basketball team based in Pukekohe. The Bulls compete in the National Basketball League (NBL), playing their home games at the Franklin Pool and Leisure Centre, known as the Stockyard.

== Team history ==
=== Coming from Pukekohe ===
In July 2019, the Franklin Bulls were granted conditional entry into the National Basketball League for the 2021 season. This application was then expedited when they completed a set of requirements set down by the league. In November 2019, they were granted entry into the NBL for the 2020 season. The team was co-founded by Jamie Reddish and Scott Kelso.

Mascot design - Before the Bulls joined the NBL, they ran a competition among its members to select a name for the team. The winning vote was going to see them called the Franklin "Blitz" however, it was later decided to name their newly created mascot Blitz and name the team the Bulls. Following this a logo was designed and the Franklin Pool and Leisure centre gained its nickname "The Stockyard". Blitz also has notable features in his design that members are aware of. He can be seen and heard making a lot of noise at home games, dishing out cowbells to fans.

=== 2020 season ===
Due to the COVID-19 pandemic, the 2020 season was initially suspended indefinitely. The league returned in a reduced format based entirely in Auckland at The Trusts Arena; it also included the first and only player draft. The inaugural Bulls team was coached by Liam Simmons, featuring FIBA 3x3 Tall Black Dom Kelman-Poto, Isaac Davidson, former Tall Black Everard Bartlett and Sam Timmins (who was their first draft choice). The team finished fifth in the regular season with a 7–7 record and lost 99–90 in their elimination final against the Taranaki Mountainairs.

=== 2021 season ===
In 2021, the Bulls finished their first full season in the league in eighth place with a 5–13 record. The team was coached by Jamie Reddish featuring Tall Black Isaac Davidson along with Denhym Brooke, imports Zane Waterman and former NBA Draft pick Josh Selby from the US. The Bulls also signed Kyrin Galloway from the New Zealand Breakers when Waterman's season was ended with a broken wrist. Josh Selby parted ways with the team on June 1 after sustaining an injury and requesting a return to the US.

In 2021 the Bulls played host for the New Zealand Breakers while dealing with schedule clashes with their normal home venue. The Pukekohe based Bulls stepped up and the Breakers took on the Illawarra Hawks at the Stockyard on May 28. The Hawks however took the win 84-73.

=== 2022 season ===
For the 2022 season, Rookie Tall Blacks Jayden Bezzant and Anzaz Risseto joined the team with Isaac Davidson returning for a third season. They also announced the return of NBL legend Leon Henry and star signing of Tall Blacks guard Corey Webster alongside new coach Morgan Maskell. They played most of the season with an all New Zealand born team, until Giddy Potts joined them as their only import on the roster, mid season.

They finished the regular season in eighth place with a 7–11 record and failed to make the playoffs.

- Corey Webster picked up the award for Most Outstanding Kiwi Guard.

=== 2023 season and a trip to the final 6 ===
For 2023, the Bulls recruited the New Zealand Breakers assistant coach Daniel Sokolovsky to be their head coach and hired former 150 game veteran Tall Black Mika Vukona to be their GM.

The roster included imports Rickey McGill and Jamaal Brantley, along with Tall Blacks Jayden Bezzant, Dan Fotu, Tyrell Harrison, Isaac Davidson and Dom Kelman-Poto. Mid season additions included Matt Freeman and Jared Wilson-Frame as a free agent released from the Canturbury Rams. They finished the regular season in fourth place with a 12–6 record heading to their first play in series. They easily defeated the Wellington Saints 124–104 in the 1st play-in match, setting a semi-final against the Tuatara. However in the semi-final, the Bulls lost 92–67 to the Tuatara.

- Brantley and McGill were both nominated in the finalists group for the Defensive Player of the Year award.
- On June 11 Isaac Davidson became the first Bulls player to rack up 50 games played for the Club.

Due to scheduling issues, some home games were played at Bruce Pulman Arena, Takaanini.

=== 2024 season and Rapid League ===
FIBA German International team assistant coach Sebastian Gleim signed a two-year deal as the Bulls head coach. Dom Kelman-Poto (3rd season) and Issac Davidson (5th season) returned. They were joined alongside Tall Blacks Ethan Rusbatch, Jordan Hunt, former 2020 Bull Sam Timmins and Dru-Leo Leusogi-Ape. Guards Luther Muhammad, Joshua Scott and forward Jamaal Brantley (2nd season) joined as the team's imports. Season 2024 also seems the integration of the Rapid League, in which local players (no imports) whom are non-starters will take part in a shortened contest before the main game. Coaches Joe Reddish and Samara Funnell split their time coaching this team, during which Funnell made her coaching debut against the Sharks and picked up a win in her first match in the Rapid League as the nominated head coach for that game.

Shortly after Round 7 Jordan Hunt was ruled out for the remainder of season, due to an on-going ankle injury he sustained while playing in the UK. Post round 8 The Bulls were involved in a player trade with the Auckland Tuatara, which was an NBL first. On May 24 Brantley and the Bulls mutually parted ways. Following this KC Nwafor was re-signed on a short-term contract as cover. American guard Lee Skinner arrived from Cyprus in time for Round 10 action debuting in a win over the Sharks, to then take his place.

The Bulls reached the semi-final, where they lost 78–75 to the Auckland Tuatara.

=== All time statistical leaders NBL ===
Individual:

Individual Stat Leaders (Game)
Stat Type	Total	Player name
Points	42	Josh Selby (United States)
Rebounds	18	Leon Henry (New Zealand)
Steals	6	Rickey McGill (United States)
Blocks	6	Sam Timmins* (New Zealand) & Denhym Brooke (New Zealand)
Assists	13	Corey Webster (New Zealand)
Games played	56*	Isaac Davidson (New Zealand)

- At the end of the 2023 Season, Isaac Davidson led the team in 5 different categories for all time - Points, Rebounds, Assists, Steals and games played.

Team:

- Highest Score: 124-104 W vs. Wellington Saints in the NBL 2023 finals play in game, Trusts Arena, Auckland.
- Winning Margin: 34 Points (2x) vs. Otago Nuggets & Southland Sharks in 2024 NBL regular season, both at the 'Stockyard', Pukekohe.

=== All time statistical leaders Rapid League ===
- Points (Match):
- Rebounds (Match):
- Steals (Match):
- Blocks (Match):
- Assists (Match):
- Games Played (Total) 15* Halasiale Maile (New Zealand)

=== National honours and other team connections ===
National Teams
Player name	Country	Debut	Games Played
Jayden Bezzant	(New Zealand) Tall Blacks	2022	2
Jayden Bezzant	(New Zealand) NZ 3v3	2022	
Anzac Risseto	(New Zealand) Tall Blacks	2022	2
Dominique Kelman-Poto*	(New Zealand) NZ 3v3	2022	50
Isaac Davidson*	(New Zealand) Tall Blacks	2022	7
Kane Bennet-Keil	(New Zealand) Tall Blacks	2022	3
Brody Perry*	(New Zealand) U17	2022	

Australian NBL (Australia)
Player name	Team	Debut	Games Played
Issac Davidson*	NZ Breakers	2021	16
Dominique Kelman-Poto*	NZ Breakers	2023	1
Jayden Bezzant	NZ Breakers	2022	1
Anzac Rissetto	SE Melbourne Phoenix	2022	23

Portugal - Liga Portuguesa de Basquetebol
Player name	Team	Debut	Games Played
Zane Waterman	U.D Oliveirense	2021	25

Finland - Korisliiga
Player name	Team	Debut	Games Played
Isaac Davidson*	Bisons Loimaa	2023	31

United Kingdom - British Basketball League
Player name	Team	Debut	Games Played
Rickey McGill	Newcastle Eagles	2023	36

(*) denotes active player still on Bulls roster

== Season by season record ==
Note: GP = Games played, W = Wins, L = Losses, W–L% = Winning percentage

Season	GP	W	L	W–L%	Finish	Finals
2020	14	7	7	.500	5th	Lost Elimination Final, 90–99 (Taranaki Mountainairs)
2021	18	5	13	.278	8th	Did not qualify
2022	18	7	11	.389	8th	Did not qualify
2023	18	12	6	.667	4th	Won Preliminary Final, 124–104 (Wellington Saints); Lost Semi-final, 67–92 (Auckland Tuatara)
2024	20	13	7	.650	5th	Won Preliminary Final, 104–67 (Wellington Saints), Lost Semi-final, 78–75 (Auckland Tuatara)
2025	20	9	11	.450	7th	Did not qualify

(*) Denotes season still in progress

== Current roster ==
Note: Flags indicate national team eligibility at FIBA-sanctioned events. Players may hold other non-FIBA nationalities not displayed.

Franklin Bulls roster
Players
Coaches

Pos.	No.	Nat.	Name	Ht.
G	0	(United States)	Carter, Jace (I & C)	1.98 m (6 ft 6 in)
F/C	1	(New Zealand)	Biggar, Ellis	2.08 m (6 ft 10 in)
G	2	(New Zealand)	Perry, Corey	1.85 m (6 ft 1 in)
G/F	3	(New Zealand)	Callinan-Williams, Noah	1.90 m (6 ft 3 in)
G	4	(United States)	Boyd, Derrin (I)	1.90 m (6 ft 3 in)
G	5	(New Zealand)	Anderson, Zion	1.93 m (6 ft 4 in)
G	6	(New Zealand)	Gerrand, Jaylen (IN)	1.83 m (6 ft 0 in)
F	7	(New Zealand)	Otunuku, Zeek	1.94 m (6 ft 4 in)
G	8	(New Zealand)	Kelso, Harrison	1.93 m (6 ft 4 in)
F	9	(New Zealand)	Freeman, Matt	2.07 m (6 ft 9 in)
G	10	(New Zealand)	Savill, Hunter	1.85 m (6 ft 1 in)
G	11	(United States)	Whitt, Carter (I)	1.90 m (6 ft 3 in)
G	15	(New Zealand)	Marsh, Arahi	1.80 m (5 ft 11 in)
G	16	(New Zealand)	Hughes, Payton	1.80 m (5 ft 11 in)
F	23	(Nigeria)	Nwafor, Kenechukwu	2.02 m (6 ft 8 in)
F	24	(New Zealand)	Robinson, Kael	2.01 m (6 ft 7 in)
F	25	(New Zealand)	Kelman-Poto, Dominique	2.01 m (6 ft 7 in)
G	28	(New Zealand)	Pakaurangi, Taiapua	1.85 m (6 ft 1 in)
G/F	38	(New Zealand)	Perry, Brody	1.90 m (6 ft 3 in)

Head coach

- (United States) Dan Ryan

Assistant coach(es)

- (New Zealand) John Auld
- (New Zealand) Jeff Green
- (New Zealand) Jamie Reddish

Legend

- (C) Team captain
- (DP) Development player
- (I) Import player
- Injured

- Roster
Updated: 10 May 2026

=== Previous Rosters ===
2020

Franklin Bulls roster
Players
Coaches

Pos.	No.	Nat.	Name	Ht.
G	0	(New Zealand)	Stubbins, Jackson	1.88 m (6 ft 2 in)
C	4	(New Zealand)	Timmins, Samuel	2.11 m (6 ft 11 in)
PF	7	(New Zealand)	Dunstan, Adam	2.03 m (6 ft 8 in)
G	9	(New Zealand)	Reddish, Joseph	1.84 m (6 ft 0 in)
G	10	(New Zealand)	McIntosh, Chris	1.83 m (6 ft 0 in)
G/F	12	(New Zealand)	Davidson, Isaac	2.01 m (6 ft 7 in)
F	14	(New Zealand)	Barrow, Nick	2.03 m (6 ft 8 in)
G/F	21	(New Zealand)	Bartlett, Everard	1.93 m (6 ft 4 in)
G	22	(New Zealand)	Woodbridge, Connor	1.85 m (6 ft 1 in)
F	25	(New Zealand)	Kelman-Poto, Dom	2.01 m (6 ft 7 in)
G	31	(Samoa)	Leusogi-Ape, Dru-Leo	1.88 m (6 ft 2 in)
G	35	(New Zealand)	McCullough, Nikau	1.88 m (6 ft 2 in)
F	43	(New Zealand)	Vaiangina, Joel	2.02 m (6 ft 8 in)

Head coach

- (Australia) Liam Simmons

Assistant coach(es)

- (New Zealand) Tony Webster

Legend

- (C) Team captain
- (DP) Development player
- (I) Import player
- Injured

- Roster
Updated: 7 January 2025

2021

Franklin Bulls roster
Players
Coaches

Pos.	No.	Nat.	Name	Ht.
G	2	(New Zealand)	Thompson, Jett	1.88 m (6 ft 2 in)
G	3	(New Zealand)	Fee, Nick	1.85 m (6 ft 1 in)
G	4	(New Zealand)	Nunag, Joseph	1.83 m (6 ft 0 in)
G	6	(New Zealand)	Wilkie, Dylan	1.91 m (6 ft 3 in)
F	7	(New Zealand)	Iuli, Braydon	1.91 m (6 ft 3 in)
F	10	(New Zealand)	Brooke, Denhym	2.03 m (6 ft 8 in)
G/F	12	(New Zealand)	Davidson, Isaac	2.01 m (6 ft 7 in)
F	30	(Australia)	Ayol, Manel	2.01 m (6 ft 7 in)
F	31	(Australia)	Galloway, Kyrin	2.03 m (6 ft 8 in)
G	34	(New Zealand)	Gerrand, Jaylen	1.83 m (6 ft 0 in)
F	41	(New Zealand)	Dunstan, Adam	2.03 m (6 ft 8 in)
G	44	(New Zealand)	McLennan, Tyrone	1.88 m (6 ft 2 in)

Head coach

- (New Zealand) Jamie Reddish

Assistant coach(es)

Legend

- (C) Team captain
- (DP) Development player
- (I) Import player
- Injured

2022

Franklin Bulls roster
Players
Coaches

Pos.	No.	Nat.	Name	Ht.
C	1	(New Zealand)	Rissetto, Anzac	2.08 m (6 ft 10 in)
G	4	(New Zealand)	Thompson, Jett	1.88 m (6 ft 2 in)
F	5	(New Zealand)	Leger, Joshua	2.03 m (6 ft 8 in)
F	7	(New Zealand)	Bennet-Keil, Kane	1.98 m (6 ft 6 in)
F	8	(New Zealand)	McKenzie, Zach	2.02 m (6 ft 8 in)
G	9	(New Zealand)	Webster, Corey	1.85 m (6 ft 1 in)
F	10	(New Zealand)	Brooke, Denhym	2.03 m (6 ft 8 in)
G/F	12	(New Zealand)	Davidson, Isaac	2.01 m (6 ft 7 in)
F	15	(New Zealand)	Henry, Leon	2.00 m (6 ft 7 in)
G	20	(United States)	Potts, Giddy	1.88 m (6 ft 2 in)
F	23	(New Zealand)	Robinson, Kael	1.98 m (6 ft 6 in)
G	28	(New Zealand)	Bezzant, Jayden	1.85 m (6 ft 1 in)

Head coach

- (New Zealand) Morgan Maskell

Assistant coach(es)

- (New Zealand) Joseph Reddish

Legend

- (C) Team captain
- (DP) Development player
- (I) Import player
- Injured

2023

Franklin Bulls roster
Players
Coaches

Pos.	No.	Nat.	Name	Ht.
G	0	(New Zealand)	Anderson, John	1.88 m (6 ft 2 in)
G	2	(United States)	McGill, Rickey	1.88 m (6 ft 2 in)
G/F	4	(United States)	Wilson-Frame, Jared	1.96 m (6 ft 5 in)
G	5	(New Zealand)	Vano, Christian	1.78 m (5 ft 10 in)
F	7	(United States)	Brantley, Jamaal	1.98 m (6 ft 6 in)
F	8	(New Zealand)	McKenzie, Zach	2.02 m (6 ft 8 in)
F	9	(New Zealand)	Freeman, Matt	2.07 m (6 ft 9 in)
G/F	12	(New Zealand)	Davidson, Isaac	2.01 m (6 ft 7 in)
F	13	(New Zealand)	Lewis, Te Tuhi	1.95 m (6 ft 5 in)
C	24	(New Zealand)	Harrison, Tyrell	2.14 m (7 ft 0 in)
F	25	(New Zealand)	Kelman-Poto, Dom	1.96 m (6 ft 5 in)
G	28	(New Zealand)	Bezzant, Jayden	1.85 m (6 ft 1 in)
F	42	(New Zealand)	Fotu, Daniel	2.03 m (6 ft 8 in)

Head coach

- (New Zealand) Daniel Sokolovsky

Assistant coach(es)

- (New Zealand) Joseph Reddish
- (New Zealand) Samara Funnell

Legend

- (C) Team captain
- (DP) Development player
- (I) Import player
- Injured

2024

Franklin Bulls roster
Players
Coaches

Pos.	No.	Nat.	Name	Ht.
G	2	(New Zealand)	Rusbatch, Ethan	1.96 m (6 ft 5 in)
G	4	(New Zealand)	Vano, Christian	1.78 m (5 ft 10 in)
F	7	(New Zealand)	Coker-Grey, Harry	1.94 m (6 ft 4 in)
F	9	(New Zealand)	Maile, Halasiale	1.89 m (6 ft 2 in)
F	8	(United States)	Muhammad, Luther	2.07 m (6 ft 9 in)
G	11	(United States)	Scott, Josh	1.85 m (6 ft 1 in)
F	12	(New Zealand)	Davidson, Isaac	2.01 m (6 ft 7 in)
G	13	(Samoa)	Leusogi-Ape, Dru-Leo	1.90 m (6 ft 3 in)
F	14	(New Zealand)	Davis, Liam	1.93 m (6 ft 4 in)
G	24	(New Zealand)	Hughes, Payton	1.80 m (5 ft 11 in)
F	25	(New Zealand)	Kelman-Poto, Dom	2.01 m (6 ft 7 in)
F	34	(United States)	Skinner, Lee	1.98 m (6 ft 6 in)
G/F	38	(New Zealand)	Perry, Brody	1.90 m (6 ft 3 in)
G	38	(New Zealand)	Perry, Corey	1.85 m (6 ft 1 in)
G	53	(New Zealand)	Short, Nathaniel	1.90 m (6 ft 3 in)

Head coach

- (New Zealand) Sebastian Gleim

Assistant coach(es)

- (New Zealand) Joseph Reddish
- (New Zealand) Samara Funnell

Legend

- (C) Team captain
- (DP) Development player
- (I) Import player
- Injured

2025

Franklin Bulls roster
Players
Coaches

Pos.	No.	Nat.	Name	Ht.
G	1	(United States)	Hardy, Tae (injured) (I)	1.90 m (6 ft 3 in)
G	2	(New Zealand)	Perry, Corey	1.85 m (6 ft 1 in)
F	3	(New Zealand)	Jones, Marcel	2.03 m (6 ft 8 in)
G	4	(New Zealand)	Vano, Christian	1.90 m (6 ft 3 in)
G	5	(New Zealand)	Coker-Grey, Harri	1.94 m (6 ft 4 in)
G	6	(New Zealand)	Savill, Hunter (DP)	1.85 m (6 ft 1 in)
F	9	(New Zealand)	Maile, Halasiale	1.89 m (6 ft 2 in)
F	10	(Australia)	Okwera, David (I)	2.08 m (6 ft 10 in)
G	11	(New Zealand)	Cameron, Tobias	1.96 m (6 ft 5 in)
G/F	12	(New Zealand)	Rusbatch, Ethan (C)	1.96 m (6 ft 5 in)
F	15	(New Zealand)	Hunt, Jordan	2.06 m (6 ft 9 in)
C	18	(Germany)	Gloger, Till (I)	2.04 m (6 ft 8 in)
G	21	(New Zealand)	Cameron, Flynn	1.96 m (6 ft 5 in)
F	23	(Nigeria)	Nwafor, Kenechukwu	2.02 m (6 ft 8 in)
G	24	(New Zealand)	Hughes, Payton	1.80 m (5 ft 11 in)
G	25	(New Zealand)	Anderson, Zion	1.93 m (6 ft 4 in)
G		(New Zealand)	Kelso, Harrison	1.93 m (6 ft 4 in)
F		(New Zealand)	Macfarlane, Jaxson	1.96 m (6 ft 5 in)
F		(New Zealand)	Otunuku, Ezekiel (DP)	1.96 m (6 ft 5 in)
G		(New Zealand)	Williams, Noah	1.91 m (6 ft 3 in)

Head coach

- (Germany) Sebastian Gleim

Assistant coach(es)

- (New Zealand) Joe Reddish
- (New Zealand) Samara Funnell

Legend

- (C) Team captain
- (DP) Development player
- (I) Import player
- Injured

- Roster
Updated: 7 January 2025
