= 2019–20 BYU Cougars men's basketball team =

American college basketball season

2019–20 BYU Cougars men's basketball
- Conference: West Coast Conference

Ranking
- Coaches: No. 16
- AP: No. 18
- Record: 24–8 (13–3 WCC)
- Head coach: Mark Pope (1st season)
- Assistant coaches: Chris Burgess (1st season); Cody Fueger (1st season); Nick Robinson (1st season)
- Home arena: Marriott Center (Capacity: 18,987)

2019–20 West Coast Conference men's basketball standings
	Conf.				Overall
Team	W		L	PCT	W		L	PCT
No. 2 Gonzaga †	15	–	1	.938	31	–	2	.939
No. 14 BYU	13	–	3	.813	24	–	8	.750
Saint Mary's	11	–	5	.688	26	–	8	.765
Pacific	11	–	5	.688	23	–	10	.697
San Francisco	9	–	7	.563	22	–	12	.647
Pepperdine	8	–	8	.500	16	–	16	.500
Santa Clara	6	–	10	.375	20	–	13	.606
Loyola Marymount	4	–	12	.250	11	–	21	.344
San Diego	2	–	14	.125	9	–	23	.281
Portland	1	–	15	.063	9	–	23	.281
† 2020 WCC tournament winner Rankings from AP poll

The 2019–20 BYU Cougars men's basketball team represented Brigham Young University in the 2019–20 NCAA Division I men's basketball season. It was head coach Mark Pope's first season as BYU's head coach and the Cougars ninth season as members of the West Coast Conference (WCC). The Cougars played their home games at the Marriott Center in Provo, Utah. They finished the season 24–8, 13–3 in WCC play to finish in second place. They lost in the semifinals of the WCC tournament to Saint Mary's. Despite being a virtual lock to receive an at-large bid to the NCAA tournament, all postseason play was cancelled amid the COVID-19 pandemic.

== Previous season ==
The Cougars finished the 2018–19 season 19–13, 11–5 in West Coast Conference play to finish tied for second place with Saint Mary's. As the No. 3 seed in the WCC Tournament, they lost to San Diego in the quarterfinals. They were not invited to play in the NCAA or NIT tournament and declined to participate in any other postseason tournament. Shortly after the season ended, longtime head coach Dave Rose announced his retirement. Utah Valley head coach Mark Pope, who previously spent four seasons as an assistant at BYU under Rose, was hired in April to be his replacement. Later in April, Pope announced that he had selected Chris Burgess and Cody Fueger from Utah Valley and Nick Robinson from Southern Utah as his assistant coaches. Average home game attendance for the 16 games played at the Marriott Center for the 2018–19 season was 11,958. This was the second highest attendance in the West behind Arizona and ranked 27th nationwide.

== Offseason ==
=== Departures ===
During the 2018–19 season, BYU had two seniors that finished their eligibility to play college basketball - McKay Cannon and Luke Worthington. Two years passed since BYU had seniors as part of a basketball team. McKay Cannon transferred to BYU from Weber State University. Despite being a walk-on, Cannon started 18 games during his time at BYU. Luke Worthington played in 130 games (starting 62) and was the only player on the roster with NCAA tournament experience. Worthington will continue with the BYU basketball team as a graduate assistant alongside former teammate Nate Austin.

Nick Emery announced his retirement from college basketball via social media in July 2019 saying, "My time here has been rocky at times, but the good times definitely outweighed the bad...I am at a point in life where I am happy with what I've accomplished with basketball and I'm ready to start the next chapter of my life with my wife and son." Emery left BYU with one year of eligibility remaining.

In May 2019, Jahshire Hardnett committed to the University of Montana as a graduate transfer. However, due to graduate school admission timing issues, he reopened his recruitment in July 2019. A month later in August, Hardnett decided to transfer to the University of Missouri-Kansas City and will be eligible to play immediately. Rylan Bergersen transferred to the University of Central Arkansas, a Division I program, with two years of eligibility remaining. Bergersen was granted a waiver and was eligible to play immediately. Colby Leifson entered the transfer portal in October 2019, and as of the start of the season, no information was available regarding where he would transfer. On February 5, 2020, Utah Valley University announced Leifson would transfer to UVU with 3 seasons of eligibility remaining.

Name	Number	Position	Height	Weight	Year	Hometown	Reason for Departure
McKay Cannon	24	Guard	6'0"	185	Senior	Shelley, Idaho	Graduated
Luke Worthington	41	Forward	6'10	235	Senior	Mequon, Wisconsin	Graduated
Nick Emery	4	Guard	6'2"	185	Junior	Alpine, Utah	Retired
Jahshire Hardnett	0	Guard	6'0"	185	Junior	Gulfport, Mississippi	Graduate transferred to University of Missouri-Kansas City
Rylan Bergersen	1	Guard	6'6"	200	Sophomore	Boise, Idaho	Transferred to University of Central Arkansas
Colby Leifson	0	Guard	6'4"	190	Sophomore	Suwanee, Georgia	Transferred to Utah Valley University

=== Incoming transfers ===
With Mark Pope coming as the new head coach to BYU from Utah Valley University (UVU), three players from the UVU basketball team decided to follow Pope and transfer to BYU. First, on April 23, it was announced that Jake Toolson, the 2018-19 Western Athletic Conference (WAC) Player of the Year who had previously played for BYU for two seasons, would transfer back to BYU. During Toolson's second season at BYU, he applied for a medical leave of absence in December 2015. Therefore, while Toolson played two additional seasons at UVU, he still had one year of eligibility remaining, and as a graduate transfer, was eligible to play immediately during the 2019–20 season. Before Toolson recommitted to BYU, he was recruited by several schools including Duke, Virginia, Arizona State and Utah State. Jeff Goodman of WatchStadium.com ranked Toolson as one of the top 10 graduate transfers during the offseason. Then on April 24, Wyatt Lowell, a consensus 3-star prospect, announced he would transfer from UVU. Lowell, who was the 2018-19 WAC Newcomer of the Year, will sit out the 2019–20 season and will have three years of eligibility remaining. The next month, on May 8, Richard Harward also announced he would be transferring from UVU to BYU with two years of eligibility remaining. As of the start of the season, it had not yet been determined whether Harward would be eligible to play during the 2019–20 season. However, in December, Mark Pope indicated that Harward did not receive a waiver and would not be eligible to play during the 2019–20 season.

On May 6, Blaze Nield announced via social media that he would transfer from Utah State Eastern with three years of eligibility remaining. While he had scholarship offers from Montana State University, Idaho State University and the University of Maryland, Baltimore County, Nield will join BYU as a walk-on. Later in the summer, on July 31, it was reported that Alex Barcello, a consensus 4-star recruit, would transfer from the University of Arizona. He was granted a waiver and was eligible to play immediately.

Name	Position	Height	Weight	Year	Hometown	Previous School	Years Remaining	Date Eligible	Walk On/ Scholarship	Rivals	247Sports	ESPN	ESPN Grade
Alex Barcello	Guard	6'2"	180	Junior	Chandler, Arizona	University of Arizona	2	November 2019	Scholarship	4-star	4-star	4-star	83
Richard Harward	Center	6'11"	255	Junior	Orem, Utah	Utah Valley University	2	November 2020	Scholarship	N/A	N/A	2-star	62
Wyatt Lowell	Forward	6'10"	205	Sophomore	Gilbert, Arizona	Utah Valley University	3	November 2020	Scholarship	3-star	3-star	3-star	73
Blaze Nield	Guard	6'1"	185	Sophomore	Lehi, Utah	Utah State University Eastern	3	November 2019	Walk On	N/A	N/A	N/A	N/A
Jake Toolson	Guard	6'5"	205	Senior	Gilbert, Arizona	Utah Valley University	1	November 2019	Scholarship	3-star	3-star	2-star	67

=== Returned Missionaries ===
Two players were added to the roster during the offseason who recently returned from missionary service. Trevin Knell originally had committed to University of California, Berkeley. However, due to a coaching change at Cal, he decided to play for BYU in May 2017 before leaving on his mission in July. Knell is a consensus 3-star prospect who was part of the 2017 recruiting class. Cameron Pearson joins the team as a walk-on after serving a mission in Chile and utilizing a redshirt year. Pearson was part of the 2016 recruiting class after playing at Chatfield High School in Lakewood, Colorado.

Name	Position	Height	Weight	Year	Hometown	High School	Mission Location	Years Remaining	Recruiting Class	Rivals	247Sports	ESPN	ESPN Grade
Trevin Knell	Guard	6'5"	190	Freshman	Bountiful, Utah	Woods Cross High School	Uruguay, Montevideo	4	2017	3-star	3-star	3-star	77
Cameron Pearson	Guard	6'0"	175	Freshman	Lakewood, Colorado	Chatfield High School	Chile, Antofagasta	4	2016	N/A	N/A	N/A	N/A

=== 2019 Recruiting Class ===
College recruiting
Name	Hometown	School	Height	Weight	Commit date
Casey Brown; Guard	Pleasant Grove, Utah	Pleasant Grove High School	6 ft 3 in (1.91 m)	175 lb (79 kg)	Aug 27, 2018
Casey Brown; Guard	Recruit ratings: ESPN: (N/A)				
Nate Hansen; Guard	Provo, Utah	Timpview High School	6 ft 3 in (1.91 m)	165 lb (75 kg)	Nov 14, 2018
Nate Hansen; Guard	Recruit ratings: Rivals: 247Sports: ESPN: (N/A)				
Trey Stewart; Guard	American Fork, Utah	American Fork High School	6 ft 3 in (1.91 m)	195 lb (88 kg)	Apr 25, 2019
Trey Stewart; Guard	Recruit ratings: ESPN: (80)				
Jeremy DowDell; Guard	Salt Lake City, Utah	Olympus High School	6 ft 3 in (1.91 m)	180 lb (82 kg)	Jun 11, 2019
Jeremy DowDell; Guard	Recruit ratings: ESPN: (N/A)				
Overall recruit ranking: Scout: nr Rivals: nr 247Sports: 115
Note: In many cases, Scout, Rivals, 247Sports, On3, and ESPN may conflict in their listings of height and weight.; In these cases, the average was taken. ESPN grades are on a 100-point scale.; Sources: "BYU 2019 Basketball Commitments". Rivals.; "ESPN". ESPN.; "2019 Team Ranking". Rivals.com.; "2019 BYU Basketball Commits". 247Sports.

=== 2020 Recruiting Class ===
Six high school players committed to play for BYU from the 2020 recruiting class. Richie Saunders, Dallin Hall, Tanner Hayhurst and Tanner Toolson each plan to complete two-year full-time missionary service before joining the team for the 2022–23 season. Only Townsend Tripple and Caleb Lohner will join the roster for the 2020–21 season. Tripple had originally planned to complete missionary service before joining the team and was assigned to Argentina, but decided to delay his mission trip due to coronavirus and joined the roster as a walk-on. In early June, it was reported that Caleb Lohner, a four-star forward from Texas who had previously signed with Utah, requested a release from his National Letter of Intent to sign with BYU. Lohner was released, and on June 26 officially signed with the Cougars. Lohner will be a true freshman and is immediately eligible to play.

College recruiting
Name	Hometown	School	Height	Weight	Commit date
Richie Saunders; Guard	Mount Pleasant, Utah	Wasatch Academy	6 ft 5 in (1.96 m)	180 lb (82 kg)	Oct 30, 2019
Richie Saunders; Guard	Recruit ratings: Scout: Rivals: 247Sports: ESPN: (N/A)				
Dallin Hall; Guard	Ogden, Utah	Fremont High School	6 ft 3 in (1.91 m)	180 lb (82 kg)	Mar 13, 2020
Dallin Hall; Guard	Recruit ratings: Rivals: 247Sports: ESPN: (N/A)				
Townsend Tripple; Forward	Meridian, Idaho	Rocky Mountain High School	6 ft 8 in (2.03 m)	200 lb (91 kg)	Apr 13, 2020
Townsend Tripple; Forward	Recruit ratings: Scout: Rivals: 247Sports: ESPN: (N/A)				
Tanner Hayhurst; Guard	Eagle, Idaho	Eagle High School	6 ft 6 in (1.98 m)	175 lb (79 kg)	May 7, 2020
Tanner Hayhurst; Guard	Recruit ratings: Scout: Rivals: 247Sports: ESPN: (N/A)				
Tanner Toolson; Guard	Vancouver, Washington	Union High School	6 ft 5 in (1.96 m)	185 lb (84 kg)	May 14, 2020
Tanner Toolson; Guard	Recruit ratings: ESPN: (N/A)				
Caleb Lohner; Forward	Flower Mound, Texas	Wasatch Academy	6 ft 7 in (2.01 m)	200 lb (91 kg)	Jun 26, 2020
Caleb Lohner; Forward	Recruit ratings: Rivals: 247Sports: ESPN: (81)				
Overall recruit ranking: Scout: nr Rivals: nr 247Sports: nr
Note: In many cases, Scout, Rivals, 247Sports, On3, and ESPN may conflict in their listings of height and weight.; In these cases, the average was taken. ESPN grades are on a 100-point scale.; Sources: "BYU 2020 Basketball Commitments". Rivals.; "ESPN". ESPN.; "2020 Team Ranking". Rivals.com.; "2020 BYU Basketball Commits". 247Sports.

=== Preseason Polls and Rankings ===
BYU was selected to finish third in the West Coast Conference in the Preseason Men's Basketball Coaches Poll behind Gonzaga and Saint Mary's. Yoeli Childs and TJ Haws were named to the 2019-2020 All-WCC Pre-season Men's Basketball Team. For the second straight year, Yoeli Childs was among 20 college basketball forwards named to the Karl Malone watch list. The Karl Malone Award selects the nation's top power forward in NCAA college basketball. In early November, before the season began, Yoeli was also named to the list of 50 players to watch for the 2020 Citizen Naismith Trophy Men's Player of the Year as well as the Preseason Top 50 Watch List for The John R. Wooden Award.

2019-20 WCC Preseason Men's Basketball Coaches Poll
Rank	Team (First Place Votes)	Points
1.	Gonzaga (7)	79
2.	Saint Mary's (3)	75
3.	BYU	65
4.	Pepperdine	56
5.	Santa Clara	50
6.	San Francisco	40
7.	Loyola Marymount	34
8.	Pacific	21
8.	San Diego	21
10.	Portland	9

Several media outlets ranked BYU among the top 100 Division I college basketball preseason teams for the 2019–20 season. The rankings ranged from as high as #41 from Team Rankings and ESPN's BPI ranking to as low as #75 by Sports Illustrated. Some rankings projected BYU as a possible NCAA Tournament team or as a possible NIT Tournament selection. Consistent with the WCC preseason coaches poll, each of the writers projected BYU 3rd among WCC teams. A summary of the various preseason rankings that included BYU is as follows:

Writer(s)	Organization/Metric	Date	BYU Overall Rank	BYU WCC Rank	Total # Teams Ranked	Notes/References
Seth Walder & Paul Sabin	ESPN BPI	November 1, 2019	#41	#3	100	47% Probability of NCAA Tournament Appearance
David Hess	Team Rankings	November 1, 2019	#41	#3	353	
Jay Bilas	ESPN	November 5, 2019	#61	#3	68	
Matt Norlander	CBS Sports	October 22, 2019	#66	#3	353	
Joel Welser	College Sports Madness	September 1, 2019	#66	#3	144	Projected NIT Tournament
Molly Geary & Joe Wilkinson	Sports Illustrated	November 1, 2019	#75	#3	353	

=== Preseason Injuries and Suspensions ===
Several players were injured or were subject to suspensions during the offseason that will affect their ability to play during the regular season. Yoeli Childs was suspended by the NCAA for paperwork errors in the NBA draft exploration process that will cause him to miss the first nine games of the regular season. In August, Zac Seljaas broke his foot during a game in Italy and was estimated to be out until November or December 2019. His recovery progressed rapidly and he was cleared to play by the opening game of the season. Gavin Baxter injured his shoulder in a practice during September which will likely result in his missing the entire 2019–20 season. It was revealed in November that Jesse Wade has for some time had a knee injury which is likely to prevent him from playing for a long-term period.

=== Italy Trip and Scrimmages ===
During August, BYU played four games as part of a trip to Italy. BYU won all four games during the 10-day tour of Italy. Every four years, the NCAA permits college basketball teams to take a trip to a foreign country.

Date	Opponent	Result	Points	Rebounds	Assists
August 19, 2019	BC Silute	W 92-64	TJ Haws 23	Jake Toolson 10	TJ Haws 10
August 20, 2019	LCC International	W 87-46	Alex Barcello 15	Yoeli Childs 11	Yoeli Childs 7
August 22, 2019	Stella Azzurra	W 71-62	Yoeli Childs 21	Yoeli Childs 7	Jake Toolson 5
August 23, 2019	LCC International	W 81-55	Kolby Lee 16	Kolby Lee 10	Blaze Nield 10

On October 26, just before the regular season began, the team also played a scrimmage against the University of California, Berkeley. While the results and statistics of the scrimmage were not released to the public, Mark Pope indicated that the team played quite well.

== Roster ==
2019–20 BYU Cougars men's basketball team
Players
Coaches

Pos.	#	Name	Height	Weight	Year	Previous school	Hometown
F	1	Wyatt Lowell (redshirt)	6 ft 10 in (2.08 m)	205 lb (93 kg)	So	Utah Valley	Gilbert, AZ
G	2	Zac Seljaas	6 ft 7 in (2.01 m)	215 lb (98 kg)	Sr	Bountiful	Bountiful, UT
G	3	Blaze Nield (W)	6 ft 1 in (1.85 m)	185 lb (84 kg)	So	Utah State Eastern	Lehi, Utah
G	4	Alex Barcello	6 ft 2 in (1.88 m)	180 lb (82 kg)	Jr	Arizona	Chandler, AZ
G	5	Jake Toolson	6 ft 5 in (1.96 m)	205 lb (93 kg)	RS Sr	Utah Valley	Gilbert, AZ
G	10	Jesse Wade (injured)	6 ft 1 in (1.85 m)	175 lb (79 kg)	RS So	Davis; Gonzaga	Kaysville, UT
G	13	Taylor Maughan (W)	6 ft 4 in (1.93 m)	200 lb (91 kg)	Sr	Troy; BYU-Hawaii	Fullerton, CA
G	15	Cameron Pearson (W)	6 ft 0 in (1.83 m)	175 lb (79 kg)	RS Fr	Chatfield	Lakewood, CO
G	21	Trevin Knell	6 ft 5 in (1.96 m)	190 lb (86 kg)	Fr	Woods Cross	Woods Cross, UT
F	23	Yoeli Childs	6 ft 8 in (2.03 m)	225 lb (102 kg)	Sr	Bingham	South Jordan, UT
G	24	Evan Troy (W)	6 ft 5 in (1.96 m)	180 lb (82 kg)	Sr	Mark Morris	Longview, WA
F	25	Gavin Baxter	6 ft 9 in (2.06 m)	210 lb (95 kg)	So	Timpview	Provo, UT
G	30	T. J. Haws	6 ft 4 in (1.93 m)	170 lb (77 kg)	Sr	Lone Peak	Alpine, UT
F	33	Dalton Nixon	6 ft 7 in (2.01 m)	215 lb (98 kg)	RS Sr	Orem	Orem, UT
F	40	Kolby Lee	6 ft 9 in (2.06 m)	260 lb (118 kg)	RS So	Rocky Mountain	Meridian, ID
C	42	Richard Harward (redshirt)	6 ft 11 in (2.11 m)	255 lb (116 kg)	Jr	Utah Valley	Orem, UT
G	44	Connor Harding	6 ft 6 in (1.98 m)	185 lb (84 kg)	So	Highland	Pocatello, ID

Head coach

- Mark Pope (Kentucky)

Assistant coach(es)

- Chris Burgess (Utah)
- Cody Fueger (Utah)
- Nick Robinson (Stanford)

Legend

- (C) Team captain
- (S) Suspended
- (I) Ineligible
- (W) Walk-on
- Injured
- Current redshirt

Roster

Source: BYU Basketball 2019-20 Roster (https://byucougars.com/roster/m-basketball/)

== Media Coverage ==
=== Radio ===
Greg Wrubell and Mark Durrant return to call men's basketball for the 2019–20 season. Jason Shepherd will fill-in for Greg at Houston and vs. Montana Tech (football/women's soccer conflicts), and Terry Nashif will fill-in for Mark Durrant on select road games.

Affiliates:

- BYU Radio- Flagship Station Nationwide (Dish Network 980, Sirius XM 143, KBYU 89.1 FM HD 2, TuneIn radio, and byuradio.org)
- KSL 102.7 FM and 1160 AM- (Salt Lake City / Provo, Utah and ksl.com)
- KSNA 100.7 FM - Blackfoot / Idaho Falls / Pocatello / Rexburg, Idaho (games)
- KSPZ 105.1 FM and 980 AM- Blackfoot / Idaho Falls / Pocatello / Rexburg, Idaho (coaches' shows)
- KMXD 100.5 FM- Monroe / Manti, Utah
- KSVC 980 AM- Richfield / Manti, Utah
- KDXU 94.9 FM and 890 AM- St. George, Utah

=== Television ===
In September 2019, the West Coast Conference (WCC) agreed to a multi-year deal through the 2026–27 season with ESPN and the CBS Sports Network to broadcast numerous basketball games each year. Previously, the WCC had an agreement with ESPN, but the new agreement adds additional television coverage of basketball games through the CBS Sports Network. Games broadcast on the CBS Sports Network are carried on channel 158 on the Dish Network, channel 221 on DirecTV and channel 269 on Xfinity. Under the terms of the deal, ESPN will broadcast 17 games during the regular season and the CBS Sports Network will broadcast a minimum of 9 games. ESPN will continue to broadcast the quarterfinals, semifinals and the championship game of the WCC tournament. BYU maintains the rights to broadcast home games on BYUtv (11.1 in Salt Lake City, Utah, channel 374 on the Dish Network, and channel 4369/9403 on DirecTV). Meanwhile, Stadium broadcasts will be simulcast on KJZZ or KMYU because Utah doesn't have a Stadium TV affiliate.

== Schedule and results ==
Date time, TV	Rank^{#}	Opponent^{#}	Result	Record	Site (attendance) city, state
Exhibition
November 1, 2019*; 7:00 pm, BYUtv		UT Tyler	W 100–58	–	Marriott Center (10,340); Provo, UT
Non-conference regular season
November 5, 2019*; 7:00 pm, BYUtv		Cal State Fullerton	W 76–58	1–0	Marriott Center (11,113); Provo, UT
November 9, 2019*; 2:00 pm, BYUtv		San Diego State	L 71–76	1–1	Marriott Center (12,567); Provo, UT
November 13, 2019*; 7:00 pm, BYUtv		Southern Utah; Maui Invitational	W 68–63	2–1	Marriott Center (10,661); Provo, UT
November 15, 2019*; 7:00 pm, ESPNU		at Houston	W 72–71	3–1	Fertitta Center (7,035); Houston, TX
November 20, 2019*; 8:00 pm, CBSSN		at Boise State	L 68–72 ^{OT}	3–2	ExtraMile Arena (6,143); Boise, ID
November 25, 2019*; 9:30 pm, ESPN2		vs. UCLA; Maui Invitational quarterfinals	W 78–63	4–2	Lahaina Civic Center (2,400); Lahaina, HI
November 26, 2019*; 8:30 pm, ESPN		vs. No. 4 Kansas; Maui Invitational semifinals	L 56–71	4–3	Lahaina Civic Center (2,400); Lahaina, HI
November 27, 2019*; 9:30 pm, ESPN2		vs. Virginia Tech; Maui Invitational 3rd place game	W 90–77	5–3	Lahaina Civic Center (2,400); Lahaina, HI
November 30, 2019*; 7:00 pm, BYUtv		Montana Tech	W 98–63	6–3	Marriott Center (10,990); Provo, UT
December 4, 2019*; 6:00 pm, P12N		at Utah; Deseret First Duel/Old Oquirrh Bucket	L 95–102 ^{OT}	6–4	Huntsman Center (11,565); Salt Lake City, UT
December 7, 2019*; 1:00 pm, BYUtv		vs. UNLV	W 83–50	7–4	Vivint Smart Home Arena (11,356); Salt Lake City, UT
December 10, 2019*; 7:00 pm, ESPNU		Nevada	W 75–42	8–4	Marriott Center (10,570); Provo, UT
December 14, 2019*; 5:00 pm, BYUtv		vs. Utah State; Beehive Classic/Old Oquirrh Classic	W 68–64	9–4	Vivint Smart Home Arena (10,291); Salt Lake City, UT
December 21, 2019*; 7:00 pm, BYUtv		Weber State; Old Oquirrh Classic	W 91–61	10–4	Marriott Center (11,662); Provo, UT
December 28, 2019*; 7:00 pm, BYUtv		Oral Roberts	W 79–73	11–4	Marriott Center (12,365); Provo, UT
WCC regular season
January 4, 2020; 7:00 pm, BYUtv		Loyola Marymount	W 63–38	12–4 (1–0)	Marriott Center (12,422); Provo, UT
January 9, 2020; 9:00 pm, ESPN2		at Saint Mary's	L 84–87 ^{OT}	12–5 (1–1)	University Credit Union Pavilion (3,500); Moraga, CA
January 11, 2020; 7:30 pm, BYUtv		Portland	W 96–70	13–5 (2–1)	Marriott Center (13,048); Provo, UT
January 16, 2020; 7:00 pm, BYUtv		San Diego	W 93–70	14–5 (3–1)	Marriott Center (11,339); Provo, UT
January 18, 2020; 9:00 pm, ESPN2		at No. 1 Gonzaga; Rivalry	L 69–92	14–6 (3–2)	McCarthey Athletic Center (6,000); Spokane, WA
January 23, 2020; 8:00 pm, Stadium		at Pacific	W 74–60	15–6 (4–2)	Alex G. Spanos Center (3,097); Stockton, CA
January 25, 2020; 3:00 pm, Stadium		at San Francisco	L 82–83	15–7 (4–3)	The Sobrato Center (3,006); San Francisco, CA
January 30, 2020; 6:30 pm, CBSSN		Pepperdine	W 107–80	16–7 (5–3)	Marriott Center (10,939); Provo, UT
February 1, 2020; 8:00 pm, ESPN2		Saint Mary's	W 81–79	17–7 (6–3)	Marriott Center (15,212); Provo, UT
February 6, 2020; 8:00 pm, Stadium		at Portland	W 85–54	18–7 (7–3)	Chiles Center (3,013); Portland, OR
February 8, 2020; 7:30 pm, BYUtv		San Francisco	W 90–76	19–7 (8–3)	Marriott Center (14,757); Provo, UT
February 13, 2020; 9:00 pm, ESPNU		at Loyola Marymount	W 77–54	20–7 (9–3)	Gersten Pavilion (1,533); Los Angeles, CA
February 15, 2020; 8:00 pm, CBSSN		at San Diego	W 72–71	21–7 (10–3)	Jenny Craig Pavilion (2,711); San Diego, CA
February 20, 2020; 7:00 pm, CBSSN	No. 23	Santa Clara	W 85–75	22–7 (11–3)	Marriott Center (12,757); Provo, UT
February 22, 2020; 8:00 pm, ESPN2	No. 23	No. 2 Gonzaga; Rivalry	W 91–78	23–7 (12–3)	Marriott Center (18,987); Provo, UT
February 29, 2020; 4:00 pm, CBSSN	No. 17	at Pepperdine	W 81–64	24–7 (13–3)	Firestone Fieldhouse (3,104); Malibu, CA
WCC tournament
March 9, 2020; 9:30 pm, ESPN2	(2) No. 14	vs. (3) Saint Mary's; Semifinals	L 50–51	24–8	Orleans Arena (7,471); Paradise, NV
*Non-conference game. ^{#}Rankings from AP Poll. (#) Tournament seedings in parentheses. All times are in Mountain.

== Game summaries ==
Series histories are adjusted for this season to exclude the 47 wins which the NCAA required BYU to forfeit from the 2015–16 and 2016–17 seasons following an improper benefits scandal involving former guard Nick Emery. The forfeits do not count as losses, but have been struck from the win totals.

=== Exhibition: UT Tyler ===
Broadcasters: Dave McCann & Blaine Fowler

Starting Lineups:

- UT Tyler: Ty Glover, Ty Bennett, Jerekius Davis, Chris Giles, Quinn Smith
- BYU: Alex Barcello, Jake Toolson, Dalton Nixon, Kolby Lee, Connor Harding

BYUtv

Nov 1
7:05 p.m. MDT

Recap

UT Tyler Patriots	58–100	BYU Cougars
Scoring by half: 19–40, 39–60
Pts: Da'Zhon Wyche 16; Rebs: Quinn Smith, Bryson Power 6 Asts: Ty Glover, Ty Bennett, Chris Giles, Ansu Sesay, Bryson Power 1		Pts: Trevin Knell 19; Rebs: Dalton Nixon 8 Asts: Blaze Nield 5

Marriott Center
Provo, UT
Attendance: 10,340
Referees: Tom Nally, Brady Chelette, Michael Rapp

=== Cal State Fullerton ===
Series History: Series even 3–3

Broadcasters: Dave McCann, Blaine Fowler & Spencer Linton
Starting Lineups:

- Cal State Fullerton: Daniel Venzant, Austen Awosika, Wayne Arnold, Davon Clare, Johnny Wang
- BYU: Alex Barcello, Jake Toolson, TJ Haws, Dalton Nixon, Kolby Lee

BYUtv

Nov 5
7:05 p.m. MST

Recap

Cal State Fullerton Titans	58–76	BYU Cougars
Scoring by half: 24–38, 34–38
Pts: Austen Awosika 16; Rebs: Austen Awosika, Wayne Arnold 6 Asts: Devon Clare, Daniel Venzant, Austen Awosika, Tory San Antonio 1		Pts: Alex Barcello, TJ Haws 17; Rebs: Zac Seljaas, Connor Harding 8 Asts: Jake Toolson 4

Marriott Center
Provo, UT
Attendance: 11,113
Referees: Tom Nally, Brady Chelette, Michael Rapp

=== San Diego State ===
Series History: BYU leads series 48–25

Broadcasters: Dave McCann, Blaine Fowler, & Spencer Linton
Starting Lineups:

- San Diego State: Yanni Wetzell, Nathan Mensah, KJ Feagin, Jordan Schakel, Malachi Flynn
- BYU: Alex Barcello, Jake Toolson, TJ Haws, Dalton Nixon, Kolby Lee

BYUtv

Nov 9
2:00 p.m. MST

Recap

San Diego State Aztecs	76–71	BYU Cougars
Scoring by half: 36–29, 40–42
Pts: Jordan Schakel 19; Rebs: Nathan Mensah 11; Asts: Malachi Flynn 5		Pts: Jake Toolson 18; Rebs: Dalton Nixon 5 Asts: TJ Haws 6

Marriott Center
Provo, UT
Attendance: 12,567
Referees: Randy McCall, Johns Higgins, Nate Harris

=== Southern Utah ===
Series History: BYU leads series 11–0

Broadcasters: Dave McCann, Blaine Fowler & Spencer Linton
Starting Lineups:

- Southern Utah: Jakolby Long, Dre Marin, Cameron Oluyitan, Dwayne Morgan, Andre Adams
- BYU: Alex Barcello, Jake Toolson, TJ Haws, Dalton Nixon, Kolby Lee

BYUtv

Nov 13
7:00 p.m. MST

Recap

Southern Utah Thunderbirds	63–68	BYU Cougars
Scoring by half: 31–36, 32–32
Pts: John Knight III 22; Rebs: Harrison Butler 9 Asts: Jakolby Long, Maizen Fausett 3		Pts: Jake Toolson 22; Rebs: Dalton Nixon 7 Asts: Dalton Nixon, Alex Barcello, Jake Toolson 3

Marriott Center
Provo, UT
Attendance: 10,661
Referees: Verne Harris, Mike Reed, Kelly Self

=== Houston ===
Series History: Houston leads series 5–2

Broadcasters: Ted Emrich & Tim Welsh
Starting Lineups:

- BYU: Alex Barcello, Jake Toolson, TJ Haws, Dalton Nixon, Kolby Lee
- Houston: Chris Harris Jr., DeJon Jarreau, Nate Hinton, Quentin Grimes, Fabian White Jr.

ESPNU

Nov 15
8:00 p.m. CST

Recap

BYU Cougars	72–71	Houston Cougars
Scoring by half: 35–28, 37–43
Pts: Alex Barcello 16; Rebs: Kolby Lee 7 Asts: TJ Haws 5		Pts: Caleb Mills 17; Rebs: Nate Hinton 7 Asts: Caleb Mills, DeJon Jarreau, Nate Hinton, Cedrick Alley Jr., Quentin Grimes 2

Fertitta Center
Houston, TX
Attendance: 7,035
Referees: Chuck Jones, Randy Heimerman, Gerald Williams

=== Boise State ===
Series History: BYU leads series 9–4

Broadcasters: Rich Waltz & Dan Dickau
Starting Lineups:

- BYU: Alex Barcello, Jake Toolson, TJ Haws, Dalton Nixon, Kolby Lee
- Boise State: RJ Williams, Marcus Dickinson, Justinian Jessup, Derrick Alston, Alex Hobbs

CBSSN

Nov 20
8:00 p.m. MST

Recap

BYU Cougars	68–72 (OT)	Boise State Broncos
Scoring by half: 20-27, 38-31 Overtime: 10-14
Pts: Jake Toolson 19; Rebs: Kolby Lee, Alex Barcello 7 Asts: Jake Toolson 4		Pts: Derrick Alston 26; Rebs: Derrick Alston 11; Asts: Justinian Jessup 3

ExtraMile Arena
Boise, ID
Attendance: 6,143
Referees: Larry Spaulding, Michael Greenstein, Kelly Pfeifer

=== UCLA ===
Series History: UCLA leads series 12–11

Broadcasters: Dave Pasch & Bill Walton
Starting Lineups:

- BYU: Alex Barcello, Jake Toolson, TJ Haws, Dalton Nixon, Kolby Lee
- UCLA: Cody Riley, Chris Smith, Tyger Campbell, Prince Ali, Jalen Hill

ESPN2

Nov 25
6:30 p.m. HAST

Recap

BYU Cougars	78–63	UCLA Bruins
Scoring by half: 36–32, 42–31
Pts: Jake Toolson 20; Rebs: Zac Seljaas 11; Asts: Alex Barcello 5		Pts: Jules Bernard 16; Rebs: Cody Riley 6 Asts: Chris Smith 6

Lahaina Civic Center
Lahaina, HI
Attendance: 2,400
Referees: Vern Harris, Les Jones, Ray Perone

=== Kansas ===
Series History: Kansas leads series 3–1

Broadcasters: Dan Shulman & Jay Bilas (ESPN)
Marc Kestecher & Malcolm Huckaby (ESPN Radio)
Starting Lineups:

- Kansas: Marcus Garrett, Devon Dotson, Ochai Agbaji, David McCormack, Udoka Azubuike
- BYU: Alex Barcello, Jake Toolson, TJ Haws, Dalton Nixon, Kolby Lee

ESPN

Nov 26
5:30 p.m. HAST

Recap

#4 Kansas Jayhawks	71–56	BYU Cougars
Scoring by half: 29–27, 42–29
Pts: David McCormack 16; Rebs: Udoka Azubuike 10; Asts: Devon Dotson 8		Pts: TJ Haws 16; Rebs: Jake Toolson, Connor Harding 7 Asts: TJ Haws 5

Lahaina Civic Center
Lahaina, HI
Attendance: 2,400
Referees: Terry Wymer, Chris Rastatter, Keith Kimble

=== Virginia Tech ===
Series History: BYU leads series 3–0

Broadcasters: Dave Pasch & Bill Walton
Starting Lineups:

- Virginia Tech: Landers Nolley II, Wabissa Bede, Nahiem Alleyne, P.J. Horne, Tyrece Radford
- BYU: Alex Barcello, Jake Toolson, TJ Haws, Dalton Nixon, Kolby Lee

ESPN2

Nov 27
6:30 p.m. HAST

Recap

Virginia Tech Hokies	77–90	BYU Cougars
Scoring by half: 37–35, 40–55
Pts: Landera Nolley II 22; Rebs: Landera Nolley II 7 Asts: Wabissa Bede 7		Pts: TJ Haws 20; Rebs: Jake Toolson 7 Asts: Jake Toolson 8

Lahaina Civic Center
Lahaina, HI
Attendance: 2,400
Referees: Tom Eads, Les Jones, Tim Comer

=== Montana Tech ===
Series History: First Meeting

Broadcasters: Dave McCann & Blaine Fowler
Starting Lineups:

- Montana Tech: Sindou Diallo, Troy Owens Jr., Dylan Pannabecker, Taylor England, Drew Huse
- BYU: Alex Barcello, Jake Toolson, TJ Haws, Dalton Nixon, Kolby Lee

BYUtv

Nov 30
1:00 p.m. MST

Recap

Montana Tech Orediggers	63–98	BYU Cougars
Scoring by half: 35–51, 28–47
Pts: Taylor England 16; Rebs: Taylor England 4 Asts: Taylor England 4		Pts: Jake Toolson 17; Rebs: Alex Barcello, Zac Seljaas 6 Asts: TJ Haws 6

Marriott Center
Provo, UT
Attendance: 10,990
Referees: Deldre Carr, Tom Nally, Lewis Garrison

=== Utah ===
First game Yoeli Childs is eligible to play after being suspended for the first 9 games for NBA Draft paperwork and agent errors.

Series History: BYU leads series 131–128

Broadcasters: Ted Robinson & Matt Muehlebach
Starting Lineups:

- BYU: Alex Barcello, Jake Toolson, Yoeli Childs, TJ Haws, Kolby Lee
- Utah: Timmy Allen, Both Gach, Rylan Jones, Riley Battin, Branden Carlson

P12

Dec 4
6:00 p.m. MST

Recap

BYU Cougars	95–102 (OT)	Utah Utes
Scoring by half: 41–33, 45–53 Overtime: 9–16
Pts: Yoeli Childs 29; Rebs: Jake Toolson 9 Asts: Jake Toolson 6		Pts: Timmy Allen 27; Rebs: Mikael Jantunen 6 Asts: Rylan Jones 6

Huntsman Center
Salt Lake City, UT
Attendance: 11,565
Referees: Greg Nixon, Mike Scyphers, Shawn Lehigh

=== UNLV ===
Series History: UNLV leads series 19–16

Broadcasters: Dave McCann, Blaine Fowler, & Spencer Linton
Starting Lineups:

- UNLV: Cheikh Mbacke Diong, Bryce Hamilton, Amauri Hardy, Vitaliy Shibel, Donnie Tillman
- BYU: Alex Barcello, Jake Toolson, Yoeli Childs, TJ Haws, Kolby Lee

BYUtv

Dec 7
1:00 p.m. MST

Recap

UNLV Runnin' Rebels	50–83	BYU Cougars
Scoring by half: 25-46, 25-37
Pts: Donnie Tillman 13; Rebs: Nick Blair, Cheikh Mback Diong 7 Asts: Donnie Tillman 3		Pts: Dalton Nixon 17; Rebs: Yoeli Childs 14; Asts: TJ Haws 7

Vivint Smart Home Arena
Salt Lake City, UT
Attendance: 11,356
Referees: David Hall, Bob Staffen, Frank Harvey III

=== Nevada ===
Series History: BYU leads series 13–7

Broadcasters: Eric Rothman & Sean Farnham
Starting Lineups:

- Nevada: Robby Robinson, Jalen Harris, Johncarlos Reyes, Lindsey Drew, Jazz Johnson
- BYU: Alex Barcello, Jake Toolson, Yoeli Childs, TJ Haws, Kolby Lee

ESPNU

Dec 10
7:00 p.m. MST

Recap

Nevada Wolfpack	42–75	BYU Cougars
Scoring by half: 22–34, 20–41
Pts: Jalen Harris 15; Rebs: Jalen Harris 7 Asts: Robby Robinson, Nisre Zouzoua, Kane Milling, Lindsey Drew, Zane Meeks 1		Pts: Jake Toolson 15; Rebs: Yoeli Childs 13; Asts: Jake Toolson 6

Marriott Center
Provo, UT
Attendance: 10,570
Referees: John Higgins, Tony Padilla, Verne Harris

=== Utah State ===
Series History: BYU leads series 141–92

Broadcasters: Dave McCann, Blaine Fowler, & Spencer Linton
Starting Lineups:

- Utah State: Sam Merrill, Alphonso Anderson, Abel Porter, Brock Miller, Justin Bean
- BYU: Alex Barcello, Jake Toolson, Yoeli Childs, TJ Haws, Kolby Lee

BYUtv

Dec 14
6:00 p.m. MST

Recap

Utah State Aggies	64–68	BYU Cougars
Scoring by half: 28–35, 36–33
Pts: Alphonso Anderson 14; Rebs: Justin Bean 10; Asts: Abel Porter 4		Pts: Yoeli Childs 20; Rebs: Yoeli Childs 10; Asts: TJ Haws 5

Vivint Smart Home Arena
Salt Lake City, UT
Attendance: 10,291
Referees: Randy McCall, Eric Curry, Rick Randall

=== Weber State ===
Series History: BYU leads series 32–11

Broadcasters: Dave McCann & Blaine Fowler
Starting Lineups:

- Weber State: KJ Cunningham, Kham Davis, Cody John, Jerrick Harding, Michal Kozak
- BYU: Alex Barcello, Jake Toolson, Yoeli Childs, TJ Haws, Dalton Nixon

BYUtv

Dec 21
7:00 p.m. MST

Recap

Weber State Wildcats	61–91	BYU Cougars
Scoring by half: 24–51, 37–40
Pts: Jerrick Harding 27; Rebs: Kham Davis 8 Asts: Kham Davis 5		Pts: Yoeli Childs 28; Rebs: Yoeli Childs 8 Asts: TJ Haws 10

Marriott Center
Provo, UT
Attendance: 11,662
Referees: Bob Staffen, Kelly Self, Glen Mayberry

=== Oral Roberts ===
Series History: BYU leads series 6–0

Broadcasters: Dave McCann, Blaine Fowler, & Spencer Linton
Starting Lineups:

- Oral Roberts: Kevin Obanor, Deondre Burns, Max Abmas, Sam Kearns, Emmanuel Nzekwesi
- BYU: Alex Barcello, Jake Toolson, Yoeli Childs, TJ Haws, Dalton Nixon

BYUtv

Dec 28
7:00 p.m. MST

Recap

Oral Roberts Golden Eagles	73–79	BYU Cougars
Scoring by half: 30–32, 43–47
Pts: Emmanuel Nzekwesi 23; Rebs: Emmanuel Nzekwesi 17; Asts: Deondre Burns 8		Pts: Yoeli Childs 23; Rebs: Dalton Nixon 8 Asts: Jake Toolson 8

Marriott Center
Provo, UT
Attendance: 12,365
Referees: Randy McCall, Kevin Brill, Rick Randall

=== Loyola Marymount ===
Series History: BYU leads series 11–5

Broadcasters: Dave McCann, Blaine Fowler, & Spencer Linton
Starting Lineups:

- Loyola Marymount: Eli Scott, Deovaunta Williams, Jordan Bell, Ivan Alipiev, Erik Johansson
- BYU: Alex Barcello, Jake Toolson, Yoeli Childs, TJ Haws, Dalton Nixon

BYUtv

Jan 4
7:00 p.m. MST

Recap

Loyola Marymount Lions	38–63	BYU Cougars
Scoring by half: 19–24, 19–39
Pts: Eli Scott 15; Rebs: Jonathan Dos Anjos 8 Asts: Ivan Alipiev 5		Pts: Yoeli Childs 19; Rebs: Yoeli Childs 12; Asts: TJ Haws 5

Marriott Center
Provo, UT
Attendance: 12,422
Referees: Ron Brokenbrough, Scott Brown, Dennis Flannery

=== Saint Mary's ===
Series History: Saint Mary's leads series 14–13

Broadcasters: Roxy Bernstein & Corey Williams
Starting Lineups:

- BYU: Alex Barcello, Jake Toolson, Kolby Lee, TJ Haws, Dalton Nixon
- Saint Mary's: Malik Fitts, Dan Fotu, Tanner Krebs, Jordan Ford, Tommy Kuhse

ESPN 2

Jan 9
8:00 p.m. PST

Recap

BYU Cougars	84–87 (OT)	Saint Mary's Gaels
Scoring by half: 34–37, 43–40 Overtime: 7–10
Pts: TJ Haws 29; Rebs: Dalton Nixon, Kolby Lee 6 Asts: Alex Barcello, Jake Toolson, TJ Haws 2		Pts: Jordan Ford 24; Rebs: Malik Fitts 9 Asts: Tommy Kuhse 6

University Credit Union Pavilion
Moraga, CA
Attendance: 3,500
Referees: David Hall, Frank Harvey, Michael Greenstein

=== Portland ===
Series History: BYU leads series 17–2

Broadcasters: Dave McCann, Blaine Fowler, & Jarom Jordan
Starting Lineups:

- Portland: Tahirou Diabate, Jacob Tryon, Malcolm Porter, Isaiah White, Chase Adams
- BYU: Alex Barcello, Jake Toolson, Yoeli Childs, TJ Haws, Dalton Nixon

BYUtv

Jan 11
7:30 p.m. MST

Recap

Portland Pilots	70–96	BYU Cougars
Scoring by half: 30–51, 40–45
Pts: Malcolm Porter 16; Rebs: Theo Akwuba 10; Asts: Jacob Tryon 8		Pts: Zac Seljaas 21; Rebs: Dalton Nixon 11; Asts: TJ Haws 14

Marriott Center
Provo, UT
Attendance: 13,048
Referees: Mark Cook, Jim Schipper, Levon Zakarian

=== San Diego ===
Series History: BYU leads series 13–6

Broadcasters: Dave McCann, Blaine Fowler, & Spencer Linton
Starting Lineups:

- San Diego: Alex Floresca, James Jean-Marie, Braun Hartfield, Joey Calcaterra, Finn Sullivan
- BYU: Alex Barcello, Jake Toolson, TJ Haws, Dalton Nixon, Kolby Lee

BYUtv

Jan 17
7:00 p.m. MST

Recap

San Diego Toreros	70–93	BYU Cougars
Scoring by half: 36–48, 43–40
Pts: Braun Hartfield 21; Rebs: Yauhen Massalski 6 Asts: James Jean-Marie 3		Pts: Kolby Lee 21; Rebs: Zac Seljaas 8 Asts: Jake Toolson 7

Marriott Center
Provo, UT
Attendance: 11,339
Referees: Verne Harris, Tony Padilla, Doran Gotschall

=== Gonzaga ===
Series History: Gonzaga leads series 17–4

Broadcasters: Dave Flemming & Adrian Branch
Starting Lineups:

- BYU: Alex Barcello, Jake Toolson, TJ Haws, Dalton Nixon, Kolby Lee
- Gonzaga: Filip Petrusev, Corey Kispert, Killian Tillie, Ryan Woolridge, Joel Ayayi

ESPN2

Jan 18
7:00 p.m. PST

Recap

BYU Cougars	69–92	Gonzaga Bulldogs
Scoring by half: 31–38, 38–54
Pts: TJ Haws 17; Rebs: Alex Barcello, Jake Toolson, Zac Seljaas 4 Asts: TJ Haws 6		Pts: Killian Tillie 22; Rebs: Killian Tillie 10; Asts: Ryan Woolridge, Joel Ayayi 6

McCarthey Athletic Center
Spokane, WA
Attendance: 6,000
Referees: Michael Greenstein, Michael Irving, Daryl Gelinas

=== Pacific ===
Series History: BYU leads series 9–6

Broadcasters: Ari Wolfe & Dave Miller
Starting Lineups:

- BYU: Alex Barcello, Jake Toolson, Yoeli Childs, TJ Haws, Kolby Lee
- Pacific: Amari McCray, Jahlil Tripp, Pierre Cockrell II, Daniss Jenkins, Broc Finstuen

Stadium/KJZZ

Jan 23
7:00 p.m. PST

Recap

BYU Cougars	74–60	Pacific Tigers
Scoring by half: 33–29, 41–31
Pts: Jake Toolson 28; Rebs: Yoeli Childs 9 Asts: TJ Haws 3		Pts: Jahlil Tripp 18; Rebs: Jahlil Tripp 10; Asts: Justin Moore 3

Spanos Center
Stockton, CA
Attendance: 3,097
Referees: Kevin Brill, Bert Smith, Tom O'Neill

=== San Francisco ===
Series History: BYU leads series 15–8

Broadcasters: Noah Coslov & Dani Klupenger
Starting Lineups:

- BYU: Alex Barcello, Jake Toolson, Yoeli Childs, TJ Haws, Kolby Lee
- San Francisco: Jamaree Bouyea, Josh Kunen, Charles Minlend, Jimbo Lull, Jordan Ratinho

Stadium/KJZZ

Jan 25
2:00 p.m. PST

Recap

BYU Cougars	82–83	San Francisco Dons
Scoring by half: 45–38, 37–45
Pts: TJ Haws 20; Rebs: Yoeli Childs 7 Asts: Yoeli Childs 8		Pts: Khalil Shabazz 32; Rebs: Charles Minlend 7 Asts: Jamaree Bouyea 5

The Sobrato Center
San Francisco, CA
Attendance: 3,006
Referees: Ken Ditty, Glen Mayberry, Verne Harris

=== Pepperdine ===
Series History: BYU leads series 12–9

Broadcasters: Jason Horowitz & Ryan Hollins
Starting Lineups:

- Pepperdine: Sedrick Altman, Colbey Ross, Kessler Edwards, Kameron Edwards, Skylar Chavez
- BYU: Alex Barcello, Jake Toolson, Yoeli Childs, TJ Haws, Kolby Lee

CBSSN

Jan 30
6:30 p.m. MST

Recap

Pepperdine Waves	80–107	BYU Cougars
Scoring by half: 38–46, 42–61
Pts: Kameron Edwards 20; Rebs: Victor Ohia Obioha 7 Asts: Colbey Ross 7		Pts: Jake Toolson 25; Rebs: Yoeli Childs 9 Asts: TJ Haws, Yoeli Childs 6

Marriott Center
Provo, UT
Attendance: 10,939
Referees: Bob Staffen, Shawn Lehigh, Ron Brokenbrough

=== Saint Mary's ===
Series History: Series tied 14–14

Broadcasters: Dave Flemming & Dan Dickau
Starting Lineups:

- Saint Mary's: Jordan Ford, Tommy Kuhse, Malik Fitts, Dan Fotu, Alex Ducas
- BYU: Alex Barcello, Jake Toolson, Yoeli Childs, TJ Haws, Kolby Lee

ESPN2

Feb 1
8:00 p.m. MST

Recap

Saint Mary's Gaels	79–81	BYU Cougars
Scoring by half: 40–43, 39–38
Pts: Malik Fitts 29; Rebs: Malik Fitts 9 Asts: Jordan Ford 4		Pts: TJ Haws 23; Rebs: Zac Seljaas 7 Asts: Jake Toolson 8

Marriott Center
Provo, UT
Attendance: 15,212
Referees: Mike Reed, Kevin Brill, Rick Batsell

=== Portland ===
Series History: BYU leads series 18–2

Broadcasters: Barry Tompkins & Dani Klupenger
Starting Lineups:

- BYU: Alex Barcello, Jake Toolson, Yoeli Childs, TJ Haws, Kolby Lee
- Portland: JoJo Walker, Isaiah White, Chase Adams, Tahirou Diabate, Jacob Tryon

Stadium/KJZZ

Feb 6
7:00 p.m. PST

Recap

BYU Cougars	85–54	Portland Pilots
Scoring by half: 43–31, 42–23
Pts: Jake Toolson, Yoeli Childs 22; Rebs: Kolby Lee 10; Asts: TJ Haws 8		Pts: JoJo Walker 12; Rebs: Jacob Tryon 6 Asts: Quincy Ferebee 3

Chiles Center
Portland, OR
Attendance: 3,013
Referees: Deldre Carr, Rob Rorke, Klaus Endrissat

=== San Francisco ===
Series History: BYU leads series 15–9

Broadcasters: Dave McCann, Blaine Fowler, & Spencer Linton
Starting Lineups:

- San Francisco: Jamaree Bouyea, Jimbo Lull, Josh Kunen, Charles Minlend, Jordan Ratinho
- BYU: Alex Barcello, Jake Toolson, Yoeli Childs, TJ Haws, Kolby Lee

BYUtv

Feb 8
7:30 p.m. MST

Recap

San Francisco Dons	76–90	BYU Cougars
Scoring by half: 25–44, 51–46
Pts: Jimbo Lull 22; Rebs: Jimbo Lull 7 Asts: Khalil Shabazz 4		Pts: Yoeli Childs 32; Rebs: Jake Toolson, Yoeli Childs 6 Asts: Jake Toolson, TJ Haws 7

Marriott Center
Provo, UT
Attendance: 14,757
Referees: Jeff Ketchu, Marc A. Beasley, Dennis Flannery

=== Loyola Marymount ===
Series History: BYU leads series 12–5

Broadcasters: Eric Rothman & Dan Dickau
Starting Lineups:

- BYU: Alex Barcello, Jake Toolson, Yoeli Childs, TJ Haws, Kolby Lee
- Loyola Marymount: Eli Scott, Parker Dortch, Erik Johansson, Lazar Zivanovich, Keli Leaupepe

ESPNU

Feb 13
8:00 p.m. PST

Recap

BYU Cougars	77–54	Loyola Marymount Lions
Scoring by half: 32-24, 45-30
Pts: Alex Barcello 18; Rebs: Yoeli Childs 6 Asts: Jake Toolson 4		Pts: Eli Scott 18; Rebs: Erik Johansson 7 Asts: Eli Scott, Erik Johansson, Keli Leaupepe, Lazar Nekic, Jonathan Dos Anjos, Deovaunta Williams 1

Gersten Pavilion
Los Angeles, CA
Attendance: 1,533
Referees: Verne Harris, Tom Nally, Ryan McDaniel

=== San Diego ===
Series History: BYU leads series 14–6

Broadcasters: John Schriffen & Ryan Hollins
Starting Lineups:

- BYU: Alex Barcello, Jake Toolson, Yoeli Childs, TJ Haws, Kolby Lee
- San Diego: Alex Floresca, James Jean-Marie, Braun Hartfield, Joey Calcaterra, Marion Humphery

CBSSN

Feb 15
7:00 p.m. PST

Recap

BYU Cougars	72–71	San Diego Toreros
Scoring by half: 32-33, 40-38
Pts: TJ Haws, Yoeli Childs 17; Rebs: Yoeli Childs 7 Asts: TJ Haws 10		Pts: Finn Sullivan 16; Rebs: Finn Sullivan 6 Asts: Finn Sullivan 5

Jenny Craig Center
San Diego, CA
Attendance: 2,711
Referees: Mike Scyphers, Rick Batsell, Scott Brown

=== Santa Clara ===
Series History: BYU leads series 27–6

Broadcasters: Michael Grady & Ryan Hollins
Starting Lineups:

- Santa Clara: Trey Wertz, Jaden Bediako, Josip Vrankic, Keshawn Justice, Jalen Williams
- BYU: Alex Barcello, Jake Toolson, Yoeli Childs, TJ Haws, Kolby Lee

CBSSN

Feb 20
7:00 p.m. MST

Recap

Santa Clara Broncos	75–85	#23 BYU Cougars
Scoring by half: 30–40, 45–45
Pts: Josip Vrankic 28; Rebs: Josip Vrankic 11; Asts: DJ Mitchell 6		Pts: TJ Haws 28; Rebs: Yoeli Childs 11; Asts: TJ Haws 9; 3 Cougars (Childs, Haws, & Toolson) w/ 20+ points

Marriott Center
Provo, UT
Attendance: 12,757
Referees: Kevin Brill, Kelly Self, Larry Scirotto

=== Gonzaga ===
Series History: Gonzaga leads series 17–5

Broadcasters: Dave Flemming & Sean Farnham
Starting Lineups:

- Gonzaga: Filip Petrusev, Ryan Woolridge, Joel Ayayi, Corey Kispert, Killian Tillie
- BYU: Alex Barcello, Jake Toolson, Yoeli Childs, TJ Haws, Kolby Lee

ESPN2

Feb 22
8:00 p.m. MST

Recap

#2 Gonzaga Bulldogs	78–91	#23 BYU Cougars
Scoring by half: 38–46, 40–45
Pts: Killian Tillie 18; Rebs: Joel Ayayi, Drew Timme 8 Asts: Ryan Woolridge, Joel Ayayi 4		Pts: Yoeli Childs 28; Rebs: Yoeli Childs 10; Asts: TJ Haws 8

Marriott Center
Provo, UT
Attendance: 18,987
Referees: David Hall, Larry Spaulding, Brad Ferrie

=== Pepperdine ===
Series History: BYU leads series 13–9

Broadcasters: Rich Waltz & Dan Dickau
Starting Lineups:

- BYU: Alex Barcello, Jake Toolson, Yoeli Childs, TJ Haws, Kolby Lee
- Pepperdine: Sedrick Altman, Colbey Ross, Kessler Edwards, Kameron Edwards, Skylar Chavez

CBSSN

Feb 29
3:00 p.m. PST

Recap

#17 BYU Cougars	81–64	Pepperdine Waves
Scoring by half: 32–35, 49–29
Pts: Yoeli Childs 38; Rebs: Yoeli Childs 14; Asts: TJ Haws 13		Pts: Kessler Edwards 24; Rebs: Kessler Edwards 11; Asts: Kessler Edwards 4

Firestone Fieldhouse
Malibu, CA
Attendance: 3,104
Referees: Michael Irving, Bill Vinovich, Tom Spitznagel

=== WCC Semifinal: Saint Mary's ===
Series History: Saint Mary's leads series 15–14

Broadcasters: Bob Wischusen & Sean Farnham
Starting Lineups:

- Saint Mary's: Tanner Krebs, Jordan Ford, Tommy Kuhse, Malik Fitts, Dan Fotu
- BYU: Alex Barcello, Jake Toolson, Yoeli Childs, Gavin Baxter, TJ Haws

ESPN2

Mar 9
8:30 p.m. PDT

Saint Mary's Gaels	51–50	#14 BYU Cougars
Scoring by half: 20–26, 31–24
Pts: Tanner Krebs 18; Rebs: Malik Fitts 8 Asts: Tanner Krebs, Tommy Kuhse 2		Pts: Yoeli Childs 23; Rebs: Yoeli Childs 10; Asts: TJ Haws 4

Orleans Arena
Paradise, NV
Attendance: 7,471
Referees: Randy McCall, Tony Padilla, David Hall

== Rankings ==
Ranking movements Legend: ██ Increase in ranking ██ Decrease in ranking — = Not ranked RV = Received votes т = Tied with team above or below
	Week																			
Poll	Pre	1	2	3	4	5	6	7	8	9	10	11	12	13	14	15	16	17	18	Final
AP	—	—	—	—	—	—	RV	RV	RV	RV	RV	RV	—	RV	RV	23	17	15	14	18
Coaches	—	—	—	—	—	—	—	—	—	—	—	—	—	RV	RV	RV	18	15-T	16	16
