= 2017–18 BYU Cougars men's basketball team =

American college basketball season

2017–18 BYU Cougars men's basketball

NIT, First Round
- Conference: West Coast Conference
- Record: 24–11 (11–7 WCC)
- Head coach: Dave Rose (13th season)
- Assistant coaches: Tim LaComb (8th season); Quincy Lewis (3rd season); Heath Schroyer (1st w/ Rose, 5th overall season)
- Home arena: Marriott Center

2017–18 West Coast Conference men's basketball standings
	Conf.				Overall
Team	W		L	PCT	W		L	PCT
No. 8 Gonzaga †	17	–	1	.944	32	–	5	.865
No. 25 Saint Mary's	16	–	2	.889	30	–	6	.833
BYU	11	–	7	.611	24	–	11	.686
San Diego	9	–	9	.500	20	–	14	.588
San Francisco	9	–	9	.500	22	–	17	.564
Pacific	9	–	9	.500	14	–	18	.438
Santa Clara	8	–	10	.444	11	–	20	.355
Loyola Marymount	5	–	13	.278	11	–	20	.355
Portland	4	–	14	.222	10	–	22	.313
Pepperdine	2	–	16	.111	6	–	26	.188
† Conference tournament winner Rankings from AP poll

The 2017–18 BYU Cougars men's basketball team represented Brigham Young University in the 2017–18 NCAA Division I men's basketball season. It was head coach Dave Rose's 13th season at BYU and the Cougars seventh season as members of the West Coast Conference. The Cougars played their home games at the Marriott Center in Provo, Utah. They finished the season 24–11, 11–7 in West Coast Conference play to finish in third place. As the No. 3 seed in the WCC tournament, they defeated San Diego in the quarterfinals and Saint Mary's in the semifinals before losing to Gonzaga in the championship game. They received an at-large bid to the National Invitation Tournament where they were defeated by Stanford in the first round.

== Previous season ==
The Cougars finished the 2016–17 season 22–12, 12–6 in WCC play to finish in third place. They defeated Loyola Marymount in the quarterfinals of the WCC tournament to advance to the semifinals where they lost to Saint Mary's. They received an invitation to the National Invitation Tournament where they lost in the first round to Texas–Arlington.

== Offseason ==
=== Departures ===
Name	Number	Pos.	Height	Weight	Year	Hometown	Notes
Zach Frampton	2	G	6'3"	185	Freshman	Alpine, UT	Transferred to Dixie State
Nick Emery	4	G	6'2"	185	Junior	Alpine, Utah	Withdrew from college due NCAA violations
L.J. Rose	5	G	6'3"	200	Senior	Houston, TX	Graduated
Eric Mika	12	F	6'10"	230	Sophomore	Alpine, UT	Went pro and signed with U.S. Victoria Libertas Pallacanestro of Lega Basket Serie A in Italy
Colby Leifson	13	G	6'4"	190	Freshman	Suwanee, GA	LDS mission (returning in 2019)
Kyle Davis	21	F	6'8"	225	RS Senior	Draper, UT	Graduated
Steven Beo	25	G	6'3"	180	Freshman	Richland, WA	Transferred to Eastern Washington
Jamal Aytes	40	F	6'6"	235	RS Junior	San Diego, CA	Transferred to Southern Utah
Corbin Kaufusi	44	F	6'10"	255	Junior	Provo, Utah	Left team to focus on football

=== Incoming transfers ===
Name	Number	Pos.	Height	Weight	Year	Hometown	Previous School
Jahshire Hardnett	0	G	6'0"	185	Sophomore	Gulfport, MS	Transferred from Chipola College.
Kajon Brown	13	G	6'5"	200	Junior	Houston, TX	Transferred from Lee College.
McKay Cannon	24	G	6'0"	185	Junior	Shelley, ID	Transferred from Weber State; will red-shirt the season.

== Recruiting class of 2017 ==
College recruiting
Name	Hometown	School	Height	Weight	Commit date
Kolby Lee #20 C	Meridian, ID	Rocky Mountain High School	6 ft 9 in (2.06 m)	260 lb (120 kg)	Aug 3, 2016
Kolby Lee #20 C	Recruit ratings: Scout: Rivals: 247Sports: (81)				
Christian PoPoola Jr. #46 SG	Las Vegas, NV	Bishop Gorman High School	6 ft 4 in (1.93 m)	190 lb (86 kg)	Aug 3, 2016
Christian PoPoola Jr. #46 SG	Recruit ratings: Scout: Rivals: 247Sports: (78)				
Overall recruit ranking: Scout: nr Rivals: nr 247Sports: 109 ESPN: nr
Note: In many cases, Scout, Rivals, 247Sports, On3, and ESPN may conflict in their listings of height and weight.; In these cases, the average was taken. ESPN grades are on a 100-point scale.; Sources: "BYU 2017 Basketball Commitments". Rivals.; "2017 BYU Basketball Commits". Scout.; "ESPN". ESPN.; "Scout.com Team Recruiting Rankings". Scout.; "2017 Team Ranking". Rivals.; "2017 BYU Basketball Commits". 247Sports.

=== Recruiting class of 2018 ===
College recruiting (2018)
Name	Hometown	School	Height	Weight	Commit date
Connor Harding #29 SG	Pocatello, ID	Highland High School	6 ft 5 in (1.96 m)	175 lb (79 kg)	Jul 29, 2015
Connor Harding #29 SG	Recruit ratings: Scout: Rivals: 247Sports: (80)				
Gavin Baxter #24 SF	Provo, UT	Timpview High School	6 ft 7 in (2.01 m)	175 lb (79 kg)	Jun 8, 2015
Gavin Baxter #24 SF	Recruit ratings: Scout: Rivals: 247Sports: (80)				
Overall recruit ranking: Scout: nr Rivals: nr 247Sports: 109 ESPN: nr
Note: In many cases, Scout, Rivals, 247Sports, On3, and ESPN may conflict in their listings of height and weight.; In these cases, the average was taken. ESPN grades are on a 100-point scale.; Sources: "BYU 2018 Basketball Commitments". Rivals.; "2018 BYU Basketball Commits". Scout.; "ESPN". ESPN.; "Scout.com Team Recruiting Rankings". Scout.; "2018 Team Ranking". Rivals.; "2018 BYU Basketball Commits". 247Sports.

=== 2017–18 return missionaries ===
BYU's roster will feature four missionaries for the new season. First up is Zac Seljaas who returns after coming home early for a shoulder injury.

College recruiting (2015)
Name	Hometown	School	Height	Weight	Commit date
Zac Seljaas; G	Bountiful, Utah	Bountiful	6 ft 7 in (2.01 m)	210 lb (95 kg)	May 19, 2014
Zac Seljaas; G	Recruit ratings: Scout: Rivals: 247Sports: (75)				
Overall recruit ranking: Scout: nr Rivals: nr 247Sports: 109 ESPN: nr
Note: In many cases, Scout, Rivals, 247Sports, On3, and ESPN may conflict in their listings of height and weight.; In these cases, the average was taken. ESPN grades are on a 100-point scale.; Sources: "BYU 2015 Basketball Commitments". Rivals.; "2015 BYU Basketball Commits". Scout.; "ESPN". ESPN.; "Scout.com Team Recruiting Rankings". Scout.; "2015 Team Ranking". Rivals.; "2015 BYU Basketball Commits". 247Sports.

Up next Ryan Andrus and Dalton Nixon return.

College recruiting (2014)
Name	Hometown	School	Height	Weight	Commit date
Ryan Andrus; F	American Fork, Utah	American Fork	6 ft 8 in (2.03 m)	200 lb (91 kg)	Jul 31, 2013
Ryan Andrus; F	Recruit ratings: Scout: Rivals: (70)				
Dalton Nixon; F	Orem, Utah	Orem	6 ft 7 in (2.01 m)	190 lb (86 kg)	Aug 12, 2012
Dalton Nixon; F	Recruit ratings: Scout: Rivals: (75)				
Overall recruit ranking: Scout: 22 Rivals: 17 ESPN: 22
Note: In many cases, Scout, Rivals, 247Sports, On3, and ESPN may conflict in their listings of height and weight.; In these cases, the average was taken. ESPN grades are on a 100-point scale.; Sources: "BYU 2014 Basketball Commitments". Rivals.; "2014 BYU Basketball Commits". Scout.; "ESPN". ESPN.; "Scout.com Team Recruiting Rankings". Scout.; "2014 Team Ranking". Rivals.

Rounding out the group of four was Luke Worthington.

College recruiting (2013)
Name	Hometown	School	Height	Weight	Commit date
Luke Worthington; F	Mequon, Wisconsin	Homestead	6 ft 9 in (2.06 m)	240 lb (110 kg)	Sep 3, 2012
Luke Worthington; F	Recruit ratings: Scout: Rivals: (74)				
Overall recruit ranking: Scout: 22 Rivals: 17 ESPN: 16
Note: In many cases, Scout, Rivals, 247Sports, On3, and ESPN may conflict in their listings of height and weight.; In these cases, the average was taken. ESPN grades are on a 100-point scale.; Sources: "BYU 2013 Basketball Commitments". Rivals.; "2013 BYU Basketball Commits". Scout.; "ESPN". ESPN.; "Scout.com Team Recruiting Rankings". Scout.; "2013 Team Ranking". Rivals.

== 2017–18 media ==
=== Nu Skin BYU Sports Network ===
BYU Radio- Flagship Station, Nationwide (Dish Network 980, Sirius XM 143, and byuradio.org)
KSL 102.7 FM and 1160 AM- (Salt Lake City/ Provo, UT and ksl.com)
KTHK- Blackfoot/ Idaho Falls/ Pocatello/ Rexburg, ID
KMGR- Manti, UT
KSUB- Cedar City, UT
KDXU- St. George, UT

- Play-by-Play: Greg Wrubell or Jason Shepherd
- Analysts: Mark Durrant or Terry Nashiff
- Studio Hosts: Jason Shepherd or Ben Bagley

== Roster ==
2017–18 BYU Cougars men's basketball team
Players
Coaches

Pos.	#	Name	Height	Weight	Year	Previous school	Hometown
G	0	Jahshire Hardnett	6 ft 0 in (1.83 m)	185 lb (84 kg)	So	Gulfport; Chipola	Gulfport, MS
G	1	Rylan Bergersen	6 ft 6 in (1.98 m)	200 lb (91 kg)	Fr	Borah; Link Year	Boise, ID
G	2	Zac Seljaas	6 ft 7 in (2.01 m)	215 lb (98 kg)	So	Bountiful	Bountiful, UT
G	3	Elijah Bryant (C)	6 ft 5 in (1.96 m)	210 lb (95 kg)	RS Jr	New Hampton School; Elon	Gwinnett, GA
F	10	Ryan Andrus	6 ft 11 in (2.11 m)	240 lb (109 kg)	So	American Fork	American Fork, UT
G	13	Kajon Brown	6 ft 5 in (1.96 m)	200 lb (91 kg)	Jr	Helen Cox; Tulsa; Lee	Harvey, LA
C	15	Payton Dastrup	6 ft 10 in (2.08 m)	250 lb (113 kg)	So	Mountain View	Mesa, AZ
F	23	Yoeli Childs	6 ft 8 in (2.03 m)	225 lb (102 kg)	So	Bingham	South Jordan, UT
G	24	McKay Cannon (W) (redshirt)	6 ft 0 in (1.83 m)	185 lb (84 kg)	Jr	Highlands Ranch; Weber State	Highlands Ranch, CO
G	30	T. J. Haws	6 ft 4 in (1.93 m)	170 lb (77 kg)	So	Lone Peak	Alpine, UT
F	31	Braiden Shaw	6 ft 9 in (2.06 m)	210 lb (95 kg)	Jr	Eagle	Eagle, ID
F	33	Dalton Nixon	6 ft 7 in (2.01 m)	215 lb (98 kg)	RS So	Orem	Orem, UT
F	40	Kolby Lee (redshirt)	6 ft 9 in (2.06 m)	260 lb (118 kg)	Fr	Rocky Mountain	Meridian, UT
F	41	Luke Worthington (C)	6 ft 10 in (2.08 m)	235 lb (107 kg)	Jr	Homestead	Mequon, WI

Head coach

- Dave Rose (Houston)

Assistant coach(es)

- Tim LaComb- Assoc. Head Coach (Utah)
- Quincy Lewis (Wagner)
- Heath Schroyer (Armstrong Atlantic State)

Legend

- (C) Team captain
- (S) Suspended
- (I) Ineligible
- (W) Walk-on
- Injured
- Current redshirt

- Nick Emery (G- #4) was originally part of the roster. However a combination of an NCAA investigation and an off-season divorce caused him to withdraw from school for the 2017–18 season.

== Schedule and results ==
The 2017–18 non-conferesnce schedule was announced on July 11, 2017. Highlights on the schedule include a trip to defending Ivy League champions Princeton, a rematch with UT Arlington (who ended BYU's season in 2016–17), Barclay's Center Classic matches against Alabama and UMass, and four in-state opponents in Utah Valley, Utah State, Weber State (as part of the inaugural Beehive Classic), and Utah.

Date time, TV	Rank^{#}	Opponent^{#}	Result	Record	Site (attendance) city, state
Exhibition
Oct 27, 2017*; 7:30 pm		at New Mexico; Charity Exhibition for Hurricane Victims	W 79–73	–	Dreamstyle Arena; Albuquerque, NM
Nov 1, 2017*; 7:00 pm, BYUtv		Westminster	W 76–62	–	Marriott Center; Provo, UT
Nov 8, 2017*; 7:00 pm, BYUtv		Colorado College	W 95–35	–	Marriott Center; Provo, UT
Non-conference regular season
Nov 11, 2017*; 7:00 pm, BYUtv		Mississippi Valley State	W 91–61	1–0	Marriott Center (14,019); Provo, UT
Nov 15, 2017*; 5:00 pm, NBCSCA		at Princeton	W 65–56	2–0	Jadwin Gymnasium (1,842); Princeton, NJ
Nov 18, 2017*; 7:00 pm, BYUtv		UT Arlington; Barclays Center Classic	L 75–89	2–1	Marriott Center (13,363); Provo, UT
Nov 21, 2017*; 7:00 pm, BYUtv		Niagara; Barclays Center Classic	W 95–88	3–1	Marriott Center (10,791); Provo, UT
Nov 24, 2017*; 12:30 pm, Stadium		vs. No. 25 Alabama; Barclays Center Classic	L 59–71	3–2	Steinberg Wellness Center (1,240); Brooklyn, NY
Nov 25, 2017*; 12:30 pm, Stadium		vs. UMass; Barclays Center Classic	W 68–66	4–2	Barclays Center (3,469); Brooklyn, NY
Nov 29, 2017*; 7:00 pm, BYUtv		at Utah Valley; UCCU Crosstown Clash/Old Oquirrh Bucket	W 85–58	5–2	UCCU Center (7,574); Orem, UT
Dec 2, 2017*; 7:00 pm, ATTRM		at Utah State; Old Oquirrh Bucket	W 75–66	6–2	Dee Glen Smith Spectrum (10,206); Logan, UT
Dec 6, 2017*; 7:00 pm, BYUtv		Illinois State	W 80–68	7–2	Marriott Center (12,250); Provo, UT
Dec 9, 2017*; 8:00 pm, BYUtv		vs. Weber State; Beehive Classic/Old Oquirrh Bucket	W 74–68	8–2	Vivint Smart Home Arena (7,729); Salt Lake City, UT
Dec 16, 2017*; 9:00 pm, ESPN2		Utah; Old Oquirrh Bucket/Deseret First Duel	W 77–65	9–2	Marriott Center (16,272); Provo, UT
Dec 21, 2017*; 7:00 pm, BYUtv		Idaho State	W 85–71	10–2	Marriott Center (14,660); Provo, UT
Dec 23, 2017*; 7:00 pm, BYUtv		Texas Southern	W 73–52	11–2	Marriott Center (14,583); Provo, UT
WCC regular season
Dec 28, 2017; 7:00 pm, BYUtv		Portland	W 69–45	12–2 (1–0)	Marriott Center (16,592); Provo, UT
Dec 30, 2017; 2:00 pm, ESPNU		Saint Mary's	L 64–74 ^{OT}	12–3 (1–1)	Marriott Center (16,212); Provo, UT
Jan 4, 2018; 9:00 pm, ATTRM		at San Francisco	W 69–59	13–3 (2–1)	War Memorial Gymnasium (1,837); San Francisco, CA
Jan 6, 2018; 8:00 pm, BYUtv		at Pacific	L 66–67	13–4 (2–2)	Alex G. Spanos Center (2,897); Stockton, CA
Jan 11, 2018; 7:00 pm, BYUtv		Pepperdine	W 83–63	14–4 (3–2)	Marriott Center (13,223); Provo, UT
Jan 13, 2018; 7:00 pm, BYUtv		at Santa Clara	W 84–50	15–4 (4–2)	Leavey Center (3,369); Santa Clara, CA
Jan 18, 2018; 9:00 pm, ESPNU		Loyola Marymount	W 82–67	16–4 (5–2)	Marriott Center (12,109); Provo, UT
Jan 20, 2018; 7:00 pm, BYUtv		San Diego	W 74–58	17–4 (6–2)	Marriott Center (13,449); Provo, UT
Jan 25, 2018; 9:00 pm, ESPN2		at No. 16 Saint Mary's	L 62–75	17–5 (6–3)	McKeon Pavilion (3,500); Moraga, CA
Jan 27, 2018; 7:00 pm, BYUtv		Pacific	W 80–65	18–5 (7–3)	Marriott Center (16,456); Provo, UT
Feb 1, 2018; 9:00 pm, ATTRM		at Loyola Marymount	L 69–76	18–6 (7–4)	Gersten Pavilion (1,180); Los Angeles, CA
Feb 3, 2018; 8:00 pm, ESPN2		at No. 14 Gonzaga; Rivalry	L 60–68	18–7 (7–5)	McCarthey Athletic Center (6,000); Spokane, WA
Feb 8, 2018; 9:00 pm, ESPNU		Santa Clara	W 80–58	19–7 (8–5)	Marriott Center (11,638); Provo, UT
Feb 10, 2018; 2:00 pm, BYUtv/ATTRM		San Francisco	W 75–73 ^{OT}	20–7 (9–5)	Marriott Center (12,815); Provo, UT
Feb 15, 2018; 8:00 pm, BYUtv		at Pepperdine	W 75–70 ^{OT}	21–7 (10–5)	Firestone Fieldhouse (1,504); Malibu, CA
Feb 17, 2018; 2:00 pm, BYUtv/ATTRM		at San Diego	L 62–75	21–8 (10–6)	Jenny Craig Pavilion; San Diego, CA
Feb 22, 2018; 9:00 pm, ESPNU		at Portland	W 72–60	22–8 (11–6)	Chiles Center (3,003); Portland, OR
Feb 24, 2018; 6:00 pm, ESPN2		No. 6 Gonzaga; Rivalry	L 65–79	22–9 (11–7)	Marriott Center (18,987); Provo, UT
WCC tournament
Mar 3, 2018; 12:00 pm, BYUtv/ATTRM	(3)	vs. (6) San Diego; Quarterfinals	W 85–79	23–9	Orleans Arena (7,279); Paradise, NV
Mar 5, 2018; 8:30 pm, ESPN2	(3)	vs. (2) No. 20 Saint Mary's; Semifinals	W 85–72	24–9	Orleans Arena (8,296); Paradise, NV
Mar 6, 2018; 7:00 pm, ESPN	(3)	vs. (1) No. 6 Gonzaga; Championship/Rivalry	L 54–74	24–10	Orleans Arena (8,030); Paradise, NV
NIT
Mar 14, 2018*; 8:00 pm, ESPNU	(6)	at (3) Stanford; First round – USC Bracket	L 83–86	24–11	Maples Pavilion (1,839); Sanford, CA
*Non-conference game. ^{#}Rankings from AP Poll. (#) Tournament seedings in parentheses. All times are in Mountain.

== Game summaries ==
=== Cougar Tipoff ===
Broadcasters: Spencer Linton & Jarom Jordan
Starting Lineups:

- BYU Blue: Zac Seljaas, Elijah Bryant, Nick Emery, Yoeli Childs, TJ Haws
- BYU White: Jahshire Hardnett, Rylan Bergensen, Kajon Brown, Dalton Nixon, Luke Worthington

Oct 25	BYU Blue	88–68	BYU White	Marriott Center Provo, UT
7:05 p.m. MDT	Scoring by half: 44–24, 44–44
YouTube	Pts: Yoeli Childs 23; Rebs: Zac Seljaas 8 Asts: Elijah Bryant 8	Recap	Pts: Jahshire Hardnett 14; Rebs: Luke Worthington 6 Asts: Jahshire Hardnett 7	Attendance: N/A; Referees: DG Nelson, Chad Shephard, Scott Deboe

=== Exhibition: New Mexico ===
Broadcasters: Jeff Siembieda & Hunter Greene (New Mexico Radio Network exclusive)
Starting Lineups:

- BYU: Elijah Bryant, Nick Emery, Yoeli Childs, TJ Haws, Luke Worthington
- New Mexico: Chris McNeal, Sam Logwood, Joe Furstinger, Dane Kuiper, Troy Simons

Oct 27	BYU Cougars	79–73	New Mexico Lobos	Dreamstyle Arena Albuquerque, NM
7:30 p.m. MDT	Scoring by half: 37–36, 42–37
	Pts: TJ Haws 14; Rebs: Yoeli Childs 19; Asts: TJ Haws 6	Recap	Pts: Sam Logwood 23; Rebs: Sam Logwood 6 Asts: Antino Jackson 5	Attendance: N/A; Referees: Randy McCall, Michael Irving, Shawn Lehigh

=== Exhibition: Westminster ===
Broadcasters: Dave McCann, Blaine Fowler, & Spencer Linton
Starting Lineups:

- Westminster: Sam Orchard, Dayon Goodman, Quincy Bair, Jarred Laws, Scott Cook
- BYU : Elijah Bryant, Nick Emery, Yoeli Childs, TJ Haws, Luke Worthington

Nov 1	Westminster Griffins	62–76	BYU Cougars	Marriott Center Provo, UT
7:05 p.m. MDT	Scoring by half: 21–38, 41–38
BYUtv	Pts: Quincy Bair 17; Rebs: Dayon Goodman 9 Asts: Dayon Goodman 4	Recap	Pts: Yoeli Childs 25; Rebs: Yoeli Childs 14; Asts: TJ Haws 7	Attendance: 10,951; Referees: Casey McClellan, Scott DeBo, Ryan Holmes

=== Exhibition: Colorado College ===
Broadcasters: Dave McCann, Blaine Fowler, & Spencer Linton
Starting Lineups:

- Colorado College: Eric Houska, Bobby Roth, CooXioEli Black, Ryan Young, Chris Martin
- BYU: Zac Seljaas, Elijah Bryant, Yoeli Childs, TJ Haws, Luke Worthington

Nov 8	Colorado College Tigers	35–95	BYU Cougars	Marriott Center Provo, UT
7:05 p.m. MST	Scoring by half: 14–48, 21–47
BYUtv	Pts: Chris Martin 9 Rebs: CooXioEli Black 7 Asts: Eric Houska 3	Recap	Pts: Zac Seljaas 19; Rebs: Yoeli Childs 17; Asts: Elijah Bryant, Yoeli Childs, TJ Haws, Luke Worthington 3	Attendance: 11,294; Referees: David Hall, Verne Harris, Deron White

=== Mississippi Valley State ===
Broadcasters: Dave McCann, Blaine Fowler, & Spencer Linton
Series History: BYU leads 2–0
Starting Lineups:

- MVSU: Dante Scott, Jordan Evans, Tereke Eckwood, Arinze Anakwenze, Jaal Watson
- BYU: Zac Seljaas, Elijah Bryant, Yoeli Childs, TJ Haws, Luke Worthington

Nov 11	Mississippi Valley State Delta Devils	61–91	BYU Cougars	Marriott Center Provo, UT
7:05 p.m. MST	Scoring by half: 23–47, 38–44
BYUtv	Pts: Tereke Eckwood 16; Rebs: Dante Scott 6 Asts: Jordan Evans 4	Recap	Pts: Elijah Bryant 27; Rebs: Yoeli Childs 10; Asts: Yoeli Childs 6	Attendance: 14,019; Referees: Tommy Nunez, Larry Spaulding, Brad Ferrie

=== Princeton ===
Broadcasters: Derek Jones & Noah Savage
Series History: BYU leads 5–0
Starting Lineups:

- BYU: Zac Seljaas, Elijah Bryant, Yoeli Childs, TJ Haws, Luke Worthington
- Princeton: Devin Cannady, Amir Bell, Myles Stephens, Ryan Schwieger, Alec Brennan

Nov 15	BYU Cougars	65–56	Princeton Tigers	Jadwin Gymnasium Princeton, NJ
7:00 p.m. EST	Scoring by half: 29–29, 36–27
NBCS PHIL+	Pts: Elijah Bryant 22; Rebs: Yoeli Childs 11; Asts: Elijah Bryant 2		Pts: Devin Cannady 19; Rebs: Myles Stephens 8 Asts: Devin Cannady, Amir Bell 3	Attendance: 1,842; Referees: Tim Kelly, Sean Hull, Robert Riley

=== UT Arlington ===
Broadcasters: Dave McCann, Blaine Fowler, & Spencer Linton
Series History: Series even 1–1
Starting Lineups:

- UT Arlington: Erick Neal, Nathan Hawkins, Kaelon Wilson, Johnny Hamilton, Kevin Hervey
- BYU: Zac Seljaas, Elijah Bryant, Yoeli Childs, TJ Haws, Luke Worthington

Nov 18	UT Arlington Mavericks	89–75	BYU Cougars	Marriott Center Provo, UT
7:05 p.m. MST	Scoring by half: 43–26, 46–47
BYUtv	Pts: Kevin Hervey 23; Rebs: Kevin Hervey 9 Asts: Erick Neal 10	Recap	Pts: Elijah Bryant 15; Rebs: Dalton Nixon 8 Asts: TJ Haws 8	Attendance: 13,636; Referees: Randy McCall, Kevin Brill, Ryan Holmes

=== Niagara ===
Broadcasters: Dave McCann, Blaine Fowler, & Spencer Linton
Series History: BYU leads 5–2
Starting Lineups:

- Niagara: Chris Barton, Kahlil Dukes, Marvin Prochet, Matt Scott, Dominic Robb
- BYU: Jahshire Hardnett, Zac Seljaas, Yoeli Childs, TJ Haws, Luke Worthington

Nov 15	Niagara Purple Eagles	88–95	BYU Cougars	Marriott Center Provo, UT
7:05 p.m. MST	Scoring by half: 34–31, 54–64
BYUtv	Pts: Matt Scott 36; Rebs: Matt Scott, Domimic Robb 7 Asts: Kahlil Dukes, James Towns 3	Recap	Pts: Elijah Bryant 22; Rebs: Elijah Bryant 7 Asts: TJ Haws 6	Attendance: 10,791; Referees: Gregory Nixon, Tommy Nunez, Kelly Pfeifer

=== Alabama ===
Broadcasters: Chris Hassel, Tim Doyle, & Kristen Balboni
Series History: Alabama leads 1–0
Starting Lineups:

- BYU: Jahshire Hardnett, Elijah Bryant, Yoeli Childs, TJ Haws, Luke Worthington
- Alabama: Donta Hall, Collin Sexton, Daniel Giddens, Dazon Ingram, John Petty

Nov 24	BYU Cougars	59–71	#25 Alabama Crimson Tide	Steinberg Wellness Center Brooklyn, NY
2:30 p.m. EST	Scoring by half: 31–42, 28–29
Stadium	Pts: Yoeli Childs 21; Rebs: Yoeli Childs 11; Asts: TJ Haws 6	Recap	Pts: John Petty 16; Rebs: Donta Hall 9 Asts: Collin Sexton, Dazon Ingram, Herbert Jones 3	Attendance: 1,240; Referees: Marques Pettigrew, Bill Jacobson, Bret Smith

=== UMass ===
Broadcasters: Chris Hassel, Tim Doyle, & Kristen Balboni
Series History: BYU leads 5–0
Starting Lineups:

- BYU: Jahshire Hardnett, Elijah Bryant, Yoeli Childs, TJ Haws, Luke Worthington
- UMass: Malik Hines, Luwane Pipkins, C.J. Anderson, Rayshawn Miller, Rashaan Holloway

Nov 25	BYU Cougars	68–66	UMass Minutemen	Barclays Center Brooklyn, NY
2:30 p.m. EST	Scoring by half: 28–38, 40–28
Stadium	Pts: Yoeli Childs 19; Rebs: Yoeli Childs 11; Asts: Yoeli Childs 5		Pts: Rashaan Holloway 16; Rebs: Rashaan Holloway, Chris Baldwin 8 Asts: C.J. Anderson 7	Referees: Ed Corbett, Bert Smith, Tom Eades
