= Jordan Ford =

American basketball player (born 1998)

- Ford with ALBA Berlin in 2026

No. 3 – Alba Berlin
- Position: Point guard / shooting guard
- League: BBL

Personal information
- Born: May 26, 1998 (age 28) Citrus Heights, California, U.S.
- Listed height: 6 ft 1 in (1.85 m)
- Listed weight: 175 lb (79 kg)

Career information
- High school: Folsom (Folsom, California)
- College: Saint Mary's (2016–2020)
- NBA draft: 2020: undrafted
- Playing career: 2021–present

Career history
- 2021: Agua Caliente Clippers
- 2021: Peristeri
- 2021–2022: Agua Caliente Clippers
- 2022–2023: Stockton Kings
- 2023–2024: Sacramento Kings
- 2023–2024: →Stockton Kings
- 2024–2025: Aquila Trento
- 2025: Trapani Shark
- 2026: Bahçeşehir Koleji
- 2026–present: Alba Berlin

Career highlights
- Italian Cup winner (2025); 2× First-team All-WCC (2019, 2020)
- Stats at NBA.com
- Stats at Basketball Reference

Jordan Matthew Ford (born May 26, 1998) is an American professional basketball player for Alba Berlin of the Basketball Bundesliga (BBL). He played college basketball for the Saint Mary's Gaels.

== Early life ==
Ford learned the game of chess at the age of four with his father, Cuzear, serving as his teacher. He began beating adults before winning two California state titles and was ranked seventh in the nation in his age bracket. However, he quit playing competitively at the age of eight to focus on basketball. Ford attended Folsom High School, playing under coach Mike Wall. He scored 34 points in a playoff game against Sacramento High School in March 2016. He was named The Sacramento Bee's player of the year twice. He committed to play for Saint Mary's because he liked the structured offense, spurning offers from Gonzaga, California, Oregon and Oregon State.

== College career ==
As a freshman, Ford considered redshirting, but ultimately came off the bench as a backup to Joe Rahon, who encouraged him to focus on his defense. In the summer of 2017, Ford was diagnosed with epiglottitis and ended up in the hospital, losing the 12 pounds he gained lifting weights. He scored 27 against BYU in the 2018 West Coast Conference (WCC) tournament. Ford had 19 points against Southeastern Louisiana in the first round of the 2018 NIT and made a SportsCenter top-10 play when he took a pass from Emmett Naar and did a double-spin move to complete a layup off the glass. As a sophomore, Ford averaged 11.1 points, 2.7 rebounds, and 1.6 assists per game, shooting 50.8 percent from the field and 44.3 percent from behind the arc. Ford scored a career-high 35 points on 11-of-17 shooting in a 92–63 win over Utah Valley on November 13, 2018. As a junior, Ford was second in the WCC in scoring with 21.1 points per game to go with 2.5 assists, 2.8 rebounds, and 1.3 steals per game. He helped lead the Gaels to an upset over Gonzaga in the 2019 WCC championship and NCAA tournament appearance, where they fell to Villanova. He was named to the First Team All-WCC.

Coming into his senior season, Ford was named to the Naismith and Wooden Award watchlists. In his senior season opener, he scored 26 points and hit 4-of-8 three-pointers as Saint Mary's defeated Wisconsin 65–63 in overtime. At the conclusion of the regular season, Ford was named to the First Team All-WCC. On March 7, 2020, Ford scored a career-high 42 points in a 89–82 double-overtime win over Pepperdine in the 2020 WCC tournament quarterfinal. He scored 18 points in the WCC tournament semifinal versus BYU and hit a jump shot with 1.4 seconds remaining to give the Gaels a 51–50 win. Ford averaged 21.9 points per game on a team that finished 26–8.

== Professional career ==
=== Agua Caliente Clippers (2021) ===
After going undrafted in the 2020 NBA draft, Ford signed an Exhibit 10 contract with the Los Angeles Clippers. He was waived by the Clippers on December 14.

On February 4, 2021, Ford was included in the roster of the Agua Caliente Clippers.

=== Peristeri (2021) ===
On March 24, 2021, Ford signed with Greek club Peristeri for the rest of the 2020–21 season.

=== Return to Agua Caliente (2021–2022) ===
On September 24, 2021, Ford signed with the Los Angeles Clippers and was waived the same day. On October 27, Ford re-signed with the Agua Caliente Clippers.

=== Stockton / Sacramento Kings (2022–2024) ===
On November 3, 2022, Ford was named to the opening night roster for the Stockton Kings.

On September 12, 2023, Ford signed with the Sacramento Kings and, three days later, his deal was converted to a two-way contract.

=== Aquila Trento (2024–2025) ===
On July 26, 2024, Ford signed with Dolomiti Energia Trento of the Lega Basket Serie A.

On October 14, 2024, Ford received the Hoops Agents Player of the Week award for Round 3. He had the game-high 24 points and 4 rebounds for his team's win.

=== Trapani Shark (2025) ===
On June 24, 2025, Ford signed with Trapani Shark of the Lega Basket Serie A.

=== Bahçeşehir Koleji (2026) ===
On January 2, 2026, Ford signed with Bahçeşehir Koleji of the Basketbol Süper Ligi (BSL) and the EuroCup.

=== Alba Berlin (2026–present) ===
On June 30, 2026, Ford signed with Alba Berlin of the Basketball Bundesliga (BBL).

== Career statistics ==
Legend
GP	Games played	GS	Games started	MPG	Minutes per game
FG%	Field goal percentage	3P%	3-point field goal percentage	FT%	Free throw percentage
RPG	Rebounds per game	APG	Assists per game	SPG	Steals per game
BPG	Blocks per game	PPG	Points per game	**Bold**	Career high

=== NBA ===
==== Regular season ====
Year	Team	GP	GS	MPG	FG%	3P%	FT%	RPG	APG	SPG	BPG	PPG
2023–24	Sacramento	6	0	3.6	.571	.667	1.000	.3	.3	.0	.0	2.0
Career		6	0	3.6	.571	.667	1.000	.3	.3	.0	.0	2.0

=== College ===
Year	Team	GP	GS	MPG	FG%	3P%	FT%	RPG	APG	SPG	BPG	PPG
2016–17	Saint Mary's	29	0	5.8	.389	.357	.818	.6	.7	.1	.0	2.4
2017–18	Saint Mary's	**36**	**36**	27.4	**.508**	**.443**	.754	2.7	1.6	.9	**.1**	11.1
2018–19	Saint Mary's	34	34	36.9	.489	.412	.800	2.8	**2.5**	1.3	.0	21.1
2019–20	Saint Mary's	34	34	**38.0**	.492	.411	**.836**	**3.0**	2.3	**1.4**	.0	**21.9**
Career		133	104	27.8	.490	.416	.806	2.3	1.8	.9	.0	14.5
