= Yoeli Childs =

American basketball player (born 1998)

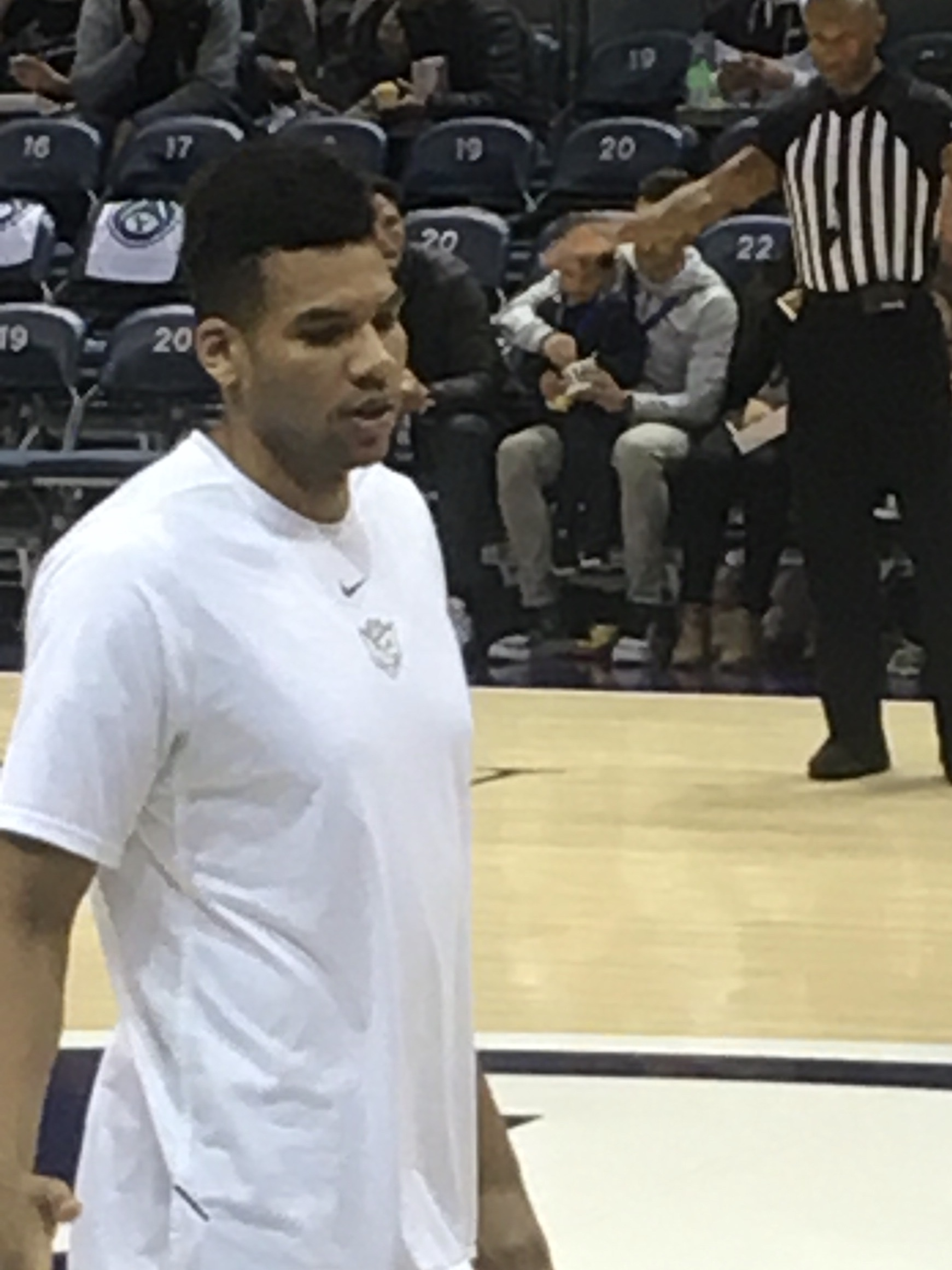
- Childs in 2019

No. 23 – Kobe Storks
- Position: Power forward
- League: B.League

Personal information
- Born: January 13, 1998 (age 28)
- Listed height: 6 ft 8 in (2.03 m)
- Listed weight: 225 lb (102 kg)

Career information
- High school: Bingham (South Jordan, Utah)
- College: BYU (2016–2020)
- NBA draft: 2020: undrafted
- Playing career: 2021–present

Career history
- 2021: Erie BayHawks
- 2021: MHP Riesen Ludwigsburg
- 2022: Salt Lake City Stars
- 2022–2023: Hamburg Towers
- 2023–2025: Saga Ballooners
- 2025–present: Kobe Storks

Career highlights
- 3× First-team All-WCC (2018–2020); WCC All-Freshman team (2017)
- Stats at NBA.com
- Stats at Basketball Reference

Yoeli Bingan Childs (born January 13, 1998) is an American professional basketball player for the Kobe Storks of the Japanese B.League. He played college basketball for the BYU Cougars.

== High school career ==
Childs played at Bingham High School, a class 6A high school, in South Jordan, Utah. During his sophomore year, the 2013–14 season, he averaged 11.1 points per game and 5.3 rebounds per game as Bingham advanced to the state quarterfinals. During his junior year, the 2014–15 season, he improved his average points per game to 16.4 and his average rebounds per game to 10.7 when Bingham again reached the state quarterfinals. In the 2015–16 season, Childs, now a senior, averaged 18.5 points per game while he maintained an average of 10.7 rebounds per game and Bingham High School won the state championship.

=== Recruiting ===
In the 2016 recruiting class, Childs was ranked by ESPN at 53rd in their Top 100, 2nd in the state of Utah, 6th in the region and 13th among Power Forwards. As a consensus four-star recruit, Childs received athletic scholarship offers from Arizona State University, Auburn, Boise State, Brigham Young University, Idaho State University, Utah State University, Vanderbilt and Wyoming, but committed with Brigham Young University on September 12, 2015.

College recruiting
Name	Hometown	School	Height	Weight	Commit date
Yoeli Childs; PF	South Jordan, UT	Bingham (UT)	6 ft 7 in (2.01 m)	230 lb (100 kg)	Sep 12, 2015
Yoeli Childs; PF	Recruit ratings: Rivals: 247Sports: ESPN: (85)				
Overall recruit ranking: Rivals: 71 247Sports: 153 ESPN: 53
Note: In many cases, Scout, Rivals, 247Sports, On3, and ESPN may conflict in their listings of height and weight.; In these cases, the average was taken. ESPN grades are on a 100-point scale.; Sources: "BYU 2016 Basketball Commitments". Rivals.; "2016 BYU Cougars Recruiting Class". ESPN.; "2016 Team Ranking". Rivals.

== College career ==
=== Freshman year ===
Childs had an immediate impact with the Cougars as a true freshman during the 2016–17 season. He played in 33 of the team's 34 games, starting in 26 of those games. He averaged nearly 26 minutes per game, scoring 9.3 points per game and getting 8.2 rebounds per game. He was selected to the All-West Coast Conference Freshman Team alongside teammate T. J. Haws.

=== Sophomore year ===
During the 2017–18 season, in his second year with BYU, Childs' numbers improved dramatically. His points per game increased to 17.8 and his free throw and 3-point percentages increased to .643 and .313, respectively. Childs was selected in January 2018 as a WCC Player of the Week. At the close of the season, he and teammate Elijah Bryant were named to the All-West Coast Conference First Team.

=== Junior year ===
Prior to the start of the 2018–19 season, Childs decided to enter his name in the NBA draft pool. While he did not hire an agent, in order to possibly return to BYU for another year, many believed that he would not return to play for BYU for his junior season. After receiving what Childs called "valuable feedback," he did decide to play at BYU for his junior year. Childs was named to the Karl Malone Power Forward of the Year award preseason watch list and was later named as one of the 10 finalists. During the year, his name was included on the Lute Olson Player of the Year and the Lou Henson Mid-Major Player of the Year awards. In December and again in January, Childs was named a WCC Player of the Week. Childs finished the year first in the WCC in scoring at 21.2 points per game and first in rebounding at 9.7 per game.

=== Senior year ===
After the close of his junior year, Childs again decided to enter his name into the NBA draft pool, this time hiring an agent. He unexpectedly decided to return to BYU for his final season saying, "I'm coming back for my senior year. Let’s make some magic happen." For the second straight season, Childs was named to the watch lists for the preseason Karl Malone Power Forward of the Year Award as well as the Lou Henson Mid-Major Player of the Year Award. He was also listed as a preseason candidate for the Naismith Trophy, the Wooden Award and the Julius Erving Award. Due to paperwork errors as part of the NBA draft exploration process, Childs did not participate in the first 9 games of the season. On February 22, 2020, Childs scored 28 points and had 10 rebounds in a 91–78 upset of second-ranked Gonzaga.

On February 29, 2020, Childs scored 38 points and grabbed 14 rebounds in an 81–64 win over Pepperdine. This put him over 2,000 points for his career and made him the first player in school history to score 2,000 points and collect 1,000 rebounds. At the conclusion of the regular season, Childs was named to the First Team All-West Coast Conference.

== Professional career ==
After going undrafted in the 2020 NBA draft, Childs signed an exhibit 10 contract with the Washington Wizards. He was waived on December 18, 2020. He was then added to the roster of the Wizards' NBA G League affiliate, the Capital City Go-Go. He was assigned to the Erie BayHawks as a flex player when the Go-Go declined to play the NBA G League restart in Orlando, Florida. He averaged 8.9 points and 4.8 rebounds in 12 games with Erie.

After joining the Los Angeles Lakers for the 2021 NBA Summer League, Childs signed with MHP Riesen Ludwigsburg of the easyCredit BBL on September 11. In three games, he averaged 7.6 points and 7.6 rebounds per game. Childs parted ways with the team on December 5, after sustaining a knee injury.

=== Salt Lake City Stars (2022) ===
On January 13, 2022, Childs was traded from the Capital City Go-Go to the Salt Lake City Stars.

=== Hamburg Towers (2022–present) ===
On June 24, 2022, Childs signed with Hamburg Towers of the German Basketball Bundesliga.

== Career statistics ==
Legend
GP	Games played	GS	Games started	MPG	Minutes per game
FG%	Field goal percentage	3P%	3-point field goal percentage	FT%	Free throw percentage
RPG	Rebounds per game	APG	Assists per game	SPG	Steals per game
BPG	Blocks per game	PPG	Points per game	**Bold**	Career high

=== College ===
Year	Team	GP	GS	MPG	FG%	3P%	FT%	RPG	APG	SPG	BPG	PPG
2016–17	BYU	33	26	25.9	.550	.000	.585	8.2	1.2	.6	1.4	9.3
2017–18	BYU	**35**	**34**	**34.0**	.541	.313	.643	8.6	**2.2**	.9	**1.8**	17.8
2018–19	BYU	32	32	33.3	.507	.323	**.708**	**9.7**	2.1	**1.0**	1.0	21.2
2019–20	BYU	19	19	28.8	**.574**	**.489**	.538	9.0	2.0	.7	.9	**22.2**
Career		119	111	30.7	.537	.356	.636	8.8	1.9	.8	1.3	17.1

== Personal life ==
Childs is the son of Kara Childs and has one brother. He is a member of the Church of Jesus Christ of Latter-day Saints. He was baptized in the church in July 2016 at the age of 18. He was married on August 3, 2018, to the former Megan Boudreaux who was a member of the Utah Valley University volleyball team.

== See also ==
- List of NCAA Division I men's basketball players with 2000 points and 1000 rebounds
