= Zac Seljaas =

American basketball player (born 1997)

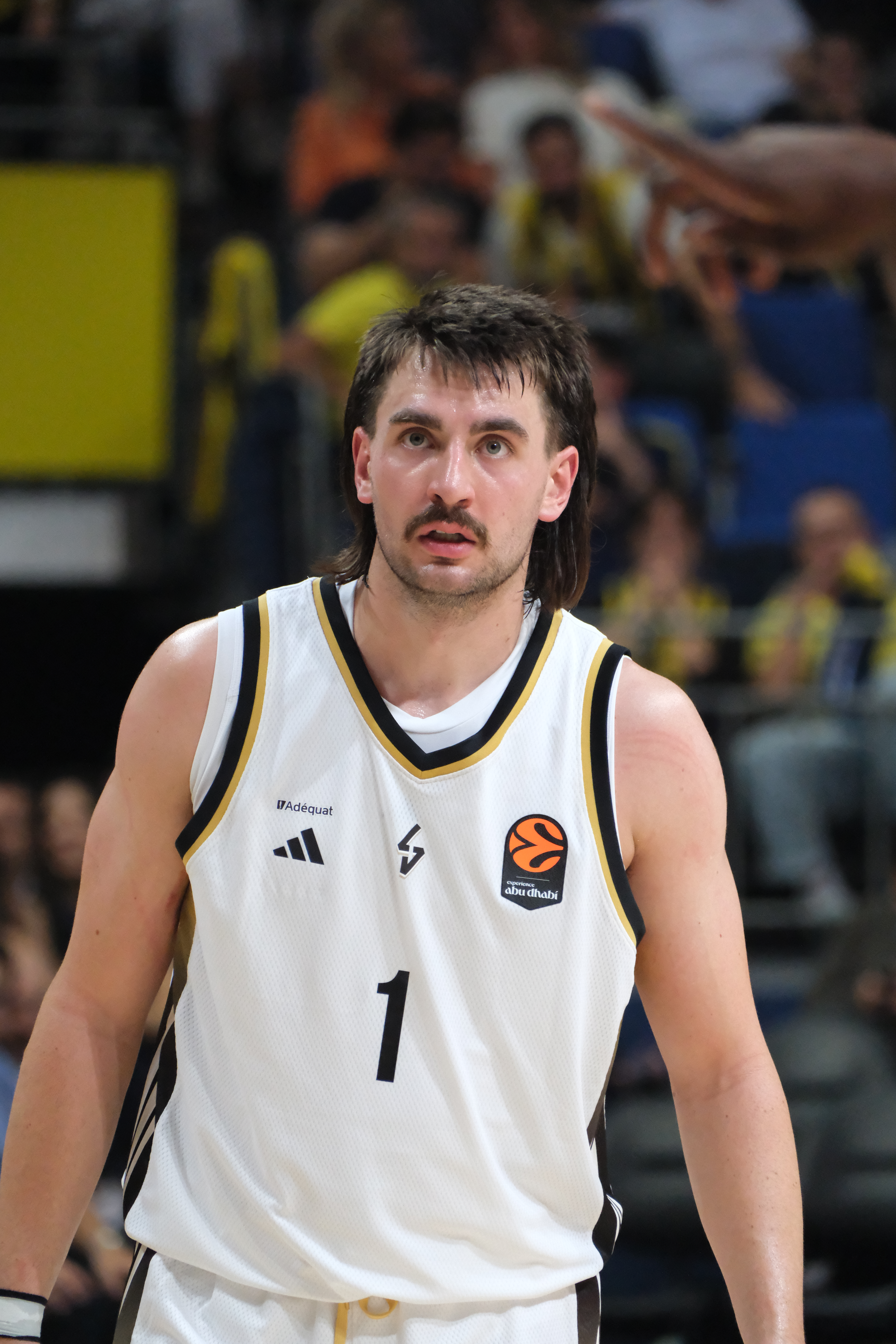
- Seljaas with ASVEL in 2025

No. 1 – Napoli Basket
- Position: Power forward
- League: LBA; EuroCup

Personal information
- Born: July 11, 1997 (age 29) Bountiful, Utah, U.S.
- Listed height: 2.00 m (6 ft 7 in)
- Listed weight: 100 kg (220 lb)

Career information
- High school: Bountiful (Bountiful, Utah)
- College: BYU (2015–2020)
- NBA draft: 2019: undrafted
- Playing career: 2020–present

Career history
- 2020–2021: Prievidza
- 2021–2022: Vera Tbilisi
- 2022–2023: Tigers Tübingen
- 2023–2025: Würzburg
- 2025–2026: ASVEL
- 2026–present: Napoli

Career highlights
- All-Bundesliga First Team (2025); All-Bundesliga Second Team (2024)

Zachary Todd Seljaas (born July 11, 1997) is an American professional basketball player for Napoli of the Italian Lega Basket Serie A (LBA) and the EuroCup. He played college basketball for the BYU Cougars. Standing at a height of 2.00 m (6 ft 6 1/2 in), Seljaas plays at the power forward position.

== Early life and high school career ==
Zeljaas was born in Bountiful, Utah. Born in a family with a basketball background, he started playing for his hometown high school, Bountiful High School. Over four years, he scored 1,704 points and earned several individual awards, including the 'Utah Player of the Year Award' in 2015.

== College career ==
Seljaas spent his entire college career with BYU, appearing in 134 games over four seasons. Averaging 6.6 points per game, he became the program's 8th highest 3-point shooter while averaging a 39.5 percentage. He paused his career in 2016 to server on a mission for the LDS Church in Iowa. Seljaas shared the locker room with fellow EuroLeague player Elijah Bryant while at BYU.

== Professional career ==
After finishing his college basketball career, Seljaas signed for BC Prievidza of the Slovak Basketball League in September 2020. However, he would only play 5 games in Slovakia due to an injury, averaging 13.4 points per game. Seljaas went on the play for BC Vera Tbilisi in the Georgian Superliga in the 2020–21 season, averaging 22.1 points per game. In 2022, he signed with Tigers Tübingen of the ProA, the second tier of German basketball.

=== Würzburg Baskets (2023–2025) ===
After helping Tübingen reach promotion, Seljaas signed for Würzburg Baskets of the Basketball Bundesliga in the summer of 2023. His contract was extended for a second season in April 2024. Becoming a key player and team captain in his second season with the Germans, Würzburg announced his departure at the end of the 2024-25 season.

=== ASVEL (2025–2026) ===
On July 17, 2025, LDLC ASVEL of the French LNB Élite and the EuroLeague announced Seljaas as a new player, signing a one year deal. On June 16, 2026, ASVEL announced Seljaas' departure following the expiration of his contract.

=== Napoli Basket (2026–present) ===
On June 23, 2026, Seljaas signed with Napoli of the Italian Lega Basket Serie A (LBA).

== Career statistics ==
Legend
GP	Games played	GS	Games started	MPG	Minutes per game
FG%	Field goal percentage	3P%	3-point field goal percentage	FT%	Free throw percentage
RPG	Rebounds per game	APG	Assists per game	SPG	Steals per game
BPG	Blocks per game	PPG	Points per game	**Bold**	Career high

=== Domestic leagues ===
Year	Team	League	GP	MPG	FG%	3P%	FT%	RPG	APG	SPG	BPG	PPG
2023–24	(Germany) Würzburg	BBL	28	28.2	.517	.442	.835	6.0	1.1	1.1	.6	13.4
2024–25	(Germany) Würzburg	BBL	27	30.7	.433	.376	.809	5.5	1.7	1.8	.2	13.4

=== College ===
Year	Team	GP	GS	MPG	FG%	3P%	FT%	RPG	APG	SPG	BPG	PPG
2015–16	BYU	**35**	1	20.0	**.494**	**.500**	.697	2.9	**1.6**	.6	**.5**	**7.6**
2017–18	BYU	**35**	11	19.9	.455	.295	**.828**	1.8	1.4	.4	.3	5.1
2018–19	BYU	32	**14**	**22.6**	.424	.373	.767	3.5	1.3	.7	.4	7.1
2019–20	BYU	32	0	19.9	.422	.256	.765	**4.0**	.8	**.8**	.3	6.6
Career		134	26	20.6	.449	.395	.763	3.0	1.2	.6	.3	6.6
