= Dave Miller (broadcaster) =

American broadcaster

David Miller is a former studio analyst for Time Warner Cable SportsNet. He has also served as a color commentator for Sparks games. He previously served as an assistant coach for the men's basketball program at Arizona State University, Texas, Eastern Kentucky and USC. Along with his collegiate experience, he has served as an assistant coach in the NBA, having been on former Lakers head coach Byron Scott's staff when Scott was the head coach of the New Orleans Hornets. One of his signature slogans while breaking down a team is "Know Your Personnel", which he says when referencing a team being aware of its opponent's style of play.

== Personal ==
Miller was born in Allentown, Pennsylvania. He graduated from Allen High School in 1981. Miller has two sons, David III and Mike and a daughter named Samantha. His son, Dave Miller Jr., is an assistant basketball coach at University of Texas. Miller holds a master's degree in Sports Administration that he obtained from Eastern Kentucky University.
