= Bingham High School =

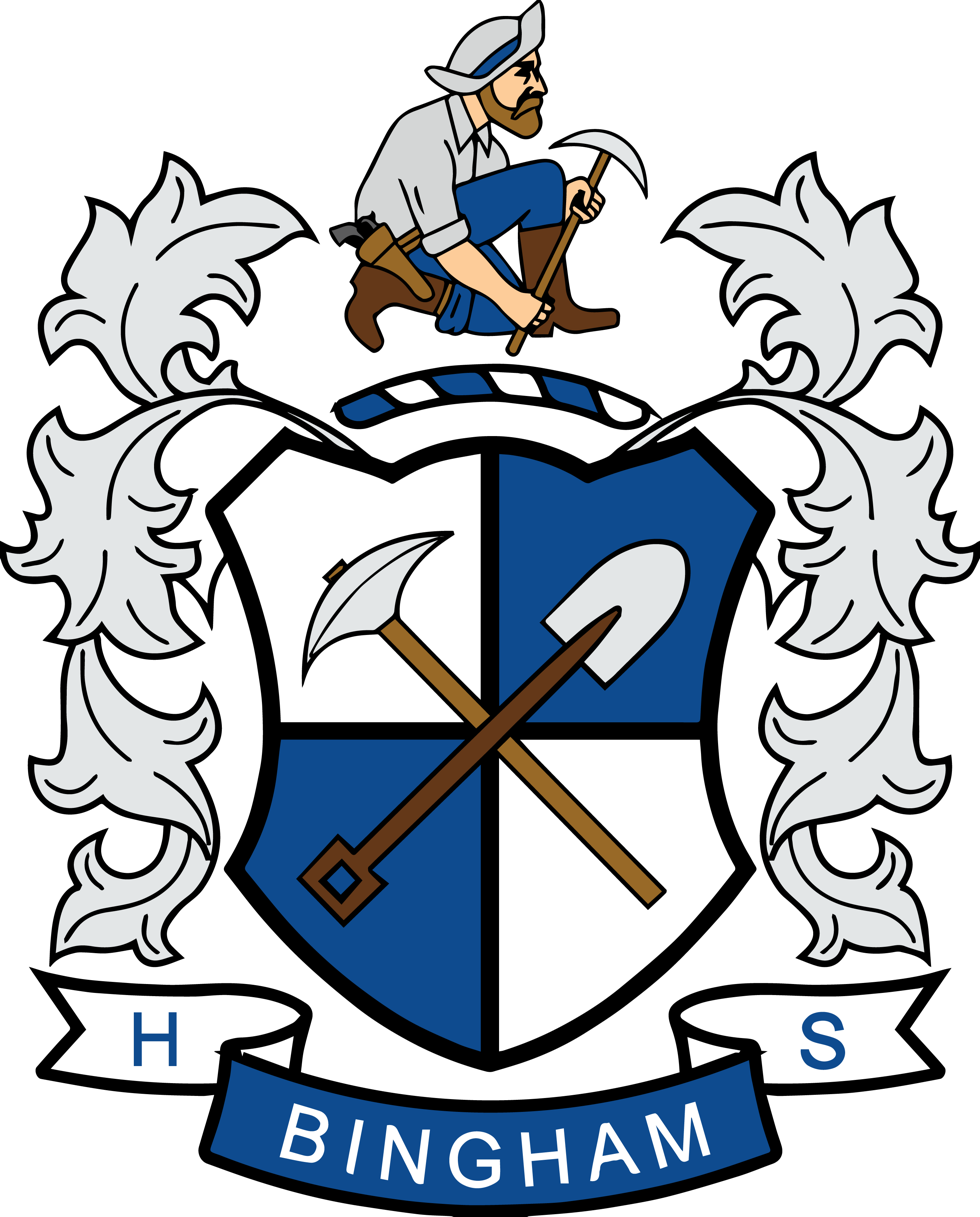

Location
- 2160 W. 10400 S. South Jordan, Utah 84095; United States; 40°33′50″N 111°56′50″W

Information
- Type: Public
- Established: September 9, 1908
- School district: Jordan School District
- Principal: Shawn Mcleod
- Teaching staff: 99.38 (FTE)
- Grades: 10–12
- Enrollment: 2,471 (2023–2024)
- Student to teacher ratio: 24.86
- Colors: Royal blue and white
- Mascot: Miner
- Newspaper: The Prospector
- Website: Official website

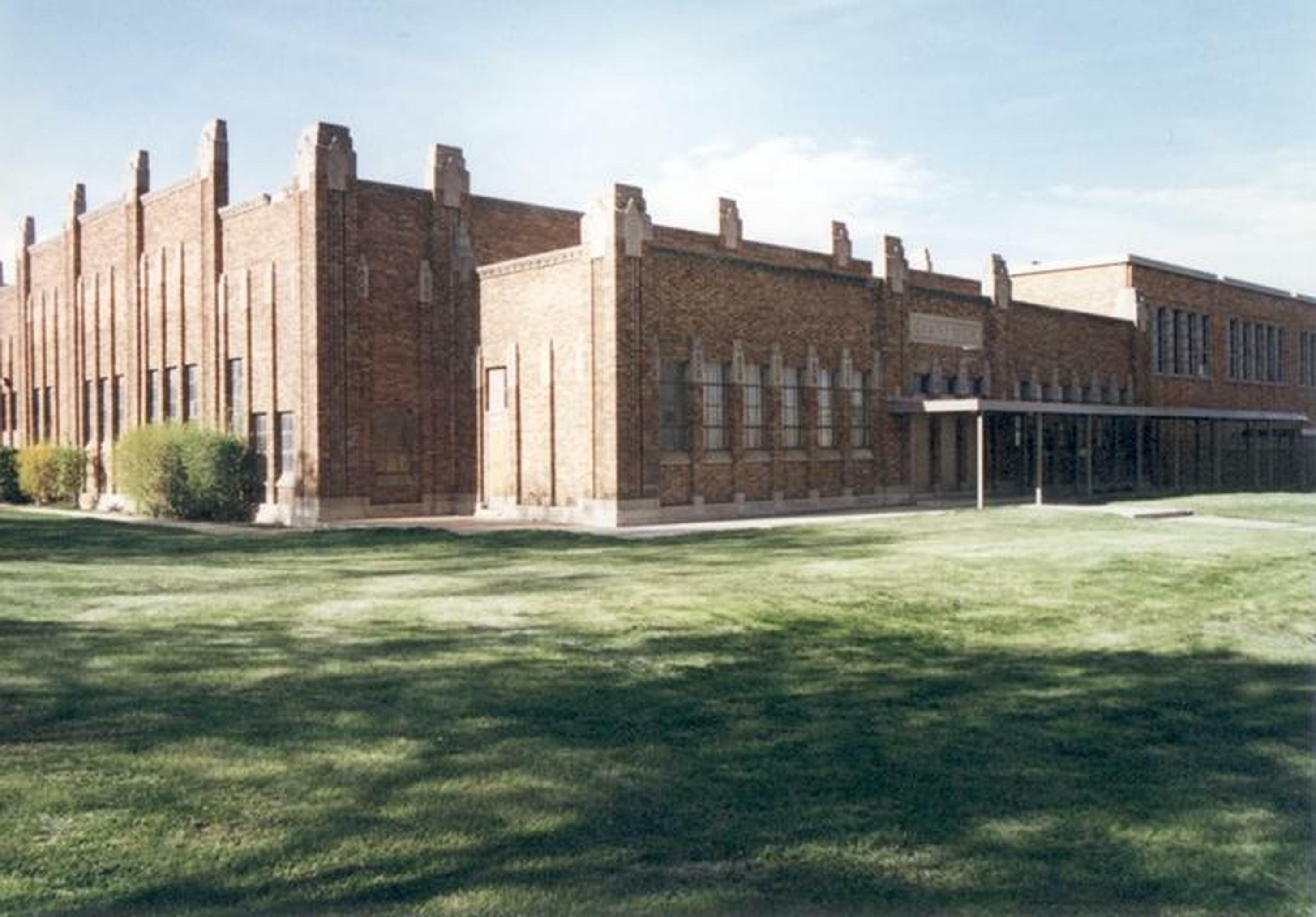
Old Bingham High School in Copperton before it was closed in 1975

Bingham High School is a public high school located in South Jordan, Utah, United States. It is one of eight high schools in the Jordan School District. Teacher/pupil ratios are budgeted at 1 to 27.3, with actual class sizes varying. The school's name and mascot are derived from its proximity to the Bingham Copper Mine.

== History ==
Established in 1908, Bingham is one of the oldest schools in the state of Utah. Since that first year in the City of Bingham's Canyon Hall, Bingham High has had five locations: three in Bingham Canyon (1908-1931), one in Copperton (1931-1975) and the current location in South Jordan (1975-). In 1975, the high school was moved to a new building in South Jordan that is still being used today. The former school was converted into a junior high and operated until 2002 when it was closed and demolished.

In 2013, over 2,000 Bingham students and faculty participated in a yearbook video that went viral on YouTube.

In 2014, the principal at the time was criticized for slut-shaming students, nearly two dozen of whom he barred from entry to a school dance for showing too much skin. 80 students ended up walking out of the event in protest.

In 2021, the school started a five-year $37.9 million renovation. Delays from the project forced students to temporarily participate virtually.

In 2022, a wrestling coach from the high school was charged with sexual abuse of a minor for assaulting a female student in an equipment room.

== School athletics ==
Bingham received the Deseret News All-Sports Award in 2009 and 2011 for having the highest finishes in boys' and girls' sports of any 5A school in the state of Utah. Bingham High School's athletics department includes the following sports:

- Baseball - Since baseball came to Bingham in 1925, Miner teams have established a dynasty of state champions. Miner base ballers have taken the state title 22 times (1932, 1933, 1934, 1935, 1939, 1940, 1942, 1947, 1950, 1952, 1954, 1955, 1974, 1975, 1976, 1984, 1985, 1999, 2003, 2011, 2013 and 2018), more than any other school in Utah.
- Basketball - Basketball began during the 1915–1916 school year with the completion of the school's first gymnasium in November 1915. Basketball teams have since won ten state championships (in 1960, 1973, 1974, 1977, 1978, 1989, 1990, 2006, 2016, 2017) under coaches Udell Wankier, George Sluga, Mark Dubach, and Jake Schroeder.
- Competitive cheerleading
- Cross country - Bingham High Men's Cross Country team won the National Championship in 1995, becoming the first team to win a national championship for Bingham and the first men's high school team of any sport to win a national championship in the state of Utah. The Harriers also have four state championships to their credit (1990, 1995, 1996, and 2003). Lady Miners won state championships in cross country in 1998, 1999, and 2000. The girls’ cross country team also won Bingham's second national championship in 1999.
- Football - Bingham Miners Football program have won 11 state championships in the years 1939, 1941, 1945, 1946, 2006, 2009, 2010, 2013, 2014, 2016, and 2017. It is a common trend for Bingham footballer players to go on to play at Brigham Young University, with Bleacher Report calling it the "Bingham to BYU pipeline".
- Golf
- Ice hockey
- Marching band - The Bingham Marching "Miner" Band has won 2 State Championships in the 4A division: 2016 and 2017
- Minerette drill team - Bingham Minerettes have won 11 State Championships: 2004, 2005, 2006, 2007, 2010, 2011, 2012, 2020, 2021, 2022, 2023.
- Soccer
- Softball
- Swimming
- Tennis
- Track and field
- Volleyball
- Wrestling

== Notable alumni ==
- Jaime Bergman, model and actress
- Francis Bernard, NFL player
- Branden Carlson, NBA player
- Dalton Schultz, NFL player
- Rebecca Chavez-Houck, member of the Utah House of Representatives
- Yoeli Childs, basketball player
- Kevin Curtis, NFL player
- Isaiah Glasker, college football player
- Bruce Hardy, NFL player
- Harvey Langi, NFL player
- Star Lotulelei, NFL player
- Dax Milne, NFL player
- Paul Peterson, former college football player, coach
- Ivy Baker Priest, United States Treasurer under Dwight D. Eisenhower
- Fred Roberts, NBA player
- Junior Tafuna, NFL player
- Elmer Ward, NFL player
- Gary Wilkinson, NBA player
