= BYU–Gonzaga men's basketball rivalry =

American college basketball rivalry

- BYU Cougars Gonzaga Bulldogs
- Sport: Basketball
- First meeting: December 16, 1949; Gonzaga, 46–41
- Latest meeting: February 11, 2023; Gonzaga, 88–81

Statistics
- Total meetings: 32
- All-time series: Gonzaga leads, 25–7
- Largest victory: Gonzaga, 102–68 (2019)
- Longest win streak: Gonzaga, 7 (2021–present)
- Current win streak: Gonzaga, 7 (2021–present)

Locations of BYU and Gonzaga

The BYU–Gonzaga men's basketball rivalry is a college basketball rivalry between the Gonzaga Bulldogs team of Gonzaga University in Spokane, Washington and the BYU Cougars team of Brigham Young University in Provo, Utah. BYU has played Gonzaga in the West Coast Conference tournament final in 2014, 2015, 2018, and 2021 with Gonzaga winning all four of these matchups. Gonzaga leads the overall series 25–7, with the most recent meeting on February 11, 2023. On September 10, 2021, the Big 12 Conference unanimously accepted BYU's application to the conference, joining for the 2023–24 season and leaving the future of the series in doubt.

== Series overview ==
=== First meetings ===
BYU and Gonzaga first played on December 16, 1949, at a neutral court holiday tournament in California. The two teams would not meet again until March 19, 2011, in the third round of the NCAA tournament, as a BYU team led by National Player of the Year Jimmer Fredette advanced to the Sweet Sixteen. Fredette scored 34 points and the Cougars defeated the Zags 89–67, the largest BYU win in the series to this day. The following season, BYU left the Mountain West Conference and joined the West Coast Conference for the 2011–2012 season.

=== Conference foes ===
Since the Cougars joined the WCC, Gonzaga has compiled a 24–6 record against BYU. However, BYU is one of few teams to win multiple times at the McCarthey Athletic Center in Spokane over the last decade, with three consecutive wins at the Kennel in 2015, 2016 and 2017 (the first two were later vacated by the NCAA due to a scandal involving BYU guard Nick Emery). BYU was the only team to beat #1 ranked Gonzaga during the 2016–17 regular season in which Gonzaga earned its first trip to the Final Four and National Championship game. The Cougars triumphed 79–71 over the 29–0 Zags, overcoming an 18–2 deficit in the game's opening minutes and a 12-point second half hole. BYU's Eric Mika led the way with 29 points and 11 rebounds to hand undefeated Gonzaga its lone loss of the regular season on senior night.

In 2020, on Senior Night at the Marriott Center, No. 23 BYU knocked off No. 2 Gonzaga 91–78 in front of a sellout crowd. As the final buzzer sounded, delirious fans rushed the court for a jubilant celebration — just weeks before the NCAA Tournament was canceled due to the COVID-19 pandemic. That was the most recent Cougar win over the Bulldogs.

In the final WCC campaign for BYU, Julian Strawther etched his name into the rivalry's lore when he knocked down the game-winning 3-pointer in the Zags’ 75–74 win in Provo. Gonzaga won the return game 88–81 in Spokane, finishing 9–3 at the Kennel against the Cougars. Those three losses were the most inflicted by a WCC opponent since BYU joined in 2012; fellow WCC powerhouse Saint Mary's is 2–9 and all other conference programs are 1–75 on the road against the Zags during this period. This is the last scheduled regular season meeting, as BYU prepares to move to the Big 12 Conference next season. Both programs and their respective head coaches have expressed interest in continuing the rivalry in non-conference play; Gonzaga star Drew Timme emphasized the importance of the series: “I think it’s a special rivalry. And one that should continue even past them leaving the conference,” he said. “I think it’s something that we should do home-and-homes forever. … I feel like it’s developed into such a great rivalry.”.

== Rival Accomplishments ==
The following summarizes the accomplishments of the two programs.

Team	BYU Cougars	Gonzaga Bulldogs
NCAA National Titles	0	0
NCAA Final Four Appearances	0	2
NCAA Tournament Appearances	30	24
NCAA Tournament Record	15–33	41–24
Conference Tournament Titles	3	3
Conference Championships	27	27
Consensus First Team All-Americans	3	5
Naismith Players of the Year	1	0
All-time Program Record	1,897–1,129	1,742–1,119
All-time Winning Percentage	.627	.609

== Game results ==
Below is a complete list of series results. Rankings are from the AP Poll at the time of the game.

BYU victories	Gonzaga victories	Tie games

No.	Date	Location	Winner	Score
1	1949	California	Gonzaga	46–41
2	2011	Denver	#10 BYU	89–67
3	2012	Provo	BYU	83–73
4	2012	Spokane	Gonzaga	74–63
5	2012	Paradise	Gonzaga	77–58
6	2013	Spokane	#10 Gonzaga	83–63
7	2013	Provo	#2 Gonzaga	70–65
8	2014	Spokane	Gonzaga	84–69
9	2014	Provo	BYU	73–65
10	2014	Paradise	Gonzaga	75–64
11	2014	Provo	#8 Gonzaga	87–80
12	2015	Spokane	BYU	73–70
13	2015	Paradise	#7 Gonzaga	91–75
14	2016	Spokane	BYU	69–68
15	2016	Provo	Gonzaga	71–68
16	2016	Paradise	Gonzaga	88–84
17	2017	Provo	#1 Gonzaga	85–75

No.	Date	Location	Winner	Score
18	2017	Spokane	BYU	79–71
19	2018	Spokane	#14 Gonzaga	68–60
20	2018	Provo	#6 Gonzaga	79–65
21	2018	Paradise	#6 Gonzaga	74–54
22	2019	Provo	#4 Gonzaga	93–63
23	2019	Spokane	#2 Gonzaga	102–68
24	2020	Spokane	#1 Gonzaga	92–69
25	2020	Provo	#23 BYU	91–78
26	2021	Spokane	#1 Gonzaga	86–69
27	2021	Provo	#1 Gonzaga	82–71
28	2021	Paradise	#1 Gonzaga	88–78
29	2022	Spokane	#2 Gonzaga	110–84
30	2022	Provo	#2 Gonzaga	90–57
31	2023	Provo	#8 Gonzaga	75–74
32	2023	Spokane	#12 Gonzaga	88–81
Series: Gonzaga leads 25–7
