= 2016–17 Santa Clara Broncos men's basketball team =

American college basketball season

2016–17 Santa Clara Broncos men's basketball
- Conference: West Coast Conference
- Record: 17–16 (10–8 WCC)
- Head coach: Herb Sendek (1st season)
- Assistant coaches: Barret Peery; Julius Hodge; Jason Ludwig
- Home arena: Leavey Center

2016–17 West Coast Conference men's basketball standings
	Conf.				Overall
Team	W		L	PCT	W		L	PCT
No. 2 Gonzaga †	17	–	1	.944	37	–	2	.949
No. 22 Saint Mary's	16	–	2	.889	29	–	5	.853
BYU	12	–	6	.667	22	–	12	.647
San Francisco	10	–	8	.556	20	–	13	.606
Santa Clara	10	–	8	.556	17	–	16	.515
Loyola Marymount	8	–	10	.444	15	–	15	.500
San Diego	6	–	12	.333	13	–	18	.419
Pepperdine	5	–	13	.278	9	–	22	.290
Pacific	4	–	14	.222	11	–	22	.333
Portland	2	–	16	.111	11	–	22	.333
† Conference tournament winner Rankings from AP poll

The 2016–17 Santa Clara Broncos men's basketball team represented Santa Clara University during the 2016–17 NCAA Division I men's basketball season. This was head coach Herb Sendek's first season at Santa Clara. The Broncos played their home games at the Leavey Center as members of the West Coast Conference. They finished the season 17–16, 10–8 in WCC play to finish in a tie for fourth place. They defeated San Francisco in the WCC tournament before losing in the semifinals to Gonzaga.

== Previous season ==
The Broncos finished the 2015–16 season 11–20, 7–11 in WCC play to finish in sixth place. They lost in the quarterfinals of the WCC tournament to BYU.

On March 7, 2016, head coach Kerry Keating was fired by Santa Clara. On March 29, the school hired Herb Sendek as head coach.

== Departures ==
Name	Number	Pos.	Height	Weight	Year	Hometown	Notes
Brendyn Taylor	5	G	6'3"	195	RS Junior	Los Angeles, CA	Graduate transferred
Bryson Lockley	13	G	6'7"	210	Freshman	Houston, TX	Transferred to Panola College
Werner Nistler	30	G	6'2"	170	Senior	Portland, OR	Graduated

=== Incoming transfers ===
Name	Number	Pos.	Height	Weight	Year	Hometown	Previous School
Akil Douglas	13	F	6'10"	190	Junior	San Jose, CA	Junior college transferred from San Jose City College

== Recruiting ==
College recruiting information
Name	Hometown	School	Height	Weight	Commit date
Julian Roche; C	Andover, NH	Proctor Academy	6 ft 11 in (2.11 m)	235 lb (107 kg)	
Julian Roche; C	Recruit ratings: Scout: Rivals: (56)				
Overall recruit ranking: Scout: nr Rivals: nr ESPN: nr
Note: In many cases, Scout, Rivals, 247Sports, On3, and ESPN may conflict in their listings of height and weight.; In these cases, the average was taken. ESPN grades are on a 100-point scale.; Sources: "Santa Clara 2016 Basketball Commitments". Rivals.; "2016 Santa Clara Basketball Commits". Scout.; "ESPN". ESPN.; "Scout.com Team Recruiting Rankings". Scout.; "2016 Team Ranking". Rivals.

== Roster ==
2016–17 Santa Clara Broncos men's basketball team
Players
Coaches

Pos.	#	Name	Height	Weight	Year	Previous school	Hometown
C	0	Julian Roche	6 ft 11 in (2.11 m)	245 lb (111 kg)	Fr	Proctor Academy	Saint John, NB
G	1	Evan Wardlow	6 ft 4 in (1.93 m)	185 lb (84 kg)	Jr	El Camino Real	Lake View Terrace, CA
G	2	K. J. Feagin	6 ft 1 in (1.85 m)	175 lb (79 kg)	So	Long Beach Poly	Long Beach, CA
F	3	Henrik Jädersten	6 ft 11 in (2.11 m)	235 lb (107 kg)	So	Solna Gymnasium	Stockholm, Sweden
G	4	Jarvis Pugh	6 ft 6 in (1.98 m)	210 lb (95 kg)	RS Jr	Plano East	Murphy, TX
G	10	Kai Healy	6 ft 5 in (1.96 m)	205 lb (93 kg)	Jr	The Scots College in Bellevue Hills	Wahroonga, Sydney, Australia
G	12	Matt Hauser	6 ft 2 in (1.88 m)	170 lb (77 kg)	So	Thousand Oaks	Thousand Oaks, CA
F	13	Akil Douglas	6 ft 10 in (2.08 m)	190 lb (86 kg)	Jr	Evergreen Valley; San Jose City College	San Jose, CA
G	14	Evan Crawford	6 ft 3 in (1.91 m)	200 lb (91 kg)	So	St. Francis	Altadena, CA
G	15	Johnny Swayer (W)	6 ft 2 in (1.88 m)	180 lb (82 kg)	Fr	DeMartha	Hyattsville, MD
F	22	Matt Hubbard	6 ft 9 in (2.06 m)	230 lb (104 kg)	Jr	Colville	Colville, WA
G	23	Jared Brownridge	6 ft 3 in (1.91 m)	200 lb (91 kg)	Sr	Waubonsie Valley	Aurora, IL
F	35	Tony Lewis	6 ft 8 in (2.03 m)	260 lb (118 kg)	RS Fr	Central Catholic	San Antonio, TX
F	43	Nate Kratch	6 ft 6 in (1.98 m)	227 lb (103 kg)	RS Sr	Watertown-Mayer	Watertown, MN
C	50	Emmanuel Ndumanya	6 ft 9 in (2.06 m)	267 lb (121 kg)	RS Jr	Junípero Serra	Anambra, Nigeria

Head coach

- Herb Sendek (Carnegie Mellon)

Assistant coach(es)

- Barret Peery (Southern Utah)
- Julius Hodge (NC State)
- Jason Ludwig (UCLA)

Legend

- (C) Team captain
- (S) Suspended
- (I) Ineligible
- (W) Walk-on
- Injured
- Current redshirt

Roster

== Schedule and results ==
Date time, TV	Rank^{#}	Opponent^{#}	Result	Record	Site (attendance) city, state
Exhibition
11/05/2016*; 7:30 pm		Life Pacific	W 83–65		Leavey Center (1,558); Santa Clara, CA
Non-conference regular season
11/11/2016*; 7:00 pm		Northern Arizona; Cable Car Classic	W 67–64	1–0	Leavey Center (1,821); Santa Clara, CA
11/12/2016*; 6:00 pm		UC Davis; Cable Car Classic	L 58–63	1–1	Leavey Center (1,734); Santa Clara, CA
11/13/2016*; 2:30 pm		Tennessee State; Cable Car Classic	L 61–69	1–2	Leavey Center (1,102); Santa Clara, CA
11/19/2016*; 7:00 pm		Northern Colorado; Las Vegas Invitational	W 88–72	2–2	Leavey Center (1,331); Santa Clara, CA
11/21/2016*; 10:00 pm		Sacred Heart; Las Vegas Invitational	W 84–74	3–2	Leavey Center (1,112); Santa Clara, CA
11/24/2016*; 7:30 pm, FS1		vs. No. 8 Arizona; Las Vegas Invitational semifinals	L 61–69	3–3	Orleans Arena; Paradise, NV
11/25/2016*; 5:00 pm, FS1		vs. Vanderbilt; Las Vegas Invitational 3rd place game	L 66–76	3–4	Orleans Arena; Paradise, NV
11/30/2016*; 7:00 pm		UC Irvine	L 55–58	3–5	Leavey Center (1,082); Santa Clara, CA
12/03/2016*; 7:00 pm		at San Jose State	L 40–55	3–6	Event Center Arena; San Jose, CA
12/10/2016*; 2:00 pm		Cal State East Bay	W 75–50	4–6	Leavey Center; Santa Clara, CA
12/13/2016*; 7:00 pm		UC Riverside	W 77–53	5–6	Leavey Center; Santa Clara, CA
12/17/2016*; 1:00 pm, P12N		at Washington State	L 68–69	5–7	Beasley Coliseum (2,388); Pullman, WA
12/22/2016*; 5:00 pm		at Valparaiso	W 87–80 ^{2OT}	6–7	Athletics–Recreation Center (1,854); Valparaiso, IN
WCC regular season
12/29/2016; 6:00 pm, BYUtv		at BYU	L 59–89	6–8 (0–1)	Marriott Center (17,415); Provo, UT
12/31/2016; 3:00 pm, CSNBA		San Francisco	W 72–58	7–8 (1–1)	Leavey Center (1,389); Santa Clara, CA
01/05/2017; 7:00 pm		Portland	W 70–42	8–8 (2–1)	Leavey Center (1,404); Santa Clara, CA
01/07/2017; 3:00 pm, SPCSN		at Loyola Marymount	L 56–66	8–9 (2–2)	Gersten Pavilion (2,060); Los Angeles, CA
01/12/2017; 7:00 pm		at San Diego	W 59–57	9–9 (3–2)	Jenny Craig Pavilion (1,435); San Diego, CA
01/14/2017; 5:00 pm, SPCSN		at Pepperdine	W 75–61	10–9 (4–2)	Firestone Fieldhouse (1,053); Malibu, CA
01/19/2017; 8:00 pm, ESPNU		No. 4 Gonzaga	L 57–88	10–10 (4–3)	Leavey Center (4,738); Santa Clara, CA
01/21/2017; 1:00 pm, SPCSN		Loyola Marymount	W 64–63	11–10 (5–3)	Leavey Center (1,793); Santa Clara, CA
01/26/2017; 8:00 pm, ESPNU		BYU	W 76–68	12–10 (6–3)	Leavey Center (2,419); Santa Clara, CA
01/28/2017; 8:00 pm, CSNCA		No. 21 Saint Mary's	L 59–72	12–11 (6–4)	Leavey Center (2,707); Santa Clara, CA
02/02/2017; 7:00 pm, CSNCA+		at Portland	W 60–45	13–11 (7–4)	Chiles Center (1,706); Portland, OR
02/04/2017; 7:00 pm, ESPN2		at No. 1 Gonzaga	L 55–90	13–12 (7–5)	McCarthey Athletic Center (6,000); Spokane, WA
02/09/2017; 8:00 pm, CSNBA		at San Francisco	L 58–61	13–13 (7–6)	War Memorial Gymnasium (2,005); San Francisco, CA
02/11/2017; 7:00 pm		at Pacific	W 64–47	14–13 (8–6)	Alex G. Spanos Center (3,620); Stockton, CA
02/16/2017; 7:00 pm		Pepperdine	W 106–55	15–13 (9–6)	Leavey Center (1,216); Santa Clara, CA
02/18/2017; 7:00 pm		San Diego	L 58–60 ^{2OT}	15–14 (9–7)	Leavey Center (1,828); Santa Clara, CA
02/23/2017; 7:00 pm		Pacific	W 69–68	16–14 (10–7)	Leavey Center (1,792); Santa Clara, CA
02/25/2017; 7:00 pm		at No. 20 Saint Mary's	L 56–70	16–15 (10–8)	McKeon Pavilion (3,500); Moraga, CA
WCC tournament
03/04/2017; 3:00 pm, SPCSN	(4)	vs. (5) San Francisco; Quarterfinals	W 76–69	17–15	Orleans Arena (7,461); Paradise, NV
03/06/2017; 6:00 pm, ESPN	(4)	vs. (1) No. 4 Gonzaga; Semifinals	L 68–77	17–16	Orleans Arena (8,712); Paradise, NV
*Non-conference game. ^{#}Rankings from AP Poll. (#) Tournament seedings in parentheses. All times are in Pacific Time.
