= 2016–17 San Francisco Dons men's basketball team =

American college basketball season

2016–17 San Francisco Dons men's basketball
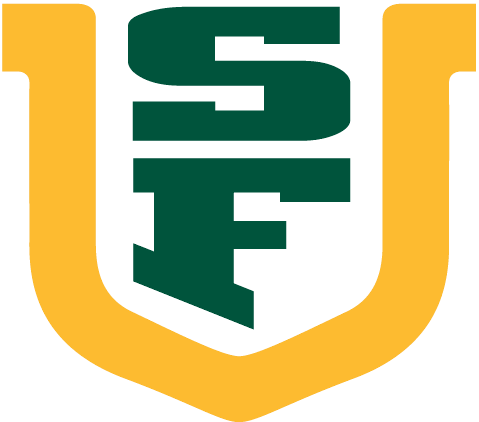

CBI, First Round
- Conference: West Coast Conference
- Record: 20–13 (10–8 WCC)
- Head coach: Kyle Smith (1st season)
- Associate head coach: Derrick Phelps; Todd Golden
- Assistant coach: Kevin Hovde
- Home arena: War Memorial Gymnasium

2016–17 West Coast Conference men's basketball standings
	Conf.				Overall
Team	W		L	PCT	W		L	PCT
No. 2 Gonzaga †	17	–	1	.944	37	–	2	.949
No. 22 Saint Mary's	16	–	2	.889	29	–	5	.853
BYU	12	–	6	.667	22	–	12	.647
San Francisco	10	–	8	.556	20	–	13	.606
Santa Clara	10	–	8	.556	17	–	16	.515
Loyola Marymount	8	–	10	.444	15	–	15	.500
San Diego	6	–	12	.333	13	–	18	.419
Pepperdine	5	–	13	.278	9	–	22	.290
Pacific	4	–	14	.222	11	–	22	.333
Portland	2	–	16	.111	11	–	22	.333
† Conference tournament winner Rankings from AP poll

The 2016–17 San Francisco Dons men's basketball team represented the University of San Francisco during the 2016–17 NCAA Division I men's basketball season. It was head coach Kyle Smith's first season at San Francisco. The Dons played their home games at the War Memorial Gymnasium as members of the West Coast Conference. They finished the season 20–13, 10–8 in WCC play to finish in a tie for fourth place. They lost in the quarterfinals of the WCC tournament to Santa Clara. They were invited to the College Basketball Invitational where they lost in the first round to Rice.

== Previous season ==
The Dons finished the 2015–16 season 15–15, 8–10 in WCC play to finish in fifth place. They lost in the quarterfinals of the WCC tournament to Pepperdine.

On March 9, 2016, head coach Rex Walters was fired. On March 30, the school hired Kyle Smith as head coach.

== Departures ==
Name	Number	Pos.	Height	Weight	Year	Hometown	Notes
Montray Clemsons	0	F	6'7"	235	Senior	Baltimore, MD	Graduated
Devin Watson	1	G	6'1"	165	Sophomore	Oceanside, CA	Transferred to San Diego State
Uche Ofoegbu	2	F	6'4"	214	RS Junior	San Antonio, TX	Transferred to UNLV
Cedric Wright	5	F	6'6"	210	Freshman	Fort Lauderdale, FL	Transferred to Chipola College
Stefan Cox	14	G	6'2"	180	Freshman	Sedalia, MO	Walk-on; didn't return
Stokley Chaffee	23	F	6'5"	200	Freshman	Pleasanton, CA	Walk-on; transferred to Las Positas College
Sean Grennan	30	G	6'3"	175	RS Senior	Sea Girt, NJ	Graduated
Tim Derksen	32	G	6'3"	202	Senior	Tucson, AZ	Graduated

== Recruiting Class of 2016 ==
College recruiting information
Name	Hometown	School	Height	Weight	Commit date
Jordan Ratinho #54 SG	Livermore, CA	De La Salle High School	6 ft 5 in (1.96 m)	175 lb (79 kg)	Sep 14, 2015
Jordan Ratinho #54 SG	Recruit ratings: Scout: Rivals: (75)				
Jimbo Lull #67 C	Palos Verdes, CA	New Hampton School	6 ft 10 in (2.08 m)	240 lb (110 kg)	Nov 11, 2015
Jimbo Lull #67 C	Recruit ratings: Scout: Rivals: (63)				
Sasha French; C	Napa, CA	The Hun School Of Princeton	6 ft 10 in (2.08 m)	215 lb (98 kg)	Jan 27, 2016
Sasha French; C	Recruit ratings: Scout: Rivals: (56)				
Charles Minlend; SG	Concord, NC	Fork Union Military Academy	6 ft 5 in (1.96 m)	205 lb (93 kg)	May 9, 2016
Charles Minlend; SG	Recruit ratings: Scout: Rivals: (0)				
Remu Raitanen; PF	Helsinki, Finland	Helsinki Basketball Academy	6 ft 9 in (2.06 m)	N/A	May 9, 2016
Remu Raitanen; PF	Recruit ratings: Scout: Rivals: (0)				
Chance Anderson; PF	Alpharetta, GA	St. Francis High School	6 ft 7 in (2.01 m)	210 lb (95 kg)	May 10, 2016
Chance Anderson; PF	Recruit ratings: Scout: Rivals: (0)				
Overall recruit ranking: Scout: nr Rivals: nr ESPN: nr
Note: In many cases, Scout, Rivals, 247Sports, On3, and ESPN may conflict in their listings of height and weight.; In these cases, the average was taken. ESPN grades are on a 100-point scale.; Sources: "San Francisco Dons 2016 Basketball Commitments". Rivals.; "2016 San Francisco Dons Basketball Commits". Scout.; "ESPN". ESPN.; "Scout.com Team Recruiting Rankings". Scout.; "2016 Team Ranking". Rivals.

== Roster ==
2016–17 San Francisco Dons men's basketball team
Players
Coaches

Pos.	#	Name	Height	Weight	Year	Previous school	Hometown
G	0	Maquill Smith	6 ft 4 in (1.93 m)	175 lb (79 kg)	So	Miami Christian	Miami, FL
G	2	Frankie Ferrari	5 ft 11 in (1.8 m)	179 lb (81 kg)	So	Burlingame	Burlingame, CA
G	3	Ronnie Boyce	6 ft 3 in (1.91 m)	158 lb (72 kg)	Sr	Putnam City; Connors College	Oklahoma City, OK
C	5	Jimbo Lull	7 ft 0 in (2.13 m)	252 lb (114 kg)	Fr	New Hampton School	Manhattan Beach, CA
F	10	Matt McCarthy	6 ft 9 in (2.06 m)	232 lb (105 kg)	So	Xavier College	Melbourne, Australia
F	11	Remu Raitanen	6 ft 9 in (2.06 m)	198 lb (90 kg)	Fr	Helsinki Basketball Academy	Helsinki, Finland
F	12	Chance Anderson	6 ft 7 in (2.01 m)	215 lb (98 kg)	Fr	St. Francis	Alpharetta, GA
G	14	Charles Minlend	6 ft 4 in (1.93 m)	208 lb (94 kg)	Fr	Fork Union Military Academy	Concord, NC
F	15	Nate Renfro	6 ft 7 in (2.01 m)	186 lb (84 kg)	So	Sahuaro	Tucson, AZ
F	22	Chase Foster	6 ft 5 in (1.96 m)	187 lb (85 kg)	Jr	Valor Christian	Highlands Ranch, CO
G	25	Jordan Ratinho	6 ft 5 in (1.96 m)	210 lb (95 kg)	Fr	De La Salle	Livermore, CA
G	30	Garrett Turner	5 ft 10 in (1.78 m)	151 lb (68 kg)	Fr	Boulder	Boulder, CO
C	33	Sasha French (W)	6 ft 11 in (2.11 m)	216 lb (98 kg)	Fr	The Hun School of Princeton	Napa, CA
F	44	Nick Loew (W)	6 ft 8 in (2.03 m)	220 lb (100 kg)	So	Burlingame	Burlingame, CA
G	45	Mladen Djordjevic	6 ft 3 in (1.91 m)	184 lb (83 kg)	So	Tamiš Club	Belgrade, Serbia

Head coach

- Kyle Smith (Hamilton)

Assistant coach(es)

- Derrick Phelps (North Carolina)
- Todd Golden (Saint Mary's)
- Kevin Hovde (Richmond)

Legend

- (C) Team captain
- (S) Suspended
- (I) Ineligible
- (W) Walk-on
- Injured
- Current redshirt

Roster

== Schedule and results ==
Date time, TV	Rank^{#}	Opponent^{#}	Result	Record	Site (attendance) city, state
Non-conference regular season
11/11/2016*; 8:00 pm, TheW.tv		UIC	W 82–80	1–0	War Memorial Gymnasium (2,193); San Francisco, CA
11/16/2016*; 7:00 pm, TheW.tv		at UC Santa Barbara	W 75–63	2–0	The Thunderdome (1,563); Santa Barbara, CA
11/23/2016*; 7:00 pm		Troy	W 79–67	3–0	War Memorial Gymnasium (734); San Francisco, CA
11/26/2016*; 3:35 pm		vs. Sacramento State; EWU Men's Basketball Classic	W 77–59	4–0	Reese Court (300); Cheney, WA
11/27/2016*; 6:05 pm		at Eastern Washington; EWU Men's Basketball Classic	L 90–96	4–1	Reese Court (1,088); Cheney, WA
11/30/2016*; 7:00 pm, TheW.tv		Alcorn State	W 78–65	5–1	War Memorial Gymnasium (513); San Francisco, CA
12/02/2016*; 7:00 pm, TheW.tv		Lamar	W 82–63	6–1	War Memorial Gymnasium (963); San Francisco, CA
12/06/2016*; 7:00 pm, TheW.tv		San Francisco State	W 91–59	7–1	Kezar Pavilion (1,728); San Francisco, CA
12/16/2016*; 7:00 pm, TheW.tv		Portland State	L 78–82	7–2	War Memorial Gymnasium (1,080); San Francisco, CA
12/19/2016*; 7:00 pm, TheW.tv		Abilene Christian	W 86–51	8–2	War Memorial Gymnasium (1,163); San Francisco, CA
12/22/2016*; 8:00 pm, ESPNU		vs. Utah; Diamond Head Classic quarterfinals	W 89–86	9–2	Stan Sheriff Center (6,659); Honolulu, HI
12/23/2016*; 7:00 pm, ESPN2		vs. Illinois State; Diamond Head Classic semifinals	W 66–58	10–2	Stan Sheriff Center (6,053); Honolulu, HI
12/25/2016*; 5:00 pm, ESPN2		vs. San Diego State; Diamond Head Classic championship game	L 48–62	10–3	Stan Sheriff Center (6,118); Honolulu, HI
WCC regular season
12/29/2016; 7:00 pm		San Diego	W 80–74	11–3 (1–0)	War Memorial Gymnasium (2,115); San Francisco, CA
12/31/2016; 3:00 pm, CSNBA		at Santa Clara	L 58–72	11–4 (1–1)	Leavey Center (1,389); Santa Clara, CA
01/05/2017; 6:00 pm, ESPN2		No. 5 Gonzaga	L 80–95	11–5 (1–2)	War Memorial Gymnasium (3,814); San Francisco, CA
01/07/2017; 8:00 pm, CSNBA		No. 19 Saint Mary's	L 52–63	11–6 (1–3)	War Memorial Gymnasium (2,456); San Francisco, CA
01/12/2017; 6:00 pm, BYUtv		at BYU	L 75–85	11–7 (1–4)	Marriott Center (13,917); Provo, UT
01/14/2017; 7:00 pm, CSNBA		Pacific	W 72–51	12–7 (2–4)	War Memorial Gymnasium (1,410); San Francisco, CA
01/19/2017; 7:00 pm		Portland	W 75–50	13–7 (3–4)	War Memorial Gymnasium (1,842); San Francisco, CA
01/21/2017; 6:00 pm		at San Diego	W 60–43	14–7 (4–4)	Jenny Craig Pavilion (1,730); San Diego, CA
01/26/2017; 8:00 pm, CSNBA		at No. 21 Saint Mary's	L 46–66	14–8 (4–5)	McKeon Pavilion (3,233); Moraga, CA
01/28/2017; 1:00 pm, CSNBA		at Pacific	W 81–60	15–8 (5–5)	Alex G. Spanos Center (2,004); Stockton, CA
02/02/2017; 7:00 pm		Pepperdine	W 77–56	16–8 (6–5)	War Memorial Gymnasium (1,975); San Francisco, CA
02/04/2017; 7:00 pm		Loyola Marymount	W 74–64	17–8 (7–5)	War Memorial Gymnasium (3,341); San Francisco, CA
02/09/2017; 8:00 pm, CSNBA		Santa Clara	W 61–58	18–8 (8–5)	War Memorial Gymnasium (2,005); San Francisco, CA
02/11/2017; 8:00 pm, CSNCA		BYU	L 52–68	18–9 (8–6)	War Memorial Gymnasium (3,084); San Francisco, CA
02/16/2017; 6:00 pm, CSNCA		at No. 1 Gonzaga	L 61–96	18–10 (8–7)	McCarthey Athletic Center (6,000); Spokane, WA
02/18/2017; 7:00 pm		at Portland	W 65–51	19–10 (9–7)	Chiles Center (3,259); Portland, OR
02/23/2017; 7:00 pm		at Loyola Marymount	L 51–53	19–11 (9–8)	Gersten Pavilion (2,213); Los Angeles, CA
02/25/2017; 1:00 pm, SPCSN		at Pepperdine	W 76–65	20–11 (10–8)	Firestone Fieldhouse (1,073); Malibu, CA
WCC tournament
03/04/2017; 3:00 pm, SPCSN	(5)	vs. (4) Santa Clara; Quarterfinals	L 69–76	20–12	Orleans Arena (7,461); Paradise, NV
CBI
03/15/2017*; 5:00 pm		at Rice; First Round	L 76–85	20–13	Tudor Fieldhouse (1,349); Houston, TX
*Non-conference game. ^{#}Rankings from AP Poll. (#) Tournament seedings in parentheses. All times are in Pacific Time.
