= 2016–17 Pepperdine Waves men's basketball team =

American college basketball season

2016–17 Pepperdine Waves men's basketball
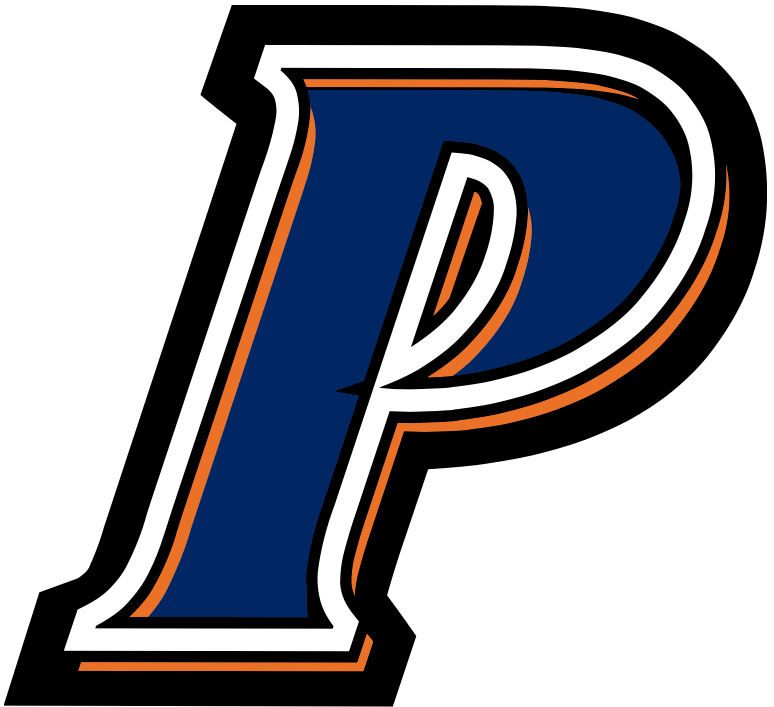
- Conference: West Coast Conference
- Record: 9–22 (5–13 WCC)
- Head coach: Marty Wilson (6th season)
- Assistant coaches: Mark Amaral; Bryant Moore; John Impelman
- Home arena: Firestone Fieldhouse

2016–17 West Coast Conference men's basketball standings
	Conf.				Overall
Team	W		L	PCT	W		L	PCT
No. 2 Gonzaga †	17	–	1	.944	37	–	2	.949
No. 22 Saint Mary's	16	–	2	.889	29	–	5	.853
BYU	12	–	6	.667	22	–	12	.647
San Francisco	10	–	8	.556	20	–	13	.606
Santa Clara	10	–	8	.556	17	–	16	.515
Loyola Marymount	8	–	10	.444	15	–	15	.500
San Diego	6	–	12	.333	13	–	18	.419
Pepperdine	5	–	13	.278	9	–	22	.290
Pacific	4	–	14	.222	11	–	22	.333
Portland	2	–	16	.111	11	–	22	.333
† Conference tournament winner Rankings from AP poll

The 2016–17 Pepperdine Waves men's basketball team represented Pepperdine University during the 2016–17 NCAA Division I men's basketball season. This was head coach Marty Wilson's sixth full season at Pepperdine. The Waves played their home games at the Firestone Fieldhouse in Malibu, California as members of the West Coast Conference. They finished the season 9–22, 5–13 in WCC play to finish in eighth place. They lost in the first round of the WCC tournament to Pacific.

== Previous season ==
The Waves finished the 2015–16 season 18–14, 10–8 in WCC play to finish in fourth place. They defeated San Francisco in the WCC tournament to advance to the semifinals where they lost to Saint Mary's. The received an invitation to the College Basketball Invitational tournament where they lost in the first round to Eastern Washington.

== Departures ==
Name	Number	Pos.	Height	Weight	Year	Hometown	Notes
John Yi	2	G	5'9"	160	Sophomore	Yorba Linda, CA	Walk-on; didn't return
Stacey Davis	5	F	6'6"	235	Senior	Laveen, AZ	Graduated
Jamani Spencer	10	G	6'0"	180	Freshman	Porter Ranch, CA	Walk-on; transferred to Worcester Poly
Atif Russell	11	G/F	6'5"	210	Senior	Katy, TX	Graduated
A. J. Lapray	20	G	6'5"	190	RS Sophomore	Salem, OR	Retired from basketball due to a hip injury
Shawn Olden	22	G	6'3"	175	Sophomore	Tulsa, OK	Transferred to New Mexico JC
Hakeem Anchrum	24	F	6'6"	225	Freshman	Birmingham, AL	Walk-on; didn't return
A. J. John	25	F	6'8"	225	Sophomore	Santa Rosa, CA	Transferred to UC Davis
Jake Johnson	34	F/C	6'10"	220	Senior	Reno, NV	Walk-on; graduated
Jett Raines	45	F	6'7"	225	Senior	Coppell, TX	Graduated

=== Incoming transfers ===
Name	Number	Pos.	Height	Weight	Year	Hometown	Notes
Eric Cooper, Jr.	2	G	6'3"	180	Sophomore	Long Beach, CA	Transferred from Nevada. Under NCAA transfer rules, Cooper, Jr. will have to sit out for the 2016–17 season. Will have three years of remaining eligibility.
Chris Reyes	14	F	6'7"	236	Senior	La Verne, CA	Transferred from Utah. Will be eligible to play immediately since Reyes graduated from Utah.

== Recruiting Class of 2016 ==
College recruiting information
Name	Hometown	School	Height	Weight	Commit date
Craig LeCesne #109 SF	Hagerstown, MD	St. James School	6 ft 8 in (2.03 m)	175 lb (79 kg)	Oct 28, 2015
Craig LeCesne #109 SF	Recruit ratings: Scout: Rivals: (60)				
Knox Hellums; SG	Tomball, TX	Concordia Lutheran High School	6 ft 5 in (1.96 m)	190 lb (86 kg)	Sep 28, 2015
Knox Hellums; SG	Recruit ratings: Scout: Rivals: (0)				
Elijah Lee; PG	Houston, TX	Homeschool Christian Youth Association	5 ft 10 in (1.78 m)	N/A	
Elijah Lee; PG	Recruit ratings: Scout: Rivals: (0)				
Nolan Taylor; PF	Keller, TX	Keller High School	6 ft 7 in (2.01 m)	N/A	
Nolan Taylor; PF	Recruit ratings: Scout: Rivals: (60)				
Overall recruit ranking: Scout: nr Rivals: nr ESPN: nr
Note: In many cases, Scout, Rivals, 247Sports, On3, and ESPN may conflict in their listings of height and weight.; In these cases, the average was taken. ESPN grades are on a 100-point scale.; Sources: "Pepperdine Waves 2016 Basketball Commitments". Rivals.; "2016 Pepperdine Waves Basketball Commits". Scout.; "ESPN 2016 Pepperdine Waves Basketball recruits". ESPN.; "Scout.com Team Recruiting Rankings". Scout.; "2016 Team Ranking". Rivals.

== Roster ==
2016–17 Pepperdine Waves men's basketball team
Players
Coaches

Pos.	#	Name	Height	Weight	Year	Previous school	Hometown
G	0	Amadi Udenyi	6 ft 0 in (1.83 m)	195 lb (88 kg)	Sr	De La Salle HS; St. Thomas More	Oakland, CA
G	1	Elijah Lee	5 ft 10 in (1.78 m)	155 lb (70 kg)	Fr	Homeschool Christian Youth Ass.	Houston, TX
G	2	Eric Cooper, Jr. (I) (redshirt)	6 ft 3 in (1.91 m)	195 lb (88 kg)	Jr	IMG Academy; Nevada	Ontario, CA
G	3	Jeremy Major	5 ft 10 in (1.78 m)	175 lb (79 kg)	Sr	Maranatha HS	Pasadena, CA
C	12	Nate Gehring	6 ft 10 in (2.08 m)	225 lb (102 kg)	RS So	Waukee HS	Waukee, IA
F	14	Chris Reyes	6 ft 7 in (2.01 m)	235 lb (107 kg)	Sr	Damien HS; Utah	La Verne, CA
F	20	Kameron Edwards	6 ft 6 in (1.98 m)	215 lb (98 kg)	So	Etiwanda HS	Rancho Cucamonga, CA
G	21	Knox Hellums	6 ft 5 in (1.96 m)	180 lb (82 kg)	Fr	Concordia Lutheran HS	Tomball, TX
G	23	Jonathan Allen (W)	6 ft 2 in (1.88 m)	200 lb (91 kg)	Sr	Ravenwood HS	Nashville, TN
F	24	Craig LeCesne	6 ft 9 in (2.06 m)	225 lb (102 kg)	Fr	St. James School	Oxie, Sweden
G/F	30	Lamond Murray Jr.	6 ft 5 in (1.96 m)	200 lb (91 kg)	Sr	Bishop Montgomery HS	Torrance, CA
F	31	Nolan Taylor	6 ft 7 in (2.01 m)	250 lb (113 kg)	Fr	Keller HS	Keller, TX
G	32	Kaijae Yee-Stephens	6 ft 1 in (1.85 m)	190 lb (86 kg)	Fr	Santa Cruz HS	Santa Cruz, CA
C	44	Ryan Kennan	6 ft 10 in (2.08 m)	240 lb (109 kg)	RS So	East Ridge HS	Woodbury, MN

Head coach

- Marty Wilson (Pepperdine)

Assistant coach(es)

- Marak Amaral (College of Idaho)
- Bryant Moore (Texas Tech)
- John Impelman (Occidental)

Legend

- (C) Team captain
- (S) Suspended
- (I) Ineligible
- (W) Walk-on
- Injured
- Current redshirt

Roster

== Schedule and results ==
Date time, TV	Rank^{#}	Opponent^{#}	Result	Record	Site (attendance) city, state
Non conference regular season
11/11/2016*; 7:00 pm		Cal Poly	W 77–68	1–0	Firestone Fieldhouse (1,320); Malibu, CA
11/15/2016*; 7:00 pm		Weber State	W 69–68	2–0	Firestone Fieldhouse (1,020); Malibu, CA
11/17/2016*; 7:00 pm		Life Pacific; Lone Star Showcase	W 85–79	3–0	Firestone Fieldhouse (985); Malibu, CA
11/21/2016*; 5:30 pm		vs. Central Michigan; Lone Star Showcase	L 77–88	3–1	H-E-B Center at Cedar Park; Cedar Park, TX
11/22/2016*; 5:30 pm		vs. Little Rock; Lone Star Showcase	W 66–65	4–1	H-E-B Center at Cedar Park; Cedar Park, TX
11/23/2016*; 3:00 pm		vs. St. Bonaventure; Lone Star Showcase	L 63–89	4–2	H-E-B Center at Cedar Park; Cedar Park, TX
11/27/2016*; 2:30 pm		Portland State	L 85–91	4–3	Firestone Fieldhouse (1,021); Malibu, CA
12/03/2016*; 5:00 pm		Belmont	L 77–85	4–4	Firestone Fieldhouse (1,340); Malibu, CA
12/07/2016*; 7:30 pm		at Long Beach State	L 66–75	4–5	Walter Pyramid (2,563); Long Beach, CA
12/11/2016*; 7:00 pm, P12N		at USC	L 67–93	4–6	Galen Center (2,928); Los Angeles, CA
12/20/2016*; 5:00 pm		at Louisiana–Lafayette	L 64–90	4–7	Cajundome (3,582); Lafayette, LA
12/22/2016*; 6:00 pm		at Montana	L 70–71	4–8	Dahlberg Arena (3,476); Missoula, MT
WCC regular season
12/29/2016; 6:00 pm, RTNW		at No. 7 Gonzaga	L 62–92	4–9 (0–1)	McCarthey Athletic Center (6,000); Spokane, WA
12/31/2016; 5:00 pm		at Portland	L 60–73	4–10 (0–2)	Chiles Center (1,624); Portland, OR
01/05/2017; 7:00 pm		Loyola Marymount	W 71–70	5–10 (1–2)	Firestone Fieldhouse (1,572); Malibu, CA
01/07/2017; 1:00 pm, SPCSN		San Diego	L 68–76	5–11 (1–3)	Firestone Fieldhouse (1,007); Malibu, CA
01/12/2017; 7:00 pm		at Pacific	L 74–79	5–12 (1–4)	Alex G. Spanos Center (1,669); Stockton, CA
01/14/2017; 5:00 pm, SPCSN		Santa Clara	L 61–75	5–13 (1–5)	Firestone Fieldhouse (1,053); Malibu, CA
01/19/2017; 6:00 pm, BYUtv		at BYU	L 70–99	5–14 (1–6)	Marriott Center (13,410); Provo, UT
01/21/2017; 8:00 pm, CSNBA		at No. 23 Saint Mary's	L 65–85	5–15 (1–7)	McKeon Pavilion (3,500); Moraga, CA
01/26/2017; 7:30 pm, SPCSN		Portland	W 78–60	6–15 (2–7)	Firestone Fieldhouse (1,079); Malibu, CA
01/28/2017; 7:00 pm, ESPN2		No. 3 Gonzaga	L 49–96	6–16 (2–8)	Firestone Fieldhouse (3,104); Malibu, CA
02/02/2017; 7:00 pm		at San Francisco	L 56–77	6–17 (2–9)	War Memorial Gymnasium (1,975); San Francisco, CA
02/04/2017; 5:00 pm		Pacific	W 82–72	7–17 (3–9)	Firestone Fieldhouse (1,103); Malibu, CA
02/09/2017; 8:00 pm, ESPNU		BYU	W 99–83	8–17 (4–9)	Firestone Fieldhouse (2,375); Malibu, CA
02/11/2017; 6:00 pm, SPCSN		at San Diego	W 65–60	9–17 (5–9)	Jenny Craig Pavilion (1,276); San Diego, CA
02/16/2017; 7:00 pm		at Santa Clara	L 55–106	9–18 (5–10)	Leavey Center (1,216); Santa Clara, CA
02/18/2017; 3:00 pm, SPCSN		at Loyola Marymount	L 61–82	9–19 (5–11)	Gersten Pavilion (2,418); Los Angeles, CA
02/23/2017; 7:00 pm		No. 20 Saint Mary's	L 49–78	9–20 (5–12)	Firestone Fieldhouse (1,106); Malibu, CA
02/25/2017; 1:00 pm, SPCSN		San Francisco	L 65–76	9–21 (5–13)	Firestone Fieldhouse (1,073); Malibu, CA
WCC tournament
03/03/2017; 6:00 pm, BYUtv	(8)	vs. (9) Pacific; First round	L 84–89	9–22	Orleans Arena (7,484); Paradise, NV
*Non-conference game. ^{#}Rankings from AP Poll. (#) Tournament seedings in parentheses. All times are in Pacific Time.
