= 2016–17 Loyola Marymount Lions men's basketball team =

American college basketball season

2016–17 Loyola Marymount Lions men's basketball
- Conference: West Coast Conference
- Record: 15–15 (8–10 WCC)
- Head coach: Mike Dunlap (3rd season)
- Assistant coaches: Reggie Morris, Jr.; Ray Johnson; Brannon Hays
- Home arena: Gersten Pavilion

2016–17 West Coast Conference men's basketball standings
	Conf.				Overall
Team	W		L	PCT	W		L	PCT
No. 2 Gonzaga †	17	–	1	.944	37	–	2	.949
No. 22 Saint Mary's	16	–	2	.889	29	–	5	.853
BYU	12	–	6	.667	22	–	12	.647
San Francisco	10	–	8	.556	20	–	13	.606
Santa Clara	10	–	8	.556	17	–	16	.515
Loyola Marymount	8	–	10	.444	15	–	15	.500
San Diego	6	–	12	.333	13	–	18	.419
Pepperdine	5	–	13	.278	9	–	22	.290
Pacific	4	–	14	.222	11	–	22	.333
Portland	2	–	16	.111	11	–	22	.333
† Conference tournament winner Rankings from AP poll

The 2016–17 Loyola Marymount Lions men's basketball team represented Loyola Marymount University during the 2016–17 NCAA Division I men's basketball season. The Lions were led by third-year head coach Mike Dunlap. They played their home games at Gersten Pavilion in Los Angeles, California as members of the West Coast Conference. They finished the season 15–15, 8–10 in WCC play to finish in sixth place. They lost in the quarterfinals of the WCC tournament to BYU.

== Previous season ==
The Lions finished the 2015–16 season 14–17, 6–12 in WCC play to finish in a three-way tie for seventh place. They defeated San Diego in the first round of the WCC tournament before losing to Saint Mary's in the quarterfinals.

== Offseason ==
=== Departures ===
Name	Number	Pos.	Height	Weight	Year	Hometown	Notes
Adom Jacko	4	F	6'8"	225	Junior	Upland, CA	Playing professional overseas
Matt Hayes	5	G	6'1"	170	Junior	Elk Grove, CA	Left the team for personal reasons
Tyler Baptiste	33	G	5'11"	175	Sophomore	Los Angeles, CA	Walk-on; didn't return
Martin Mornar	42	F	6'9"	205	Senior	Zagreb, Croatia	Graduated
David Humphries	45	G	6'4"	210	Senior	Adelaide, Australia	Graduated

=== Incoming transfers ===
Name	Number	Pos.	Height	Weight	Year	Hometown	Notes
Kelvin Amayo	2	G	6'4"	220	Senior	Newark, NJ	Transferred from Iona. Will be eligible to play immediately since Amayo graduated from Iona.
Stefan Jovanovic	15	C	6'10"	235	Senior	Kraljevo, Serbia	Transferred from Hawaii. Will be eligible to play immediately since Jovanovic graduated from Hawaii.
Trevor Manuel	34	F	6'9"	200	Sophomore	Lansing, MI	Transferred from Oregon. Under NCAA transfer rules, Manuel will have to sit out in the 2016–17 season. Will have three years of eligibility left.

=== 2016 recruiting class ===
College recruiting information
Name	Hometown	School	Height	Weight	Commit date
Donald Gipson #70 SF	Los Angeles, CA	Fairfax High School	6 ft 4 in (1.93 m)	180 lb (82 kg)	Sep 19, 2015
Donald Gipson #70 SF	Recruit ratings: Scout: Rivals: (69)				
Mattias Markusson; C	Stockholm, Sweden	Jamtland Basket	7 ft 1 in (2.16 m)	N/A	
Mattias Markusson; C	Recruit ratings: Scout: Rivals: (NR)				
Overall recruit ranking: Scout: nr Rivals: nr ESPN: nr
Note: In many cases, Scout, Rivals, 247Sports, On3, and ESPN may conflict in their listings of height and weight.; In these cases, the average was taken. ESPN grades are on a 100-point scale.; Sources: "Loyola Marymount Lions 2016 Basketball Commitments". Rivals.; "2016 Loyola Marymount Lions Basketball Commits". Scout.; "ESPN 2016 Loyola Marymount Lions Basketball recruits". ESPN.; "Scout.com Team Recruiting Rankings". Scout.; "2016 Team Ranking". Rivals.

=== 2017 Recruiting class ===
College recruiting information (2017)
Name	Hometown	School	Height	Weight	Commit date
Ryse Williams #53 SG	Redondo Beach, CA	Redondo Union High School	6 ft 2 in (1.88 m)	185 lb (84 kg)	Jul 18, 2016
Ryse Williams #53 SG	Recruit ratings: Scout: Rivals: (75)				
Zafir Williams #56 PF	Long Beach, CA	Long Beach Polytechnic High School	6 ft 5 in (1.96 m)	175 lb (79 kg)	Jul 20, 2016
Zafir Williams #56 PF	Recruit ratings: Scout: Rivals: (72)				
Overall recruit ranking: Scout: nr Rivals: nr ESPN: nr
Note: In many cases, Scout, Rivals, 247Sports, On3, and ESPN may conflict in their listings of height and weight.; In these cases, the average was taken. ESPN grades are on a 100-point scale.; Sources: "Loyola Marymount Lions 2017 Basketball Commitments". Rivals.; "2017 Loyola Marymount Lions Basketball Commits". Scout.; "ESPN 2017 Loyola Marymount Lions Basketball recruits". ESPN.; "Scout.com Team Recruiting Rankings". Scout.; "2017 Team Ranking". Rivals.

== Roster ==
2016–17 Loyola Marymount Lions men's basketball team
Players
Coaches

Pos.	#	Name	Height	Weight	Year	Previous school	Hometown
G	2	Kelvin Amayo	6 ft 4 in (1.93 m)	225 lb (102 kg)	RS Sr	NIA Prep; Iona	Newark, NJ
G	3	Munis Tutu	6 ft 1 in (1.85 m)	165 lb (75 kg)	So	La Lumiere School	Winsdor, ON
G	5	Donald Gipson	6 ft 3 in (1.91 m)	190 lb (86 kg)	Fr	Fairfax HS	Los Angeles, CA
G	10	Brandon Brown	5 ft 11 in (1.8 m)	160 lb (73 kg)	Sr	César Chávez HS; Phoenix College	Laveen, AZ
F	11	Petr Herman	6 ft 10 in (2.08 m)	235 lb (107 kg)	Jr	Canarias Academy	Central Bohemian Region, Czech Republic
G/F	12	Steven Haney	6 ft 6 in (1.98 m)	205 lb (93 kg)	RS Jr	St. Aquinas HS; Central Florida	Fort Lauderdale, FL
G	13	Miles Crawford (W)	6 ft 1 in (1.85 m)	165 lb (75 kg)	So	Elev8 Sports Inst	Denton, TX
C	14	Mattias Markusson	7 ft 1 in (2.16 m)	240 lb (109 kg)	Fr	Kfum Jämtland BBK	Vasterled, Stockholm, Sweden
C	15	Stefan Jovanovic	6 ft 10 in (2.08 m)	235 lb (107 kg)	Sr	Bishop Montgomery HS	Kraljevo, Serbia
G	20	Erik Johansson (W)	6 ft 5 in (1.96 m)	190 lb (86 kg)	Fr	Täljegymnasiet	Södertälje, Sweden
G/F	22	Buay Tuach	6 ft 6 in (1.98 m)	185 lb (84 kg)	Sr	South HS; Northeast CC	Omaha, NE
F	24	Shamar Johnson	6 ft 7 in (2.01 m)	255 lb (116 kg)	Sr	Pine Forest HS; Pensacola State College	Pensacola, FL
G	25	Jeffery McClendon	6 ft 1 in (1.85 m)	210 lb (95 kg)	So	Eastside HS	Lancaster, CA
F	34	Trevor Manuel (I) (redshirt)	6 ft 9 in (2.06 m)	185 lb (84 kg)	So	Everett HS; Oregon	Lansing, MI

Head coach

- Mike Dunlap (Loyola Marymount)

Assistant coach(es)

- Reggie Morris, Jr. (Howard)
- Patrick Sandle (San Francisco State)
- Brannon Hays (Cal Lutheran)

Legend

- (C) Team captain
- (S) Suspended
- (I) Ineligible
- (W) Walk-on
- Injured
- Current redshirt

Roster

== Schedule and results ==
Date time, TV	Rank^{#}	Opponent^{#}	Result	Record	Site (attendance) city, state
Exhibition
11/04/2016*; 7:00 pm		Sonoma State	W 80–50		Gersten Pavilion; Los Angeles, CA
Non-conference regular season
11/11/2016*; 7:00 pm		Vanguard	W 99–51	1–0	Gersten Pavilion (2,118); Los Angeles, CA
11/14/2016*; 7:00 pm		at Nevada	L 64–79	1–1	Lawlor Events Center (6,176); Reno, NV
11/17/2016*; 7:00 pm, SNY/ESPN3		UConn	L 62–65	1–2	Gersten Pavilion (4,156); Los Angeles, CA
11/25/2016*; 7:00 pm		Portland State	W 78–62	2–2	Gersten Pavilion (1,219); Los Angeles, CA
12/05/2016*; 7:00 pm		Boise State	L 79–80	2–3	Gersten Pavilion (1,332); Los Angeles, CA
12/08/2016*; 7:00 pm		Southern Utah	W 75–68	3–3	Gersten Pavilion (1,561); Los Angeles, CA
12/10/2016*; 7:00 pm		at Cal State Northridge	W 69–68	4–3	Matadome (787); Northridge, CA
12/17/2016*; 4:00 pm		Incarnate Word	W 91–90 ^{OT}	5–3	Gersten Pavilion (1,612); Los Angeles, CA
12/19/2016*; 6:00 pm		at Colorado State	W 69–66	6–3	Moby Arena (2,476); Fort Collins, CO
12/22/2016*; 7:00 pm		Texas–Arlington	L 77–80	6–4	Gersten Pavilion (1,327); Los Angeles, CA
12/26/2016*; 5:00 pm		Morgan State	W 70–49	7–4	Gersten Pavilion (1,849); Los Angeles, CA
WCC regular season
12/29/2016; 8:00 pm, ESPNU		No. 19 Saint Mary's	L 60–72	7–5 (0–1)	Gersten Pavilion (2,461); Los Angeles, CA
12/31/2016; 1:00 pm, SPCSN		BYU	L 76–81	7–6 (0–2)	Gersten Pavilion (3,221); Los Angeles, CA
01/05/2017; 7:00 pm		at Pepperdine	L 70–71	7–7 (0–3)	Firestone Fieldhouse (1,572); Malibu, CA
01/07/2017; 3:00 pm, SPCSN		Santa Clara	W 66–56	8–7 (1–3)	Gersten Pavilion (2,060); Los Angeles, CA
01/12/2017; 6:00 pm, RTNW		at No. 5 Gonzaga	L 55–93	8–8 (1–4)	McCarthey Athletic Center (6,000); Spokane, WA
01/14/2017; 7:00 pm, RTNW		at Portland	W 79–78	9–8 (2–4)	Chiles Center (1,597); Portland, OR
01/19/2017; 7:00 pm, SPCSN		San Diego	L 62–69	9–9 (2–5)	Gersten Pavilion (1,712); Los Angeles, CA
01/21/2017; 1:00 pm, SPCSN		at Santa Clara	L 63–64	9–10 (2–6)	Leavey Center (1,793); Santa Clara, CA
01/26/2017; 7:00 pm		Pacific	W 79–73	10–10 (3–6)	Gersten Pavilion (1,620); Los Angeles, CA
01/28/2017; 6:00 pm, BYUtv		at BYU	L 77–85	10–11 (3–7)	Marriott Center (15,189); Provo, UT
02/02/2017; 7:00 pm		at San Diego	W 72–53	11–11 (4–7)	Jenny Craig Pavilion (1,230); San Diego, CA
02/04/2017; 7:00 pm		at San Francisco	L 64–74	11–12 (4–8)	War Memorial Gymnasium (3,341); San Francisco, CA
02/09/2017; 7:00 pm, SPCSN		No. 1 Gonzaga	L 60–90	11–13 (4–9)	Gersten Pavilion (4,068); Los Angeles, CA
02/11/2017; 1:00 pm, SPCSN		Portland	W 66–60	12–13 (5–9)	Gersten Pavilion (3,230); Los Angeles, CA
02/16/2017; 8:00 pm, SPCSN		at No. 22 Saint Mary's	L 48–81	12–14 (5–10)	McKeon Pavilion (2,944); Moraga, CA
02/18/2017; 3:00 pm, SPCSN		Pepperdine	W 82–61	13–14 (6–10)	Gersten Pavilion (2,418); Los Angeles, CA
02/23/2017; 7:00 pm		San Francisco	W 53–51	14–14 (7–10)	Gersten Pavilion (2,213); Los Angeles, CA
02/25/2017; 7:00 pm		at Pacific	W 67–66	15–14 (8–10)	Alex G. Spanos Center (2,819); Stockton, CA
WCC tournament
03/04/2017; 1:00 pm, SPCSN	(6)	vs. (3) BYU; Quarterfinals	L 81–89	15–15	Orleans Arena (7,461); Paradise, NV
*Non-conference game. ^{#}Rankings from AP Poll. (#) Tournament seedings in parentheses.
