= 2016–17 Saint Mary's Gaels men's basketball team =

American college basketball season

2016–17 Saint Mary's Gaels men's basketball

NCAA tournament, Second Round
- Conference: West Coast Conference

Ranking
- AP: No. 22
- Record: 29–5 (16–2 WCC)
- Head coach: Randy Bennett (16th season)
- Assistant coaches: Marty Clarke; Marcus Schroeder; David Carter
- Home arena: McKeon Pavilion

2016–17 West Coast Conference men's basketball standings
	Conf.				Overall
Team	W		L	PCT	W		L	PCT
No. 2 Gonzaga †	17	–	1	.944	37	–	2	.949
No. 22 Saint Mary's	16	–	2	.889	29	–	5	.853
BYU	12	–	6	.667	22	–	12	.647
San Francisco	10	–	8	.556	20	–	13	.606
Santa Clara	10	–	8	.556	17	–	16	.515
Loyola Marymount	8	–	10	.444	15	–	15	.500
San Diego	6	–	12	.333	13	–	18	.419
Pepperdine	5	–	13	.278	9	–	22	.290
Pacific	4	–	14	.222	11	–	22	.333
Portland	2	–	16	.111	11	–	22	.333
† Conference tournament winner Rankings from AP poll

The 2016–17 Saint Mary's Gaels men's basketball team represented Saint Mary's College of California during the 2016–17 NCAA Division I men's basketball season. This was head coach Randy Bennett's 16th season at Saint Mary's. The Gaels competed in the West Coast Conference and played their home games at the McKeon Pavilion in Moraga, California. They finished the season 29–5, 16–2 in WCC play to finish in second place. In the WCC tournament, they defeated Portland and BYU before losing to Gonzaga in the championship game. They received an at-large bid to the NCAA tournament. As the No. 7 seed in the West region, they beat VCU in the first round before losing to No. 2-seeded Arizona in the second round.

== Previous season ==
The Gaels finished the 2015–16 season 29–6, 15–3 in WCC play to win a share of the WCC regular season conference championship. They defeated Loyola Marymount and Pepperdine to advance to the championship game of the WCC tournament where they lost to Gonzaga. As a regular season conference champion and No. 1 seed in their conference tournament who failed to win their conference tournament, they received an automatic bid to the National Invitation Tournament. As a No. 2 seed in the NIT, they defeated New Mexico State and Georgia to advance to the quarterfinals before losing to Valparaiso.

== Offseason ==
=== Departures ===
Name	Number	Pos.	Height	Weight	Year	Hometown	Notes
Jack Biebel	11	G	5'11"	185	Junior	San Jose, CA	Walk-on; transferred to Cal State Monterey Bay
Franklin Porter	43	G	6'4"	210	Freshman	Portland, OR	Transferred to Portland

=== 2016 recruiting class ===
College recruiting information
Name	Hometown	School	Height	Weight	Commit date
Jordan Ford #35 PG	Folsom, CA	Folsom High School	6 ft 1 in (1.85 m)	155 lb (70 kg)	Sep 7, 2015
Jordan Ford #35 PG	Recruit ratings: Scout: Rivals: (79)				
Elijah Thomas #56 SF	Peoria, AZ	Sunrise Mountain High School	6 ft 5 in (1.96 m)	205 lb (93 kg)	Sep 30, 2015
Elijah Thomas #56 SF	Recruit ratings: Scout: Rivals: (73)				
Jock Perry; C	Melbourne, Australia	Centre of Excellence	7 ft 1 in (2.16 m)	260 lb (120 kg)	Sep 30, 2015
Jock Perry; C	Recruit ratings: Scout: Rivals: (NR)				
Overall recruit ranking: Scout: nr Rivals: nr ESPN: nr
Note: In many cases, Scout, Rivals, 247Sports, On3, and ESPN may conflict in their listings of height and weight.; In these cases, the average was taken. ESPN grades are on a 100-point scale.; Sources: "ESPN". ESPN.; "2016 Team Ranking". Rivals.

=== 2017 recruiting class ===
College recruiting information (2017)
Name	Hometown	School	Height	Weight	Commit date
Kristers Zoriks #46 PG	Dobele, Latvia	New Hampton School	6 ft 3 in (1.91 m)	170 lb (77 kg)	Sep 20, 2016
Kristers Zoriks #46 PG	Recruit ratings: Scout: Rivals: (78)				
Overall recruit ranking: Scout: nr Rivals: nr ESPN: nr
Note: In many cases, Scout, Rivals, 247Sports, On3, and ESPN may conflict in their listings of height and weight.; In these cases, the average was taken. ESPN grades are on a 100-point scale.; Sources: "ESPN". ESPN.; "2017 Team Ranking". Rivals.

== Preseason ==
The Gaels were picked to finish second in the WCC preseason poll. Emmett Naar, Dane Pineau, and Joe Rahon were selected to the All-WCC preseason team. The Gaels were ranked No. 17 in the preseason AP poll and No. 19 in the preseason Coaches Poll.

== Roster ==
2016–17 Saint Mary's Gaels men's basketball team
Players
Coaches

Pos.	#	Name	Height	Weight	Year	Previous school	Hometown
G	00	Tanner Krebs	6 ft 6 in (1.98 m)	200 lb (91 kg)	RS Fr	Lake Ginninderra College	Hobart, Australia
C	1	Jordan Hunter	6 ft 10 in (2.08 m)	230 lb (104 kg)	So	St. Ignatius College	Vaucluse, Australia
G	2	Stefan Gonzalez	6 ft 2 in (1.88 m)	195 lb (88 kg)	So	Highland	Pocatello, ID
G	3	Emmett Naar	6 ft 1 in (1.85 m)	195 lb (88 kg)	RS Jr	Sydney Boys	Sydney, Australia
C	5	Jock Perry	7 ft 1 in (2.16 m)	260 lb (118 kg)	Fr	Lake Ginninderra College	Melbourne, Australia
F	10	Elijah Thomas	6 ft 5 in (1.96 m)	210 lb (95 kg)	Fr	Sunrise Mountain	Peoria, AZ
G	12	Tommy Kuhse (W)	6 ft 2 in (1.88 m)	185 lb (84 kg)	Fr	Mountain View	Mesa, AZ
F	15	Dan Sheets (W)	6 ft 5 in (1.96 m)	200 lb (91 kg)	RS Fr	Dougherty Valley	San Ramon, CA
C	21	Evan Fitzner	6 ft 10 in (2.08 m)	230 lb (104 kg)	RS So	Francis Parker School	San Diego, CA
F	22	Dane Pineau	6 ft 9 in (2.06 m)	225 lb (102 kg)	Sr	Melbourne Grammar	Melbourne, Australia
F	24	Calvin Hermanson	6 ft 6 in (1.98 m)	200 lb (91 kg)	RS Jr	Lake Oswego	Lake Oswego, OR
G	25	Joe Rahon	6 ft 2 in (1.88 m)	195 lb (88 kg)	RS Sr	Torrey Pines	San Diego, CA
G	30	Jordan Ford	6 ft 1 in (1.85 m)	160 lb (73 kg)	Fr	Folsom	Folsom, CA
F	33	Kyle Clark	6 ft 7 in (2.01 m)	215 lb (98 kg)	So	Hellyer College	Wynyard, Australia
C	34	Jock Landale	6 ft 11 in (2.11 m)	255 lb (116 kg)	Jr	Geelong Grammar	Malvern East, Victoria, Australia

Head coach

- Randy Bennett (UC San Diego)

Assistant coach(es)

- Marty Clarke (Victoria)
- Marcus Schroeder (Princeton)
- David Carter (Saint Mary's)

Legend

- (C) Team captain
- (S) Suspended
- (I) Ineligible
- (W) Walk-on
- Injured
- Current redshirt

Roster

== Schedule and results ==
Date time, TV	Rank^{#}	Opponent^{#}	Result	Record	Site (attendance) city, state
Non-conference regular season
11/11/2016*; 8:00 pm, TheW.tv	No. 17	Nevada	W 81–63	1–0	McKeon Pavilion (3,500); Moraga, CA
11/16/2016*; 7:00 pm, TheW.tv	No. 17	Prairie View A&M	W 110–72	2–0	McKeon Pavilion (2,673); Moraga, CA
11/19/2016*; 11:00 am, FCS	No. 17	at Dayton	W 61–57	3–0	UD Arena (13,175); Dayton, OH
11/22/2016*; 7:00 pm, CHN	No. 15	San Jose State	W 81–64	4–0	McKeon Pavilion (3,178); Moraga, CA
11/27/2016*; 2:00 pm, TheW.tv	No. 15	vs. UAB	W 76–63	5–0	Orleans Arena (862); Paradise, NV
11/30/2016*; 8:00 pm, P12N	No. 12	at Stanford	W 66–51	6–0	Maples Pavilion (4,079); Stanford, CA
12/08/2016*; 7:00 pm, TheW.tv	No. 12	Texas–Arlington	L 51–65	6–1	McKeon Pavilion (2,893); Moraga, CA
12/11/2016*; 5:00 pm, CHN	No. 12	UC Irvine	W 84–53	7–1	McKeon Pavilion (3,207); Moraga, CA
12/14/2016*; 7:00 pm, CHN	No. 20	WKU	W 73–51	8–1	McKeon Pavilion (2,581); Moraga, CA
12/20/2016*; 7:00 pm, CHN	No. 19	Texas A&M–Corpus Christi	W 67–46	9–1	McKeon Pavilion (2,859); Moraga, CA
12/22/2016*; 7:00 pm, TheW.tv	No. 19	South Carolina State	W 74–47	10–1	McKeon Pavilion (2,813); Moraga, CA
WCC regular season
12/29/2016; 8:00 pm, ESPNU	No. 19	at Loyola Marymount	W 72–60	11–1 (1–0)	Gersten Pavilion (2,461); Los Angeles, CA
12/31/2016; 6:00 pm	No. 19	San Diego	W 72–60	12–1 (2–0)	McKeon Pavilion (2,891); Moraga, CA
01/05/2017; 8:00 pm, ESPNU	No. 19	BYU	W 81–68	13–1 (3–0)	McKeon Pavilion (3,500); Moraga, CA
01/07/2017; 8:00 pm, CSNBA	No. 19	at San Francisco	W 63–52	14–1 (4–0)	War Memorial Gymnasium (2,456); San Francisco, CA
01/12/2017; 8:00 pm, ESPN2	No. 21	at Portland	W 74–33	15–1 (5–0)	Chiles Center (1,745); Portland, OR
01/14/2017; 7:00 pm, ESPN2	No. 21	at No. 5 Gonzaga; Rivalry	L 56–79	15–2 (5–1)	McCarthey Athletic Center (6,000); Spokane, WA
01/19/2017; 8:00 pm, CSNBA	No. 23	Pacific	W 62–50	16–2 (6–1)	McKeon Pavilion (2,989); Moraga, CA
01/21/2017; 8:00 pm, CSNBA	No. 23	Pepperdine	W 85–65	17–2 (7–1)	McKeon Pavilion (3,500); Moraga, CA
01/26/2017; 8:00 pm, CSNBA	No. 21	San Francisco; Australia Day	W 66–46	18–2 (8–1)	McKeon Pavilion (3,233); Moraga, CA
01/28/2017; 8:00 pm, CSNBA	No. 21	at Santa Clara	W 72–59	19–2 (9–1)	Leavey Center (2,707); Santa Clara, CA
02/02/2017; 8:00 pm, ESPNU	No. 18	at Pacific	W 74–70	20–2 (10–1)	Alex G. Spanos Center (2,401); Stockton, CA
02/04/2017; 4:00 pm, CSNCA	No. 18	at San Diego	W 71–27	21–2 (11–1)	Jenny Craig Pavilion (1,261); San Diego, CA
02/09/2017; 7:00 pm	No. 20	Portland	W 51–41	22–2 (12–1)	McKeon Pavilion (2,813); Moraga, CA
02/11/2017; 5:15 pm, ESPN	No. 20	No. 1 Gonzaga; College GameDay/Rivalry	L 64–74	22–3 (12–2)	McKeon Pavilion (3,500); Moraga, CA
02/16/2017; 8:00 pm, CSNCA	No. 22	Loyola Marymount	W 81–48	23–3 (13–2)	McKeon Pavilion (2,944); Moraga, CA
02/18/2017; 7:00 pm, ESPN2	No. 22	at BYU	W 70–57	24–3 (14–2)	Marriott Center (18,987); Provo, UT
02/23/2017; 7:00 pm	No. 20	at Pepperdine	W 78–49	25–3 (15–2)	Firestone Fieldhouse (1,106); Malibu, CA
02/25/2017; 7:00 pm, TheW.tv	No. 20	Santa Clara	W 70–56	26–3 (16–2)	McKeon Pavilion (3,500); Moraga, CA
WCC tournament
03/04/2017; 9:00 pm, ESPN2	(2) No. 20	vs. (10) Portland; Quarterfinals	W 81–58	27–3	Orleans Arena (7,315); Paradise, NV
03/06/2017; 8:30 pm, ESPN2	(2) No. 19	vs. (3) BYU; Semifinals	W 81–50	28–3	Orleans Arena (8,712); Paradise, NV
03/07/2017; 8:30 pm, ESPN	(2) No. 19	vs. (1) No. 4 Gonzaga; Championship/Rivalry	L 56–74	28–4	Orleans Arena (8,179); Paradise, NV
NCAA tournament
03/16/2017*; 4:20 pm, TBS	(7 W) No. 22	vs. (10 W) VCU; First Round	W 85–77	29–4	Vivint Smart Home Arena (16,341); Salt Lake City, UT
03/18/2017*; 4:45 pm, CBS	(7 W) No. 22	vs. (2 W) No. 4 Arizona; Second Round	L 60–69	29–5	Vivint Smart Home Arena (18,565); Salt Lake City, UT
*Non-conference game. ^{#}Rankings from AP Poll. (#) Tournament seedings in parentheses. W=West. All times are in Pacific Time.

== Rankings ==
Ranking movements Legend: ██ Increase in ranking ██ Decrease in ranking RV = Received votes
	Week																			
Poll	Pre	1	2	3	4	5	6	7	8	9	10	11	12	13	14	15	16	17	18	Final
AP	17	17	15	12	12	20	19	19	19	21	23	21	19	20	22	20	20	19	22	Not released
Coaches	19	17	15	13	11	20	19	19	19	21	23	21	19	20	21	18	18	18	21	RV

*AP does not release post-NCAA tournament rankings
