= 2016–17 West Coast Conference men's basketball season =

- League: NCAA Division I
- Sport: Men's basketball
- Teams: 10

Regular season
- Season champions: Gonzaga
- Runners-up: Saint Mary's
- Season MVP: Nigel Williams-Goss

Tournament
- Champions: Gonzaga
- Runners-up: Saint Mary's

Basketball seasons
- ← 2015–16 2017–18 →

2016–17 West Coast Conference men's basketball standings
	Conf.				Overall
Team	W		L	PCT	W		L	PCT
No. 2 Gonzaga †	17	–	1	.944	37	–	2	.949
No. 22 Saint Mary's	16	–	2	.889	29	–	5	.853
BYU	12	–	6	.667	22	–	12	.647
San Francisco	10	–	8	.556	20	–	13	.606
Santa Clara	10	–	8	.556	17	–	16	.515
Loyola Marymount	8	–	10	.444	15	–	15	.500
San Diego	6	–	12	.333	13	–	18	.419
Pepperdine	5	–	13	.278	9	–	22	.290
Pacific	4	–	14	.222	11	–	22	.333
Portland	2	–	16	.111	11	–	22	.333
† Conference tournament winner Rankings from AP poll

The 2016–17 West Coast Conference men's basketball season began with practices on September 30, 2016 and ended with the 2017 West Coast Conference men's basketball tournament March 2–7, 2017. The regular season began on November 11, 2016, with the conference schedule starting December 29, 2016. This was the 66th season for WCC men's basketball, and the 28th under its current name of "West Coast Conference". The conference was founded in 1952 as the California Basketball Association, became the West Coast Athletic Conference in 1956, and dropped the word "Athletic" in 1989.

On February 18, 2017, Gonzaga clinched a share of the regular season title with win over Pacific. The title was Gonzaga's 16th title in the prior 17 years. Gonzaga clinched the outright regular season conference title on February 24 by beating San Diego.

For the ninth consecutive year, the West Coast Conference tournament was held at the Orleans Arena in Paradise, Nevada from March 3 through March 7, 2017. Gonzaga, appearing in the conference final for the 20th consecutive year, defeated Saint Mary's to win the conference championship. As a result, they received the conference's automatic bid to the NCAA tournament.

Gonzaga's Nigel Williams-Goss was awarded Player of the Year and Newcomer of the Year by the conference. Gonzaga's Mark Few was named coach of the year for the 11th time.

Two WCC schools received bids to the NCAA tournament: Gonzaga and Saint Mary's. Gonzaga received the No. 1 seed in the West region. Gonzaga advanced to the National Championship for the first time in school history, losing to North Carolina. The conference's record in the Tournament was 6–2. BYU also received a postseason bid to the National Invitation Tournament while San Francisco received an invitation to the College Basketball Invitational tournament.

== Head coaches ==
=== Coaching changes ===
- On March 3, 2016, it was announced that Pacific head coach Ron Verlin was no longer employed by the university. Interim coach Mike Burns was also released from his employment with the school. On March 16, the school announced that Damon Stoudamire would be the new head coach.
- On March 7, 2016, head coach Kerry Keating was fired by Santa Clara. On March 29, the school hired Herb Sendek as head coach.
- On March 9, 2016, San Francisco head coach Rex Walters was fired. On March 30, the school hired Kyle Smith as head coach.
- On March 15, 2016, Portland fired head coach Eric Reveno. He finished at Portland with a 10-year record of 140–178. On April 1, the school announced that Terry Porter had been hired as head coach.

=== Coaches ===
Team	Head coach	Previous job	Years at school	Overall record	WCC record	WCC Tournament record	NCAA Tournaments	Sweet Sixteens
BYU	Dave Rose	Dixie State	12	283–99 (.741)	61–25 (.709)	6–5 (.545)	8	1
Gonzaga	Mark Few	Gonzaga (asst.)	18	466–111 (.808)	226–28 (.890)	36–4 (.900)	17	6
Loyola Marymount	Mike Dunlap	Charlotte Bobcats	3	22–40 (.355)	10–26 (.278)	1–2 (.333)	0	0
Pacific	Damon Stoudamire	Memphis Grizzlies (asst.)	1	0–0 (–)	0–0 (–)	0–0 (–)	0	0
Pepperdine	Marty Wilson	Pepperdine (assoc.)	7	76–91 (.455)	39–61 (.390)	3–6 (.333)	0	0
Portland	Terry Porter	N/A	1	0–0 (–)	0–0 (–)	0–0 (–)	0	0
Saint Mary's	Randy Bennett	Saint Louis (asst.)	16	333–131 (.718)	154–68 (.694)	17–13 (.567)	5	1
San Diego	Lamont Smith	New Mexico (asst.)	2	9–21 (.300)	4–14 (.222)	0–1 (.000)	0	0
San Francisco	Kyle Smith	Columbia	1	0–0 (–)	0–0 (–)	0–0 (–)	0	0
Santa Clara	Herb Sendek	Arizona State	1	0–0 (–)	0–0 (–)	0–0 (–)	8	1

Notes:

- Year at school includes 2016–17 season.
- Overall and WCC records are from time at current school and are through the beginning of the 2016–17 season.

== Preseason ==
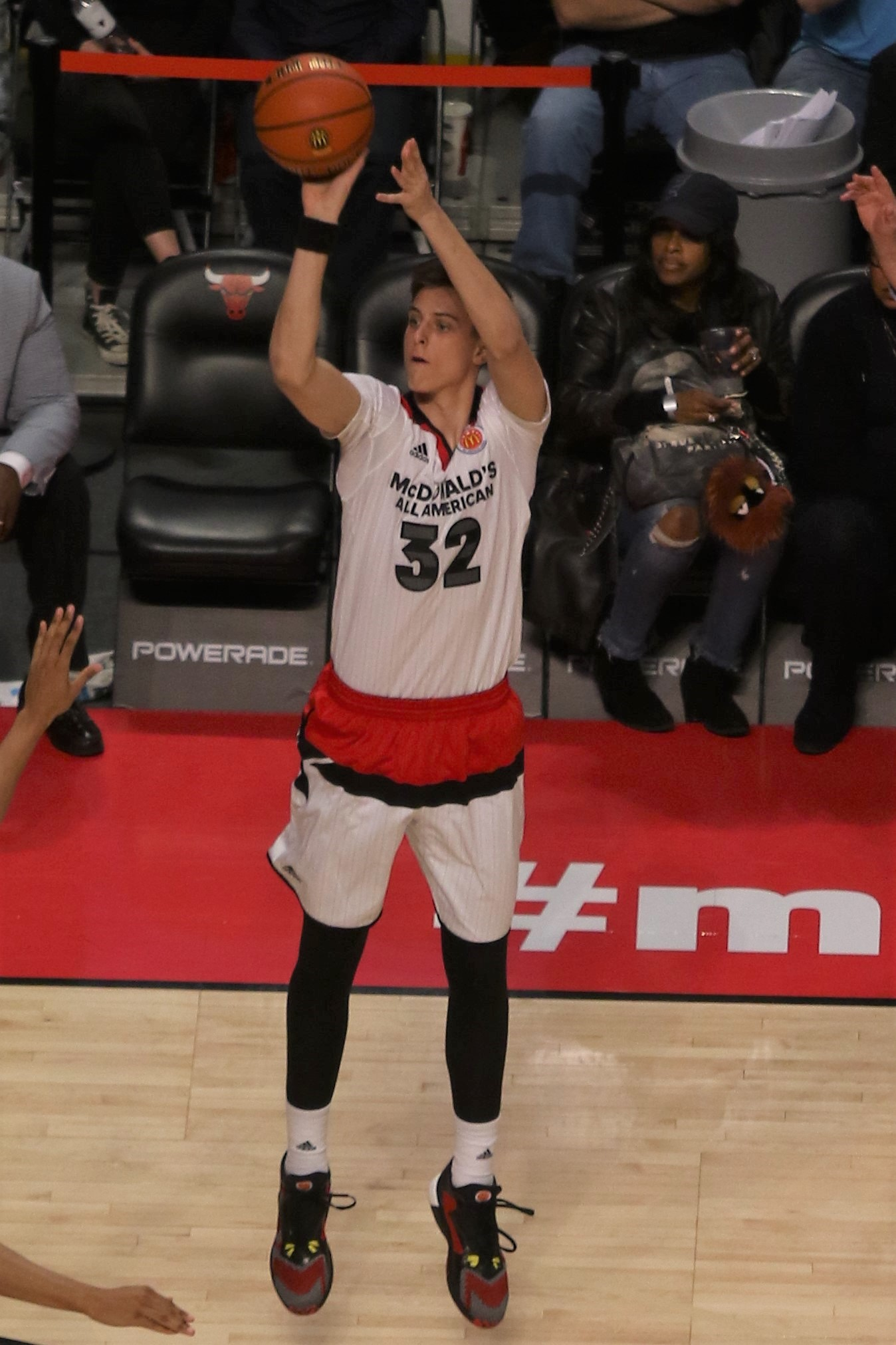
Zach Collins at the 2016 McDonald's All-American Game

=== Preseason poll ===
Rank	Team
1.	Gonzaga (7)
2.	Saint Mary's (3)
3.	BYU
4.	Pepperdine
5.	Santa Clara
6.	Loyola Marymount
7.	Pacific
8.	Portland
9.	San Francisco
10.	San Diego
(first place votes)

=== All-WCC Preseason Men's Basketball team ===
Recipient	School
Jared Brownridge	Santa Clara
Nick Emery	BYU
Przemek Karnowski	Gonzaga
Eric Mika	BYU
Lamond Murray Jr.	Pepperdine
Emmett Naar	Saint Mary’s
Josh Perkins	Gonzaga
Dane Pineau	Saint Mary’s
Joe Rahon	Saint Mary’s
Alec Wintering	Portland

== Rankings ==
Legend
	Improvement in ranking
	Drop in ranking
	Not ranked previous week
RV	Received votes but were not ranked in Top 25 of poll
(Italics)	Number of first place votes

		Pre/ Wk 1	Wk 2	Wk 3	Wk 4	Wk 5	Wk 6	Wk 7	Wk 8	Wk 9	Wk 10	Wk 11	Wk 12	Wk 13	Wk 14	Wk 15	Wk 16	Wk 17	Wk 18	Wk 19	Post
BYU	AP																				
BYU	C																				
Gonzaga	AP	14	14	11	8	8	8	7	7	5	5	4	3	1 (46)	1 (59)	1 (60)	1 (60)	4 (2)	4 (1)	2 (6)	
Gonzaga	C	13	14	11	8	8	8	7	6	4	5	4 (3)	3 (3)	1 (24)	1 (28)	1 (29)	1 (29)	4 (1)	4 (1)	2 (1)	2
Loyola Marymount	AP																				
Loyola Marymount	C																				
Pacific	AP																				
Pacific	C																				
Pepperdine	AP																				
Pepperdine	C																				
Portland	AP																				
Portland	C																				
Saint Mary's	AP	17	17	15	12	12	20	19	19	19	21	23	21	18	20	22	20	20	19	22	
Saint Mary's	C	19	17	15	13	11	20	19	19	19	21	23	21	19	20	21	18	18	19	21	NR
San Diego	AP																				
San Diego	C																				
San Francisco	AP																				
San Francisco	C																				
Santa Clara	AP																				
Santa Clara	C																				

== WCC regular season ==
=== Conference matrix ===
This table summarizes the head-to-head results between teams in conference play.

	BYU	Gonzaga	LMU	Pacific	Pepperdine	Portland	Saint Mary's	San Diego	San Francisco	Santa Clara
vs. Brigham Young	–	1–1	0–0	0–2	1–1	0–2	2–0	1–1	0–2	1–1
vs. Gonzaga	1–1	–	0–0	0–2	0–2	0–2	0–2	0–2	0–2	0–2
vs. Loyola Marymount	2–0	2–0	–	0–2	1–1	0–2	2–0	1–1	1–1	1–1
vs. Pacific	2–0	2–0	0–0	–	1–1	1–1	2–0	0–2	2–0	2–0
vs. Pepperdine	1–1	2–0	0–0	1–1	–	1–1	2–0	1–1	2–0	2–0
vs. Portland	2–0	2–0	0–0	1–1	1–1	–	2–0	2–0	2–0	2–0
vs. Saint Mary's	0–2	2–0	0–0	0–2	0–2	0–2	–	0–2	0–2	0–2
vs. San Diego	1–1	2–0	0–0	2–0	1–1	0–2	2–0	–	2–0	1–1
vs. San Francisco	2–0	2–0	0–0	0–2	0–2	0–2	2–0	0–2	–	1–1
vs. Santa Clara	1–1	2–0	0–0	0–2	0–2	0–2	2–0	1–1	1–1	–
Total	12–6	17–1	8–10	4–14	5–13	2–16	16–2	6–12	10–8	10–8

== All-WCC awards and teams ==
On February 28, the conference announced conference awards.

Honor	Recipient
Player of the Year	Nigel Williams-Goss, Gonzaga
Coach of the Year	Mark Few, Gonzaga
Newcomer of the Year	Joe Rahon, Saint Mary’s
Defensive Player of the Year	Nigel Williams-Goss, Gonzaga
All-WCC First Team	Jared Brownridge, Santa Clara
All-WCC First Team	T. J. Haws, BYU
All-WCC First Team	Calvin Hermanson, Saint Mary's
All-WCC First Team	Przemek Karnowski, Gonzaga
All-WCC First Team	Jock Landale, Saint Mary's
All-WCC First Team	Eric Mika, BYU
All-WCC First Team	Lamond Murray Jr., Pepperdine
All-WCC First Team	Joe Rahon, Saint Mary's
All-WCC First Team	Johnathan Williams, Gonzaga
All-WCC First Team	Nigel Williams-Goss, Gonzaga
All-WCC Second Team	Brett Bailey, San Diego
All-WCC Second Team	Ronnie Boyce III, San Francisco
All-WCC Second Team	Brandon Brown, Loyola Marymount
All-WCC Second Team	Zach Collins, Gonzaga
All-WCC Second Team	K. J. Feagin, Santa Clara
All-WCC Freshman Team	Yoeli Childs, BYU
All-WCC Freshman Team	Zach Collins, Gonzaga
All-WCC Freshman Team	T. J. Haws, BYU
All-WCC Freshman Team	Charles Minlend, San Francisco
All-WCC Freshman Team	Jordan Ratinho, San Francisco
All-WCC Honorable Mention	Olin Carter III, San Diego
All-WCC Honorable Mention	Jazz Johnson, Portland
All-WCC Honorable Mention	Nate Kratch, Santa Clara
All-WCC Honorable Mention	Jordan Mathews, Gonzaga
All-WCC Honorable Mention	Emmett Naar, Saint Mary’s
All-WCC Honorable Mention	Josh Perkins, Gonzaga
All-WCC Honorable Mention	Chris Reyes, Pepperdine
All-WCC Honorable Mention	Buay Tuach, Loyola Marymount
All-WCC Honorable Mention	T. J. Wallace, Pacific
All-WCC Honorable Mention	Alec Wintering, Portland

== Postseason ==
=== West Coast Conference tournament ===
Session	Game	Time*	Matchup	Score	Television
First round – Friday, March 3
1	1	6:00 PM	No. 8 Pepperdine vs. No. 9 Pacific	84–89	BYUtv
1	2	8:00 PM	No. 7 San Diego vs. No. 10 Portland	55–60	BYUtv
Quarterfinals – Saturday, March 4
2	3	1:00 PM	No. 3 BYU vs. No. 6 Loyola Marymount	89–81	BYUtv/RTRM/CSNBA
2	4	3:00 PM	No. 4 Santa Clara vs. No. 5 San Francisco	76–69	BYUtv/RTRM/CSNBA
3	5	7:00 PM	No. 1 Gonzaga vs. No. 9 Pacific	82–50	ESPN2
3	6	9:00 PM	No. 2 Saint Mary's vs. No. 10 Portland	81–58	ESPN2
Semifinals – Monday, March 6
4	7	6:00 PM	No. 1 Gonzaga vs No. 4 Santa Clara	77–68	ESPN
4	8	8:30 PM	No. 2 Saint Mary's vs No. 3 BYU	81–50	ESPN2
Championship – Tuesday, March 7
5	9	6:00 PM	No. 1 Gonzaga vs. No. 2 Saint Mary's	74–56	ESPN
*Game times in PT. Rankings denote tournament seeding.

=== NCAA tournament ===
The winner of the WCC tournament, Gonzaga, received the conference's automatic bid to the NCAA tournament. Saint Mary's received an at-large bid to the Tournament.

Seed	Region	School	First Four	First round	Second round	Sweet Sixteen	Elite Eight	Final Four	Championship
1	West	Gonzaga	N/A	defeated (16) South Dakota State 66–46	defeated (8) Northwestern 79–73	defeated (4) West Virginia 61–58	defeated (11) Xavier 83–59	defeated (7 E) South Carolina 77–73	eliminated by (1 S) North Carolina 65–71
7	West	Saint Mary's	N/A	defeated (10) VCU 85–77	eliminated by (2) Arizona 60–69				
		W–L (%):	0–0 (–)	2–0 (1.000)	1–1 (.500)	1–0 (1.000)	1–0 (1.000)	1–0 (1.000)	0–1 (.000) Total: 6–2 (.750)

== See also ==
- 2016–17 NCAA Division I men's basketball season
- West Coast Conference men's basketball tournament
- 2016–17 West Coast Conference women's basketball season
- West Coast Conference women's basketball tournament
- 2017 West Coast Conference women's basketball tournament
