= 2016–17 Pacific Tigers men's basketball team =

American college basketball season

2016–17 Pacific Tigers men's basketball
- Conference: West Coast Conference
- Record: 11–22 (4–14 WCC)
- Head coach: Damon Stoudamire (1st season)
- Assistant coaches: Leonard Perry; Luke Wicks; JayDee Luster
- Home arena: Alex G. Spanos Center

2016–17 West Coast Conference men's basketball standings
	Conf.				Overall
Team	W		L	PCT	W		L	PCT
No. 2 Gonzaga †	17	–	1	.944	37	–	2	.949
No. 22 Saint Mary's	16	–	2	.889	29	–	5	.853
BYU	12	–	6	.667	22	–	12	.647
San Francisco	10	–	8	.556	20	–	13	.606
Santa Clara	10	–	8	.556	17	–	16	.515
Loyola Marymount	8	–	10	.444	15	–	15	.500
San Diego	6	–	12	.333	13	–	18	.419
Pepperdine	5	–	13	.278	9	–	22	.290
Pacific	4	–	14	.222	11	–	22	.333
Portland	2	–	16	.111	11	–	22	.333
† Conference tournament winner Rankings from AP poll

The 2016–17 Pacific Tigers men's basketball team represented the University of the Pacific during the 2016–17 NCAA Division I men's basketball season. They played their home games at the Alex G. Spanos Center as members of the West Coast Conference. The Tigers were led by first-year head coach Damon Stoudamire. They finished the season 11–22, 4–14 in WCC play to finish in ninth place. They defeated Pepperdine in the first round of the WCC tournament to advance to the quarterfinals where they lost to Gonzaga.

== Previous season ==
The Tigers finished the season 8–20, 6–12 in WCC play to finish in a three way tie for seventh place. On December 12, 2015, head coach Ron Verlin was suspended indefinitely amid an NCAA investigation. Assistant coach Mike Burns was named the interim head coach for the remainder of the season. The Tigers also self-imposed a postseason ban for 2016 which included the WCC Tournament.

On March 3, 2016, it was announced that Ron Verlin was no longer employed by the university. Interim coach Mike Burns was also released from his employment with the school.

On March 16, the school announced that Damon Stoudamire would be the new head coach.

== Departures ==
Name	Number	Pos.	Height	Weight	Year	Hometown	Notes
Alec Kobre	3	G	6'2"	185	Senior	Santa Rosa, CA	Graduated
Rolaun Dunham	10	G	6'1"	195	RS Sophomore	Riverbank, CA	Walk-on; Transferred
Eric Thompson	12	F	6'8"	240	Senior	Detroit, MI	Graduated

=== Incoming transfers ===
Name	Number	Pos.	Height	Weight	Year	Hometown	Previous School
Kendall Small	1	G	6'0"	175	Sophomore	Anaheim, CA	Transferred from Oregon. Under NCAA transfer rules, Small will have to sit out for the 2016–17 season. Will have three years of remaining eligibility.
Miles Reynolds	3	G	6'2"	170	Junior	Chicago, IL	Transferred from Saint Louis. Under NCAA transfer rules, Reynolds will have to sit out for the 2016–17 season. Will have two years of remaining eligibility.
TySean Powell	25	F	6'6"	215	Junior	Twinsburg, OH	Transferred from Duquesne. Under NCAA transfer rules, Reynolds will have to sit out for the 2016–17 season. Will have two years of remaining eligibility.

== Recruiting Class of 2016 ==
College recruiting information
Name	Hometown	School	Height	Weight	Commit date
K.J. Smith #108 PG	Thousand Oaks, CA	IMG Academy	6 ft 1 in (1.85 m)	150 lb (68 kg)	
K.J. Smith #108 PG	Recruit ratings: Scout: Rivals: (63)				
Keshon Montague; PG	Brampton, ON	Mounatain Mission	6 ft 0 in (1.83 m)	170 lb (77 kg)	
Keshon Montague; PG	Recruit ratings: Scout: Rivals: (nr)				
Overall recruit ranking: Scout: 98 Rivals: nr ESPN: nr
Note: In many cases, Scout, Rivals, 247Sports, On3, and ESPN may conflict in their listings of height and weight.; In these cases, the average was taken. ESPN grades are on a 100-point scale.; Sources: "Pacific 2016 Basketball Commitments". Rivals.; "2016 Pacific Basketball Commits". Scout.; "ESPN". ESPN.; "Scout.com Team Recruiting Rankings". Scout.; "2016 Team Ranking". Rivals.

== Roster ==
2016–17 Pacific Tigers men's basketball team
Players
Coaches

Pos.	#	Name	Height	Weight	Year	Previous school	Hometown
G	0	Maleke Haynes	5 ft 10 in (1.78 m)	160 lb (73 kg)	Jr	El Camino Real; Saddleback College	Reseda, CA
G	1	Kendall Small (I) (redshirt)	6 ft 0 in (1.83 m)	182 lb (83 kg)	So	Mayfair; Oregon	Lakewood, CA
G	2	T. J. Wallace	6 ft 3 in (1.91 m)	215 lb (98 kg)	Sr	Modesto Christian	Stockton, CA
G	3	Miles Reynolds (I) (redshirt)	6 ft 2 in (1.88 m)	170 lb (77 kg)	Jr	Whitney Young; Saint Louis	Chicago, IL
F	4	Tonko Vuko	6 ft 8 in (2.03 m)	230 lb (104 kg)	Sr	Jezicna Gimnazija Split; Weatherford College	Split, Croatia
F	5	Anthony Townes	6 ft 6 in (1.98 m)	215 lb (98 kg)	So	Modesto Christian	Modesto, CA
G	10	Keshon Montague	6 ft 0 in (1.83 m)	170 lb (77 kg)	Fr	Mountain Mission	Brampton, ON
F	11	Jack Williams	6 ft 8 in (2.03 m)	220 lb (100 kg)	RS So	Chaminade; Long Beach State	Porter Ranch, CA
G	14	Max Tinsley (W)	6 ft 2 in (1.88 m)	170 lb (77 kg)	So	Chaminade Prep	Porter Ranch, CA
G	15	D. J. Ursery	6 ft 4 in (1.93 m)	195 lb (88 kg)	Jr	Crespi Carmelite	Los Angeles, CA
G	20	Jason Braden	6 ft 0 in (1.83 m)	160 lb (73 kg)	RS So	Berean Christian	Los Angeles, CA
F	21	Jacob Lampkin	6 ft 9 in (2.06 m)	235 lb (107 kg)	Jr	O'Dea	Bellevue, WA
G/F	22	Ray Bowles	6 ft 5 in (1.96 m)	215 lb (98 kg)	RS Jr	Modesto Christian	Modesto, CA
F	24	David Taylor	6 ft 3 in (1.91 m)	190 lb (86 kg)	Sr	Graf-Münster-Gymnasium	Eclersdorf, Germany
F	25	TySean Powell (I) (redshirt)	6 ft 8 in (2.03 m)	215 lb (98 kg)	Jr	IMG Academy; Duquesne	Twinsburg, OH
G	30	K. J. Smith	6 ft 2 in (1.88 m)	160 lb (73 kg)	Fr	IMG Academy	Thousand Oaks, CA
F	33	Ilias Theodorou	6 ft 7 in (2.01 m)	215 lb (98 kg)	Jr	St. John's NW Military Acad.	Athens, Greece
C	35	Sami Eleraky	7 ft 0 in (2.13 m)	260 lb (118 kg)	Sr	Tech College Aalborg; City College of San Francisco	Aalborg, Denmark

Head coach

- Damon Stoudamire (Arizona)

Assistant coach(es)

- Leonard Perry (Idaho)
- Luke Wicks (Northern State)
- JayDee Luster (Wyoming)

Legend

- (C) Team captain
- (S) Suspended
- (I) Ineligible
- (W) Walk-on
- Injured
- Current redshirt

Roster

== Schedule and results ==
Date time, TV	Rank^{#}	Opponent^{#}	Result	Record	Site (attendance) city, state
Exhibition
11/04/2015*; 7:00 pm		Bristol (CA)	W 106–39		Alex G. Spanos Center; Stockton, CA
Non-conference regular season
11/11/2016*; 6:00 pm, P12N		at No. 16 UCLA	L 80–119	0–1	Pauley Pavilion (8,743); Los Angeles, CA
11/14/2016*; 11:00 pm, ESPN2		Green Bay; College Hoops Tip-Off Marathon	W 76–58	1–1	Alex G. Spanos Center (1,716); Stockton, CA
11/19/2016*; 7:00 pm		at UC Irvine	L 65–72	1–2	Bren Events Center (1,678); Irvine, CA
11/22/2016*; 7:00 pm		Wyoming	W 73–65	2–2	Alex G. Spanos Center (1,730); Stockton, CA
11/29/2016*; 7:00 pm		at Nevada	L 67–77	2–3	Lawlor Events Center (6,920); Reno, NV
12/01/2016*; 7:00 pm		Sacramento State	W 74–58	3–3	Alex G. Spanos Center (2,094); Stockton, CA
12/03/2016*; 6:00 pm		at Cal State Fullerton	L 77–78	3–4	Titan Gym (614); Fullerton, CA
12/08/2016*; 4:00 pm		at Massachusetts; Gotham Classic	L 48–72	3–5	Mullins Center (3,171); Amherst, MA
12/10/2016*; 7:30 pm		Rider; Gotham Classic	L 66–73	3–6	Stockton Arena (1,967); Stockton, CA
12/15/2016*; 7:00 pm		North Carolina A&T; Gotham Classic	W 66–57	4–6	Alex G. Spanos Center (1,347); Stockton, CA
12/17/2016*; 7:00 pm		Fresno State	L 68–70 ^{OT}	4–7	Alex G. Spanos Center (2,051); Stockton, CA
12/20/2016*; 7:00 pm		Kennesaw State; Gotham Classic	W 69–56	5–7	Alex G. Spanos Center (1,355); Stockton, CA
12/23/2016*; 2:00 pm		Pacific Union	W 102–54	6–7	Alex G. Spanos Center (1,342); Stockton, CA
WCC regular season
12/29/2016; 7:00 pm		Portland	L 76–80	6–8 (0–1)	Alex G. Spanos Center (1,622); Stockton, CA
12/31/2016; 5:00 pm, RTNW		No. 7 Gonzaga	L 61–81	6–9 (0–2)	Alex G. Spanos Center (2,859); Stockton, CA
01/05/2017; 7:00 pm		at San Diego	W 56–53	7–9 (1–2)	Jenny Craig Pavilion (1,207); San Diego, CA
01/07/2017; 6:00 pm, BYUtv		at BYU	L 62–91	7–10 (1–3)	Marriott Center (13,677); Provo, UT
01/12/2017; 7:00 pm		Pepperdine	W 79–74	8–10 (2–3)	Alex G. Spanos Center (1,669); Stockton, CA
01/14/2017; 7:00 pm, CSNBA		at San Francisco	L 51–72	8–11 (2–4)	War Memorial Gymnasium (1,410); San Francisco, CA
01/19/2017; 8:00 pm		at No. 23 Saint Mary's	L 50–62	8–12 (2–5)	McKeon Pavilion (2,989); Moraga, CA
01/21/2017; 3:00 pm, CSNBA		BYU	L 47–62	8–13 (2–6)	Alex G. Spanos Center (4,311); Stockton, CA
01/26/2017; 7:00 pm		at Loyola Marymount	L 73–79	8–14 (2–7)	Gersten Pavilion (1,620); Los Angeles, CA
01/28/2017; 1:00 pm, SPCSN		San Francisco	L 60–81	8–15 (2–8)	Alex G. Spanos Center (2,004); Stockton, CA
02/02/2017; 8:00 pm, ESPNU		No. 18 Saint Mary's	L 70–74	8–16 (2–9)	Alex G. Spanos Center (2,401); Stockton, CA
02/04/2017; 5:00 pm		at Pepperdine	L 72–82	8–17 (2–10)	Firestone Fieldhouse (1,103); Malibu, CA
02/09/2017; 7:00 pm		San Diego	W 61–58	9–17 (3–10)	Alex G. Spanos Center (1,536); Stockton, CA
02/11/2017; 7:00 pm		Santa Clara	L 47–64	9–18 (3–11)	Alex G. Spanos Center (3,620); Stockton, CA
02/16/2017; 7:00 pm		at Portland	W 76–65	10–18 (4–11)	Chiles Center (2,023); Portland, OR
02/18/2017; 1:00 pm, SPCSN/RTNW		at No. 1 Gonzaga	W 82–61	10–19 (4–12)	McCarthey Athletic Center (6,000); Spokane, WA
02/23/2017; 7:00 pm		at Santa Clara	L 68–69	10–20 (4–13)	Leavey Center (1,792); Santa Clara, CA
02/25/2017; 7:00 pm		Loyola Marymount	L 66–67	10–21 (4–14)	Alex G. Spanos Center (2,819); Stockton, CA
WCC tournament
03/03/2017; 6:00 pm, BYUtv	(9)	vs. (8) Pepperdine; First round	W 89–84	11–21	Orleans Arena (7,484); Paradise, NV
03/04/2017; 7:00 pm, ESPN2	(9)	vs. (1) No. 4 Gonzaga; Quarterfinals	L 50–82	11–22	Orleans Arena (7,315); Paradise, NV
*Non-conference game. ^{#}Rankings from AP Poll. (#) Tournament seedings in parentheses. All times are in Pacific Time Source.
