= 2016–17 BYU Cougars men's basketball team =

American college basketball season

2016–17 BYU Cougars men's basketball

NIT, First round
- Conference: West Coast Conference
- Record: 0–10 (22 wins, 1 loss vacated)* (0-6 (12 wins vacated)* WCC)
- Head coach: Dave Rose (12th season)
- Assistant coaches: Tim LaComb (7th season); Terry Nashif (10th season); Quincy Lewis (2nd season)
- Home arena: Marriott Center

2016–17 West Coast Conference men's basketball standings
	Conf.				Overall
Team	W		L	PCT	W		L	PCT
No. 2 Gonzaga †	17	–	1	.944	37	–	2	.949
No. 22 Saint Mary's	16	–	2	.889	29	–	5	.853
BYU	12	–	6	.667	22	–	12	.647
San Francisco	10	–	8	.556	20	–	13	.606
Santa Clara	10	–	8	.556	17	–	16	.515
Loyola Marymount	8	–	10	.444	15	–	15	.500
San Diego	6	–	12	.333	13	–	18	.419
Pepperdine	5	–	13	.278	9	–	22	.290
Pacific	4	–	14	.222	11	–	22	.333
Portland	2	–	16	.111	11	–	22	.333
† Conference tournament winner Rankings from AP poll

The 2016–17 BYU Cougars men's basketball team represented Brigham Young University in the 2016–17 NCAA Division I men's basketball season. It was head coach Dave Rose's twelfth season at BYU and the Cougars sixth season in the West Coast Conference. The Cougars played their home games at the Marriott Center in Provo, Utah. They finished the season 22–12, 12–6 in WCC play to finish in third place. They defeated Loyola Marymount in the quarterfinals of the WCC tournament to advance to the semifinals where they lost to Saint Mary's. They were invited to the National Invitation Tournament where they lost in the first round to Texas–Arlington.

As a result of a scandal surrounding inappropriate benefits received by BYU starting guard Nick Emery from a BYU booster, the NCAA vacated all of BYU's wins for the 2015–16 and 2016–17 seasons with the exception of a 2015 win over Weber State in which Nick Emery did not play.

== Before the season ==
=== Departures ===
Name	Number	Pos.	Height	Weight	Year	Hometown	Notes
Chase Fischer	1	G	6'3"	190	RS Senior	Ripley, WV	Graduated
Zac Seljaas	2	F	6'7"	215	Freshman	Bountiful, UT	LDS mission (returning in 2018)
Kyle Collinsworth	5	G	6'6"	215	Senior	Provo, UT	Graduated/joined Texas Legends in the NBA G League
Jake Toolson	15	G	6'5"	205	Sophomore	Gilbert, AZ	Transferred to Utah Valley
Jordan Chatman	25	G	6'5"	195	RS Freshman	Vancouver, WA	Transferred to Boston College
Nate Austin	33	F	6'11"	245	RS Senior	Alpine, UT	Walk-on; graduated
Jakob Hartsock	34	F	6'8"	205	Freshman	Bartlesville, OK	Left the team for personal reasons

=== Incoming transfers ===
Name	Number	Pos.	Height	Weight	Year	Hometown	Previous School
L. J. Rose	5	G	6'3"	200	Senior	Houston, TX	Transferred from Houston. Was immediately eligible to play since he graduated from Houston.

== Recruiting Class of 2016 ==
College recruiting information (2016)
Name	Hometown	School	Height	Weight	Commit date
Yoeli Childs #13 PF	South Jordan, UT	Bingham High School	6 ft 6 in (1.98 m)	225 lb (102 kg)	Sep 12, 2015
Yoeli Childs #13 PF	Recruit ratings: Scout: Rivals: 247Sports: (85)				
Steven Beo; SG	Richland, WA	Timpview High School	6 ft 2 in (1.88 m)	180 lb (82 kg)	Mar 31, 2015
Steven Beo; SG	Recruit ratings: Scout: Rivals: 247Sports: (NR)				
Colby Leifson; SG	Atlanta, GA	North Gwinnett High School	6 ft 4 in (1.93 m)	188 lb (85 kg)	Aug 2, 2016
Colby Leifson; SG	Recruit ratings: Scout: Rivals: 247Sports: (NR)				
Overall recruit ranking: Scout: nr Rivals: nr 247Sports: 109 ESPN: nr
Note: In many cases, Scout, Rivals, 247Sports, On3, and ESPN may conflict in their listings of height and weight.; In these cases, the average was taken. ESPN grades are on a 100-point scale.; Sources: "BYU 2016 Basketball Commitments". Rivals.; "2016 BYU Basketball Commits". Scout.; "ESPN". ESPN.; "Scout.com Team Recruiting Rankings". Scout.; "2016 Team Ranking". Rivals.; "2016 BYU Basketball Commits". 247Sports.

== Recruiting class of 2017 ==
College recruiting information (2017)
Name	Hometown	School	Height	Weight	Commit date
Kolby Lee #20 C	Meridian, ID	Rocky Mountain High School	6 ft 9 in (2.06 m)	260 lb (120 kg)	Aug 3, 2016
Kolby Lee #20 C	Recruit ratings: Scout: Rivals: 247Sports: (81)				
Christian PoPoola Jr. #46 SG	Las Vegas, NV	Bishop Gorman High School	6 ft 4 in (1.93 m)	190 lb (86 kg)	Aug 3, 2016
Christian PoPoola Jr. #46 SG	Recruit ratings: Scout: Rivals: 247Sports: (78)				
Overall recruit ranking: Scout: nr Rivals: nr 247Sports: 109 ESPN: nr
Note: In many cases, Scout, Rivals, 247Sports, On3, and ESPN may conflict in their listings of height and weight.; In these cases, the average was taken. ESPN grades are on a 100-point scale.; Sources: "BYU 2017 Basketball Commitments". Rivals.; "2017 BYU Basketball Commits". Scout.; "ESPN". ESPN.; "Scout.com Team Recruiting Rankings". Scout.; "2017 Team Ranking". Rivals.; "2017 BYU Basketball Commits". 247Sports.

=== 2016–17 returned missionaries ===
BYU debuted two returned missionaries for the 2016–17 season: Payton Dastrup and T. J. Haws.

College recruiting information (2014)
Name	Hometown	School	Height	Weight	Commit date
Payton Dastrup; C	Mesa, Arizona	Mountain View	6 ft 10 in (2.08 m)	230 lb (100 kg)	Nov 13, 2013
Payton Dastrup; C	Recruit ratings: Scout: Rivals: (80)				
T. J. Haws; G	Highland, Utah	Lone Peak	6 ft 3 in (1.91 m)	170 lb (77 kg)	Aug 29, 2011
T. J. Haws; G	Recruit ratings: Scout: Rivals: (86)				
Overall recruit ranking: Scout: 22 Rivals: 17 ESPN: 22
Note: In many cases, Scout, Rivals, 247Sports, On3, and ESPN may conflict in their listings of height and weight.; In these cases, the average was taken. ESPN grades are on a 100-point scale.; Sources: "BYU 2014 Basketball Commitments". Rivals.; "2014 BYU Basketball Commits". Scout.; "ESPN". ESPN.; "Scout.com Team Recruiting Rankings". Scout.; "2014 Team Ranking". Rivals.

BYU also saw the return of one familiar face who came to school for one season before serving his mission: Eric Mika.

College recruiting information (2013)
Name	Hometown	School	Height	Weight	Commit date
Eric Mika; F	Alpine, Utah	Lone Peak	6 ft 9 in (2.06 m)	220 lb (100 kg)	Dec 17, 2011
Eric Mika; F	Recruit ratings: Scout: Rivals: (84)				
Overall recruit ranking: Scout: 22 Rivals: 17 ESPN: 22
Note: In many cases, Scout, Rivals, 247Sports, On3, and ESPN may conflict in their listings of height and weight.; In these cases, the average was taken. ESPN grades are on a 100-point scale.; Sources: "BYU 2013 Basketball Commitments". Rivals.; "2013 BYU Basketball Commits". Scout.; "ESPN". ESPN.; "Scout.com Team Recruiting Rankings". Scout.; "2013 Team Ranking". Rivals.

== 2016–17 media ==
=== Nu Skin Cougar IMG Sports Network ===
KSL 102.7 FM and 1160 AM- Flagship Station (Salt Lake City/ Provo, UT and ksl.com)
BYU Radio- Nationwide (Dish Network 980, Sirius XM 143, and byuradio.org)
KTHK- Blackfoot/ Idaho Falls/ Pocatello/ Rexburg, ID
KMGR- Manti, UT
KSUB- Cedar City, UT
KDXU- St. George, UT

== Roster ==
(Subject to change)

2016–17 BYU Cougars men's basketball team
Players
Coaches

Pos.	#	Name	Height	Weight	Year	Previous school	Hometown
G	2	Zach Frampton (W)	6 ft 3 in (1.91 m)	185 lb (84 kg)	Fr	Lone Peak	Alpine, UT
G	3	Elijah Bryant	6 ft 5 in (1.96 m)	210 lb (95 kg)	RS So	New Hampton School; Elon	Gwinnett, GA
G	4	Nick Emery (C)	6 ft 2 in (1.88 m)	185 lb (84 kg)	So	Lone Peak	Alpine, UT
G	5	L. J. Rose (injured) (C)	6 ft 3 in (1.91 m)	200 lb (91 kg)	Sr	Westbury Christian; Houston	Houston, TX
F	12	Eric Mika	6 ft 10 in (2.08 m)	230 lb (104 kg)	So	Lone Peak	Alpine, UT
G	13	Colby Leifson	6 ft 4 in (1.93 m)	190 lb (86 kg)	Fr	North Gwinnett	Suwanee, GA
G	14	Steven Beo	6 ft 3 in (1.91 m)	180 lb (82 kg)	Fr	Richland	Richland, WA
C	15	Payton Dastrup	6 ft 10 in (2.08 m)	250 lb (113 kg)	Fr	Mountain View	Mesa, AZ
F	21	Kyle Davis (injured) (C)	6 ft 8 in (2.03 m)	225 lb (102 kg)	RS Sr	Alta; Southern Utah; Utah State	Draper, UT
F	23	Yoeli Childs	6 ft 8 in (2.03 m)	225 lb (102 kg)	Fr	Bingham	South Jordan, UT
G	30	T. J. Haws	6 ft 4 in (1.93 m)	170 lb (77 kg)	Fr	Lone Peak	Alpine, UT
F	31	Braiden Shaw	6 ft 9 in (2.06 m)	210 lb (95 kg)	So	Eagle	Eagle, ID
F	40	Jamal Aytes	6 ft 6 in (1.98 m)	235 lb (107 kg)	RS Jr	JSerra; UNLV	San Diego, CA
C	44	Corbin Kaufusi (W)	6 ft 10 in (2.08 m)	255 lb (116 kg)	Jr	Timpview	Provo, UT

Head coach

- Dave Rose (Houston)

Assistant coach(es)

- Tim LaComb- Assoc. Head Coach (Utah)
- Terry Nashif (BYU)
- Quincy Lewis (Wagner)

Legend

- (C) Team captain
- (S) Suspended
- (I) Ineligible
- (W) Walk-on
- Injured
- Current redshirt

== Schedule ==
* Next to a score indicates a win that was forfeited due to NCAA-imposed sanctions.

Date time, TV	Rank^{#}	Opponent^{#}	Result	Record	Site city, state
Exhibition
10/29/2016*; 7:00 pm, BYUtv		Seattle Pacific	W 102–82		Marriott Center; Provo, UT
11/09/2016*; 7:00 pm, BYUtv		BYU–Hawai'i	W 110–63		Marriott Center; Provo, UT
Non-conference regular season
11/14/2016*; 8:00 pm, ESPN2		Princeton; College Hoops Tip-Off Marathon	W 82–73*	1–0	Marriott Center; Provo, UT
11/17/2016*; 7:00 pm, BYUtv		Coppin State; Men Who Speak Up Main Event	W 96–59*	2–0	Marriott Center; Provo, UT
11/19/2016*; 7:30 pm, BYUtv		Coastal Carolina; Men Who Speak Up Main Event	W 81–65*	3–0	Marriott Center; Provo, UT
11/21/2016*; 7:30 pm, YouTube		vs. Saint Louis; Men Who Speak Up Main Event semifinals	W 92–62*	4–0	MGM Grand Garden Arena; Paradise, NV
11/23/2016*; 10:00 pm, ESPN2		vs. Valparaiso; Men Who Speak Up Main Event finals	L 89–92	4–1	MGM Grand Garden Arena; Paradise, NV
11/26/2016*; 4:00 pm, TheW.tv		Utah Valley; Old Oquirrh Bucket/UCCU Crosstown Clash	L 101–114	4–2	Marriott Center; Provo, UT
11/30/2016*; 8:15 pm, BYUtv		vs. Utah State; Old Oquirrh Bucket	W 77–63*	5–2	Vivint Smart Home Arena; Salt Lake City, UT
12/03/2016*; 6:00 pm, ESPNU		vs. USC; Hoophall LA	L 84–91	5–3	Staples Center; Los Angeles, CA
12/07/2016*; 7:00 pm, BYUtv		Weber State; Old Oquirrh Bucket	W 77–66*	6–3	Marriott Center; Provo, UT
12/10/2016*; 8:00 pm, ESPN2		Colorado	W 79–71*	7–3	Marriott Center; Provo, UT
12/17/2016*; 7:30 pm, BTN		vs. Illinois; State Farm Chicago Legends	L 73–75	7–4	United Center; Chicago, IL
12/20/2016*; 7:00 pm, BYUtv		Idaho State	W 84–58*	8–4	Marriott Center; Provo, UT
12/22/2016*; 7:00 pm, BYUtv		Cal State Bakersfield	W 81–71*	9–4	Marriott Center; Provo, UT
WCC Regular Season
12/29/2016; 7:00 pm, BYUtv		Santa Clara	W 89–59*	10–4 (1–0)	Marriott Center; Provo, UT
12/31/2016; 2:00 pm, RTRM		at Loyola Marymount	W 81–76*	11–4 (2–0)	Gersten Pavilion; Los Angeles, CA
01/05/2017; 9:00 pm, ESPNU		at No. 19 Saint Mary's	L 68–81	11–5 (2–1)	McKeon Pavilion; Moraga, CA
01/07/2017; 7:00 pm, BYUtv		Pacific	W 91–62*	12–5 (3–1)	Marriott Center; Provo, UT
01/12/2017; 7:00 pm, BYUtv		San Francisco	W 85–75*	13–5 (4–1)	Marriott Center; Provo, UT
01/14/2017; 8:00 pm, SPEC; TheW.tv		at San Diego	L 75–88	13–6 (4–2)	Jenny Craig Pavilion; San Diego, CA
01/19/2017; 7:00 pm, BYUtv		Pepperdine	W 99–70*	14–6 (5–2)	Marriott Center; Provo, UT
01/21/2017; 4:00 pm, RTRM		at Pacific	W 62–47*	15–6 (6–2)	Alex G. Spanos Center; Stockton, CA
01/26/2017; 9:00 pm, ESPNU		at Santa Clara	L 68–76	15–7 (6–3)	Leavey Center; Santa Clara, CA
01/28/2017; 7:00 pm, BYUtv		Loyola Marymount	W 85–77*	16–7 (7–3)	Marriott Center; Provo, UT
02/02/2017; 9:00 pm, ESPN2		No. 1 Gonzaga; Rivalry	L 75–85	16–8 (7–4)	Marriott Center; Provo, UT
02/04/2017; 7:00 pm, BYUtv		Portland	W 73–62*	17–8 (8–4)	Marriott Center; Provo, UT
02/09/2017; 9:00 pm, ESPNU		at Pepperdine	L 83–99	17–9 (8–5)	Firestone Fieldhouse; Malibu, CA
02/11/2017; 9:00 pm, RTRM		at San Francisco	W 68–52*	18–9 (9–5)	War Memorial Gymnasium; San Francisco, CA
02/16/2017; 9:00 pm, ESPNU		San Diego	W 82–70*	19–9 (10–5)	Marriott Center; Provo, UT
02/18/2017; 8:00 pm, ESPN2		No. 22 Saint Mary's	L 57–70	19–10 (10–6)	Marriott Center; Provo, UT
02/23/2017; 8:00 pm, RTRM		at Portland	W 97–78*	20–10 (11–6)	Chiles Center; Portland, OR
02/25/2017; 8:00 pm, ESPN		at No. 1 Gonzaga; Rivalry	W 79–71*	21–10 (12–6)	McCarthey Athletic Center; Spokane, WA
WCC Tournament
03/04/2017; 2:00 pm, BYUtv/RTRM	(3)	vs. (6) Loyola Marymount; Quarterfinals	W 89–81*	22–10	Orleans Arena; Paradise, NV
03/06/2017; 9:30 pm, ESPN2	(3)	vs. (2) No. 19 Saint Mary's; Semifinals	L 50–81	22–11	Orleans Arena; Paradise, NV
NIT
03/15/2017*; 7:00 pm, ESPN2	(3)	(6) Texas–Arlington; First round – California Bracket	L 89–105	22–12	Marriott Center; Provo, UT
*Non-conference game. ^{#}Rankings from AP Poll / Coaches' Poll. (#) Tournament seedings in parentheses. All times are in Mountain.

== Game summaries ==
=== Papa John's Cougar Tipoff ===
Broadcasters: Spencer Linton & Jarom Jordan
Starting Lineups:

- BYU White: Nick Emery, Kyle Davis, Yolei Childs, Davin Guinn, TJ Haws
- BYU Blue: Zach Frampton, Colby Leifson, Steven Beo, Payton Dastrup, Jamal Aytes

byutv.org

Oct 26
7:05 p.m. MDT

Recap

BYU White 80, BYU Blue 77
Scoring by half: 33–40, 47–37
Pts: Yolei Childs 21; Rebs: Yolei Childs 14; Asts: TJ Haws 7	Pts: Colby Leifson 24; Rebs: Jamal Aytes 7 Asts: Steven Beo 5

Marriott Center
Provo, UT
Attendance: N/A
Referees: Not Listed

=== Exhibition: Seattle Pacific ===
Broadcasters: Dave McCann, Blaine Fowler, & Spencer Linton
Starting Lineups:

- Seattle Pacific: Coleman Wooten, Sam Simpson, Will Parker, Joe Rasmussen, Olivier-Paul Betu
- BYU: Nick Emery, Eric Mika, Kyle Davis, Davin Guinn, TJ Haws

BYUtv

Oct 29
7:05 p.m. MDT

Recap

Seattle Pacific Falcons 82, BYU Cougars 102
Scoring by half: 46–55, 36-47
Pts: Tony Miller 28; Rebs: Tony Miller 9 Asts: Will Parker, Olivier-Paul Betu 3	Pts: Eric Mika 23; Rebs: Eric Mika 12; Asts: TJ Haws 10

Marriott Center
Provo, UT
Attendance: N/A
Referees: Casey McClellan, Ryan Holmes, Sam Haddad

=== Exhibition: BYU–Hawai'i ===
Broadcasters: Dave McCann, Blaine Fowler & Spencer Linton
Starting Lineups:

- BYU-Hawaii: Tanner Nelson, Denhym Brooke, D McCleary, Gabriel Andrade, Caleb Roney
- BYU: Nick Emery, L.J. Rose, Eric Mika, Kyle Davis, TJ Haws

BYUtv

Nov 9
7:05 p.m. MST

Recap

BYU–Hawai'i Seasiders 63, BYU Cougars 110
Scoring by half: 35–53, 28–57
Pts: Tanner Nelson 17; Rebs: Tanner Nelson 7 Asts: Tanner Nelson, D McCleary 3	Pts: Kyle Davis 16; Rebs: Yolei Childs 10; Asts: L.J. Rose 10

Marriott Center
Provo, UT
Attendance: 12,485
Referees: Ryan Holmes, Michael Rapp, Scott DeBo

=== Princeton ===
Broadcasters: Sam Farber & Brad Daugherty
Series History: BYU leads series 4–0
Starting Lineups:

- Princeton: Amir Bell, Spencer Weisz, Henry Caruso, Steven Cook, Hans Brase
- BYU: Nick Emery, L.J. Rose, Eric Mika, Kyle Davis, TJ Haws

ESPN2

Nov 14
8:01 p.m. MST

Recap

Princeton Tigers 73, BYU Cougars 82
Scoring by half: 35–44, 38–38
Pts: Devin Cannady 18; Rebs: Spencer Weisz 8 Asts: Spencer Weisz 4	Pts: Eric Mika 26; Rebs: Eric Mika 18; Asts: Nick Emery 4

Marriott Center
Provo, UT
Attendance: 15,926
Referees: Michael Irving, Gregory Nixon, Jimmy Casas

=== Coppin State ===
Broadcasters: Dave McCann, Steve Cleveland, & Spencer Linton
Series History: First Meeting
Starting Lineups:

- Coppin State: Josh Treadwell, Blake Simpson, Keith Shivers, Joseph Gripper, Terry Harris
- BYU: Nick Emery, L.J. Rose, Eric Mika, Kyle Davis, TJ Haws

BYUtv

Nov 17
7:05 p.m. MST

Recap

Coppin State Eagles 59, BYU Cougars 96
Scoring by half: 32–48, 27–48
Pts: Dejuan Clayton 11; Rebs: Terry Harris 9 Asts: Dejuan Clayton 4	Pts: Eric Mika 18; Rebs: Yolei Childs 15; Asts: L.J. Rose 5

Marriott Center
Provo, UT
Attendance: 12,444
Referees: Frank Harvey III, Kelly Porter, Jim Schipper

=== Coastal Carolina ===
Broadcasters: Dave McCann, Blaine Fowler, & Spencer Linton
Series History: First Meeting
Starting Lineups:

- Coastal Carolina: Joseph Williams-Powell, Jaylen Shaw, Elijah Wilson, Josh Coleman, Colton Ray-St Cyr
- BYU: Nick Emery, L.J. Rose, Eric Mika, Kyle Davis, TJ Haws

BYUtv

Nov 19
7:35 p.m. MST

Recap

Coastal Carolina Chanticleers 65, BYU Cougars 81
Scoring by half: 25–40, 40-41
Pts: Joseph Williams-Powell, Elijah Wilson, Demario Beck 11; Rebs: Demario Beck 8 Asts: Jaylen Shaw 4	Pts: Eric Mika 19; Rebs: Eric Mika 11; Asts: L.J. Rose 9

Marriott Center
Provo, UT
Attendance: 15,003
Referees: Randy McCall, Kevin Brill, Jeff Wooten

=== Saint Louis ===
Broadcaster: Tony Cordasco
Series History: BYU leads series 3–1
Starting Lineups:

- BYU: Nick Emery, L.J. Rose, Eric Mika, Kyle Davis, TJ Haws
- Saint Louis: Davell Roby, Jermaine Bishop, Mike Crawford, Elliott Welmer, Reggie Agbeko

YouTube

Nov 21
6:30 p.m. PST

Recap

BYU Cougars 92, Saint Louis Billikens 62
Scoring by half: 40–33, 52–29
Pts: Kyle Davis 22; Rebs: L.J. Rose 12; Asts: L.J. Rose 8	Pts: Jermaine Bishop 27; Rebs: Reggie Agbeko 10; Asts: Mike Crawford 3

MGM Grand Garden Arena
Las Vegas, NV
Attendance: 2,107
Referees: Tom O'Neill, Kelly Self, Marques Pettigrew

=== Valparaiso ===
Broadcasters: Eric Rothman & Stephen Howard
Series History: Valparaiso leads series 2–1
Starting Lineups:

- Valparaiso: Tevonn Walker, Shane Hammink, Lexus Williams, Jubril Adekoya, Alec Peters
- BYU: Nick Emery, L.J. Rose, Eric Mika, Kyle Davis, TJ Haws

ESPN2

Nov 23
9:00 p.m. PST

Recap

Valparaiso Crusaders 92, BYU Cougars 89
Scoring by half: 44–46, 48–43
Pts: Alec Peters 26; Rebs: Alec Peters 12; Asts: Max Joseph 5	Pts: Nick Emery 18; Rebs: L.J. Rose 7 Asts: L.J. Rose 6

MGM Grand Garden Arena
Las Vegas, NV
Attendance: N/A
Referees: Gerry Pollard, Kipp Kissinger, Larry Spaulding

=== Utah Valley ===
Broadcaster: Robbie Bullough
Series History: BYU leads series 2–0
Starting Lineups:

- Utah Valley: Conner Toolson, Zach Nelson, Isaac Neilson, Brandon Randolph, Kenneth Ogbe
- BYU: Nick Emery, L.J. Rose, Eric Mika, Kyle Davis, TJ Haws

TheW.tv

Nov 26
4:05 p.m. MST

Recap

Utah Valley Wolverines 114, BYU Cougars 101
Scoring by half: 54–52, 60–49
Pts: Isaac Neilson 26; Rebs: Isaac Neilson, Brandon Randolph 9 Asts: Brandon Randolph 14	Pts: Nick Emery 37; Rebs: L.J. Rose 7 Asts: TJ Haws 7

Marriott Center
Provo, UT
Attendance: 16,003
Referees: Chris Rastatter, Winston Smith, Tim O'Neill

=== Utah State ===
Broadcasters: Dave McCann, TBA, & Spencer Linton
Series History: BYU leads series 140–92
Starting Lineups:

- Utah State:
- BYU:

BYUtv

Nov 30

BYU Cougars 77, Utah State Aggies 63
Scoring by half: 37-31, 40-32
Pts: Eric Mika 20; Rebs: Yoeli Childs 12; Asts: LJ Rose 6	Pts: Jalen Moore 15; Rebs: Quinn Taylor 6 Asts: Quinn Taylor, Sam Merrill 3

Vivint Smart Home Arena
Salt Lake City, UT

=== USC ===
Broadcasters: Mark Neely, TBA, and TBA
Series History: USC leads series 6-3
Starting Lineups:

- BYU:
- USC:

ESPNU

Dec 3
6:00 MST

BYU Cougars 84, USC Trojans 91
Scoring by half: 32-39, 52-52
Pts: Eric Mika 29; Rebs: Eric Mika 9 Asts: L.J. Rose 3	Pts: Jordan McLaughlin 24; Rebs: De'Anthony Melton 8 Asts: De'Anthony Melton 6

STAPLES Center
Los Angeles, CA
