= 2016–17 Portland Pilots men's basketball team =

American college basketball season

2016–17 Portland Pilots men's basketball
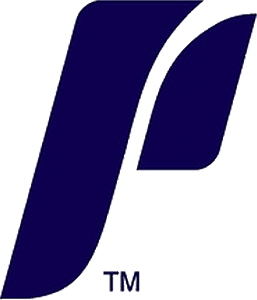
- Conference: West Coast Conference
- Record: 11–22 (2–16 WCC)
- Head coach: Terry Porter (1st season)
- Assistant coaches: Bob Cantu; Ben Johnson; Kramer Knutson
- Home arena: Chiles Center

2016–17 West Coast Conference men's basketball standings
	Conf.				Overall
Team	W		L	PCT	W		L	PCT
No. 2 Gonzaga †	17	–	1	.944	37	–	2	.949
No. 22 Saint Mary's	16	–	2	.889	29	–	5	.853
BYU	12	–	6	.667	22	–	12	.647
San Francisco	10	–	8	.556	20	–	13	.606
Santa Clara	10	–	8	.556	17	–	16	.515
Loyola Marymount	8	–	10	.444	15	–	15	.500
San Diego	6	–	12	.333	13	–	18	.419
Pepperdine	5	–	13	.278	9	–	22	.290
Pacific	4	–	14	.222	11	–	22	.333
Portland	2	–	16	.111	11	–	22	.333
† Conference tournament winner Rankings from AP poll

The 2016–17 Portland Pilots men's basketball team represented the University of Portland during the 2016–17 NCAA Division I men's basketball season. The Pilots, led by first-year head coach Terry Porter, played their home games at the Chiles Center as members of the West Coast Conference. They finished the season 11–22, 2–16 in WCC play to finish in last place. They defeated San Diego in the first round of the WCC tournament to advance to the quarterfinals where they lost to Saint Mary's.

== Previous season ==
The Pilots finished the 2015–16 season 12–20, 6–12 in WCC play to finish in a three-way tie for seventh place. They lost in the quarterfinals of the WCC tournament to Gonzaga.

On March 15, 2016, the school fired head coach Eric Reveno. He finished at Portland with a 10-year record of 140–178. On April 1, the school announced that Terry Porter had been hired as head coach.

== Departures ==
Name	Number	Pos.	Height	Weight	Year	Hometown	Notes
Bryce Pressley	1	G	6'4"	210	Senior	Sacramento, CA	Graduated
Jason Todd	10	G/F	6'4"	210	Sophomore	Mill Creek, WA	Transferred to California Baptist
Colin Russell	11	F/C	6'9"	220	Freshman	Folsom, CA	Transferred to Casper College
Max Livingston	20	G/F	6'5"	210	Senior	Lake Oswego, OR	Walk-on; graduated

=== Incoming transfers ===
Name	Number	Pos.	Height	Weight	Year	Hometown	Previous School
Franklin Porter	13	G	6'4"	210	Sophomore	Portland, OR	Transferred from Saint Mary's. Under NCAA transfer rules, Porter will have to sit out for the 2016–17 season. Will have three years of remaining eligibility.

== Recruitment ==
College recruiting information
Name	Hometown	School	Height	Weight	Commit date
Joseph Smoyer; C	Portland, OR	Franklin High School	6 ft 10 in (2.08 m)	210 lb (95 kg)	
Joseph Smoyer; C	Recruit ratings: Scout: Rivals: (NR)				
Malcolm Porter; SG	Portland, OR	Jesuit High School	6 ft 3 in (1.91 m)	N/A	
Malcolm Porter; SG	Recruit ratings: Scout: Rivals: (NR)				
Overall recruit ranking: Scout: nr Rivals: nr ESPN: nr
Note: In many cases, Scout, Rivals, 247Sports, On3, and ESPN may conflict in their listings of height and weight.; In these cases, the average was taken. ESPN grades are on a 100-point scale.; Sources: "Portland Pilots 2016 Basketball Commitments". Rivals.; "2016 Portland Pilots Basketball Commits". Scout.; "ESPN 2016 Portland Pilots Basketball recruits". ESPN.; "Scout.com Team Recruiting Rankings". Scout.; "2016 Team Ranking". Rivals.

=== Recruiting class of 2017 ===
College recruiting information (2017)
Name	Hometown	School	Height	Weight	Commit date
Isaac Bonton #68 PG	Portland, OR	Parkrose High School	6 ft 2 in (1.88 m)	175 lb (79 kg)	
Isaac Bonton #68 PG	Recruit ratings: Scout: Rivals: (64)				
Overall recruit ranking: Scout: nr Rivals: nr ESPN: nr
Note: In many cases, Scout, Rivals, 247Sports, On3, and ESPN may conflict in their listings of height and weight.; In these cases, the average was taken. ESPN grades are on a 100-point scale.; Sources: "Portland Pilots 2017 Basketball Commitments". Rivals.; "2017 Portland Pilots Basketball Commits". Scout.; "ESPN 2017 Portland Pilots Basketball recruits". ESPN.; "Scout.com Team Recruiting Rankings". Scout.; "2017 Team Ranking". Rivals.

== Roster ==
2016–17 Portland Pilots men's basketball team
Players
Coaches

Pos.	#	Name	Height	Weight	Year	Previous school	Hometown
G	0	Xavier Hallinan (W)	6 ft 0 in (1.83 m)	165 lb (75 kg)	So	Central Catholic	Portland, OR
G	1	Malcolm Porter	6 ft 3 in (1.91 m)	190 lb (86 kg)	Fr	Jesuit	Portland, OR
G	2	Alec Wintering	6 ft 0 in (1.83 m)	165 lb (75 kg)	Sr	United Faith	Concord, NC
G	3	Rashad Jackson	6 ft 3 in (1.91 m)	180 lb (82 kg)	So	Impact Basketball Academy	Bakersfield, CA
G/F	4	Chier Maker	6 ft 7 in (2.01 m)	200 lb (91 kg)	RS Fr	Newington College	Sydney, Australia
G	5	D'Marques Tyson	6 ft 5 in (1.96 m)	205 lb (93 kg)	Jr	Quality Education Academy	Bothell, WA
G	11	Andre Ferguson	6 ft 0 in (1.83 m)	180 lb (82 kg)	Fr	Pacific Hills	Los Angeles, CA
G	13	Franklin Porter (I) (redshirt)	6 ft 3 in (1.91 m)	215 lb (98 kg)	So	Saint Mary's; Tilton School	Portland, OR
C	15	Philipp Hartwich	7 ft 1 in (2.16 m)	250 lb (113 kg)	Jr	Dreikonigs Gymnasium	Cologne, Germany
G	20	Alec Monson	6 ft 5 in (1.96 m)	175 lb (79 kg)	Fr	Olympus	Salt Lake City, UT
G	22	Jazz Johnson	5 ft 10 in (1.78 m)	200 lb (91 kg)	So	Lake Oswego	Lake Oswego, OR
F	24	Gabe Taylor	6 ft 8 in (2.03 m)	230 lb (104 kg)	Jr	Valley Catholic School	Portland, OR
C	32	Ray Barreno	6 ft 10 in (2.08 m)	250 lb (113 kg)	Sr	New Mexico JC; Faith Christian Acad.	Ascension Chihuahua, Mexico
F	33	Jarrel Marshall	6 ft 6 in (1.98 m)	185 lb (84 kg)	Sr	Palm Beach State College; Mount Vernon HS	Mount Vernon, NY
F/C	41	Joseph Smoyer	6 ft 10 in (2.08 m)	210 lb (95 kg)	Fr	Franklin	Portland, OR

Head coach

- Terry Porter (UW–Stevens Point)

Assistant coach(es)

- Bob Cantu (Chapman)
- Ben Johnson (Green Bay)
- Kramer Knutson (Portland)

Legend

- (C) Team captain
- (S) Suspended
- (I) Ineligible
- (W) Walk-on
- Injured
- Current redshirt

Roster

== Schedule and results ==
Date time, TV	Rank^{#}	Opponent^{#}	Result	Record	Site (attendance) city, state
Exhibition
10/29/2016*; 7:00 pm		Multnomah	W 87–57		Chiles Center (1,407); Portland, OR
11/04/2016*; 7:00 pm		Evergreen State	W 92–54		Chiles Center (1,543); Portland, OR
Regular season
11/11/2016*; 7:00 pm		UC Riverside	W 71–55	1–0	Chiles Center (2,601); Portland, OR
11/15/2016*; 7:00 pm		at San Jose State	W 79–66	2–0	Event Center Arena (1,623); San Jose, CA
11/18/2016*; 7:00 pm		Lewis & Clark	W 98–52	3–0	Chiles Center (2,034); Portland, OR
11/24/2016*; 8:00 pm, ESPN2		vs. No. 14 UCLA; Wooden Legacy quarterfinals	L 77–99	3–1	Titan Gym (3,816); Fullerton, CA
11/25/2016*; 6:30 pm, ESPN3		vs. Dayton; Wooden Legacy consolation 2nd round	L 74–84	3–2	Titan Gym (5,153); Fullerton, CA
11/27/2016*; 9:00 pm, ESPNU		vs. Cal State Northridge; Wooden Legacy 7th place game	W 96–78	4–2	Honda Center (3,718); Anaheim, CA
12/03/2016*; 7:00 pm		Colorado	L 63–76	4–3	Chiles Center (2,720); Portland, OR
12/05/2016*; 7:00 pm		Texas–Rio Grande Valley	W 90–89 ^{2OT}	5–3	Chiles Center (1,562); Portland, OR
12/10/2016*; 1:00 pm		at Boise State; Cancelled (travel conditions), game moved to 2017–18.			Taco Bell Arena; Boise, ID
12/16/2016*; 5:30 pm		vs. South Dakota; Dam City Classic	W 85–82	6–3	Moda Center (6,521); Portland, OR
12/18/2016*; 3:00 pm, P12N		vs. Oregon State; Dam City Classic	W 53–45	7–3	Moda Center (8,334); Portland, OR
12/20/2016*; 7:00 pm		Portland State	L 75–77	7–4	Chiles Center (2,679); Portland, OR
12/22/2016*; 7:30 pm		at Cal State Fullerton	L 72–77 ^{OT}	7–5	Titan Gym (673); Fullerton, CA
12/29/2016; 7:00 pm		at Pacific	W 80–76	8–5 (1–0)	Alex G. Spanos Center (1,622); Stockton, CA
12/31/2016; 5:00 pm, CSNNW		Pepperdine	W 73–60	9–5 (2–0)	Chiles Center (1,624); Portland, OR
01/05/2017; 7:00 pm		at Santa Clara	L 42–70	9–6 (2–1)	Leavey Center (1,404); Santa Clara, CA
01/09/2017; 5:00 pm, RTNW		No. 4 Gonzaga; Postponed (inclement weather), rescheduled for Jan. 23			Chiles Center; Portland, OR
01/12/2017; 8:00 pm, ESPNU		No. 21 Saint Mary's	L 33–74	9–7 (2–2)	Chiles Center (1,745); Portland, OR
01/14/2017; 7:00 pm, RTNW		Loyola Marymount	L 78–79	9–8 (2–3)	Chiles Center (1,597); Portland, OR
01/19/2017; 7:00 pm		at San Francisco	L 50–75	9–9 (2–4)	War Memorial Gymnasium (1,842); San Francisco, CA
01/21/2017; 5:00 pm, RTNW		at No. 4 Gonzaga	L 52–73	9–10 (2–5)	McCarthey Athletic Center (6,000); Spokane, WA
01/23/2017; 5:00 pm, RTNW		No. 3 Gonzaga	L 64–83	9–11 (2–6)	Chiles Center (4,852); Portland, OR
01/26/2017; 7:00 pm, RTNW		at Pepperdine	L 60–78	9–12 (2–7)	Firestone Fieldhouse; Malibu, CA
01/28/2017; 7:00 pm, RTNW		San Diego	L 52–68	9–13 (2–8)	Chiles Center (3,411); Portland, OR
02/02/2017; 7:00 pm, RTNW		Santa Clara	L 45–60	9–14 (2–9)	Chiles Center (1,706); Portland, OR
02/04/2017; 6:00 pm, BYUtv		at BYU	L 62–73	9–15 (2–10)	Marriott Center (13,775); Provo, UT
02/09/2017; 7:00 pm		at No. 20 Saint Mary's	L 41–51	9–16 (2–11)	McKeon Pavilion (2,813); Moraga, CA
02/11/2017; 1:00 pm, RTNW		at Loyola Marymount	L 60–66	9–17 (2–12)	Gersten Pavilion (3,230); Los Angeles, CA
02/16/2017; 7:00 pm		Pacific	L 65–76	9–18 (2–13)	Chiles Center (2,023); Portland, OR
02/18/2017; 7:00 pm, CSNNW		San Francisco	L 51–67	9–19 (2–14)	Chiles Center (3,259); Portland, OR
02/20/2017*; 4:00 pm		Walla Walla	W 96–58	10–19	Chiles Center (551); Portland, OR
02/23/2017; 7:00 pm, RTRM		BYU	L 78–97	10–20 (2–15)	Chiles Center (3,121); Portland, OR
02/25/2017; 6:00 pm, RTNW		at San Diego	L 82–85	10–21 (2–16)	Jenny Craig Pavilion (1,086); San Diego, CA
WCC tournament
03/03/2017; 8:00 pm, BYUtv	(10)	vs. (7) San Diego; First round	W 60–55	11–21	Orleans Arena (7,484); Paradise, NV
03/04/2017; 9:00 pm, ESPN2	(10)	vs. (7) No. 20 Saint Mary's; Quarterfinals	L 58–81	11–22	Orleans Arena (7,315); Paradise, NV
*Non-conference game. ^{#}Rankings from AP Poll. (#) Tournament seedings in parentheses. All times are in Pacific Time.

Source: Schedule
