= Jock Perry =

Australian basketball player (born 1997)

Melbourne Tigers
- Position: Centre
- League: NBL1 South

Personal information
- Born: 20 May 1997 (age 29)
- Listed height: 7 ft 1 in (2.16 m)
- Listed weight: 250 lb (113 kg)

Career information
- High school: Lake Ginninderra College (Canberra, Australia)
- College: Saint Mary's (2017–2020); UC Riverside (2020–2021)
- NBA draft: 2021: undrafted
- Playing career: 2015–present

Career history
- 2015: BA Centre of Excellence
- 2016: Melbourne Tigers
- 2021: Ballarat Miners
- 2021–2022: Tasmania JackJumpers
- 2022: Casey Cavaliers
- 2023–2025: Diamond Valley Eagles
- 2024–2025: Sarawak Cola Warriors
- 2025: Gujarat Stallions
- 2026: Jiaozuo Cultural Tourism
- 2026: Mandurah Magic
- 2027–: Melbourne Tigers

Career highlights
- INBL champion (2025); NBL1 South All Second Team (2025)
Medals
Men's basketball
Representing Australia
Universiade
Bronze medal – third place	2019 Italy	Team

Jock Henry Perry (born 20 May 1997) is an Australian professional basketball player for the Melbourne Tigers of the NBL1 South. He played college basketball for the Saint Mary's Gaels and the UC Riverside Highlanders.

== Early life and career ==
Perry grew up in Seddon, Victoria and came from a tall family, although his height resulted in breaking 13 different bones. His level of insulin growth hormone was found to be twice that of a normal person's, and a brain scan revealed a tumour on his pituitary gland. A month later, the tumour was removed and found to be benign. Perry was a relative latecomer to basketball, though his height provided an advantage. He arrived at the BA Centre of Excellence in 2013, and sustained knee and hand injuries. Perry played against future Saint Mary's teammate Jock Landale once as a teenager, helping to score an upset win. In 2016, Perry signed with the Melbourne Tigers of the South East Australian Basketball League. He committed to play college basketball at Saint Mary's.

== College career ==
Perry redshirted his true freshman season. He played sparingly during his three seasons at Saint Mary's. As a junior, Perry averaged 3.3 points and 2.1 rebounds per game. Following the season, he transferred to UC Riverside as a graduate transfer. On 1 December 2020, Perry scored a career-high 21 points in a 57–42 win against Washington. In the semifinals of the Big West Tournament, he posted 16 points and a career-high 10 rebounds against UC Irvine. As a senior, Perry averaged 11.5 points and 5.2 rebounds per game. He was named Honorable Mention All-Big West.

== Professional career ==
On 22 April 2021, Perry signed with the Ballarat Miners of the NBL1 South. On 17 August, Perry signed with the Tasmania JackJumpers as a development player for the 2021–22 NBL season.

While playing for the Casey Cavaliers during the 2022 NBL1 season, Perry ruptured his ACL. He subsequently missed the 2022–23 NBL season, returning to play the last 14 games of the 2023 NBL1 season with the Diamond Valley Eagles.

Perry helped the Gujarat Stallions win the 2025 Indian National Basketball League (INBL) championship.

Perry joined the Diamond Valley Eagles for the 2025 NBL1 South season. He was named NBL1 South All Second Team and was the league's leading rebounder with 13.26 rebounds per game.

In January 2026, Perry played 11 games for Jiaozuo Cultural Tourism in the Chinese NBL. He joined the Mandurah Magic for the 2026 NBL1 West season.

In November 2026, Perry signed with the Melbourne Tigers of the NBL1 South for the 2027 NBL1 season.

== National team career ==
Perry has represented Australia in several international tournaments. He played for the U17 team in the 2013 FIBA Oceania Championships, averaging 2.7 points and 2 rebounds per game. Perry was selected as a reserve player in the 2015 FIBA Oceania U19 Championship. In 2019, he helped Australia win bronze at the Summer Universiade in Italy.

== Career statistics ==
Legend
GP	Games played	GS	Games started	MPG	Minutes per game
FG%	Field goal percentage	3P%	3-point field goal percentage	FT%	Free throw percentage
RPG	Rebounds per game	APG	Assists per game	SPG	Steals per game
BPG	Blocks per game	PPG	Points per game	**Bold**	Career high

=== College ===
Year	Team	GP	GS	MPG	FG%	3P%	FT%	RPG	APG	SPG	BPG	PPG
2016–17	Saint Mary's	Redshirt										
2017–18	Saint Mary's	21	0	3.2	.517	.353	.727	.3	.0	.0	.0	2.1
2018–19	Saint Mary's	**26**	0	5.3	.447	**.467**	.714	1.2	.2	.0	.1	2.1
2019–20	Saint Mary's	15	0	7.4	**.588**	.000	.818	2.1	.4	.1	.1	3.3
2020–21	UC Riverside	22	**22**	**25.6**	.486	.370	**.821**	**5.2**	**1.1**	**.5**	**.5**	**11.5**
Career		84	22	10.5	.494	.367	.789	2.2	.4	.2	.2	4.8
