= 2016–17 San Diego Toreros men's basketball team =

American college basketball season

2016–17 San Diego Toreros men's basketball
- Conference: West Coast Conference
- Record: 13–18 (6–12 WCC)
- Head coach: Lamont Smith (2nd season)
- Assistant coaches: Russell Springmann; Sam Scholl; Chris Gerlufsen
- Home arena: Jenny Craig Pavilion

2016–17 West Coast Conference men's basketball standings
	Conf.				Overall
Team	W		L	PCT	W		L	PCT
No. 2 Gonzaga †	17	–	1	.944	37	–	2	.949
No. 22 Saint Mary's	16	–	2	.889	29	–	5	.853
BYU	12	–	6	.667	22	–	12	.647
San Francisco	10	–	8	.556	20	–	13	.606
Santa Clara	10	–	8	.556	17	–	16	.515
Loyola Marymount	8	–	10	.444	15	–	15	.500
San Diego	6	–	12	.333	13	–	18	.419
Pepperdine	5	–	13	.278	9	–	22	.290
Pacific	4	–	14	.222	11	–	22	.333
Portland	2	–	16	.111	11	–	22	.333
† Conference tournament winner Rankings from AP poll

The 2016–17 San Diego Toreros men's basketball team represented the University of San Diego during the 2016–17 NCAA Division I men's basketball season. This was head coach Lamont Smith's second season at San Diego. The Toreros competed in the West Coast Conference and played their home games at the Jenny Craig Pavilion. They finished the season 13–18, 6–12 in WCC play to finish in seventh place. They lost in the first round of the WCC tournament to Portland.

== Previous season ==
The Toreros finished the 2015–16 season 9–21, 4–14 in WCC play to finish in last place. They lost in the first round of the WCC tournament to Loyola Marymount.

== Departures ==
Name	Number	Pos.	Height	Weight	Year	Hometown	Notes
Khali Bedart-Ghani	0	G	6'4"	192	Sophomore	Los Angeles, CA	Transferred to Cal State Dominguez Hills Toros
Brandon Perry	2	F/C	6'7"	265	RS Junior	Fresno, CA	Graduate transferred to Lewis & Clark College
Vasa Pusica	4	G	6'5"	210	Sophomore	Belgrade, Serbia	Transferred to Northeastern
Duda Sanadze	10	G	6'5"	210	Senior	Tbilisi, Georgia	Graduated
Marcus Harris	11	G	6'0"	168	Sophomore	San Antonio, TX	Transferred to Sam Houston State
Christian Oshita	24	F	6'6"	190	Freshman	Torrance, CA	Walk-on; transferred to UC San Diego
Ryan Woolridge	30	G	6'3"	170	Freshman	Mansfield, TX	Transferred to North Texas
Jito Kok	33	C	6'9"	232	Senior	Wageningen, Netherlands	Graduated

=== Incoming transfers ===
Name	Number	Pos.	Height	Weight	Year	Hometown	Notes
Isaiah Wright	22	G	6'2"	180	Junior	Boise, ID	Transferred from Utah. Under NCAA transfer rules, Wright will have to sit out for the 2016–17 season. Will have two years of remaining eligibility.
Isaiah Pineiro	24	F	6'6"	210	Junior	Auburn, CA	Transferred from Portland State. Under NCAA transfer rules, Pineiro will have to sit out for the 2016–17 season. Will have two years of remaining eligibility.

== Recruits class of 2016 ==
College recruiting information
Name	Hometown	School	Height	Weight	Commit date
Jose Martinez #110 PF	Cayey, PR	Cheshire Academy	6 ft 10 in (2.08 m)	180 lb (82 kg)	Sep 21, 2015
Jose Martinez #110 PF	Recruit ratings: Scout: Rivals: (59)				
Frank Ryder; PF	Boulder, CO	Fairview High School	6 ft 10 in (2.08 m)	N/A	Nov 5, 2015
Frank Ryder; PF	Recruit ratings: Scout: Rivals: (NR)				
Nassir Barrino; PG	Jersey City, NJ	Worcester Academy	6 ft 0 in (1.83 m)	180 lb (82 kg)	
Nassir Barrino; PG	Recruit ratings: Scout: Rivals: (NR)				
Overall recruit ranking: Scout: nr Rivals: nr ESPN: nr
Note: In many cases, Scout, Rivals, 247Sports, On3, and ESPN may conflict in their listings of height and weight.; In these cases, the average was taken. ESPN grades are on a 100-point scale.; Sources: "San Diego Toreros 2016 Basketball Commitments". Rivals.; "2016 San Diego Toreros Basketball Commits". Scout.; "ESPN 2016 San Diego Toreros Basketball recruits". ESPN.; "Scout.com Team Recruiting Rankings". Scout.; "2016 Team Ranking". Rivals.

== Roster ==
2016–17 San Diego Toreros men's basketball team
Players
Coaches

Pos.	#	Name	Height	Weight	Year	Previous school	Hometown
G	0	Nassir Barrino	6 ft 0 in (1.83 m)	165 lb (75 kg)	Fr	Worcester Academy	Newark, NJ
G	1	Tyler Williams	6 ft 5 in (1.96 m)	190 lb (86 kg)	So	Hebron	Plano, TX
G	2	Mark Carbone	6 ft 2 in (1.88 m)	180 lb (82 kg)	Fr	East Catholic	Wethersfield, CT
G	3	Olin Carter III	6 ft 2 in (1.88 m)	190 lb (86 kg)	So	Allen	Allen, TX
F	12	Juwan Gray	6 ft 8 in (2.03 m)	190 lb (86 kg)	Fr	Scotland Performance Institute	Dover, DE
F	13	José Martinez	6 ft 10 in (2.08 m)	200 lb (91 kg)	Fr	Cheshire Academy	Cayey, PR
G	14	Nick Bush	6 ft 4 in (1.93 m)	190 lb (86 kg)	Fr	Santa Barbara	Santa Barbara, CA
F	15	Alex Floresca (W)	6 ft 8 in (2.03 m)	230 lb (104 kg)	So	Webster Groves	Webster Groves, MO
F	20	Cameron Naubauer	6 ft 7 in (2.01 m)	220 lb (100 kg)	Jr	Choate Rosemary Hall Prep	Berlin, Germany
G	21	Hunter Summy	6 ft 4 in (1.93 m)	180 lb (82 kg)	So	Carroll	Southlake, TX
G	23	Isaiah Wright (I) (redshirt)	6 ft 2 in (1.88 m)	180 lb (82 kg)	Jr	Borah; Utah	Boise, ID
F	24	Isaiah Pineiro (I) (redshirt)	6 ft 6 in (1.98 m)	210 lb (95 kg)	Jr	Placer; Portland State	Auburn, CA
F	30	Frank Ryder	6 ft 10 in (2.08 m)	230 lb (104 kg)	Fr	Fairview	Boulder, CO
F	32	Brett Bailey	6 ft 6 in (1.98 m)	205 lb (93 kg)	Sr	University	Spokane, WA

Head coach

- Lamont Smith (San Diego)

Assistant coach(es)

- Russell Springmann (Salisbury)
- Sam Scholl (San Diego)
- Chris Gerlufsen (Randolph–Macon)

Legend

- (C) Team captain
- (S) Suspended
- (I) Ineligible
- (W) Walk-on
- Injured
- Current redshirt

Roster

== Schedule and results ==
Date time, TV	Rank^{#}	Opponent^{#}	Result	Record	Site (attendance) city, state
Non-conference regular season
11/11/2016*; 8:00 pm, ESPNU		at San Diego State; City Championship	L 59–69	0–1	Viejas Arena (12,414); San Diego, CA
11/14/2016*; 7:00 pm		Samford; San Diego Classic	L 65–83	0–2	Jenny Craig Pavilion (2,379); San Diego, CA
11/17/2016*; 8:00 pm, P12N		at No. 16 UCLA	L 68–88	0–3	Pauley Pavilion (6,893); Los Angeles, CA
11/20/2016*; 2:00 pm		Nicholls State; San Diego Classic	W 81–72	1–3	Jenny Craig Pavilion (849); San Diego, CA
11/22/2016*; 7:00 pm		Bethune-Cookman; San Diego Classic	W 96–91 ^{3OT}	2–3	Jenny Craig Pavilion (866); San Diego, CA
11/26/2016*; 2:00 pm		New Mexico State; San Diego Classic	L 51–56	2–4	Jenny Craig Pavilion (1,008); San Diego, CA
11/30/2016*; 7:00 pm		USC	L 55–76	2–5	Jenny Craig Pavilion (2,921); San Diego, CA
12/03/2016*; 1:00 pm		at Northern Arizona	W 80–65	3–5	Walkup Skydome (767); Flagstaff, AZ
12/07/2016*; 7:00 pm		Cal State Fullerton	W 82–75	4–5	Jenny Craig Pavilion (940); San Diego, CA
12/11/2016*; 5:00 pm		UC Santa Barbara	W 77–68	5–5	Jenny Craig Pavilion (1,078); San Diego, CA
12/17/2016*; 6:00 pm		Bethesda	W 105–89	6–5	Jenny Craig Pavilion (960); San Diego, CA
12/22/2016*; 5:00 pm		at North Texas	W 69–68	7–5	The Super Pit (2,717); Denton, TX
WCC regular season
12/29/2016; 7:00 pm		at San Francisco	L 74–80	7–6 (0–1)	War Memorial Gymnasium (2,115); San Francisco, CA
12/31/2016; 6:00 pm		at No. 19 Saint Mary's	L 60–72	7–7 (0–2)	McKeon Pavilion (2,891); Moraga, CA
01/05/2017; 7:00 pm		Pacific	L 53–56	7–8 (0–3)	Jenny Craig Pavilion (1,207); San Diego, CA
01/07/2017; 1:00 pm, SPCSN		at Pepperdine	W 76–68	8–8 (1–3)	Firestone Fieldhouse (1,007); Malibu, CA
01/12/2017; 7:00 pm		Santa Clara	L 57–59	8–9 (1–4)	Jenny Craig Pavilion (1,435); San Diego, CA
01/14/2017; 7:00 pm, SPCSN		BYU	W 88–75	9–9 (2–4)	Jenny Craig Pavilion (2,206); San Diego, CA
01/19/2017; 7:00 pm, SPCSN		at Loyola Marymount	W 69–62	10–9 (3–4)	Gersten Pavilion (1,712); Los Angeles, CA
01/21/2017; 6:00 pm		San Francisco	L 43–60	10–10 (3–5)	Jenny Craig Pavilion (1,730); San Diego, CA
01/26/2017; 6:00 pm, RTNW/KHQ		at No. 3 Gonzaga	L 43–79	10–11 (3–6)	McCarthey Athletic Center (6,000); Spokane, WA
01/28/2017; 7:00 pm, RTNW		at Portland	W 68–52	11–11 (4–6)	Chiles Center (3,411); Portland, OR
02/02/2017; 7:00 pm		Loyola Marymount	L 53–72	11–12 (4–7)	Jenny Craig Pavilion (1,230); San Diego, CA
02/04/2017; 7:00 pm, SPCSN		No. 18 Saint Mary's	L 27–71	11–13 (4–8)	Jenny Craig Pavilion (1,261); San Diego, CA
02/09/2017; 7:00 pm		at Pacific	L 58–61	11–14 (4–9)	Alex G. Spanos Center (1,536); Stockton, CA
02/11/2017; 6:00 pm, SPCSN		Pepperdine	L 60–65	11–15 (4–10)	Jenny Craig Pavilion (1,276); San Diego, CA
02/16/2017; 8:00 pm, ESPNU		at BYU	L 70–82	11–16 (4–11)	Marriott Center (13,440); Provo, UT
02/18/2017; 7:00 pm		at Santa Clara	W 60–58 ^{2OT}	12–16 (5–11)	Leavey Center (1,828); Santa Clara, CA
02/23/2017; 7:00 pm, SPCSN		No. 1 Gonzaga	L 38–96	12–17 (5–12)	Jenny Craig Pavilion (5,100); San Diego, CA
02/25/2017; 6:00 pm, SPCSN		Portland	W 85–82	13–17 (6–12)	Jenny Craig Pavilion (1,086); San Diego, CA
WCC tournament
03/03/2017; 8:00 pm, BYUtv	(7)	vs. (10) Portland; First round	L 55–60	13–18	Orleans Arena (7,484); Paradise, NV
*Non-conference game. ^{#}Rankings from AP Poll. (#) Tournament seedings in parentheses. All times are in Pacific Time.

== See also ==
- 2016–17 San Diego Toreros women's basketball team
