= 2017–18 San Diego Toreros men's basketball team =

American college basketball season

2017–18 San Diego Toreros men's basketball

Riley Wallace Classic champions

CIT, Quarterfinals
- Conference: West Coast Conference
- Record: 20–14 (9–9 WCC)
- Head coach: Lamont Smith (3rd season)
- Assistant coaches: Sam Scholl; Chris Gerlufsen; Terrence Rencher
- Home arena: Jenny Craig Pavilion

2017–18 West Coast Conference men's basketball standings
	Conf.				Overall
Team	W		L	PCT	W		L	PCT
No. 8 Gonzaga †	17	–	1	.944	32	–	5	.865
No. 25 Saint Mary's	16	–	2	.889	30	–	6	.833
BYU	11	–	7	.611	24	–	11	.686
San Diego	9	–	9	.500	20	–	14	.588
San Francisco	9	–	9	.500	22	–	17	.564
Pacific	9	–	9	.500	14	–	18	.438
Santa Clara	8	–	10	.444	11	–	20	.355
Loyola Marymount	5	–	13	.278	11	–	20	.355
Portland	4	–	14	.222	10	–	22	.313
Pepperdine	2	–	16	.111	6	–	26	.188
† Conference tournament winner Rankings from AP poll

The 2017–18 San Diego Toreros men's basketball team represented the University of San Diego during the 2017–18 NCAA Division I men's basketball season. This was head coach Lamont Smith's third season at San Diego. The Toreros competed in the West Coast Conference and played their home games at the Jenny Craig Pavilion. They finished the season 20–14, 9–9 in WCC play to finish in a three-way tie for fourth place. They lost to BYU in the quarterfinals of the WCC tournament. The Toreros were invited to the CollegeInsider.com Tournament where they defeated Hartford in the first round, in a game referred to as the Riley Wallace Classic, and Portland State in the second round before losing in the quarterfinals to Northern Colorado.

On March 8, 2018, head coach Lamont Smith, who had been placed on administrative leave following an arrest for domestic violence 10 days earlier, resigned as head coach. Assistant coach Sam Scholl took over as acting head coach for the Toreros during the WCC Tournament and the CIT. On April 2, the school announced Scholl would remain the head coach.

== Previous season ==
The Toreros finished the 2016–17 season 13–18, 6–12 in WCC play to finish in seventh place. They lost in the first round of the WCC tournament to Portland.

== Offseason ==
=== Departures ===
Name	Number	Pos.	Height	Weight	Year	Hometown	Notes
Nassir Barrino	0	G	6'0"	165	Freshman	Newark, NJ	Left team for personal reasons
Mark Carbone	2	G	6'2"	180	Freshman	Wethersfield, CT	Transferred to New Hampshire
Nick Bush	14	G	6'4"	190	Freshman	Santa Barbara, CA	Walk on, left team for personal reasons
Frank Ryder	30	F	6'10"	230	Freshman	Boulder, CO	Left team for personal reasons
Brett Bailey	32	F	6'6"	205	Senior	Spokane, Washington	Graduated

=== 2017 recruiting class ===
College recruiting information
Name	Hometown	School	Height	Weight	Commit date
Joey Calcaterra #102 SG	Kentfield, CA	Marian Catholic	6 ft 2 in (1.88 m)	165 lb (75 kg)	Sep 29, 2016
Joey Calcaterra #102 SG	Recruit ratings: Scout: Rivals: (62)				
Emanuel Hylton #127 SG	Washington, DC	St Johns	6 ft 3 in (1.91 m)	185 lb (84 kg)	Sep 28, 2016
Emanuel Hylton #127 SG	Recruit ratings: Scout: Rivals: (55)				
Andrew Ferguson; C	Perth, Australia	Australia Institute of Sport	7 ft 0 in (2.13 m)	N/A	
Andrew Ferguson; C	Recruit ratings: Scout: Rivals: (NR)				
Akim-Jamal Jonah; C	Berlin, Germany	RSV Eintracht Stahnsdorf	6 ft 11 in (2.11 m)	245 lb (111 kg)	
Akim-Jamal Jonah; C	Recruit ratings: Scout: Rivals: (NR)				
Overall recruit ranking: Scout: nr Rivals: nr ESPN: nr
Note: In many cases, Scout, Rivals, 247Sports, On3, and ESPN may conflict in their listings of height and weight.; In these cases, the average was taken. ESPN grades are on a 100-point scale.; Sources: "San Diego Toreros 2017 Basketball Commitments". Rivals.; "2017 San Diego Toreros Basketball Commits". Scout.; "ESPN 2017 San Diego Toreros Basketball recruits". ESPN.; "Scout.com Team Recruiting Rankings". Scout.; "2017 Team Ranking". Rivals.

== Roster ==
2017–18 San Diego Toreros men's basketball team
Players
Coaches

Pos.	#	Name	Height	Weight	Year	Previous school	Hometown
F	0	Isaiah Pineiro	6 ft 7 in (2.01 m)	215 lb (98 kg)	RS Jr	Placer; Portland State	Auburn, CA
G	1	Tyler Williams	6 ft 5 in (1.96 m)	190 lb (86 kg)	Jr	Hebron	Plano, TX
G	2	Joey Calcaterra	6 ft 3 in (1.91 m)	165 lb (75 kg)	Fr	Marin Catholic	Novato, CA
G	3	Olin Carter III	6 ft 2 in (1.88 m)	190 lb (86 kg)	Jr	Allen	Allen, TX
G	4	Mitch Schafer (W)	5 ft 10 in (1.78 m)	170 lb (77 kg)	Jr	Jesuit	Portland, OR
G	5	Emanuel Hylton	6 ft 3 in (1.91 m)	200 lb (91 kg)	Fr	St. John's	Washington DC
G	10	Andy Nelson (W)	6 ft 1 in (1.85 m)	180 lb (82 kg)	So	Holy Family	Lafayette, CO
C	11	Akim-Jamal Jonah	6 ft 11 in (2.11 m)	245 lb (111 kg)	Fr	Friedrich-Ebert-Gymnasium	Berlin, Germany
F	12	Juwan Gray	6 ft 8 in (2.03 m)	190 lb (86 kg)	So	Scotland Performance Institute	Dover, DE
F	13	José Martinez	6 ft 10 in (2.08 m)	200 lb (91 kg)	So	Cheshire Academy	Cayey, PR
C	14	Andrew Ferguson	7 ft 0 in (2.13 m)	230 lb (104 kg)	Fr	Australian Centre of Excellence	Perth, Australia
F	15	Alex Floresca	6 ft 8 in (2.03 m)	240 lb (109 kg)	RS So	Webster Groves	Webster Groves, MO
F	20	Cameron Naubauer	6 ft 7 in (2.01 m)	220 lb (100 kg)	Sr	Choate Rosemary Hall Prep	Berlin, Germany
G	21	Hunter Summy (W)	6 ft 4 in (1.93 m)	180 lb (82 kg)	RS So	Carroll	Southlake, TX
G	22	Isaiah Wright	6 ft 2 in (1.88 m)	180 lb (82 kg)	RS Jr	Borah; Utah	Boise, ID
G	31	Vinny Ferrari (W)	5 ft 11 in (1.8 m)	175 lb (79 kg)	RS Fr	Burlingame; College of San Mateo	Burlingame, CA
C	32	Jake Gilliam (W)	6 ft 10 in (2.08 m)	255 lb (116 kg)	Fr	Torrey Pines	San Diego, CA

Head coach

- Lamont Smith (San Diego)

Assistant coach(es)

- Sam Scholl (San Diego)
- Chris Gerlufsen (Randolph–Macon)
- Terrence Rencher (Texas)

Legend

- (C) Team captain
- (S) Suspended
- (I) Ineligible
- (W) Walk-on
- Injured
- Current redshirt

Roster

== Schedule and results ==
Date time, TV	Rank^{#}	Opponent^{#}	Result	Record	Site (attendance) city, state
Exhibition
Nov 1, 2017*; 7:00 pm		Arizona State; Hurricane Maria relief charity game	L 77–85		Jenny Craig Pavilion (757); San Diego, CA
Non-conference regular season
Nov 12, 2017*; 2:00 pm		at San Jose State	W 81–64	1–0	Event Center Arena (1,433); San Jose, CA
Nov 15, 2017*; 7:00 pm		Robert Morris; Grand Canyon Classic	W 65–53	2–0	Jenny Craig Pavilion (1,131); San Diego, CA
Nov 18, 2017*; 7:00 pm, FSSD		Norfolk State; Grand Canyon Classic	W 71–62	3–0	Jenny Craig Pavilion (1,109); San Diego, CA
Nov 20, 2017*; 7:00 pm		Little Rock; Grand Canyon Classic	W 66–52	4–0	Jenny Craig Pavilion (1,074); San Diego, CA
Nov 25, 2017*; 7:00 pm, ESPN3		at Grand Canyon; Grand Canyon Classic	W 72–62	5–0	GCU Arena (7,397); Phoenix, AZ
Nov 30, 2017*; 7:00 pm, FS West		San Diego State; City Championship	L 57–66	5–1	Jenny Craig Pavilion (4,536); San Diego, CA
Dec 2, 2017*; 8:00 pm		at UC Santa Barbara	L 57–67	5–2	The Thunderdome (1,716); Santa Barbara, CA
Dec 6, 2017*; 7:00 pm, ESPN3		at New Mexico State	W 65–60	6–2	Pan American Center (3,798); Las Cruces, NM
Dec 9, 2017*; 6:00 pm, FSSD		Northern Arizona	W 79–51	7–2	Jenny Craig Pavilion (1,420); San Diego, CA
Dec 12, 2017*; 5:00 pm, P12N		at Colorado	W 69–59	8–2	Coors Events Center (6,512); Boulder, CO
Dec 16, 2017*; 7:30 pm		North Texas	L 83–86 ^{OT}	8–3	Jenny Craig Pavilion (1,419); San Diego, CA
Dec 22, 2017*; 7:00 pm		Life Pacific	W 94–51	9–3	Jenny Craig Pavilion (1,140); San Diego, CA
WCC regular season
Dec 28, 2017; 6:00 pm, SPCSN		San Francisco	W 73–63	10–3 (1–0)	Jenny Craig Pavilion (1,817); San Diego, CA
Dec 30, 2017; 1:00 pm, SPCSN		Pepperdine	W 74–66	11–3 (2–0)	Jenny Craig Pavilion (1,521); San Diego, CA
Jan 4, 2018; 7:00 pm		at Portland	W 81–74 ^{OT}	12–3 (3–0)	Chiles Center (1,396); Portland, OR
Jan 6, 2018; 8:00 pm, SPCSN		at Saint Mary's	L 63–70	12–4 (3–1)	McKeon Pavilion (3,317); Moraga, CA
Jan 11, 2018; 7:00 pm		at Pacific	L 70–74	12–5 (3–2)	Alex G. Spanos Center (1,369); Stockton, CA
Jan 13, 2018; 7:00 pm, SPCSN		Loyola Marymount	W 75–71	13–5 (4–2)	Jenny Craig Pavilion (1,627); San Diego, CA
Jan 18, 2018; 7:00 pm, SPCSN		Portland	L 49–55	13–6 (4–3)	Jenny Craig Pavilion (2,047); San Diego, CA
Jan 20, 2018; 6:00 pm, BYUtv		at BYU	L 58–74	13–7 (4–4)	Marriott Center (13,449); Provo, UT
Jan 25, 2018; 7:00 pm		Santa Clara	W 66–58	14–7 (5–4)	Jenny Craig Pavilion (1,231); San Diego, CA
Jan 27, 2018; 1:00 pm, SPCSN		at Loyola Marymount	W 89–82	15–7 (6–4)	Gersten Pavilion (937); Los Angeles, CA
Feb 1, 2018; 6:00 pm, ESPN3		at No. 14 Gonzaga	L 59–69	15–8 (6–5)	McCarthey Athletic Center (6,000); Spokane, WA
Feb 3, 2018; 6:00 pm, SPCSN		No. 13 Saint Mary's	L 62–65	15–9 (6–6)	Jenny Craig Pavilion (3,152); San Diego, CA
Feb 8, 2018; 7:30 pm, SPCSN		at Pepperdine	W 68–66	16–9 (7–6)	Firestone Fieldhouse (763); Malibu, CA
Feb 10, 2018; 1:00 pm		at Santa Clara	L 64–70	16–10 (7–7)	Leavey Center (2,046); Santa Clara, CA
Feb 15, 2018; 7:00 pm		Pacific	L 55–67	16–11 (7–8)	Jenny Craig Pavilion (1,391); San Diego, CA
Feb 17, 2018; 1:00 pm, SPCSN		BYU	W 75–62	17–11 (8–8)	Jenny Craig Pavilion; San Diego, CA
Feb 22, 2018; 6:00 pm, ESPN2		No. 6-t Gonzaga	L 72–77	17–12 (8–9)	Jenny Craig Pavilion (4,772); San Diego, CA
Feb 24, 2018; 8:00 pm		at San Francisco	L 61–64	18–12 (9–9)	War Memorial Gymnasium (1,796); San Francisco, CA
WCC tournament
Mar 2, 2018; 1:00 pm, SPCSN	(6)	vs. (3) BYU; Quarterfinals	L 79–85	18–13	Orleans Arena (7,279); Paradise, NV
CIT
Mar 12, 2018*; 7:00 pm, CBSSN		Hartford; First Round – Riley Wallace Classic	W 88–72	19–13	Jenny Craig Pavilion (893); San Diego, CA
Mar 17, 2018*; 7:00 pm		Portland State; Second round	W 67–64	20–13	Jenny Craig Pavilion (1,019); San Diego, CA
Mar 21, 2018*; 7:00 pm		Northern Colorado; Quarterfinals	L 75–86	20–14	Jenny Craig Pavilion (1,053); San Diego, CA
*Non-conference game. ^{#}Rankings from AP Poll. (#) Tournament seedings in parentheses. All times are in Pacific Time.

== See also ==
- 2017–18 San Diego Toreros women's basketball team
