= Phil Knight Invitational =

College basketball event in Portland, Oregon

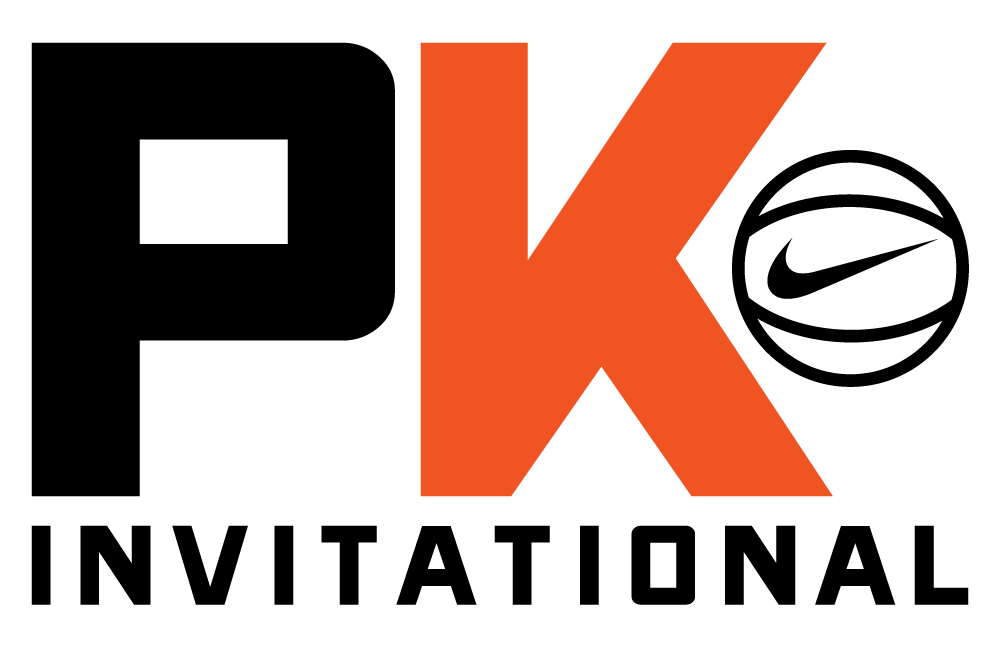
- Sport: College basketball
- Founded: 2017
- No. of teams: 16
- Country: United States
- Venues: Moda Center; Veterans Memorial Coliseum; Chiles Center; Portland, Oregon
- Most recent champions: Men's: UConn, Purdue; Women's: North Carolina, UConn
- Broadcaster: ESPN

The Phil Knight Invitational is a college basketball event held in Portland, Oregon to celebrate Nike co-founder Phil Knight. There have been three different events held, most recently in November 2022. The event has been held at the Moda Center and Veterans Memorial Coliseum in the Rose Quarter.

== 2017 event ==
The 2017 version of the event, also known as the PK-80 Invitational, was a 16-team, two-bracket college basketball event held on November 23, 24, and 26, 2017.

All teams had a business relationship with Nike. Each of the Power Five conferences of FBS football had two teams participating—the ACC (Duke and North Carolina), the Big 12 (Oklahoma and Texas), the Big Ten (Michigan State and Ohio State), the Pac-12 (Oregon and Stanford) and the SEC (Arkansas and Florida). Two non-football conferences also had two teams involved—the Big East (Butler and DePaul) and the West Coast Conference (Gonzaga and Portland). The remaining participants were UConn from the American Athletic Conference and Portland State from the Big Sky Conference. Georgetown was originally announced as a participant in the tournament, but withdrew from the tournament in July. DePaul replaced them in the tournament.

The teams were divided into two separate brackets: the Victory and Motion Brackets. Teams from the same conference were placed in separate brackets to avoid non-league sanctioned matchups. The field included 10 of the previous 14 National Champions and three of the Final Four participants from the 2017 NCAA tournament (North Carolina, Gonzaga, and Oregon). The two eight-team brackets ran simultaneously in the Moda Center and Veterans Memorial Coliseum with the crowning of two champions.

Michigan State won the Victory Bracket while Duke won the Motion Bracket. The tournament was called the best in-season tournament ever due to the quality of the teams participating.

Round robin sub-regional games were also played in Nashville, Tennessee on November 24 and 25. Furman, New Hampshire, Northeastern, and Utah State participated with the games held at the Nashville Municipal Auditorium.

=== Victory Bracket ===
==== Campus site games ====
Game 1 November 12; SEC Network		Game 2 November 14; SportsNet New York
		Stony Brook	62
Bucknell	73	UConn	72
Arkansas	101

Game 3 November 15; ACC Network Extra			Game 4 November 15; Fox Sports Oklahoma / Sooner Sports TV
			Ball State	69
	Bucknell	81	Oklahoma	108
9	North Carolina	93

Game 5 November 17; ESPN 3		Game 8 November 22; Patriot League Network
		Ball State	83
Stony Brook	76	Bucknell	87
Ball State	87

Game 6 November 19; Pac 12 Network		Game 7 November 19; Big Ten Network
			Stony Brook	71
Ball State	71	2	Michigan State	93
Oregon	95

Game 9 November 26
Bucknell	85
Stony Brook	76

==== Championship round ====
Fifth Place Game; November 26
Oklahoma	90
Oregon	80
Seventh Place Game
Portland	69
DePaul	82

Consolation Second Round; November 24
Portland	71
Oklahoma	93
DePaul	79
Oregon	89*

Quarterfinals; November 23
9	North Carolina	102
Portland	78
Arkansas	92
Oklahoma	83
DePaul	51
4	Michigan State	73
UConn	71
Oregon	63

Semifinals; November 24
9	North Carolina	87
Arkansas	69
4	Michigan State	77
UConn	57

Championship; November 26
9	North Carolina	45
4	Michigan State	63
Third Place Game
Arkansas	102
UConn	67

==== All-Tournament team ====
Player	School
Cassius Winston (MVP)	Michigan State
Jaylen Barford	Arkansas
Trae Young	Oklahoma
Luke Maye	North Carolina
Joshua Langford	Michigan State

=== Motion Bracket ===
==== Campus site games ====
Game 1 November 14; Longhorn Network		Game 2 November 17; Pac 12 Network
		Northeastern	59
New Hampshire	60	Stanford	73
Texas	78

Game 3 November 18; Fox Sports 2		Game 4 November 18; KHQ/RTNW
			Utah State	66
Furman	65	17	Gonzaga	79
Butler	82

Game 5 November 19; Big Ten Network +		Game 6 November 19; SEC Network
			New Hampshire	63
Northeastern	55	8	Florida	70
Ohio State	80

Game 7 November 20; ACC Network Extra			Game 8 November 20
			Utah State	79
	Furman	63	Portland State	83
1	Duke	92

==== Championship round ====
Fifth Place Game; November 26
Butler	67*
Ohio State	66
Seventh Place Game
Portland State	87
Stanford	78

Consolation Second Round; November 24
Portland State	69
Butler	71
Stanford	71
Ohio State	79

Quarterfinals; November 23
1	Duke	99
Portland State	81
Butler	48
Texas	61
7	Florida	108
Stanford	87
17	Gonzaga	86
Ohio State	59

Semifinals; November 24
1	Duke	85*
Texas	78
7	Florida	111**
17	Gonzaga	105

Championship; November 26
1	Duke	87
7	Florida	84
Third Place Game
Texas	71
17	Gonzaga	76*

==== All-Tournament team ====
Player	School
Marvin Bagley III (MVP)	Duke
KeVaughn Allen	Florida
Chris Chiozza	Florida
Jalen Hudson	Florida
Johnathan Williams	Gonzaga

=== Sub-regional games ===
Sub-Regional Game 1 November 24		Sub-Regional Game 2 November 24
		Northeastern	67
New Hampshire	64	Utah State	71
Furman	78

Sub-Regional Game 3 November 25		Sub-Regional Game 4 November 25
		Furman	78
Utah State	77	Northeastern	67
New Hampshire	63

== 2019 event ==
On March 6, 2019, Nike and ESPN announced the event will return as a one-day, four-team invitational tournament to be held at the Moda Center. The four teams that participated were: Memphis, Oklahoma, Oregon, and Oregon State. The event consisted of only two games with Oregon defeating Memphis and Oklahoma defeating Oregon State.

=== 2019 bracket ===
November 12
14	Oregon	82
13	Memphis	74

November 12
Oklahoma	77
Oregon State	69

== 2022 event ==
On February 15, 2022, it was announced that the event would return in honor of Knight's 85th birthday. For the first time, the event included women's teams. There were two separate events for each gender: the Phil Knight Invitational and the Phil Knight Legacy tournaments. The events were held from November 24 through 27, 2022. All events were played in a bracket-style format, with the men's teams playing three games apiece and the women's teams playing two games. The events took place at three Portland venues: the University of Portland's Chiles Center, the Moda Center, and Veterans Memorial Coliseum (VMC). For the first two rounds of the men's brackets, the top half of the bracket played during the afternoon sessions and the bottom half of the bracket during the evening sessions. The championship and consolation games for all brackets were played at the same locations, with the Invitational tournament in the afternoon session and the Legacy tournament in the evening session. The championship and consolation games for the women's brackets were played before the corresponding game for the men.

=== Phil Knight Invitational tournament ===
==== Men's bracket ====
Game recaps:

5th Place Game; November 27; Chiles Center
Portland	77
12	Michigan State	78
7th Place Game – Chiles
Villanova	67
Oregon	74

Consolation Semifinals; November 25; VMC
Portland	83
Villanova	71
Oregon	70
12	Michigan State	74

First Round; November 24; Moda Center
1	North Carolina	89
Portland	81
Villanova	79
Iowa State	81*
20	UConn	83
Oregon	59
12	Michigan State	70
18	Alabama	81

Semifinals; November 25; VMC
1	North Carolina	65
Iowa State	70
20	UConn	82
18	Alabama	67

Championship; November 27; Moda Center
Iowa State	53
20	UConn	71
3rd Place Game – VMC
1	North Carolina	101
18	Alabama	103****

* – Denotes overtime period

==== Women's bracket ====
Game recaps:

Semifinals; November 24; Chiles Center
8	North Carolina	85
18	Oregon	79
5	Iowa State	80
Michigan State	49

Championship Game; November 27; Moda Center
8	North Carolina	73
5	Iowa State	64
Consolation – VMC
18	Oregon	86
Michigan State	78

=== Phil Knight Legacy tournament ===
==== Men's bracket ====
Game recaps:

5th Place Game; November 27; Chiles Center
Florida	55
West Virginia	84
7th Place Game – Chiles
Oregon State	71
Portland State	83

Consolation Semifinals; November 25; Moda Center
Oregon State	68
Florida	81
West Virginia	89
Portland State	71

First Round; November 24; VMC
8	Duke	54
Oregon State	51
Xavier	90
Florida	83
24	Purdue	80
West Virginia	68
6	Gonzaga	102
Portland State	78

Semifinals; November 25; Moda Center
8	Duke	71
Xavier	64
24	Purdue	84
6	Gonzaga	66

Championship; November 27; Moda Center
8	Duke	56
24	Purdue	75
3rd Place Game – VMC
Xavier	84
6	Gonzaga	88

==== Women's bracket ====
Game recaps:

Semifinals; November 25; Chiles Center
3	UConn	78
Duke	50
9	Iowa	73
Oregon State	59

Championship Game; November 27; Moda Center
3	UConn	86
9	Iowa	79
Consolation – VMC
Duke	54
Oregon State	41
