= 2017–18 Saint Mary's Gaels men's basketball team =

American college basketball season

2017–18 Saint Mary's Gaels men's basketball

NIT, Quarterfinals
- Conference: West Coast Conference

Ranking
- AP: No. 25
- Record: 30–6 (16–2 WCC)
- Head coach: Randy Bennett (17th season)
- Assistant coaches: Marty Clarke; Marcus Schroeder; Danny Yoshikawa
- Home arena: McKeon Pavilion

2017–18 West Coast Conference men's basketball standings
	Conf.				Overall
Team	W		L	PCT	W		L	PCT
No. 8 Gonzaga †	17	–	1	.944	32	–	5	.865
No. 25 Saint Mary's	16	–	2	.889	30	–	6	.833
BYU	11	–	7	.611	24	–	11	.686
San Diego	9	–	9	.500	20	–	14	.588
San Francisco	9	–	9	.500	22	–	17	.564
Pacific	9	–	9	.500	14	–	18	.438
Santa Clara	8	–	10	.444	11	–	20	.355
Loyola Marymount	5	–	13	.278	11	–	20	.355
Portland	4	–	14	.222	10	–	22	.313
Pepperdine	2	–	16	.111	6	–	26	.188
† Conference tournament winner Rankings from AP poll

The 2017–18 Saint Mary's Gaels men's basketball team represented Saint Mary's College of California during the 2017–18 NCAA Division I men's basketball season. The team was led by head coach Randy Bennett in his 17th season at Saint Mary's. The Gaels played their home games at the McKeon Pavilion in Moraga, California as members of the West Coast Conference. They finished the season 30–6, 16–2 in West Coast Conference play to finish in second place. As the No. 2 seed in the WCC tournament, they defeated Pepperdine in the quarterfinals before losing to BYU in the semifinals. They were one of the last four teams not selected for the NCAA tournament and as a result earned a No. 1 seed in the National Invitation Tournament where they defeated Southeastern Louisiana in the first round and Washington in the second round before losing to Utah in the quarterfinals.

== Previous season ==
The Gaels finished the 2016–17 season 29–5, 16–2 in WCC play to finish in second place. In the WCC tournament, they defeated Portland and BYU before losing to Gonzaga in the championship game. They received an at-large bid to the NCAA tournament. As the No. 7 seed in the West region, they beat VCU in the first round before losing to No. 2-seeded Arizona in the second round.

== Offseason ==
=== Departures ===
Name	Number	Pos.	Height	Weight	Year	Hometown	Reason for departure
Stefan Gonzalez	2	G	6'2"	195	Sophomore	Pocatello, ID	Transferred to UC Davis
Dane Pineau	22	F	6'9"	225	Senior	Melbourne, Australia	Graduated
Joe Rahon	25	G	6'2"	195	RS Senior	San Diego, CA	Graduated

=== Incoming transfers ===
Name	Number	Pos.	Height	Weight	Year	Hometown	Previous school
Cullen Neal	44	G	6'5"	195	RS Senior	Albuquerque, NM	Transferred from Ole Miss. Will eligible to play since Neal graduated from Mississippi.
Malik Fitts		F	6'8"	237	Sophomore	Rancho Cucamonga, CA	Transferred from South Florida. Under NCAA transfer rules, Fitts will have to sit out for the 2017–18 season. Will have three years of remaining eligibility.

=== 2017 recruiting class ===
College recruiting information
Name	Hometown	School	Height	Weight	Commit date
Kristers Zoriks #46 PG	Dobele, Latvia	New Hampton School	6 ft 3 in (1.91 m)	170 lb (77 kg)	Sep 20, 2016
Kristers Zoriks #46 PG	Recruit ratings: Scout: Rivals: (78)				
Overall recruit ranking: Scout: nr Rivals: nr ESPN: nr
Note: In many cases, Scout, Rivals, 247Sports, On3, and ESPN may conflict in their listings of height and weight.; In these cases, the average was taken. ESPN grades are on a 100-point scale.; Sources: "ESPN". ESPN.; "2017 Team Ranking". Rivals.

== Roster ==
2017–18 Saint Mary's Gaels men's basketball team
Players
Coaches

Pos.	#	Name	Height	Weight	Year	Previous school	Hometown
G	00	Tanner Krebs	6 ft 6 in (1.98 m)	200 lb (91 kg)	RS So	Lake Ginninderra College	Hobart, Australia
C	1	Jordan Hunter	6 ft 10 in (2.08 m)	230 lb (104 kg)	Jr	St. Ignatius College	Vaucluse, NSW, Australia
G	3	Emmett Naar	6 ft 1 in (1.85 m)	195 lb (88 kg)	RS Sr	Sydney Boys	Sydney, Australia
C	5	Jock Perry	7 ft 1 in (2.16 m)	260 lb (118 kg)	RS Fr	Lake Ginninderra College	Melbourne, Australia
F	10	Elijah Thomas	6 ft 5 in (1.96 m)	210 lb (95 kg)	RS Fr	Sunrise Mountain	Peoria, AZ
G	12	Tommy Kuhse (W)	6 ft 2 in (1.88 m)	185 lb (84 kg)	RS Fr	Mountain View	Mesa, AZ
F	15	Dan Sheets (W)	6 ft 5 in (1.96 m)	200 lb (91 kg)	RS So	Dougherty Valley	San Ramon, CA
C	21	Evan Fitzner	6 ft 10 in (2.08 m)	230 lb (104 kg)	RS Jr	Francis Parker School	San Diego, CA
G	23	Kristers Zoriks	6 ft 3 in (1.91 m)	170 lb (77 kg)	Fr	New Hampton School	Dobele, Latvia
F	24	Calvin Hermanson	6 ft 6 in (1.98 m)	200 lb (91 kg)	RS Sr	Lake Oswego	Lake Oswego, OR
G	30	Jordan Ford	6 ft 1 in (1.85 m)	160 lb (73 kg)	So	Folsom	Folsom, CA
F	33	Kyle Clark	6 ft 7 in (2.01 m)	215 lb (98 kg)	Jr	Hellyer College	Wynyard, TAS, Australia
C	34	Jock Landale	6 ft 11 in (2.11 m)	255 lb (116 kg)	Sr	Geelong Grammar	Malvern East, VIC, Australia
G	44	Cullen Neal	6 ft 4 in (1.93 m)	191 lb (87 kg)	RS Sr	Eldorado HS; Ole Miss	Albuquerque, NM
F		Malik Fitts (redshirt)	6 ft 8 in (2.03 m)	237 lb (108 kg)	So	Brewster Academy; South Florida	Rancho Cucamonga, CA

Head coach

- Randy Bennett (UC San Diego)

Assistant coach(es)

- Marty Clarke (Victoria)
- Marcus Schroeder (Princeton)
- Danny Yoshikawa (UC Davis)

Legend

- (C) Team captain
- (S) Suspended
- (I) Ineligible
- (W) Walk-on
- Injured
- Current redshirt

Roster

== Schedule and results ==
Date time, TV	Rank^{#}	Opponent^{#}	Result	Record	Site (attendance) city, state
Exhibition
Oct 25, 2017*; 8:00 pm		Fresno State; North Bay Fire relief	W 85–76		McKeon Pavilion; Moraga, CA
Non-conference regular season
Nov 11, 2017*; 5:00 pm	No. 22	Saint Francis (PA)	W 85–68	1–0	McKeon Pavilion (3,276); Moraga, CA
Nov 13, 2017*; 7:00 pm, CHN	No. 21	New Mexico State	W 92–74	2–0	McKeon Pavilion (2,811); Moraga, CA
Nov 15, 2017*; 7:00 pm	No. 21	Cal State Fullerton	W 76–57	3–0	McKeon Pavilion (2,769); Moraga, CA
Nov 19, 2017*; 5:00 pm, Stadium	No. 21	at San Jose State	W 79–61	4–0	Event Center Arena (2,377); San Jose, CA
Nov 23, 2017*; 1:00 pm, ESPNews	No. 21	vs. Harvard; Wooden Legacy quarterfinals	W 89–71	5–0	Titan Gym (2,131); Fullerton, CA
Nov 24, 2017*; 10:30 am, ESPNews	No. 21	vs. Washington State; Wooden Legacy semifinals	L 79–84	5–1	Titan Gym (2,513); Fullerton, CA
Nov 26, 2017*; 2:00 pm, ESPNU	No. 21	vs. Georgia; Wooden Legacy 3rd place game	L 81–83 ^{OT}	5–2	Titan Gym (1,733); Fullerton, CA
Dec 2, 2017*; 8:00 pm, P12N		at California	W 74–63	6–2	Haas Pavilion (7,831); Berkeley, CA
Dec 5, 2017*; 7:00 pm		Sacramento State; Wooden Legacy unbracketed game	W 70–54	7–2	McKeon Pavilion (2,588); Moraga, CA
Dec 9, 2017*; 5:00 pm		Seattle	W 97–73	8–2	McKeon Pavilion (3,324); Moraga, CA
Dec 16, 2017*; 5:00 pm		UC Irvine	W 73–66	9–2	McKeon Pavilion (2,809); Moraga, CA
Dec 19, 2017*; 7:00 pm, NBCSBA		Dayton	W 69–54	10–2	McKeon Pavilion (3,500); Moraga, CA
Dec 22, 2017*; 7:00 pm, CHN		UNC Asheville	W 95–69	11–2	McKeon Pavilion (3,221); Moraga, CA
WCC regular season
Dec 28, 2017; 8:00 pm, NBCSBA		Loyola Marymount	W 87–59	12–2 (1–0)	McKeon Pavilion (3,062); Moraga, CA
Dec 30, 2017; 1:00 pm, ESPNU		at BYU	W 74–64 ^{OT}	13–2 (2–0)	Marriott Center (16,212); Provo, UT
Jan 4, 2018; 7:00 pm		Pacific	W 74–56	14–2 (3–0)	McKeon Pavilion (2,752); Moraga, CA
Jan 6, 2018; 8:00 pm, NBCSBA		San Diego	W 70–63	15–2 (4–0)	McKeon Pavilion (3,317); Moraga, CA
Jan 11, 2018; 8:00 pm, ESPNU		at Santa Clara	W 81–57	16–2 (5–0)	Leavey Center (2,871); Santa Clara, CA
Jan 13, 2018; 5:00 pm, NBCSBA+		at Pepperdine	W 91–67	17–2 (6–0)	Firestone Fieldhouse (1,574); Malibu, CA
Jan 18, 2018; 6:00 pm, ESPN		at No. 13 Gonzaga; Rivalry	W 74–71	18–2 (7–0)	McCarthey Athletic Center (6,000); Spokane, WA
Jan 20, 2018; 7:00 pm		at Pacific	W 72–69	19–2 (8–0)	Alex G. Spanos Center (3,306); Stockton, CA
Jan 25, 2018; 8:00 pm, ESPN2	No. 16	BYU	W 75–62	20–2 (9–0)	McKeon Pavilion (3,500); Moraga, CA
Jan 27, 2018; 8:00 pm, NBCSCA	No. 16	Portland	W 72–55	21–2 (10–0)	McKeon Pavilion (3,500); Moraga, CA
Feb 1, 2018; 8:00 pm, ESPNU	No. 13	San Francisco	W 79–43	22–2 (11–0)	McKeon Pavilion (3,258); Moraga, CA
Feb 3, 2018; 7:00 pm, NBCSCA	No. 13	at San Diego	W 65–62	23–2 (12–0)	Jenny Craig Pavilion (3,152); San Diego, CA
Feb 8, 2018; 7:00 pm	No. 11	at Loyola Marymount	W 83–62	24–2 (13–0)	Gersten Pavilion (1,258); Los Angeles, CA
Feb 10, 2018; 7:00 pm, ESPN2	No. 11	No. 12 Gonzaga; Rivalry	L 65–78	24–3 (13–1)	McKeon Pavilion (3,500); Moraga, CA
Feb 15, 2018; 8:00 pm, ESPNU	No. 15	at San Francisco	L 63–70	24–4 (13–2)	War Memorial Gymnasium (2,679); San Francisco, CA
Feb 17, 2018; 7:00 pm, NBCSBA	No. 15	at Portland	W 73–61	25–4 (14–2)	Chiles Center (4,547); Portland, OR
Feb 22, 2018; 7:00 pm	No. 22	Pepperdine	W 75–61	26–4 (15–2)	McKeon Pavilion (3,167); Moraga, CA
Feb 24, 2018; 3:00 pm, NBCSCA	No. 22	Santa Clara	W 67–40	27–4 (16–2)	McKeon Pavilion (3,500); Moraga, CA
WCC tournament
Mar 3, 2018; 9:00 pm, ESPN2	(2) No. 22	vs. (10) Pepperdine; Quarterfinals	W 69–66	28–4	Orleans Arena (7,279); Las Vegas, NV
Mar 5, 2018; 9:00 pm, ESPN2	(2) No. 20	vs. (3) BYU; Semifinals	L 72–85	28–5	Orleans Arena (8,296); Las Vegas, NV
NIT
Mar 13, 2018*; 7:00 pm, ESPNU	(1) No. 25	(8) Southeastern Louisiana; First Round – Saint Mary's Bracket	W 89–45	29–5	McKeon Pavilion (1,249); Moraga, CA
Mar 19, 2018*; 8:00 pm, ESPNU	(1) No. 25	(5) Washington; Second Round – Saint Mary's Bracket	W 85–81	30–5	McKeon Pavilion (2,274); Moraga, CA
Mar 21, 2018*; 7:00 pm, ESPN	(1) No. 25	(2) Utah; Quarterfinals – Saint Mary's Bracket	L 58–67 ^{OT}	30–6	McKeon Pavilion (2,309); Moraga, CA
*Non-conference game. ^{#}Rankings from AP Poll. (#) Tournament seedings in parentheses. All times are in Pacific Time.

== Rankings ==
Ranking movements Legend: ██ Increase in ranking ██ Decrease in ranking — = Not ranked RV = Received votes
	Week																			
Poll	Pre	1	2	3	4	5	6	7	8	9	10	11	12	13	14	15	16	17	18	Final
AP	22	22	21	21	RV	—	—	—	—	—	RV	16	13	11	15	22	22	20	25	Not released
Coaches	22	22	22*	21	RV	RV	RV	RV	—	RV	RV	18	14	12	15	20	20	19	23	RV

*AP does not release post-NCAA tournament rankings
