= 2017–18 San Francisco Dons men's basketball team =

American college basketball season

2017–18 San Francisco Dons men's basketball
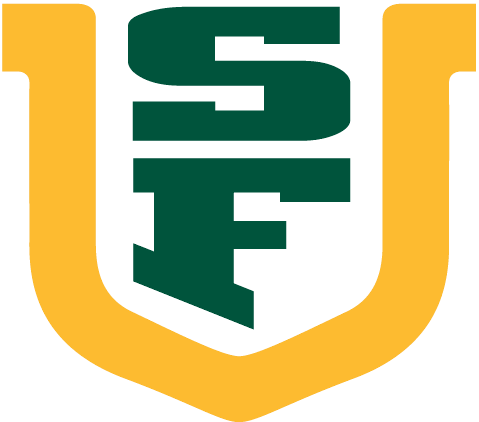

CBI, runner-up
- Conference: West Coast Conference
- Record: 22–17 (9–9 WCC)
- Head coach: Kyle Smith (2nd season)
- Associate head coach: Derrick Phelps; Todd Golden
- Assistant coach: Kevin Hovde
- Home arena: War Memorial Gymnasium

2017–18 West Coast Conference men's basketball standings
	Conf.				Overall
Team	W		L	PCT	W		L	PCT
No. 8 Gonzaga †	17	–	1	.944	32	–	5	.865
No. 25 Saint Mary's	16	–	2	.889	30	–	6	.833
BYU	11	–	7	.611	24	–	11	.686
San Diego	9	–	9	.500	20	–	14	.588
San Francisco	9	–	9	.500	22	–	17	.564
Pacific	9	–	9	.500	14	–	18	.438
Santa Clara	8	–	10	.444	11	–	20	.355
Loyola Marymount	5	–	13	.278	11	–	20	.355
Portland	4	–	14	.222	10	–	22	.313
Pepperdine	2	–	16	.111	6	–	26	.188
† Conference tournament winner Rankings from AP poll

The 2017–18 San Francisco Dons men's basketball team represented the University of San Francisco during the 2017–18 NCAA Division I men's basketball season. The Dons, led by second-year head coach Kyle Smith, played their home games at the War Memorial Gymnasium as members of the West Coast Conference (WCC). They finished the season 22–17, 9–9 in WCC play, to finish in a three-way tie for fourth place. They defeated Pacific in the quarterfinals of the WCC tournament before losing in the semifinals to Gonzaga. They were invited to the College Basketball Invitational where they defeated Colgate, Utah Valley and Campbell to advance to the best-of-three championship series against North Texas where they won game 1 before losing games 2 and 3.

== Previous season ==
The Dons finished the 2016–17 season 20–13, 10–8 in WCC play, to finish tied for fourth place in the conference. They lost in the quarterfinals of the WCC tournament to Santa Clara. They were invited to the College Basketball Invitational where they lost in the first round to Rice.

== Offseason ==
=== Departures ===
Name	Number	Pos.	Height	Weight	Year	Hometown	Reason for departure
Maquill Smith	0	G	6'4"	175	Sophomore	Miami, FL	Graduate transferred to West Georgia
Ronnie Boyce	3	G	6'3"	158	Senior	Oklahoma City, OK	Graduated
Chance Anderson	12	F	6'7"	215	Freshman	Alpharetta, GA	Transferred to Columbia State CC
Garrett Turner	30	G	5'10"	151	Freshman	Boulder, CO	Walk-on; did not return
Sasha French	33	C	6'11"	216	Freshman	Napa, CA	Walk-on; transferred to Napa Valley College

=== Incoming transfers ===
Name	Number	Pos.	Height	Weight	Year	Hometown	Previous school
Erik Poulsen	31	C	6'11"	235	Sophomore	Santa Rosa, CA	Junior college transferred from Santa Rosa JC

=== 2017 recruiting class ===
College recruiting information
Name	Hometown	School	Height	Weight	Commit date
Souley Boum; PG	Oakland, CA	Oakland Technical High School	6 ft 2 in (1.88 m)	N/A	Sep 29, 2016
Souley Boum; PG	Recruit ratings: Scout: Rivals: (NR)				
Jamaree Bouyea; SG	Seaside, CA	Palma High School	6 ft 2 in (1.88 m)	155 lb (70 kg)	
Jamaree Bouyea; SG	Recruit ratings: Scout: Rivals: (NR)				
Taavi Jurkatamm; PF	Tallinn, Estonia		6 ft 9 in (2.06 m)	210 lb (95 kg)	
Taavi Jurkatamm; PF	Recruit ratings: Scout: Rivals: (NR)				
Overall recruit ranking: Scout: nr Rivals: nr ESPN: nr
Note: In many cases, Scout, Rivals, 247Sports, On3, and ESPN may conflict in their listings of height and weight.; In these cases, the average was taken. ESPN grades are on a 100-point scale.; Sources: "San Francisco Dons 2017 Basketball Commitments". Rivals.; "2017 San Francisco Dons Basketball Commits". Scout.; "ESPN". ESPN.; "Scout.com Team Recruiting Rankings". Scout.; "2017 Team Ranking". Rivals.

== Roster ==
2017–18 San Francisco Dons men's basketball team
Players
Coaches

Pos.	#	Name	Height	Weight	Year	Previous school	Hometown
G	0	Souley Boum	6 ft 3 in (1.91 m)	145 lb (66 kg)	Fr	Oakland Tech	Oakland, CA
G	1	Jamaree Bouyea	6 ft 2 in (1.88 m)	155 lb (70 kg)	Fr	Palma	Seaside, CA
G	2	Frankie Ferrari	5 ft 11 in (1.8 m)	179 lb (81 kg)	Jr	Burlingame	Burlingame, CA
G	3	Michael Orlich (W)	5 ft 11 in (1.8 m)	180 lb (82 kg)	So	Clovis West; De Anza College	Fresno, CA
C	5	Jimbo Lull	7 ft 0 in (2.13 m)	252 lb (114 kg)	So	New Hampton School	Manhattan Beach, CA
F	10	Matt McCarthy	6 ft 9 in (2.06 m)	232 lb (105 kg)	Jr	Xavier College	Melbourne, Australia
F	11	Remu Raitanen	6 ft 9 in (2.06 m)	198 lb (90 kg)	So	Helsinki Basketball Academy	Helsinki, Finland
G	14	Charles Minlend	6 ft 4 in (1.93 m)	208 lb (94 kg)	So	Fork Union Military Academy	Concord, NC
F	15	Nate Renfro	6 ft 7 in (2.01 m)	186 lb (84 kg)	Jr	Sahuaro	Tucson, AZ
F	22	Chase Foster	6 ft 5 in (1.96 m)	187 lb (85 kg)	Sr	Valor Christian	Highlands Ranch, CO
G	25	Jordan Ratinho	6 ft 5 in (1.96 m)	210 lb (95 kg)	So	De La Salle	Livermore, CA
G	30	Mars Pasache (W)	6 ft 1 in (1.85 m)	175 lb (79 kg)	Sr	Stuart Hall	San Francisco, CA
C	31	Erik Poulsen	6 ft 11 in (2.11 m)	235 lb (107 kg)	So	Montgomery; Santa Rosa JC	Santa Rosa, CA
F	34	Taavi Jurkatamm	6 ft 9 in (2.06 m)	210 lb (95 kg)	Fr	Audentes Sports Gymnasium	Tallinn, Estonia
F	44	Nick Loew (W)	6 ft 8 in (2.03 m)	220 lb (100 kg)	Jr	Burlingame	Burlingame, CA
G	45	Mladen Djordjevic	6 ft 3 in (1.91 m)	184 lb (83 kg)	Jr	Tamiš Club	Belgrade, Serbia

Head coach

- Kyle Smith (Hamilton)

Assistant coach(es)

- Derrick Phelps (North Carolina)
- Todd Golden (Saint Mary's)
- Kevin Hovde (Richmond)

Legend

- (C) Team captain
- (S) Suspended
- (I) Ineligible
- (W) Walk-on
- Injured
- Current redshirt

Roster
Last update: September 15, 2024

== Schedule and results ==
Date time, TV	Rank^{#}	Opponent^{#}	Result	Record	Site (attendance) city, state
Non-conference regular season
November 10, 2017*; 8:00 p.m.		Long Beach State	L 71–83	0–1	War Memorial Gymnasium (2,496); San Francisco, CA
November 13, 2017*; 7:00 p.m.		Saint Francis (PA)	W 75–63	1–1	War Memorial Gymnasium (1,018); San Francisco, CA
November 17, 2017*; 7:00 p.m.		Sacramento State	W 69–56	2–1	War Memorial Gymnasium (1,804); San Francisco, CA
November 21, 2017*; 7:00 p.m.		Sonoma State	W 78–55	3–1	War Memorial Gymnasium (1,328); San Francisco, CA
November 28, 2017*; 7:00 p.m.		UC Santa Barbara	L 72–79	3–2	War Memorial Gymnasium (1,720); San Francisco, CA
December 2, 2017*; 6:00 p.m., P12N		at No. 20 Arizona State	L 57–75	3–3	Wells Fargo Arena (8,682); Tempe, AZ
December 4, 2017*; 7:00 p.m.		Central Arkansas	W 78–76	4–3	War Memorial Gymnasium (1,087); San Francisco, CA
December 7, 2017*; 7:00 p.m.		Eastern Washington	W 81–71	5–3	War Memorial Gymnasium (1,137); San Francisco, CA
December 15, 2017*; 8:00 p.m.		UC Davis; Las Vegas Classic	W 74–61	6–3	War Memorial Gymnasium (2,231); San Francisco, CA
December 17, 2017*; 3:00 p.m., ESPNU		at Stanford	L 59–71	6–4	Maples Pavilion (4,031); Stanford, CA
December 19, 2017*; 7:00 p.m.		Radford; Las Vegas Classic	W 52–41	7–4	War Memorial Gymnasium (1,004); San Francisco, CA
December 22, 2017*; 5:30 p.m., FS2		vs. Duquesne; Las Vegas Classic	L 65–67	7–5	Orleans Arena; Paradise, NV
December 23, 2017*; 8:00 p.m., FS1		vs. Nevada; Las Vegas Classic	W 66–64	8–5	Orleans Arena; Paradise, NV
WCC regular season
December 28, 2017; 6:00 p.m., NBCSCA+		at San Diego	L 63–73	8–6 (0–1)	Jenny Craig Pavilion (1,817); San Diego, CA
December 30, 2017; 6:00 p.m., NBCSCA		at Portland	W 84–61	9–6 (1–1)	Chiles Center (2,007); Portland, OR
January 4, 2018; 8:00 p.m., NBCSCA		BYU	L 59–69	9–7 (1–2)	War Memorial Gymnasium (1,837); San Francisco, CA
January 6, 2018; 1:00 p.m., NBCSCA		at Pepperdine	W 80–67	10–7 (2–2)	Firestone Fieldhouse (795); Malibu, CA
January 11, 2018; 7:30 p.m., NBCSCA		at Loyola Marymount	L 65–67	10–8 (2–3)	Gersten Pavilion (1,032); Los Angeles, CA
January 13, 2018; 6:30 p.m., ESPNU		No. 15 Gonzaga	L 65–75	10–9 (2–4)	War Memorial Gymnasium (4,022); San Francisco, CA
January 18, 2018; 8:00 p.m., NBCSBA		Santa Clara	L 62–65	10–10 (2–5)	War Memorial Gymnasium (1,508); San Francisco, CA
January 20, 2018; 7:00 p.m.		Pepperdine	W 80–73	11–10 (3–5)	War Memorial Gymnasium (2,116); San Francisco, CA
January 25, 2018; 7:00 p.m.		Pacific	W 69–67	12–10 (4–5)	War Memorial Gymnasium (1,808); San Francisco, CA
January 27, 2018; 5:00 p.m., NBCSCA		at No. 15 Gonzaga	L 73–82	12–11 (4–6)	McCarthey Athletic Center (6,000); Spokane, WA
February 1, 2018; 8:00 p.m., ESPNU		at No. 13 Saint Mary's	L 43–79	12–12 (4–7)	McKeon Pavilion (3,258); Moraga, CA
February 3, 2018; 8:00 p.m., NBCSCA		at Santa Clara	W 70–59	13–12 (5–7)	Leavey Center (2,876); Santa Clara, CA
February 8, 2018; 7:00 p.m.		Portland	W 65–63	14–12 (6–7)	War Memorial Gymnasium (1,262); San Francisco, CA
February 10, 2018; 1:00 p.m., NBCSCA		at BYU	L 73–75 ^{OT}	14–13 (6–8)	Marriott Center (12,815); Provo, UT
February 15, 2018; 8:00 p.m., ESPNU		No. 15 Saint Mary's	W 70–63	15–13 (7–8)	War Memorial Gymnasium (2,679); San Francisco, CA
February 17, 2018; 3:00 p.m., NBCSCA		Loyola Marymount	W 72–63	16–13 (8–8)	War Memorial Gymnasium (1,882); San Francisco, CA
February 22, 2018; 7:00 p.m.		at Pacific	W 84–74	17–13 (9–8)	Alex G. Spanos Center (1,661); Stockton, CA
February 24, 2017; 7:00 p.m.		San Diego	L 61–64	17–14 (9–9)	War Memorial Gymnasium (1,796); San Francisco, CA
WCC tournament
March 3, 2018; 3:00 p.m., NBCSCA	(4)	vs. (5) Pacific; Quarterfinals	W 71–70 ^{OT}	18–14	Orleans Arena (7,142); Paradise, NV
March 5, 2018; 6:00 p.m., ESPN	(4)	vs. (1) No. 6 Gonzaga; Semifinals	L 60–88	18–15	Orleans Arena (8,296); Paradise, NV
CBI
March 14, 2018*; 7:00 p.m.		Colgate; First round	W 72–68	19–15	War Memorial Gymnasium (1,339); San Francisco, CA
March 19, 2018*; 7:00 p.m.		Utah Valley; Quarterfinals	W 78–73	20–15	War Memorial Gymnasium (1,239); San Francisco, CA
March 22, 2018*; 7:00 p.m., ESPN3		Campbell; Semifinals	W 65–62	21–15	War Memorial Gymnasium (1,163); San Francisco, CA
March 26, 2018*; 7:00 p.m., ESPNU		North Texas; Finals – Game 1	W 72–62	22–15	War Memorial Gymnasium (1,358); San Francisco, CA
March 28, 2018*; 5:30 p.m., ESPNU		at North Texas; Finals – Game 2	L 55–69	22–16	The Super Pit (4,196); Denton, TX
March 30, 2018*; 4:00 p.m., ESPNU		at North Texas; Finals – Game 3	L 77–88	22–17	The Super Pit (6,291); Denton, TX
*Non-conference game. ^{#}Rankings from AP poll. (#) Tournament seedings in parentheses. All times are in Pacific.
