= 2017–18 Gonzaga Bulldogs men's basketball team =

American college basketball season

2017–18 Gonzaga Bulldogs men's basketball

WCC regular season and tournament champions

NCAA tournament, Sweet Sixteen
- Conference: West Coast Conference

Ranking
- Coaches: No. 10
- AP: No. 8
- Record: 32–5 (17–1 WCC)
- Head coach: Mark Few (19th season)
- Assistant coaches: Tommy Lloyd (17th season); Donny Daniels (8th season); Brian Michaelson (5th season)
- Home arena: McCarthey Athletic Center

2017–18 West Coast Conference men's basketball standings
| | Conf. | | | | Overall |
| Team | W | | L | PCT | W | | L | PCT |
|---|---|---|---|---|---|---|---|---|
| No. 8 Gonzaga † | 17 | – | 1 | .944 | 32 | – | 5 | .865 |
| No. 25 Saint Mary's | 16 | – | 2 | .889 | 30 | – | 6 | .833 |
| BYU | 11 | – | 7 | .611 | 24 | – | 11 | .686 |
| San Diego | 9 | – | 9 | .500 | 20 | – | 14 | .588 |
| San Francisco | 9 | – | 9 | .500 | 22 | – | 17 | .564 |
| Pacific | 9 | – | 9 | .500 | 14 | – | 18 | .438 |
| Santa Clara | 8 | – | 10 | .444 | 11 | – | 20 | .355 |
| Loyola Marymount | 5 | – | 13 | .278 | 11 | – | 20 | .355 |
| Portland | 4 | – | 14 | .222 | 10 | – | 22 | .313 |
| Pepperdine | 2 | – | 16 | .111 | 6 | – | 26 | .188 |
† Conference tournament winner Rankings from AP poll

The 2017–18 Gonzaga Bulldogs men's basketball team represented Gonzaga University in the 2017–18 NCAA Division I men's basketball season. The team was led by head coach Mark Few, who was in his 19th season as head coach. The team played its home games at McCarthey Athletic Center in Spokane, Washington. This was the Bulldogs' (also informally referred to as the Zags) 38th season as a member of the West Coast Conference. They finished the season 32–5, 17–1 in WCC play to win the WCC regular season championship. They defeated Loyola Marymount, San Francisco and BYU to become champions of the WCC tournament. They received the WCC's automatic bid to the NCAA tournament, where they defeated UNC Greensboro and Ohio State to advance to the Sweet Sixteen, where they lost to Florida State.

The last weeks of the season were played against the backdrop of a potential Gonzaga move to the Mountain West Conference (MW), first publicly reported by the San Diego Union-Tribune on February 28, 2018. MW commissioner Craig Thompson told the newspaper that the league had discussed expansion with six schools, with Gonzaga the only school he specifically named. Thompson added that Gonzaga could potentially join as a full but non-football member as early as the 2018–19 school year. A later Union-Tribune report indicated that talks were advanced enough that the conference's presidents planned a vote on an invitation to Gonzaga during the MW men's and women's basketball tournaments in Las Vegas, but decided to delay the vote until after the Final Four. However, before the MW's planned vote, Gonzaga athletic director Mike Roth notified both conferences that Gonzaga would remain in the WCC for the immediate future.

== Previous season ==
The Bulldogs team finished the 2016–17 season 37–2, 17–1 in WCC play. This was arguably the greatest season in Gonzaga's 109-year basketball history. The Bulldogs finished with a 32–1 regular season record and did not lose a game until February. They finished ranked second in the final AP Poll, the highest final national ranking in school history. They won both the WCC regular season and tournament championships. As a result, they received the conference's automatic bid to the NCAA Tournament and a received a No. 1 seed in the West region. They advanced to the first NCAA National Championship game in the school's history—the deepest run for a WCC team since San Francisco advanced to its third consecutive Final Four in 1957, and also the deepest run by any Division I school without a football team since Seton Hall made the championship game in 1989. With a victory over South Carolina in the national semifinal, the Bulldogs tied the NCAA Division I record for the second-most wins in a season. Their run ended in the NCAA National Championship game, where they lost to North Carolina.

== Offseason ==
=== Coaching changes ===
==== Departures ====
| Name | Position | Year at Gonzaga | Alma mater (year) | Reason for departure |
|---|---|---|---|---|
| John Jakus | Director of basketball Ooerations | 3rd | Trinity International (1999) | Assistant coach at Baylor |
| Ken Bone | Special assistant to the head coach | 1st | Seattle Pacific (1982) | Associate head coach at Pepperdine |

==== Additions to staff ====
| Name | Position | Year at Gonzaga | Alma mater (year) | Previous job |
|---|---|---|---|---|
| Stephen Gentry | Director of basketball operations | 1st | Gonzaga (2006) | Director of player development at Oklahoma State |

=== Player departures ===
Johnathan Williams had entered the NBA draft but did not hire an agent, giving him the option to return to Gonzaga. He withdrew from the draft on May 24, the last day he could do so to retain NCAA eligibility.

| Name | Number | Pos. | Height | Weight | Year | Hometown | Reason for departure |
|---|---|---|---|---|---|---|---|
| Przemek Karnowski | 24 | C | 7'1" | 300 | Senior (redshirt) | Toruń, Poland | Graduated |
| Rem Bakamus | 15 | G | 6'0" | 173 | Senior (redshirt) | Longview, WA | Graduated |
| Jordan Mathews | 4 | G | 6'4" | 203 | Senior | San Francisco, CA | Completed athletic eligibility; graduated from California in 2016 |
| Nigel Williams-Goss | 5 | G | 6'3" | 195 | Junior (redshirt) | Happy Valley, OR | Graduated; declared for 2017 NBA draft; selected 55th overall by the Utah Jazz |
| Ryan Edwards | 25 | C | 7'1" | 295 | Junior (redshirt) | Kalispell, MT | Graduated; transferred to Portland State |
| Dustin Triano | 55 | G | 6'3" | 180 | Junior (redshirt) | Vancouver, BC | Graduated; transferred to Western Oregon |
| Bryan Alberts | 10 | G | 6'5" | 198 | Sophomore (redshirt) | Northridge, CA | Graduated; transferred to Long Beach State |
| Zach Collins | 32 | C | 7'0" | 230 | Freshman | Las Vegas, NV | Declared for 2017 NBA draft; selected 10th overall by the Sacramento Kings |

=== Incoming transfers ===
| Name | Pos. | Height | Weight | Year | Hometown | Previous school | Years remaining | Date eligible |
|---|---|---|---|---|---|---|---|---|
| Brandon Clarke | F | 6'8" | 210 | Junior | Phoenix, AZ | San Jose State | 2 | Oct. 1, 2018 |
| Alex Martin | G | 6'5" | 205 | Sophomore (redshirt) | Overland Park, KS | Johnson County CC | 3 | Oct. 1, 2017 |

=== 2017 recruiting class ===
College recruiting
| Name | Hometown | School | Height | Weight | Commit date |
|---|---|---|---|---|---|
| Corey Kispert; SF | Seattle, WA | King's HS | 6 ft 7 in (2.01 m) | 215 lb (98 kg) | May 4, 2016 |
| Corey Kispert; SF | Recruit ratings: Scout: Rivals: 247Sports: ESPN: (82) | | | | |
| Joël Ayayi; PG | Bordeaux, France | INSEP | 6 ft 4 in (1.93 m) | 175 lb (79 kg) | Apr 27, 2017 |
| Joël Ayayi; PG | Recruit ratings: Scout: Rivals: 247Sports: ESPN: (NR) | | | | |
Overall recruit ranking:
Note: In many cases, Scout, Rivals, 247Sports, On3, and ESPN may conflict in their listings of height and weight.; In these cases, the average was taken. ESPN grades are on a 100-point scale.; Sources: "2017 Gonzaga Rivals Commits". Rivals.; "2017 Gonzaga Scout Commits". Scout.; "2017 Gonzaga ESPN Commits". ESPN.; "Scout.com Team Recruiting Rankings". Scout.; "2017 Team Ranking". Rivals.; "2017 Gonzaga 24/7 Sports Commits". 247Sports.

=== 2017 returning missionaries ===
Jesse Wade graduated high school in 2015, but before enrolling in college at Gonzaga, he left for a two-year LDS mission in Lyon, France, and would arrive on campus as a freshman in the fall of 2017.

College recruiting
| Name | Hometown | School | Height | Weight | Commit date |
|---|---|---|---|---|---|
| Jesse Wade; PG | Kaysville, UT | Davis | 6 ft 2 in (1.88 m) | 165 lb (75 kg) | Oct 4, 2013 |
| Jesse Wade; PG | Recruit ratings: Scout: Rivals: 247Sports: ESPN: (80) | | | | |
Overall recruit ranking: Scout: N/A Rivals: N/A 247Sports: #110 ESPN: N/A
Note: In many cases, Scout, Rivals, 247Sports, On3, and ESPN may conflict in their listings of height and weight.; In these cases, the average was taken. ESPN grades are on a 100-point scale.; Sources: "2015 Gonzaga Rivals Commits". Rivals.; "2015 Gonzaga Scout Commits". Scout.; "2015 Gonzaga ESPN Commits". ESPN.; "Scout.com Team Recruiting Rankings". Scout.; "2015 Team Ranking". Rivals.; "2015 Gonzaga 24/7 Sports Commits". 247Sports.

== Future recruits ==
=== Recruiting class of 2018 ===
College recruiting (2018)
| Name | Hometown | School | Height | Weight | Commit date |
|---|---|---|---|---|---|
| Filip Petrušev; PF | Belgrade, Serbia | Montverde Academy | 6 ft 10 in (2.08 m) | 215 lb (98 kg) | Oct 22, 2017 |
| Filip Petrušev; PF | Recruit ratings: Scout: Rivals: 247Sports: ESPN: | | | | |
| Greg Foster; SG | Thiensville, WI | Ed W. Clark High School | 6 ft 5 in (1.96 m) | 174 lb (79 kg) | Nov 8, 2017 |
| Greg Foster; SG | Recruit ratings: Scout: Rivals: 247Sports: ESPN: | | | | |
Overall recruit ranking:
Note: In many cases, Scout, Rivals, 247Sports, On3, and ESPN may conflict in their listings of height and weight.; In these cases, the average was taken. ESPN grades are on a 100-point scale.; Sources: "Gonzaga Commit List for 2018". Rivals.; "2018 Team Ranking". Rivals.

== Roster ==
2017–18 Gonzaga Bulldogs men's basketball team
Players
Coaches

| Pos. | # | Name | Height | Weight | Year | Previous school | Hometown |
|---|---|---|---|---|---|---|---|
| F | 3 | Johnathan Williams | 6 ft 9 in (2.06 m) | 228 lb (103 kg) | RS Sr | Southwind; Missouri | Memphis, TN |
| G | 0 | Silas Melson | 6 ft 4 in (1.93 m) | 195 lb (88 kg) | Sr | Jefferson | Portland, OR |
| G | 20 | Brian Pete (W) | 6 ft 1 in (1.85 m) | 185 lb (84 kg) | Sr | Southridge | Portland, OR |
| F | 22 | Jeremy Jones | 6 ft 6 in (1.98 m) | 210 lb (95 kg) | RS Jr | East Central; Rice | San Antonio, TX |
| G | 13 | Josh Perkins | 6 ft 3 in (1.91 m) | 190 lb (86 kg) | RS Jr | Huntington Prep | Park Hill, CO |
| F | 15 | Brandon Clarke (I) (redshirt) | 6 ft 8 in (2.03 m) | 210 lb (95 kg) | Jr | Desert Vista; San Jose State | Phoenix, AZ |
| G | 2 | Jack Beach (W) | 6 ft 3 in (1.91 m) | 180 lb (82 kg) | RS So | Torrey Pines | San Diego, CA |
| G | 5 | Alex Martin (W) | 6 ft 5 in (1.96 m) | 205 lb (93 kg) | RS So | Blue Valley; Belmont; Johnson County CC | Overland Park, KS |
| F | 33 | Killian Tillie | 6 ft 10 in (2.08 m) | 215 lb (98 kg) | So | INSEP | Cagnes-sur-Mer, France |
| F | 21 | Rui Hachimura | 6 ft 8 in (2.03 m) | 225 lb (102 kg) | So | Meisei | Toyama, Japan |
| G | 23 | Zach Norvell | 6 ft 5 in (1.96 m) | 205 lb (93 kg) | RS Fr | Simeon | Chicago, IL |
| C | 14 | Jacob Larsen | 6 ft 11 in (2.11 m) | 227 lb (103 kg) | RS Fr | Falkonergårdens Gymnasium; SISU Copenhagen | Holte, Denmark |
| G | 10 | Jesse Wade | 6 ft 1 in (1.85 m) | 175 lb (79 kg) | Fr | Davis | Kaysville, UT |
| F | 24 | Corey Kispert | 6 ft 6 in (1.98 m) | 215 lb (98 kg) | Fr | King's | Seattle, WA |
| G | 11 | Joël Ayayi (redshirt) | 6 ft 5 in (1.96 m) | 169 lb (77 kg) | Fr | INSEP | Bordeaux, France |

Head coach

- Mark Few (Oregon)

Assistant coach(es)

- Tommy Lloyd (Whitman)
- Donny Daniels (Cal State Fullerton)
- Brian Michaelson (Gonzaga)

Legend

- (C) Team captain
- (S) Suspended
- (I) Ineligible
- (W) Walk-on
- Injured
- Current redshirt

Roster
Last update: February 17, 2018

- Roster is subject to change as/if players transfer or leave the program for other reasons.

=== Coaching staff ===
| Name | Position | Year at Gonzaga | Alma mater (year) |
|---|---|---|---|
| Mark Few | Head coach | 19th | Oregon (1987) |
| Tommy Lloyd | Associate head coach | 17th | Whitman (1998) |
| Donny Daniels | Assistant coach | 8th | Cal State Fullerton (1976) |
| Brian Michaelson | Assistant coach | 5th | Gonzaga (2005) |
| Ken Nakagawa | Graduate assistant | 2nd | Long Beach State (2014) |
| Stephen Gentry | Director of basketball operations | 1st | Gonzaga (2006) |
| Riccardo Fois | Director of analytics | 4th | Pepperdine (2009) |
| Josh Therrien | Athletic trainer | 2nd | Washington State (2007) |
| Travis Knight | Strength and conditioning coach | 12th | Gonzaga (2000) |

== Schedule and results ==
Gonzaga's non-conference schedule included matchups with Washington and San Diego State on the road. Gonzaga hosted Creighton, Texas Southern, and Incarnate Word at home. Gonzaga battled Villanova on a neutral court at Madison Square Garden in the Jimmy V Classic. The Zags were invited to play in the PK80: Phil Knight Invitational, where they played against Florida, Ohio State, and Texas. The Zags played in the single-elimination WCC Tournament, which took place in March 2018 at the Orleans Arena in Las Vegas.

| Date time, TV | Rank^{#} | Opponent^{#} | Result | Record | High points | High rebounds | High assists | Site (attendance) city, state |
Exhibition
| Nov 4, 2017*; 5:00 pm, KHQ | No. 18 | College of Idaho | W 96–67 | | 28 – Tillie | 6 – 3 Tied | 5 – Tied | McCarthey Athletic Center (6,000); Spokane, WA |
Non-conference regular season
| Nov 10*; 6:00 pm, KHQ/RTNW | No. 18 | Texas Southern | W 97–69 | 1–0 | 20 – Perkins | 12 – Tillie | 5 – Norvell | McCarthey Athletic Center (6,000); Spokane, WA |
| Nov 14*; 6:00 pm, KHQ/RTNW | No. 17 | Howard | W 106–69 | 2–0 | 18 – Norvell | 9 – Tied | 6 – Perkins | McCarthey Athletic Center (6,000); Spokane, WA |
| Nov 18*; 7:00 pm, KHQ/RTNW | No. 17 | Utah State; PK80–Phil Knight Invitational Opening Round | W 79–66 | 3–0 | 20 – Tillie | 9 – Tied | 3 – Tied | McCarthey Athletic Center (6,000); Spokane, WA |
| Nov 23*; 9:00 pm, ESPN2 | No. 17 | vs. Ohio State; PK80–Phil Knight Invitational Motion Bracket Quarterfinals | W 86–59 | 4–0 | 21 – Williams | 11 – Tillie | 4 – Tied | Veterans Memorial Coliseum (7,878); Portland, OR |
| Nov 24*; 8:00 pm, ESPN2 | No. 17 | vs. No. 7 Florida; PK80–Phil Knight Invitational Motion Bracket Semifinals | L 105–111 ^{2OT} | 4–1 | 39 – Williams | 12 – Williams | 7 – Perkins | Moda Center (14,274); Portland, OR |
| Nov 26*; 10:00 am, ESPN | No. 17 | vs. Texas; PK80–Phil Knight Invitational Motion Bracket 3rd Place Game | W 76–71 ^{OT} | 5–1 | 20 – Hachimura | 9 – Hachimura | 7 – Perkins | Moda Center (15,365); Portland, OR |
| Nov 29*; 6:00 pm, KHQ/RTNW | No. 15 | Incarnate Word | W 103–68 | 6–1 | 18 – Hachimura | 8 – Larsen | 5 – Norvell | McCarthey Athletic Center (6,000); Spokane, WA |
| Dec 1*; 7:15 pm, ESPN2 | No. 15 | No. 25 Creighton | W 91–74 | 7–1 | 22 – Tillie | 8 – Tillie | 4 – Perkins | McCarthey Athletic Center (6,000); Spokane, WA |
| Dec 5*; 4:00 pm, ESPN | No. 12 | vs. No. 4 Villanova; Jimmy V Classic | L 72–88 | 7–2 | 22 – Norvell Jr. | 5 – Perkins | 5 – Perkins | Madison Square Garden (17,532); New York, NY |
| Dec 10*; 5:00 pm, P12N | No. 12 | at Washington; Rivalry | W 97–70 | 8–2 | 21 – Williams | 12 – Williams | 8 – Perkins | Alaska Airlines Arena (9,749); Seattle, WA |
| Dec 16*; 5:00 pm, KHQ/RTNW | No. 12 | North Dakota | W 89–83 ^{OT} | 9–2 | 20 – Perkins | 9 – Tillie | 7 – Perkins | McCarthey Athletic Center (6,000); Spokane, WA |
| Dec 18*; 6:00 pm, KHQ/RTNW | No. 12 | IUPUI | W 101–71 | 10–2 | 27 – Tillie | 14 – Williams | 6 – Perkins | McCarthey Athletic Center (6,000); Spokane, WA |
| Dec 21*; 7:00 pm, CBSSN | No. 12 | at San Diego State | L 70–72 | 10–3 | 22 – Norvell Jr. | 15 – Williams | 7 – Perkins | Viejas Arena (12,414); San Diego, CA |
WCC regular season
| Dec 28; 6:00 pm, ESPN2 | No. 20 | Pacific | W 81–48 | 11–3 (1–0) | 19 – Hachimura | 6 – Kispert | 5 – Perkins | McCarthey Athletic Center (6,000); Spokane, WA |
| Dec 30; 4:00 pm, KHQ/RTNW | No. 20 | Santa Clara | W 101–52 | 12–3 (2–0) | 19 – Melson | 6 – Tied | 8 – Tied | McCarthey Athletic Center (6,000); Spokane, WA |
| Jan 4, 2018; 8:00 pm, ESPNU | No. 19-t | at Pepperdine | W 89–59 | 13–3 (3–0) | 22 – Tillie | 8 – Tillie | 5 – 3 Tied | Firestone Fieldhouse (2,930); Malibu, CA |
| Jan 6; 7:00 pm, ESPNU | No. 19-t | at Loyola Marymount | W 85–66 | 14–3 (4–0) | 30 – Williams | 10 – Williams | 10 – Perkins | Gersten Pavilion (2,782); Los Angeles, CA |
| Jan 11; 6:00 pm, KHQ/RTNW | No. 15 | Portland | W 103–57 | 15–3 (5–0) | 23 – Melson | 10 – Larsen | 7 – Perkins | McCarthey Athletic Center (6,000); Spokane, WA |
| Jan 13; 6:30 pm, ESPNU | No. 15 | at San Francisco | W 75–65 | 16–3 (6–0) | 17 – Williams | 9 – Williams | 3 – Williams | War Memorial Gymnasium (4,022); San Francisco, CA |
| Jan 18; 6:00 pm, ESPN | No. 13 | Saint Mary's; Rivalry | L 71–74 | 16–4 (6–1) | 23 – Hachimura | 8 – Tillie | 7 – Perkins | McCarthey Athletic Center (6,000); Spokane, WA |
| Jan 20; 5:00 pm, KHQ/RTNW | No. 13 | at Santa Clara | W 75–60 | 17–4 (7–1) | 17 – Perkins | 8 – Williams | 7 – Norvell Jr. | Leavey Center (5,011); Santa Clara, CA |
| Jan 25; 8:00 pm, ESPNU | No. 15 | at Portland | W 95–79 | 18–4 (8–1) | 27 – Tillie | 7 – Tied | 6 – Melson | Chiles Center (4,557); Portland, OR |
| Jan 27; 5:00 pm, KHQ/RTNW | No. 15 | San Francisco | W 82–73 | 19–4 (9–1) | 16 – Tied | 8 – Tillie | 4 – Perkins | McCarthey Athletic Center (6,000); Spokane, WA |
| Feb 1; 6:00 pm, KHQ/RTNW | No. 14 | San Diego | W 69–59 | 20–4 (10–1) | 14 – Williams | 12 – Williams | 2 – 3 Tied | McCarthey Athletic Center (6,000); Spokane, WA |
| Feb 3; 7:00 pm, ESPN2 | No. 14 | BYU; Rivalry | W 68–60 | 21–4 (11–1) | 15 – Hachimura | 10 – Williams | 7 – Perkins | McCarthey Athletic Center (6,000); Spokane, WA |
| Feb 8; 7:00 pm, SWX/RTNW | No. 12 | at Pacific | W 71–61 | 22–4 (12–1) | 21 – Tillie | 13 – Williams | 5 – Perkins | Alex G. Spanos Center (3,453); Stockton, CA |
| Feb 10; 7:00 pm, ESPN2 | No. 12 | at No. 11 Saint Mary's; Rivalry | W 78–65 | 23–4 (13–1) | 21 – Hachimura | 11 – Williams | 5 – Perkins | McKeon Pavilion (3,500); Moraga, CA |
| Feb 15; 6:00 pm, SWX/RTNW | No. 9 | Loyola Marymount | W 76–46 | 24–4 (14–1) | 14 – Kispert | 13 – Williams | 2 – 3 Tied | McCarthey Athletic Center (6,000); Spokane, WA |
| Feb 17; 5:00 pm, KAYU/RTNW | No. 9 | Pepperdine | W 81–67 | 25–4 (15–1) | 18 – Williams | 12 – Williams | 7 – Perkins | McCarthey Athletic Center (6,000); Spokane, WA |
| Feb 22; 6:00 pm, ESPN2 | No. 6-t | at San Diego | W 77–72 | 26–4 (16–1) | 17 – Tillie | 9 – Williams | 4 – Perkins | Jenny Craig Pavilion (4,772); San Diego, CA |
| Feb 24; 5:00 pm, ESPN2 | No. 6-t | at BYU; Rivalry | W 79–65 | 27–4 (17–1) | 16 – Williams | 6 – 3 Tied | 7 – Perkins | Marriott Center (18,987); Provo, UT |
WCC Tournament
| Mar 3; 7:00 pm, ESPN2 | (1) No. 7 | vs. (8) Loyola Marymount; Quarterfinals | W 83–69 | 28–4 | 24 – Tillie | 10 – Williams | 6 – Perkins | Orleans Arena (7,279); Paradise, NV |
| Mar 5; 6:00 pm, ESPN | (1) No. 6 | vs. (4) San Francisco; Semifinals | W 88–60 | 29–4 | 26 – Tillie | 10 – Williams | 8 – Perkins | Orleans Arena (8,296); Paradise, NV |
| Mar 6; 6:00 pm, ESPN | (1) No. 6 | vs. (3) BYU; Championship/Rivalry | W 74–54 | 30–4 | 22 – Tillie | 13 – Williams | 8 – Perkins | Orleans Arena (8,030); Paradise, NV |
NCAA tournament
| Mar 15*; 10:30 am, TNT | (4 W) No. 8 | vs. (13 W) UNC Greensboro; First Round | W 68–64 | 31–4 | 19 – Williams | 11 – Williams | 2 – Tied | Taco Bell Arena (11,662); Boise, ID |
| Mar 17*; 7:45 pm, CBS | (4 W) No. 8 | vs. (5 W) No. 17 Ohio State; Second Round | W 90–84 | 32–4 | 28 – Norvell Jr. | 12 – Norvell Jr. | 8 – Perkins | Taco Bell Arena (11,686); Boise, ID |
| Mar 22*; 7:07 pm, TBS | (4 W) No. 8 | vs. (9 W) Florida State; Sweet Sixteen | L 60–75 | 32–5 | 16 – Hachimura | 11 – Williams | 4 – Perkins | Staples Center (19,181); Los Angeles, CA |
*Non-conference game. ^{#}Rankings from AP Poll. (#) Tournament seedings in parentheses. W=West. All times are in Pacific Time.

== Rankings ==
Ranking movements Legend: ██ Increase in ranking ██ Decrease in ranking т = Tied with team above or below
| | Week | | | | | | | | | | | | | | | | | | | |
| Poll | Pre | 1 | 2 | 3 | 4 | 5 | 6 | 7 | 8 | 9 | 10 | 11 | 12 | 13 | 14 | 15 | 16 | 17 | 18 | Final |
|---|---|---|---|---|---|---|---|---|---|---|---|---|---|---|---|---|---|---|---|---|
| AP | 18 | 17 | 17 | 15 | 12 | 12 | 12 | 20 | 19 | 15 | 13 | 15 | 14 | 12 | 9 | 6-t | 7 | 6 | 8 | Not released |
| Coaches | 19 | 19^ | 17 | 14 | 13 | 13 | 15 | 19 | 19 | 14 | 14 | 15 | 12 | 11 | 8 | 6 | 7 | 6 | 8 | 10 |

^Coaches did not release a Week 2 poll.
*AP does not release post-NCAA tournament rankings.
