= 2017–18 Pacific Tigers men's basketball team =

American college basketball season

2017–18 Pacific Tigers men's basketball
- Conference: West Coast Conference
- Record: 14–18 (9–9 WCC)
- Head coach: Damon Stoudamire (2nd season)
- Assistant coaches: Leonard Perry; Luke Wicks; JayDee Luster
- Home arena: Alex G. Spanos Center

2017–18 West Coast Conference men's basketball standings
	Conf.				Overall
Team	W		L	PCT	W		L	PCT
No. 8 Gonzaga †	17	–	1	.944	32	–	5	.865
No. 25 Saint Mary's	16	–	2	.889	30	–	6	.833
BYU	11	–	7	.611	24	–	11	.686
San Diego	9	–	9	.500	20	–	14	.588
San Francisco	9	–	9	.500	22	–	17	.564
Pacific	9	–	9	.500	14	–	18	.438
Santa Clara	8	–	10	.444	11	–	20	.355
Loyola Marymount	5	–	13	.278	11	–	20	.355
Portland	4	–	14	.222	10	–	22	.313
Pepperdine	2	–	16	.111	6	–	26	.188
† Conference tournament winner Rankings from AP poll

The 2017–18 Pacific Tigers men's basketball team represented the University of the Pacific during the 2017–18 NCAA Division I men's basketball season. The Tigers were led by second-year head coach Damon Stoudamire and played their home games at the Alex G. Spanos Center in Stockton, California as members of the West Coast Conference. They finished the season 14–18, 9–9 in WCC play to finish in a three-way tie for fourth place. They lost in the first round of the WCC tournament to San Francisco.

== Previous season ==
The Tigers finished the 2016–17 season 11–22, 4–14 in WCC play to finish in ninth place. They defeated Pepperdine in the first round of the WCC tournament to advance to the quarterfinals where they lost to Gonzaga.

== Offseason ==
=== Departures ===
Name	Number	Pos.	Height	Weight	Year	Hometown	Reason for departure
Maleke Haynes	0	G	5'10"	160	Junior	Reseda, CA	Graduate transferred to Alaska Anchorage
T. J. Wallace	2	G	6'3"	215	Senior	Stockton, CA	Graduated
Tonko Vuko	4	F	6'8"	230	Senior	Split, Croatia	Graduated
Keshon Montague	10	G	6'0"	170	Freshman	Brampton, ON	Transferred to Barton CC
D. J. Ursery	15	G	6'4"	195	Junior	Los Angeles, CA	Graduate transferred to Alaska Anchorage
Jason Braden	20	G	6'0"	160	RS Sophomore	Los Angeles, CA	Walk-on; left the team for personal reasons
Jacob Lampkin	21	F	6'9"	235	Junior	Bellevue, WA	Graduate transferred to Alaska Anchorage
Ray Bowles	22	G/F	6'5"	215	RS Junior	Modesto, CA	Graduate transferred to Fresno State
David Taylor	24	F	6'3"	190	Senior	Eckersdorf, Germany	Graduated
TySean Powell	25	F	6'8"	215	Junior	Twinsburg, OH	Transferred to Cumberland
K. J. Smith	30	G	6'2"	160	Freshman	Thousand Oaks, CA	Transferred to North Carolina
Ilias Theodorou	33	F	6'7"	215	Junior	Athens, Greece	Signed to play professionally in Greece with Koroivos B.C.
Sami Eleraky	35	C	7'0"	260	Senior	Aalbrog, Denmark	Graduated

=== Incoming transfers ===
Name	Number	Pos.	Height	Weight	Year	Hometown	Previous School
Jahlil Tripp	0	F	6'5"		Sophomore	Brooklyn, NY	Junior college transferred from South Plains College
Roberto Gallinat	3	G	6'3"		Junior	Atlanta, GA	Junior college transferred from South Plains College
Khy Kabellis	13	G	6'5"	185	Junior	Escondido, CA	Transferred from North Dakota State. Under NCAA transfer rules, Kabellis will have to sit out for the 2017–18 season. Will have two years of remaining eligibility.
Namdi Okonkwo	24	C	7'0"	205	RS Senior	Dallas, TX	Transferred from Portland State. Will be eligible to play immediately since Littles graduated from Portland State.

=== Recruiting Class of 2017 ===
College recruiting information
Name	Hometown	School	Height	Weight	Commit date
Lafayette Dorsey #84 PG	Los Angeles, CA	Dorsey High School	6 ft 1 in (1.85 m)	180 lb (82 kg)	Jun 30, 2017
Lafayette Dorsey #84 PG	Recruit ratings: Scout: Rivals: (59)				
Overall recruit ranking: Scout: 98 Rivals: nr ESPN: nr
Note: In many cases, Scout, Rivals, 247Sports, On3, and ESPN may conflict in their listings of height and weight.; In these cases, the average was taken. ESPN grades are on a 100-point scale.; Sources: "Pacific 2017 Basketball Commitments". Rivals.; "2017 Pacific Basketball Commits". Scout.; "ESPN". ESPN.; "Scout.com Team Recruiting Rankings". Scout.; "2017 Team Ranking". Rivals.

== Roster ==
2017–18 Pacific Tigers men's basketball team
Players
Coaches

Pos.	#	Name	Height	Weight	Year	Previous school	Hometown
F	0	Jahlil Tripp	6 ft 5 in (1.96 m)	190 lb (86 kg)	So	Abraham Lincoln; South Plains College	Brooklyn, NY
G	1	Lafayette Dorsey	6 ft 1 in (1.85 m)	170 lb (77 kg)	Fr	Dorsey	Los Angeles, CA
G	3	Miles Reynolds	6 ft 2 in (1.88 m)	170 lb (77 kg)	RS Jr	Whitney Young; Saint Louis	Chicago, IL
G	4	Roberto Gallinat	6 ft 3 in (1.91 m)	180 lb (82 kg)	Jr	South Gwinnett; South Plains College	Atlanta, GA
F	5	Anthony Townes	6 ft 6 in (1.98 m)	215 lb (98 kg)	Jr	Modesto Christian	Modesto, CA
G	13	Khy Kabellis (redshirt)	6 ft 5 in (1.96 m)	185 lb (84 kg)	Jr	Escondido; North Dakota State	Escondido, CA
G	14	Max Tinsley (W)	6 ft 2 in (1.88 m)	170 lb (77 kg)	Jr	Chaminade Prep	Porter Ranch, CA
G	20	Otto Taylor (W)	6 ft 2 in (1.88 m)	170 lb (77 kg)	Fr	St. Augustine	San Diego, CA
C	24	Namdi Okonkwo	7 ft 0 in (2.13 m)	220 lb (100 kg)	RS Sr	Westwind Prep; Portland State	Dallas, TX
G	25	Kendall Small	6 ft 0 in (1.83 m)	182 lb (83 kg)	RS So	Mayfair; Oregon	Lakewood, CA
F	32	Jack Williams	6 ft 8 in (2.03 m)	220 lb (100 kg)	RS Jr	Chaminade; Long Beach State	Porter Ranch, CA

Head coach

- Damon Stoudamire (Arizona)

Assistant coach(es)

- Leonard Perry (Idaho)
- Luke Wicks (Northern State)
- JayDee Luster (Wyoming)

Legend

- (C) Team captain
- (S) Suspended
- (I) Ineligible
- (W) Walk-on
- Injured
- Current redshirt

Roster

== Schedule and results ==
Date time, TV	Rank^{#}	Opponent^{#}	Result	Record	Site (attendance) city, state
Exhibition
November 8, 2017*; 7:00 pm		Bethesda	W 84–49		Alex G. Spanos Center; Stockton, CA
Non-conference regular season
November 12, 2017*; 7:00 pm, P12N		at Stanford	L 80–89	0–1	Maples Pavilion (3,103); Stanford, CA
November 15, 2017*; 7:00 pm		UC Davis	L 58–62	0–2	Alex G. Spanos Center (2,506); Stockton, CA
November 18, 2017*; 7:00 pm		Nevada	L 66–79	0–3	Alex G. Spanos Center (2,123); Stockton, CA
November 21, 2017*; 6:00 pm		at Air Force; Men Against Breast Cancer Showcase	W 83–71	1–3	Clune Arena (1,510); Colorado Springs, CO
November 24, 2017*; 8:00 pm		Arkansas–Pine Bluff; Men Against Breast Cancer Showcase	W 78–69	2–3	Alex G. Spanos Center (1,349); Stockton, CA
November 25, 2017*; 6:00 pm		Texas State; Men Against Breast Cancer Showcase	L 78–85	2–4	Alex G. Spanos Center (1,325); Stockton, CA
November 26, 2017*; 6:00 pm		Canisius; Men Against Breast Cancer Showcase	W 80–58	3–4	Alex G. Spanos Center (1,150); Stockton, CA
November 30, 2017*; 7:00 pm		at UC Riverside	W 57–55	4–4	SRC Arena (372); Riverside, CA
December 3, 2017*; 3:00 pm		Arkansas–Fort Smith	W 105–68	5–4	Alex G. Spanos Center (1,238); Stockton, CA
December 6, 2017*; 7:30 pm		at UC Davis	L 67–71	5–5	The Pavilion (2,177); Davis, CA
December 9, 2017*; 3:00 pm		at Wyoming	L 72–86	5–6	Arena-Auditorium (4,606); Laramie, WY
December 16, 2017*; 7:00 pm		UNLV	L 76–81	5–7	Alex G. Spanos Center (2,279); Stockton, CA
December 22, 2017*; 12:00 pm, P12N		at No. 3 Arizona State	L 65–104	5–8	Wells Fargo Arena (10,646); Tempe, AZ
WCC regular season
December 28, 2017; 6:00 pm, ESPN2		at No. 20 Gonzaga	L 48–81	5–9 (0–1)	McCarthey Athletic Center (6,000); Spokane, WA
December 30, 2017; 7:00 pm		Loyola Marymount	W 88–82	6–9 (1–1)	Alex G. Spanos Center (1,400); Stockton, CA
January 4, 2018; 7:00 pm		at Saint Mary's	L 56–74	6–10 (1–2)	McKeon Pavilion (2,752); Moraga, CA
January 6, 2018; 7:00 pm, BYUtv		BYU	W 67–66	7–10 (2–2)	Alex G. Spanos Center (2,897); Stockton, CA
January 11, 2018; 7:00 pm		San Diego	W 74–70	8–10 (3–2)	Alex G. Spanos Center (1,369); Stockton, CA
January 13, 2018; 7:00 pm, NBCSBA+		at Portland	W 66–54	9–10 (4–2)	Chiles Center (1,945); Portland, OR
January 18, 2018; 7:00 pm		Pepperdine	W 92–78	10–10 (5–2)	Alex G. Spanos Center (1,749); Stockton, CA
January 20, 2018; 7:00 pm		Saint Mary's	L 69–72	10–11 (5–3)	Alex G. Spanos Center (3,306); Stockton, CA
January 25, 2018; 7:00 pm		at San Francisco	L 67–69	10–12 (5–4)	War Memorial Gymnasium (1,808); San Francisco, CA
January 27, 2018; 6:00 pm, BYUtv		at BYU	L 65–80	10–13 (5–5)	Marriott Center (16,456); Provo, UT
February 1, 2018; 8:00 pm, NBCSBA		at Santa Clara	W 63–45	11–13 (6–5)	Leavey Center (1,588); Santa Clara, CA
February 3, 2018; 7:00 pm		at Pepperdine	W 81–72	12–13 (7–5)	Firestone Fieldhouse (723); Malibu, CA
February 8, 2018; 7:00 pm, NBCSBA+		No. 12 Gonzaga	L 61–71	12–14 (7–6)	Alex G. Spanos Center (3,453); Stockton, CA
February 10, 2018; 7:00 pm		Portland	W 60–58	13–14 (8–6)	Alex G. Spanos Center; Stockton, CA
February 15, 2018; 7:00 pm		at San Diego	W 67–55	14–14 (9–6)	Jenny Craig Pavilion (1,391); San Diego, CA
February 17, 2018; 8:00 pm, NBCSCA		Santa Clara	L 68–72	14–15 (9–7)	Alex G. Spanos Center (2,306); Stockton, CA
February 22, 2018; 7:00 pm		San Francisco	L 74–84	14–16 (9–8)	Alex G. Spanos Center (1,661); Stockton, CA
February 24, 2018; 1:00 pm, NBCSCA		at Loyola Marymount	L 71–74	14–17 (9–9)	Gersten Pavilion (872); Los Angeles, CA
WCC tournament
March 2, 2018; 3:00 pm, NBCSCA	(5)	vs. (4) San Francisco; Quarterfinals	L 70–71 ^{OT}	14–18	Orleans Arena (7,142); Las Vegas
*Non-conference game. ^{#}Rankings from AP Poll. (#) Tournament seedings in parentheses. All times are in Pacific Time.
