= 2018 West Coast Conference men's basketball tournament =

- Classification: Division I
- Season: 2017–18
- Teams: 10
- Site: Orleans Arena; Paradise, Nevada
- Champions: Gonzaga (17th title)
- Winning coach: Mark Few (15th title)
- MVP: Killian Tillie (Gonzaga)

2017–18 West Coast Conference men's basketball standings
	Conf.				Overall
Team	W		L	PCT	W		L	PCT
No. 8 Gonzaga †	17	–	1	.944	32	–	5	.865
No. 25 Saint Mary's	16	–	2	.889	30	–	6	.833
BYU	11	–	7	.611	24	–	11	.686
San Diego	9	–	9	.500	20	–	14	.588
San Francisco	9	–	9	.500	22	–	17	.564
Pacific	9	–	9	.500	14	–	18	.438
Santa Clara	8	–	10	.444	11	–	20	.355
Loyola Marymount	5	–	13	.278	11	–	20	.355
Portland	4	–	14	.222	10	–	22	.313
Pepperdine	2	–	16	.111	6	–	26	.188
† Conference tournament winner Rankings from AP poll

The 2018 West Coast Conference men's basketball tournament was the postseason men's basketball tournament for the West Coast Conference for the 2017–18 season. All tournament games were played at the Orleans Arena in Paradise, Nevada, from March 2–6, 2018. Regular-season champion Gonzaga won the tournament and with it the conference's automatic bid to the NCAA tournament.

== Seeds ==
All ten teams in the West Coast Conference were eligible to compete in the conference tournament. The top six teams received a first-round bye. Teams were seeded by record within the conference, with a tiebreaker system to seed teams with identical conference records.

Seed	School	Conference	Tiebreaker 1	Tiebreaker 2
1	Gonzaga	17–1		
2	Saint Mary's	16–2		
3	BYU	11–7		
4	San Francisco	9–9	1–1 vs. SMC	
5	Pacific	9–9	0–2 vs. SMC	2–0 vs. San Diego
6	San Diego	9–9	0–2 vs. SMC	0–2 vs. Pacific
7	Santa Clara	8–10		
8	Loyola Marymount	5–13		
9	Portland	4–14		
10	Pepperdine	2–16		

== Schedule and results ==
Game	Time	Matchup	Score	Television
First round – Friday, March 2
1	6:00 pm	No. 8 Loyola Marymount vs No. 9 Portland	78–72	SPEC SN/NBCS CA/ROOT NW/ATT RM/TheW.tv
2	8:00 pm	No. 7 Santa Clara vs No. 10 Pepperdine	69–85	SPEC SN/NBCS CA/ROOT NW/ATT RM/TheW.tv
Quarterfinals – Saturday, March 3
3	1:00 pm	No. 3 BYU vs No. 6 San Diego	85–79	SPEC SN/NBCS CA/ROOT NW/ATT RM/TheW.tv
4	3:00 pm	No. 4 San Francisco vs No. 5 Pacific	71–70^{OT}	SPEC SN/NBCS CA/ROOT NW/ATT RM/TheW.tv
5	7:00 pm	No. 1 Gonzaga vs No. 8 Loyola Marymount	83–69	ESPN2
6	9:00 pm	No. 2 Saint Mary's vs No. 10 Pepperdine	69–66	ESPN2
Semifinals – Monday, March 5
7	6:00 pm	No. 1 Gonzaga vs. No. 4 San Francisco	88–60	ESPN
8	8:30 pm	No. 2 Saint Mary's vs No. 3 BYU	72–85	ESPN2
Final – Tuesday, March 6
9	6:00 pm	No. 1 Gonzaga vs No. 3 BYU	74–54	ESPN
*Game times in PST. Rankings denote tournament seed

== Bracket ==
First round Friday, March 2
8	Loyola Marymount	78
9	Portland	72
7	Santa Clara	69
10	Pepperdine	85

Quarterfinals; Saturday, March 3 ESPN2
1	Gonzaga	83
8	Loyola Marymount	69
4	San Francisco	71*
5	Pacific	70
2	Saint Mary's	69
10	Pepperdine	66
3	BYU	85
6	San Diego	79

Semifinals; Monday, March 5 ESPN/ESPN2
1	Gonzaga	88
4	San Francisco	60
2	Saint Mary's	72
3	BYU	85

Championship; Tuesday, March 6 ESPN
1	Gonzaga	74
3	BYU	54

* indicates overtime period.

== See also ==
- West Coast Conference men's basketball tournament
- 2018 West Coast Conference women's basketball tournament
