= 2017–18 Pepperdine Waves men's basketball team =

American college basketball season

2017–18 Pepperdine Waves men's basketball
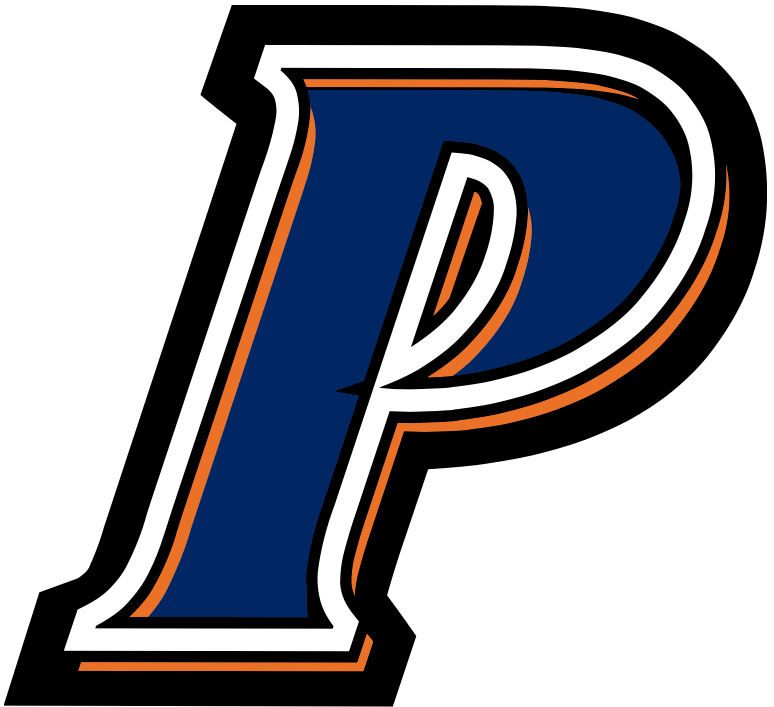
- Conference: West Coast Conference
- Record: 6–26 (2–16 WCC)
- Head coach: Marty Wilson (7th season)
- Assistant coaches: Mark Amaral; Bryant Moore; John Impelman
- Home arena: Firestone Fieldhouse

2017–18 West Coast Conference men's basketball standings
	Conf.				Overall
Team	W		L	PCT	W		L	PCT
No. 8 Gonzaga †	17	–	1	.944	32	–	5	.865
No. 25 Saint Mary's	16	–	2	.889	30	–	6	.833
BYU	11	–	7	.611	24	–	11	.686
San Diego	9	–	9	.500	20	–	14	.588
San Francisco	9	–	9	.500	22	–	17	.564
Pacific	9	–	9	.500	14	–	18	.438
Santa Clara	8	–	10	.444	11	–	20	.355
Loyola Marymount	5	–	13	.278	11	–	20	.355
Portland	4	–	14	.222	10	–	22	.313
Pepperdine	2	–	16	.111	6	–	26	.188
† Conference tournament winner Rankings from AP poll

The 2017–18 Pepperdine Waves men's basketball team represented Pepperdine University during the 2017–18 NCAA Division I men's basketball season. The Waves were led by seventh-year head coach Marty Wilson and played their home games at the Firestone Fieldhouse in Malibu, California as members of the West Coast Conference. They finished the season 6–26, 2–16 in WCC play to finish in last place. They defeated Santa Clara in the first round of the WCC tournament before losing in the quarterfinals to Saint Mary's.

On February 13, 2018, the school announced that head coach Marty Wilson would not return as head coach following the end of the season. He finished at Pepperdine with a seven-year record of 88–129 (91–139 when including his 3–10 record as interim head coach in 1995–96). On March 12, the school hired Lorenzo Romar as head coach. Romar returned to Pepperdine where he started his coaching career in 1996.

== Previous season ==
The Waves finished the 2016–17 season 9–22, 5–13 in WCC play to finish in eighth place. They lost in the first round of the WCC tournament to Pacific.

== Offseason ==
=== Departures ===
Name	Number	Pos.	Height	Weight	Year	Hometown	Reason for departure
Jeremy Major	3	G	5'10"	175	Senior	Pasadena, CA	Graduated
Nate Gehring	12	C	6'10"	225	RS Sophomore	Waukee, IA	Transferred
Chris Reyes	14	F	6'7"	235	Senior	La Verne, CA	Graduated
Jonathan Allen	23	G	6'2"	200	Senior	Nashville, TN	Walk-on; graduated
Craig LeCesne	24	F	6'9"	225	Freshman	Oxie, Sweden	Transferred to San Bernardino Valley College
Lamond Murray Jr.	30	G/F	6'5"	200	Senior	Torrance, CA	Graduated
Ryan Keenan	44	C	6'10"	240	RS Sophomore	Woodbury, MN	Transferred

=== Incoming transfers ===
Name	Number	Pos.	Height	Weight	Year	Hometown	Previous school
Darnell Dunn	12	F	6'5"	225	Junior	Kinston, NC	Junior college transferred from Miami Dade College.
Harrison Meads	22	F	6'7"		Junior	New Plymouth, New Zealand	Junior college transferred from Laramie County CC.
Matthew Atewe	41	F	6'9"	250	RS Senior	Toronto, ON	Transferred from Washington. Will be eligible to play immediately since Atewe graduated from Washington.

=== Recruiting class of 2017 ===
College recruiting
Name	Hometown	School	Height	Weight	Commit date
Jade' Smith #60 PG	Oakland, CA	St. Joseph Notre Dame High School	6 ft 2 in (1.88 m)	172 lb (78 kg)	Sep 19, 2016
Jade' Smith #60 PG	Recruit ratings: Scout: Rivals: (75)				
Colbey Ross #76 PG	Aurora, CO	Eaglecrest High School	6 ft 0 in (1.83 m)	160 lb (73 kg)	Sep 5, 2016
Colbey Ross #76 PG	Recruit ratings: Scout: Rivals: (69)				
Trae Berhow; SG	Watertown, MN	Watertown-Mayer High School	6 ft 5 in (1.96 m)	200 lb (91 kg)	
Trae Berhow; SG	Recruit ratings: Scout: Rivals: (NR)				
Overall recruit ranking: Scout: nr Rivals: nr ESPN: nr
Note: In many cases, Scout, Rivals, 247Sports, On3, and ESPN may conflict in their listings of height and weight.; In these cases, the average was taken. ESPN grades are on a 100-point scale.; Sources: "Pepperdine Waves 2017 Basketball Commitments". Rivals.; "2017 Pepperdine Waves Basketball Commits". Scout.; "ESPN 2017 Pepperdine Waves Basketball recruits". ESPN.; "Scout.com Team Recruiting Rankings". Scout.; "2017 Team Ranking". Rivals.

== Roster ==
2017–18 Pepperdine Waves men's basketball team
Players
Coaches

Pos.	#	Name	Height	Weight	Year	Previous school	Hometown
G	0	Amadi Udenyi	6 ft 0 in (1.83 m)	195 lb (88 kg)	RS Sr	De La Salle HS; St. Thomas More	Oakland, CA
G	1	Elijah Lee	5 ft 10 in (1.78 m)	160 lb (73 kg)	So	Homeschool Christian Youth Ass.	Houston, TX
G	2	Eric Cooper, Jr.	6 ft 3 in (1.91 m)	190 lb (86 kg)	RS Jr	IMG Academy; Nevada	Ontario, CA
G	3	Michael Wexler (W)	5 ft 11 in (1.8 m)	175 lb (79 kg)	Fr	Benilde-St. Margaret's School	Plymouth, MN
G	4	Colbey Ross	6 ft 1 in (1.85 m)	180 lb (82 kg)	Fr	Eaglecrest HS	Aurora, CO
G	5	Jade' Smith	6 ft 4 in (1.93 m)	175 lb (79 kg)	Fr	St. Joseph Notre Dame HS	Oakland, CA
G	11	Trae Berhow	6 ft 5 in (1.96 m)	195 lb (88 kg)	Fr	Watertown Mayer HS	Watertown, MN
F	12	Darnell Dunn	6 ft 6 in (1.98 m)	205 lb (93 kg)	Jr	Kinston HS; Miami Dade JC	Kinston, NC
G	15	Caleb Martin (W)	6 ft 2 in (1.88 m)	190 lb (86 kg)	So	Buckley School	Los Angeles, CA
F	20	Kameron Edwards	6 ft 6 in (1.98 m)	230 lb (104 kg)	RS So	Etiwanda HS	Rancho Cucamonga, CA
G	21	Knox Hellums	6 ft 5 in (1.96 m)	195 lb (88 kg)	So	Concordia Lutheran HS	Tomball, TX
F	22	Harrison Meads	6 ft 7 in (2.01 m)	215 lb (98 kg)	Jr	New Plymouth Boys HS; Laramie County CC	New Plymouth, New Zealand
F	31	Nolan Taylor	6 ft 7 in (2.01 m)	260 lb (118 kg)	So	Keller HS	Keller, TX
G	32	Kaijae Yee-Stephens	6 ft 1 in (1.85 m)	190 lb (86 kg)	RS Fr	Santa Cruz HS	Santa Cruz, CA
C	33	Erik Mailliard (W)	6 ft 10 in (2.08 m)	210 lb (95 kg)	Fr	Parish Episcopal School	Dallas, TX
F	34	Kevin Hempy (W)	6 ft 6 in (1.98 m)	200 lb (91 kg)	RS Sr	San Marcos HS; Westmont College	Santa Barbara, CA
F/C	41	Matthew Atewe	6 ft 9 in (2.06 m)	250 lb (113 kg)	RS Sr	Notre Dame Prep; Washington	Toronto, ON

Head coach

- Marty Wilson (Pepperdine)

Assistant coach(es)

- Marak Amaral (College of Idaho)
- Bryant Moore (Texas Tech)
- John Impelman (Occidental)

Legend

- (C) Team captain
- (S) Suspended
- (I) Ineligible
- (W) Walk-on
- Injured
- Current redshirt

Roster

== Schedule and results ==
Date time, TV	Rank^{#}	Opponent^{#}	Result	Record	Site (attendance) city, state
Non conference regular season
Nov 10, 2017*; 5:30 pm, FCS		at Oklahoma State; Legends Classic Regional Round	L 47–78	0–1	Gallagher-Iba Arena (5,386); Stillwater, OK
Nov 14, 2017*; 7:00 pm		Cal Lutheran	W 107–82	1–1	Firestone Fieldhouse (1,375); Malibu, CA
Nov 17, 2017*; 7:00 pm		Northern Colorado	L 82–84	1–2	Firestone Fieldhouse (805); Malibu, CA
Nov 20, 2017*; 7:30 pm		UC Santa Barbara; Legends Classic Subregional semifinals	L 84–92	1–3	Firestone Fieldhouse (1,682); Malibu, CA
Nov 21, 2017*; 7:30 pm		Oral Roberts; Legends Classic Subregional 3rd place game	W 80–76	2–3	Firestone Fieldhouse (1,239); Malibu, CA
Nov 24, 2017*; 5:00 pm, SECN		at No. 16 Texas A&M; Legends Classic Regional Round	L 65–81	2–4	Reed Arena (6,704); College Station, TX
Nov 29, 2017*; 7:00 pm		Southern Utah	L 82–88	2–5	Firestone Fieldhouse (912); Malibu, CA
Dec 2, 2017*; 7:00 pm		at Cal Poly	L 81–91	2–6	Robert A. Mott Athletics Center (1,384); San Luis Obispo, CA
Dec 5, 2017*; 7:00 pm		UC Riverside	W 70–59	3–6	Firestone Fieldhouse (942); Malibu, CA
Dec 9, 2017*; 7:00 pm		Long Beach State	L 71–78	3–7	Firestone Fieldhouse (976); Malibu, CA
Dec 16, 2017*; 12:00 pm		at Belmont	L 62–79	3–8	Curb Event Center (1,427); Nashville, TN
Dec 19, 2017*; 6:00 pm		at Weber State	L 67–72	3–9	Dee Events Center (6,576); Ogden, UT
WCC regular season
Dec 28, 2017; 7:00 pm		at Santa Clara	L 65–72	3–10 (0–1)	Leavey Center (1,192); Santa Clara, CA
Dec 30, 2017; 1:00 pm, SPCSN		at San Diego	L 66–74	3–11 (0–2)	Jenny Craig Pavilion (1,521); San Diego, CA
Jan 4, 2018; 8:00 pm, ESPNU		No. 19 Gonzaga	L 59–89	3–12 (0–3)	Firestone Fieldhouse (2,930); Mailbu, CA
Jan 6, 2018; 1:00 pm, SPCSN		at San Francisco	L 67–80	3–13 (0–4)	Firestone Fieldhouse (795); Mailbu, CA
Jan 11, 2018; 6:00 pm, BYUtv		at BYU	L 63–83	3–14 (0–5)	Marriott Center (13,223); Provo, UT
Jan 13, 2018; 5:00 pm, SPCSN		at Saint Mary's	L 67–91	3–15 (0–6)	Firestone Fieldhouse (1,574); Malibu, CA
Jan 18, 2018; 7:00 pm		at Pacific	L 78–92	3–16 (0–7)	Alex G. Spanos Center (1,749); Stockton, CA
Jan 20, 2018; 7:00 pm		at San Francisco	L 73–80	3–17 (0–8)	War Memorial Gymnasium (2,116); San Francisco, CA
Jan 25, 2018; 7:00 pm, SPCSN		Loyola Marymount	W 71–70	4–17 (1–8)	Firestone Fieldhouse (811); Malibu, CA
Jan 27, 2018; 3:00 pm, SPCSN		at Santa Clara	L 59–73	4–18 (1–9)	Firestone Fieldhouse (742); Malibu, CA
Feb 1, 2018; 7:00 pm		at Portland	L 76–85 ^{OT}	4–19 (1–10)	Chiles Center (1,772); Portland, OR
Feb 3, 2018; 7:00 pm		at Pacific	L 72–81	4–20 (1–11)	Firestone Fieldhouse (723); Malibu, CA
Feb 8, 2018; 7:30 pm, SPCSN		at San Diego	L 66–68	4–21 (1–12)	Firestone Fieldhouse (763); Malibu, CA
Feb 10, 2018; 3:00 pm		at Loyola Marymount	L 79–85	4–22 (1–13)	Gersten Pavilion (3,150); Los Angeles, CA
Feb 15, 2018; 7:00 pm, BYUtv		BYU	L 70–75 ^{OT}	4–23 (1–14)	Firestone Fieldhouse (1,504); Mailbu, CA
Feb 17, 2018; 5:00 pm, SPCSN		at No. 9 Gonzaga	L 67–81	4–24 (1–15)	McCarthey Athletic Center (6,000); Spokane, WA
Feb 22, 2018; 5:00 pm		at No. 22 Saint Mary's	L 61–75	4–25 (1–16)	McKeon Pavilion (3,167); Moraga, CA
Feb 24, 2018; 5:00 pm		Portland	W 75–64	5–25 (2–16)	Firestone Fieldhouse (725); Malibu, CA
WCC tournament
Mar 2, 2018; 8:00 pm, SPCSN	(10)	vs. (7) Santa Clara; First round	W 85–69	6–25	Orleans Arena (6,747); Paradise, NV
Mar 3, 2018; 9:00 pm, ESPN2	(10)	vs. (2) Saint Mary's; Quarterfinals	L 66–69	6–26	Orleans Arena (7,279); Paradise, NV
*Non-conference game. ^{#}Rankings from AP Poll. (#) Tournament seedings in parentheses. All times are in Pacific Time.
