= 2017–18 Santa Clara Broncos men's basketball team =

American college basketball season

2017–18 Santa Clara Broncos men's basketball
- Conference: West Coast Conference
- Record: 11–20 (8–10 WCC)
- Head coach: Herb Sendek (2nd season)
- Assistant coaches: Julius Hodge; Jason Ludwig; Justin Gainey
- Home arena: Leavey Center

2017–18 West Coast Conference men's basketball standings
	Conf.				Overall
Team	W		L	PCT	W		L	PCT
No. 8 Gonzaga †	17	–	1	.944	32	–	5	.865
No. 25 Saint Mary's	16	–	2	.889	30	–	6	.833
BYU	11	–	7	.611	24	–	11	.686
San Diego	9	–	9	.500	20	–	14	.588
San Francisco	9	–	9	.500	22	–	17	.564
Pacific	9	–	9	.500	14	–	18	.438
Santa Clara	8	–	10	.444	11	–	20	.355
Loyola Marymount	5	–	13	.278	11	–	20	.355
Portland	4	–	14	.222	10	–	22	.313
Pepperdine	2	–	16	.111	6	–	26	.188
† Conference tournament winner Rankings from AP poll

The 2017–18 Santa Clara Broncos men's basketball team represented Santa Clara University during the 2017–18 NCAA Division I men's basketball season. The Broncos were led by second-year head coach Herb Sendek and played their home games at the Leavey Center as members of the West Coast Conference. They finished the season 11–20, 8–10 in WCC play to finish in seventh place. They lost in the first round of the WCC tournament to Pepperdine.

== Previous season ==
The Broncos finished the 2016–17 season 17–16, 10–8 in WCC play to finish in a tie for fourth place. They defeated San Francisco in the WCC tournament before losing in the semifinals to Gonzaga.

== Departures ==
Name	Number	Pos.	Height	Weight	Year	Hometown	Reason for departure
Evan Wardlow	1	G	6'4"	185	Junior	Lake View Terrace, CA	Graduate transferred
Akil Douglas	13	F	6'10"	190	Junior	San Jose, CA	Graduate transferred to Clark Atlanta
Evan Crawford	14	G	6'3"	200	Sophomore	Altadena, CA	Walk-on; didn't return
Matt Hubbard	22	F	6'9"	230	Junior	Colville, CA	Graduate transferred to California Baptist
Jared Brownridge	23	G	6'3"	200	Senior	Aurora, IL	Graduated
Tony Lewis	35	F	6'8"	260	RS Freshman	San Antonio, TX	Transferred to Blinn College
Nate Kratch	43	F	6'6"	227	RS Senior	Wartertown, MN	Graduated

=== Incoming transfers ===
Name	Number	Pos.	Height	Weight	Year	Hometown	Previous School
Tahj Eaddy	2	G	6'2"	154	Sophomore	West Haven, CT	Transferred from Southeast Missouri State. Under NCAA transfer rules, Eaddy will have to sit out for the 2017–18 season. Will have three years of remaining eligibility.
Henry Caruso	21	F	6'4"	200	Senior	San Mateo, CA	Transferred from Princeton. Will be eligible to play immediately since Caruso graduated from Princeton.

== Recruiting ==
College recruiting information
Name	Hometown	School	Height	Weight	Commit date
Matt Turner #61 SG	Trumbull, CT	Blair Academy	6 ft 3 in (1.91 m)	170 lb (77 kg)	Oct 12, 2016
Matt Turner #61 SG	Recruit ratings: Scout: Rivals: (76)				
Shaquille Walters #62 SG	London, England	Blair Academy	6 ft 6 in (1.98 m)	190 lb (86 kg)	Nov 2, 2016
Shaquille Walters #62 SG	Recruit ratings: Scout: Rivals: (76)				
Josip Vrankic #85 PF	Etobicoke, ON	Wasatch Academy	6 ft 8 in (2.03 m)	205 lb (93 kg)	Oct 4, 2016
Josip Vrankic #85 PF	Recruit ratings: Scout: Rivals: (67)				
Overall recruit ranking: Scout: nr Rivals: nr ESPN: nr
Note: In many cases, Scout, Rivals, 247Sports, On3, and ESPN may conflict in their listings of height and weight.; In these cases, the average was taken. ESPN grades are on a 100-point scale.; Sources: "Santa Clara 2017 Basketball Commitments". Rivals.; "2017 Santa Clara Basketball Commits". Scout.; "ESPN". ESPN.; "Scout.com Team Recruiting Rankings". Scout.; "2017 Team Ranking". Rivals.

== Roster ==
2017–18 Santa Clara Broncos men's basketball team
Players
Coaches

Pos.	#	Name	Height	Weight	Year	Previous school	Hometown
C	0	Julian Roche	6 ft 11 in (2.11 m)	235 lb (107 kg)	RS Fr	Proctor Academy	Saint John, NB
G	1	Matt Turner	6 ft 3 in (1.91 m)	175 lb (79 kg)	Fr	Blair Academy	Trumbull, CT
G	2	Tahj Eaddy (redshirt)	6 ft 1 in (1.85 m)	165 lb (75 kg)	So	Tennessee Prep; Southeast Missouri State	West Haven, CT
F	3	Henrik Jädersten	6 ft 11 in (2.11 m)	240 lb (109 kg)	Jr	Solna Gymnasium	Stockholm, Sweden
G	4	Jarvis Pugh	6 ft 6 in (1.98 m)	210 lb (95 kg)	RS Sr	Plano East	Murphy, TX
G	10	K. J. Feagin	6 ft 1 in (1.85 m)	190 lb (86 kg)	Jr	Long Beach Poly	Long Beach, CA
G	12	Matt Hauser	6 ft 1 in (1.85 m)	180 lb (82 kg)	Jr	Thousand Oaks	Thousand Oaks, CA
F	13	Josip Vrankic	6 ft 8 in (2.03 m)	205 lb (93 kg)	Fr	Wasatch Academy	Toronto, ON
G	15	Johnny Swayer (W)	6 ft 2 in (1.88 m)	190 lb (86 kg)	So	DeMartha	Hyattsville, MD
G/F	21	Henry Caruso	6 ft 4 in (1.93 m)	195 lb (88 kg)	Sr	Junípero Serra; Princeton	San Mateo, CA
G/F	22	Shaquille Walters	6 ft 6 in (1.98 m)	190 lb (86 kg)	Fr	City of London Academy/Lee Academy	London, England
G	25	Kai Healy	6 ft 5 in (1.96 m)	210 lb (95 kg)	Sr	The Scots College in Bellevue Hills	Wahroonga, Sydney, Australia
G	33	Matt Jasaitis (W)	5 ft 11 in (1.8 m)	170 lb (77 kg)	RS Jr	Loyola; Grinnell College	Manhattan Beach, CA
C	50	Emmanuel Ndumanya	6 ft 9 in (2.06 m)	267 lb (121 kg)	RS Sr	Junípero Serra	Anambra, Nigeria

Head coach

- Herb Sendek (Carnegie Mellon)

Assistant coach(es)

- Julius Hodge (NC State)
- Jason Ludwig (UCLA)
- Justin Gainey (NC State)

Legend

- (C) Team captain
- (S) Suspended
- (I) Ineligible
- (W) Walk-on
- Injured
- Current redshirt

Roster

== Schedule and results ==
Date time, TV	Rank^{#}	Opponent^{#}	Result	Record	Site (attendance) city, state
Exhibition
Nov 3, 2017*; 7:00 pm		Saint Vincent	W 103–61		Leavey Center (1,113); Santa Clara, CA
Non-conference regular season
Nov 10, 2017*; 7:00 pm		La Verne	W 120–70	1–0	Leavey Center (1,558); Santa Clara, CA
Nov 15, 2017*; 7:00 pm		Nevada	L 63–93	1–1	Leavey Center (1,892); Santa Clara, CA
Nov 18, 2017*; 7:00 pm		Cal Poly	L 59–63	1–2	Leavey Center (1,626); Santa Clara, CA
Nov 22, 2017*; 6:30 pm		vs. Idaho; Great Alaska Shootout first round	L 59–69	1–3	Alaska Airlines Center (2,303); Anchorage, AK
Nov 23, 2017*; 9:00 pm		at Alaska Anchorage; Great Alaska Shootout consolation round	L 73–78 ^{OT}	1–4	Alaska Airlines Center (1,880); Anchorage, AK
Nov 25, 2017*; 1:00 pm		vs. Sam Houston State; Great Alaska Shootout 7th place game	L 59–73	1–5	Alaska Airlines Center (1,823); Anchorage, AK
Nov 30, 2017*; 7:00 pm		Northern Arizona	W 89–57	2–5	Leavey Center (1,263); Santa Clara, CA
Dec 2, 2017*; 7:00 pm		Arkansas–Pine Bluff	W 72–57	3–5	Leavey Center (1,273); Santa Clara, CA
Dec 9, 2017*; 7:00 pm		Portland State	L 84–87	3–6	Leavey Center (1,361); Santa Clara, CA
Dec 14, 2017*; 7:00 pm, P12N		at USC	L 59–82	3–7	Galen Center (2,712); Los Angeles, CA
Dec 18, 2017*; 7:00 pm		Valparaiso	L 68–76	3–8	Leavey Center (1,305); Santa Clara, CA
Dec 21, 2017*; 7:00 pm		San Jose State; Cable Car Classic	L 63–75	3–9	Leavey Center (2,406); Santa Clara, CA
WCC regular season
Dec 28, 2017; 7:00 pm		Pepperdine	W 72–65	4–9 (1–0)	Leavey Center (1,192); Santa Clara, CA
Dec 30, 2017; 4:00 pm, NBCSCA		at No. 20 Gonzaga	L 52–101	4–10 (1–1)	McCarthey Athletic Center (6,000); Spokane, WA
Jan 4, 2018; 7:00 pm, NBCSCA+		at Loyola Marymount	W 65–49	5–10 (2–1)	Gersten Pavilion (773); Los Angeles, CA
Jan 6, 2018; 7:00 pm		Portland	W 70–68	6–10 (3–1)	Leavey Center (1,688); Santa Clara, CA
Jan 11, 2018; 8:00 pm, ESPNU		Saint Mary's	L 57–81	6–11 (3–2)	Leavey Center (2,871); Santa Clara, CA
Jan 13, 2018; 7:00 pm, BYUtv		BYU	L 50–84	6–12 (3–3)	Leavey Center (3,369); Santa Clara, CA
Jan 18, 2018; 7:00 pm, NBCSBA		at San Francisco	W 65–62	7–12 (4–3)	War Memorial Gymnasium (1,508); San Francisco, CA
Jan 20, 2017; 5:00 pm, NBCSCA+		No. 13 Gonzaga	L 60–75	7–13 (4–4)	Leavey Center (5,011); Santa Clara, CA
Jan 25, 2018; 7:00 pm		at San Diego	L 58–66	7–14 (4–5)	Jenny Craig Pavilion (1,231); San Diego, CA
Jan 27, 2018; 3:00 pm		at Pepperdine	W 73–59	8–14 (5–5)	Firestone Fieldhouse (742); Malibu, CA
Feb 1, 2018; 7:00 pm, NBCSBA		Pacific	L 45–63	8–15 (5–6)	Leavey Center (1,588); Santa Clara, CA
Feb 3, 2018; 8:00 pm, NBCSCA		San Francisco	L 59–70	8–16 (5–7)	Leavey Center (2,876); Santa Clara, CA
Feb 8, 2018; 8:00 pm, ESPNU		at BYU	L 58–80	8–17 (5–8)	Marriott Center (11,638); Provo, UT
Feb 10, 2018; 1:00 pm		San Diego	W 70–64	9–17 (6–8)	Leavey Center (2,046); Santa Clara, CA
Feb 15, 2018; 7:00 pm		at Portland	W 81–72	10–17 (7–8)	Chiles Center (2,031); Portland, OR
Feb 17, 2018; 8:00 pm, NBCSCA		at Pacific	W 72–68	11–17 (8–8)	Alex G. Spanos Center (2,306); Stockton, CA
Feb 22, 2018; 7:00 pm		Loyola Marymount	L 64–65	11–18 (8–9)	Leavey Center (2,408); Santa Clara, CA
Feb 24, 2018; 3:00 pm, NBCSCA		at No. 22 Saint Mary's	L 40–67	11–19 (8–10)	McKeon Pavilion (3,500); Moraga, CA
WCC tournament
Mar 2, 2018; 8:00 pm, NBCSCA	(7)	vs. (10) Pepperdine; First round	L 69–85	11–20	Orleans Arena (6,747); Paradise, NV
*Non-conference game. ^{#}Rankings from AP Poll. (#) Tournament seedings in parentheses. All times are in Pacific Time.
