= 2017–18 Portland Pilots men's basketball team =

American college basketball season

2017–18 Portland Pilots men's basketball
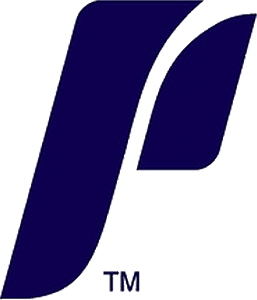
- Conference: West Coast Conference
- Record: 10–22 (4–14 WCC)
- Head coach: Terry Porter (2nd season)
- Assistant coaches: Bob Cantu; Ben Johnson; Kramer Knutson
- Home arena: Chiles Center

2017–18 West Coast Conference men's basketball standings
	Conf.				Overall
Team	W		L	PCT	W		L	PCT
No. 8 Gonzaga †	17	–	1	.944	32	–	5	.865
No. 25 Saint Mary's	16	–	2	.889	30	–	6	.833
BYU	11	–	7	.611	24	–	11	.686
San Diego	9	–	9	.500	20	–	14	.588
San Francisco	9	–	9	.500	22	–	17	.564
Pacific	9	–	9	.500	14	–	18	.438
Santa Clara	8	–	10	.444	11	–	20	.355
Loyola Marymount	5	–	13	.278	11	–	20	.355
Portland	4	–	14	.222	10	–	22	.313
Pepperdine	2	–	16	.111	6	–	26	.188
† Conference tournament winner Rankings from AP poll

The 2017–18 Portland Pilots men's basketball team represented the University of Portland during the 2017–18 NCAA Division I men's basketball season. The Pilots, led by second-year head coach Terry Porter, played their home games at the Chiles Center as members of the West Coast Conference. They finished the season 10–22, 4–14 in WCC play to finish in ninth place. They lost in the first round of the WCC tournament to Loyola Marymount.

== Previous season ==
The Pilots finished the 2016–17 season 11–22, 2–16 in WCC play to finish in last place. They defeated San Diego in the first round of the WCC tournament to advance to the quarterfinals where they lost to Saint Mary's.

== Offseason ==
=== Departures ===
Name	Number	Pos.	Height	Weight	Year	Hometown	Reason for departure
Xavier Hallinan	0	G	6'0"	165	Sophomore	Portland, OR	Walk-on; graduate transferred to Cal State Dominguez Hills
Alec Wintering	2	G	6'0"	165	Senior	Concord, NC	Graduated
Chief Maker	4	G/F	6'7"	200	RS Freshman	Sydney, Australia	Transferred to Palm Beach State College
Andre Ferguson	11	G	6'0"	180	Freshman	Los Angeles, CA	Transferred to Howard College
Alec Monson	20	G	6'5"	175	Freshman	Salt Lake City, UT	Transferred to Salt Lake CC
Jazz Johnson	22	G	5'10"	200	Sophomore	Lake Oswego, OR	Transferred to Nevada
Gabe Taylor	24	F	6'8"	230	Junior	Portland, OR	Graduate transferred to California Baptist
Ray Barreno	32	C	6'10"	250	Senior	Chihuahua, Mexico	Graduated
Jarrel Marshall	33	F	6'6"	185	Senior	Mount Vernon, NY	Graduated

=== Incoming transfers ===
Name	Number	Pos.	Height	Weight	Year	Hometown	Previous School
Crisshawn Clark	0	G	6'4"	210	Junior	Huber Heights, OH	Transferred from Pittsburgh. Under NCAA transfer rules, Clark will have to sit out for the 2017–18 season. Will have two years of remaining eligibility.
Josh McSwiggan	11	F	6'7"	200	RS Sophomore	Loughborough, England	Junior college transferred from Casper College
Austin Stone	34	F	6'9"		Junior	Clover, SC	Junior college transferred from USC Salkehatchie

=== Recruiting class of 2017 ===
College recruiting information
Name	Hometown	School	Height	Weight	Commit date
JoJo Walker; PG	Santa Maria, CA	Saint Joseph High School	6 ft 1 in (1.85 m)	160 lb (73 kg)	
JoJo Walker; PG	Recruit ratings: Scout: Rivals: (NR)				
Taki Fahrensohn; SF	Auckland, NZ	Auckland Grammar School	6 ft 6 in (1.98 m)	N/A	Nov 2, 2016
Taki Fahrensohn; SF	Recruit ratings: Scout: Rivals: (NR)				
Hugh Hogland; PF	Waimanalo, HI	Iolani School	6 ft 9 in (2.06 m)	235 lb (107 kg)	
Hugh Hogland; PF	Recruit ratings: Scout: Rivals: (NR)				
Tahirou Diabite; PF	Nagaoka, Japan	Meisei High School	6 ft 10 in (2.08 m)	235 lb (107 kg)	
Tahirou Diabite; PF	Recruit ratings: Scout: Rivals: (NR)				
Marcus Shaver; PG	Phoenix, AZ	St. Mary's High School	6 ft 1 in (1.85 m)	160 lb (73 kg)	
Marcus Shaver; PG	Recruit ratings: Scout: Rivals: (NR)				
Overall recruit ranking: Scout: nr Rivals: nr ESPN: nr
Note: In many cases, Scout, Rivals, 247Sports, On3, and ESPN may conflict in their listings of height and weight.; In these cases, the average was taken. ESPN grades are on a 100-point scale.; Sources: "Portland Pilots 2017 Basketball Commitments". Rivals.; "2017 Portland Pilots Basketball Commits". Scout.; "ESPN 2017 Portland Pilots Basketball recruits". ESPN.; "Scout.com Team Recruiting Rankings". Scout.; "2017 Team Ranking". Rivals.

=== Recruiting class of 2018 ===
College recruiting information (2018)
Name	Hometown	School	Height	Weight	Commit date
Josh Phillips; PF	Huntington Beach, CA	Edison High School	6 ft 8 in (2.03 m)	185 lb (84 kg)	Jul 23, 2017
Josh Phillips; PF	Recruit ratings: Scout: Rivals: (NR)				
Overall recruit ranking: Scout: nr Rivals: nr ESPN: nr
Note: In many cases, Scout, Rivals, 247Sports, On3, and ESPN may conflict in their listings of height and weight.; In these cases, the average was taken. ESPN grades are on a 100-point scale.; Sources: "Portland Pilots 2018 Basketball Commitments". Rivals.; "2018 Portland Pilots Basketball Commits". Scout.; "ESPN 2018 Portland Pilots Basketball recruits". ESPN.; "Scout.com Team Recruiting Rankings". Scout.; "2018 Team Ranking". Rivals.

== Roster ==
2017–18 Portland Pilots men's basketball team
Players
Coaches

Pos.	#	Name	Height	Weight	Year	Previous school	Hometown
G	0	Crisshawn Clark (redshirt)	6 ft 4 in (1.93 m)	210 lb (95 kg)	Jr	Cañada College/Pittsburgh; Wayne	Dayton, OH
G	1	Malcolm Porter	6 ft 3 in (1.91 m)	195 lb (88 kg)	RS Fr	Jesuit	Portland, OR
G	2	JoJo Walker	6 ft 1 in (1.85 m)	170 lb (77 kg)	Fr	St. Joseph	Carolina, PR
G	3	Rashad Jackson	6 ft 3 in (1.91 m)	180 lb (82 kg)	Jr	Impact Basketball Academy	Bakersfield, CA
G	5	D'Marques Tyson	6 ft 5 in (1.96 m)	215 lb (98 kg)	Sr	Quality Education Academy	Bothell, WA
G	10	Marcus Shaver Jr.	6 ft 2 in (1.88 m)	180 lb (82 kg)	Fr	Shadow Mountain	Phoenix, AZ
G/F	11	Josh McSwiggan	6 ft 7 in (2.01 m)	200 lb (91 kg)	RS So	UTEP/Casper College; Charnwood College	Loughborough, England
G	13	Franklin Porter	6 ft 4 in (1.93 m)	215 lb (98 kg)	RS So	Saint Mary's; Tilton School	Portland, OR
F	14	Tahirou Diabate	6 ft 9 in (2.06 m)	210 lb (95 kg)	Fr	Teikyo Nagaoka	Bamako, Mali
C	15	Philipp Hartwich	7 ft 2 in (2.18 m)	250 lb (113 kg)	Sr	Dreikonigs Gymnasium	Cologne, Germany
G	20	Takiula Faheresohn	6 ft 6 in (1.98 m)	175 lb (79 kg)	Fr	Auckland Grammar	Auckland, New Zealand
G	22	Brian Smith (W)	6 ft 2 in (1.88 m)	185 lb (84 kg)	Fr	Boise/SOE Prep	Boise, ID
F/C	32	Hugh Hogland (redshirt)	6 ft 9 in (2.06 m)	235 lb (107 kg)	Fr	ʻIolani School	Waimānalo, HI
F/C	34	Austin Stone	6 ft 8 in (2.03 m)	225 lb (102 kg)	Jr	USC Salkehatchie; Clover	Lake Wylie, SC
F/C	41	Joseph Smoyer	6 ft 10 in (2.08 m)	230 lb (104 kg)	So	Franklin	Portland, OR

Head coach

- Terry Porter (UW–Stevens Point)

Assistant coach(es)

- Bob Cantu (Chapman)
- Ben Johnson (Green Bay)
- Kramer Knutson (Portland)

Legend

- (C) Team captain
- (S) Suspended
- (I) Ineligible
- (W) Walk-on
- Injured
- Current redshirt

Roster

== Schedule and results ==
Date time, TV	Rank^{#}	Opponent^{#}	Result	Record	Site (attendance) city, state
Exhibition
Oct 29, 2017*; 5:00 pm		Eastern Washington; Hurricane Maria relief charity game	L 70–76		Chiles Center (500); Portland, OR
Nov 4, 2017*; 5:00 pm		Lewis & Clark	W 106–61		Chiles Center (1,421); Portland, OR
Non-conference regular season
Nov 11, 2017*; 7:00 pm, NBCSNW		Portland State	L 75–80	0–1	Chiles Center (3,019); Portland, OR
Nov 14, 2017*; 7:30 pm		Walla Walla	W 89–52	1–1	Chiles Center (1,333); Portland, OR
Nov 19, 2017*; 5:00 pm		Oregon Tech	W 86–59	2–1	Chiles Center (1,541); Portland, OR
Nov 23, 2017*; 11:30 am, ESPN		vs. No. 9 North Carolina; Phil Knight Invitational Quarterfinals	L 78–102	2–2	Moda Center (14,053); Portland, OR
Nov 24, 2017*; 3:00 pm, ESPN3		vs. Oklahoma; Phil Knight Invitational Consolation 2nd round	L 71–93	2–3	Veterans Memorial Coliseum (6,603); Portland, OR
Nov 26, 2017*; 4:00 pm, ESPNU		vs. DePaul; Phil Knight Invitational 7th place game	L 69–82	2–4	Veterans Memorial Coliseum (2,771); Portland, OR
Nov 30, 2017*; 7:00 pm		Multnomah	W 112–65	3–4	Chiles Center (1,281); Portland, OR
Dec 3, 2017*; 1:00 pm		at Boise State	L 54–77	3–5	Taco Bell Arena (4,518); Boise, ID
Dec 6, 2017*; 7:00 pm, NBCSNW		Cal State Fullerton	L 66–76	3–6	Chiles Center; Portland, OR
Dec 9, 2017*; 7:00 pm		San Jose State	W 64–55	4–6	Chiles Center (2,098); Portland, OR
Dec 16, 2017*; 7:00 pm		at Seattle	L 76–89	4–7	KeyArena (1,569); Seattle, WA
Dec 19, 2017*; 7:00 pm		Hartford	W 78–67	5–7	Chiles Center (1,191); Portland, OR
Dec 21, 2017*; 5:30 pm		vs. Sacramento State; Sacramento Showcase	W 80–75	6–7	Golden 1 Center (7,880); Sacramento, CA
WCC regular season
Dec 28, 2017; 6:00 pm, BYUtv		at BYU	L 45–69	6–8 (0–1)	Marriott Center (16,592); Provo, UT
Dec 30, 2017; 6:00 pm, RTNW		San Francisco	L 61–84	6–9 (0–2)	Chiles Center (2,007); Portland, OR
Jan 4, 2018; 7:00 pm, RTNW		San Diego	L 74–81 ^{OT}	6–10 (0–3)	Chiles Center (1,396); Portland, OR
Jan 6, 2018; 7:00 pm		at Santa Clara	L 68–70	6–11 (0–4)	Leavey Center (1,688); Santa Clara, CA
Jan 11, 2018; 6:00 pm, RTNW		at No. 15 Gonzaga	L 57–103	6–12 (0–5)	McCarthey Athletic Center (6,000); Spokane, WA
Jan 13, 2018; 7:00 pm, RTNW		Pacific	L 54–66	6–13 (0–6)	Chiles Center (1,945); Portland, OR
Jan 18, 2018; 7:00 pm, RTNW		at San Diego	W 55–49	7–13 (1–6)	Jenny Craig Pavilion (2,047); San Diego, CA
Jan 20, 2018; 7:00 pm, RTNW		at Loyola Marymount	W 72–65	8–13 (2–6)	Gersten Pavilion (1,283); Los Angeles, CA
Jan 25, 2018; 8:00 pm, ESPNU		No. 15 Gonzaga	L 79–95	8–14 (2–7)	Chiles Center (4,557); Portland, OR
Jan 27, 2018; 8:00 pm, RTNW		at No. 16 Saint Mary's	L 55–72	8–15 (2–8)	McKeon Pavilion (3,500); Moraga, CA
Feb 1, 2018; 8:00 pm		Pepperdine	W 85–76 ^{OT}	9–15 (3–8)	Chiles Center (1,772); Portland, OR
Feb 3, 2018; 1:00 pm, RTNW		Loyola Marymount	W 68–66	10–15 (4–8)	Chiles Center (2,119); Portland, OR
Feb 8, 2018; 7:00 pm		at San Francisco	L 63–65	10–16 (4–9)	War Memorial Gymnasium (1,262); San Francisco, CA
Feb 10, 2018; 7:00 pm		at Pacific	L 58–60	10–17 (4–10)	Alex G. Spanos Center; Stockton, CA
Feb 15, 2018; 7:00 pm		Santa Clara	L 72–81	10–18 (4–11)	Chiles Center (2,031); Portland, OR
Feb 17, 2018; 7:00 pm, RTNW		No. 15 Saint Mary's	L 61–73	10–19 (4–12)	Chiles Center (4,547); Portland, OR
Feb 22, 2018; 8:00 pm, ESPNU		BYU	L 60–72	10–20 (4–13)	Chiles Center (3,003); Portland, OR
Feb 24, 2018; 5:00 pm		at Pepperdine	L 64–75	10–21 (4–14)	Firestone Fieldhouse (725); Malibu, CA
WCC tournament
Mar 2, 2018; 6:00 pm, RTNW	(9)	vs. (8) Loyola Marymount; First round	L 72–78	10–22	Orleans Arena (6,747); Paradise, NV
*Non-conference game. ^{#}Rankings from AP Poll. (#) Tournament seedings in parentheses. All times are in Pacific Time.

Source: Schedule
