= 2017–18 Loyola Marymount Lions men's basketball team =

American college basketball season

2017–18 Loyola Marymount Lions men's basketball
- Conference: West Coast Conference
- Record: 11–20 (5–13 WCC)
- Head coach: Mike Dunlap (4th season)
- Assistant coaches: Brannon Hays; Patrick Sandle; Derrick Clark
- Home arena: Gersten Pavilion

2017–18 West Coast Conference men's basketball standings
| | Conf. | | | | Overall |
| Team | W | | L | PCT | W | | L | PCT |
|---|---|---|---|---|---|---|---|---|
| No. 8 Gonzaga † | 17 | – | 1 | .944 | 32 | – | 5 | .865 |
| No. 25 Saint Mary's | 16 | – | 2 | .889 | 30 | – | 6 | .833 |
| BYU | 11 | – | 7 | .611 | 24 | – | 11 | .686 |
| San Diego | 9 | – | 9 | .500 | 20 | – | 14 | .588 |
| San Francisco | 9 | – | 9 | .500 | 22 | – | 17 | .564 |
| Pacific | 9 | – | 9 | .500 | 14 | – | 18 | .438 |
| Santa Clara | 8 | – | 10 | .444 | 11 | – | 20 | .355 |
| Loyola Marymount | 5 | – | 13 | .278 | 11 | – | 20 | .355 |
| Portland | 4 | – | 14 | .222 | 10 | – | 22 | .313 |
| Pepperdine | 2 | – | 16 | .111 | 6 | – | 26 | .188 |
† Conference tournament winner Rankings from AP poll

The 2017–18 Loyola Marymount Lions men's basketball team represented Loyola Marymount University during the 2017–18 NCAA Division I men's basketball season. The Lions were led by fourth-year head coach Mike Dunlap. They played their home games at Gersten Pavilion in Los Angeles, California as members of the West Coast Conference. They finished the season 11–20, 5–13 in WCC play to finish in eighth place. They defeated Portland in the first round of the WCC tournament before losing in the quarterfinals to Gonzaga.

== Previous season ==
The Lions finished the 2016–17 season 15–15, 8–10 in WCC play to finish in sixth place. They lost in the quarterfinals of the WCC tournament to BYU.

== Offseason ==
=== Departures ===
| Name | Number | Pos. | Height | Weight | Year | Hometown | Reason for departure |
|---|---|---|---|---|---|---|---|
| Kelvin Amayo | 2 | G | 6'4" | 225 | RS Senior | Newark, NJ | Graduated |
| Munis Tutu | 3 | G | 6'1" | 165 | Sophomore | Windsor, ON | Transferred to Carleton |
| Brandon Brown | 10 | G | 5'11" | 160 | Senior | Laveen, AZ | Graduated |
| Miles Crawford | 13 | G | 6'1" | 165 | Sophomore | Denton, TX | Walk-on; transferred |
| Stefan Jovanovic | 15 | C | 6'10" | 235 | Senior | Kraljevo, Serbia | Graduated |
| Buay Tuach | 22 | G/F | 6'6" | 185 | Senior | Omaha, NE | Graduated |
| Shamar Johnson | 24 | F | 6'7" | 255 | Senior | Pensacola, FL | Graduated |
| Trevor Manuel | 34 | F | 6'9" | 185 | Sophomore | Lansing, MI | Transferred to Olivet College |

=== Incoming transfers ===
| Name | Number | Pos. | Height | Weight | Year | Hometown | Notes |
|---|---|---|---|---|---|---|---|
| Cameron Allen | 3 | G | 6'0" | | Sophomore | Greenville, SC | Junior college transferred from Pensacola JC. |
| James Batemon III | 5 | G | 6'1" | 175 | Junior | Milwaukee, WI | Junior college transferred from North Dakota State College of Science. |

=== 2017 recruiting class ===
College recruiting information
| Name | Hometown | School | Height | Weight | Commit date |
|---|---|---|---|---|---|
| Eli Scott #54 SF | Chino Hills, CA | Chino Hills High School | 6 ft 4 in (1.93 m) | 190 lb (86 kg) | Sep 9, 2016 |
| Eli Scott #54 SF | Recruit ratings: Scout: Rivals: (75) | | | | |
| Zafir Williams #79 PF | Long Beach, CA | Long Beach Polytechnic High School | 6 ft 5 in (1.96 m) | 175 lb (79 kg) | Jul 20, 2016 |
| Zafir Williams #79 PF | Recruit ratings: Scout: Rivals: (72) | | | | |
| Joe Quintana #81 PG | La Verne, CA | Bonita High School | 6 ft 1 in (1.85 m) | 155 lb (70 kg) | Jul 20, 2016 |
| Joe Quintana #81 PG | Recruit ratings: Scout: Rivals: (64) | | | | |
Overall recruit ranking: Scout: nr Rivals: nr ESPN: nr
Note: In many cases, Scout, Rivals, 247Sports, On3, and ESPN may conflict in their listings of height and weight.; In these cases, the average was taken. ESPN grades are on a 100-point scale.; Sources: "Loyola Marymount Lions 2017 Basketball Commitments". Rivals.; "2017 Loyola Marymount Lions Basketball Commits". Scout.; "ESPN 2017 Loyola Marymount Lions Basketball recruits". ESPN.; "Scout.com Team Recruiting Rankings". Scout.; "2017 Team Ranking". Rivals.

== Roster ==
2017–18 Loyola Marymount Lions men's basketball team
Players
Coaches

| Pos. | # | Name | Height | Weight | Year | Previous school | Hometown |
|---|---|---|---|---|---|---|---|
| F | 0 | Eli Scott | 6 ft 5 in (1.96 m) | 224 lb (102 kg) | Fr | Chino Hills HS | Chino Hills, CA |
| F | 1 | Zafir Williams | 6 ft 6 in (1.98 m) | 254 lb (115 kg) | Fr | Long Beach Poly | Long Beach, CA |
| G | 2 | Donald Gipson | 6 ft 3 in (1.91 m) | 197 lb (89 kg) | RS Fr | Fairfax HS | Los Angeles, CA |
| G | 3 | Cameron Allen | 6 ft 2 in (1.88 m) | 176 lb (80 kg) | So | Forest Trail Academy; Pensacola State College | Greenville, SC |
| G | 5 | James Batemon III | 6 ft 1 in (1.85 m) | 188 lb (85 kg) | Jr | University HS; North Dakota State College of Science | Milwaukee, WI |
| F | 11 | Petr Herman | 6 ft 10 in (2.08 m) | 231 lb (105 kg) | Sr | Canarias Academy | Central Bohemian Region, Czech Republic |
| G/F | 12 | Steven Haney | 6 ft 6 in (1.98 m) | 197 lb (89 kg) | RS Sr | St. Aquinas HS; Central Florida | Fort Lauderdale, FL |
| F | 13 | Mikail Simmons | 6 ft 8 in (2.03 m) | 212 lb (96 kg) | Fr | Plano East HS | Plano, TX |
| C | 14 | Mattias Markusson | 7 ft 3 in (2.21 m) | 248 lb (112 kg) | So | Kfum Jämtland BBK | Vasterled, Stockholm, Sweden |
| G | 15 | Joe Quintana | 6 ft 2 in (1.88 m) | 164 lb (74 kg) | Fr | Bonita HS | West Covina, CA |
| G | 20 | Erik Johansson (W) | 6 ft 6 in (1.98 m) | 185 lb (84 kg) | So | Täljegymnasiet | Södertälje, Sweden |
| F | 22 | Dylan Causwell | 6 ft 7 in (2.01 m) | 197 lb (89 kg) | Jr | Combine Preparatory Academy; Santa Fe College | Johns Creek, GA |
| G | 25 | Jeffery McClendon | 6 ft 2 in (1.88 m) | 210 lb (95 kg) | Jr | Eastside HS | Lancaster, CA |
| F | 34 | Liam Eberhardt (W) | 6 ft 7 in (2.01 m) | 190 lb (86 kg) | Fr | Bishop Blanchet HS | Seattle, WA |

Head coach

- Mike Dunlap (Loyola Marymount)

Assistant coach(es)

- Brannon Hays (Cal Lutheran)
- Patrick Sandle (San Francisco State)
- Derrick Clark (Cal Lutheran)

Legend

- (C) Team captain
- (S) Suspended
- (I) Ineligible
- (W) Walk-on
- Injured
- Current redshirt

Roster

== Schedule and results ==
| Date time, TV | Rank^{#} | Opponent^{#} | Result | Record | Site (attendance) city, state |
Exhibition
| Nov 3, 2017*; 7:00 pm | | Vanguard | W 98–67 | | Gersten Pavilion; Los Angeles, CA |
Non-conference regular season
| Nov 11, 2017*; 5:00 pm | | at Texas–Arlington | L 80–85 | 0–1 | College Park Center (4,379); Arlington, TX |
| Nov 15, 2017*; 7:00 pm | | UC Riverside | W 76–64 | 1–1 | Gersten Pavilion (891); Los Angeles, CA |
| Nov 19, 2017*; 7:00 pm | | McNeese State | W 92–86 ^{OT} | 2–1 | Gersten Pavilion (718); Los Angeles, CA |
| Nov 22, 2017*; 3:00 pm | | at Incarnate Word | W 91–87 | 3–1 | McDermott Convocation Center (1,588); San Antonio, TX |
| Nov 25, 2017*; 6:00 pm | | at Boise State | L 48–68 | 3–2 | Taco Bell Arena (5,750); Boise, ID |
| Nov 28, 2017*; 7:30 pm | | Cal State Los Angeles | W 87–66 | 4–2 | Gersten Pavilion (677); Los Angeles, CA |
| Dec 2, 2017*; 2:00 pm, P12N | | at Oregon State | L 74–78 | 4–3 | Gill Coliseum (3,985); Corvallis, OR |
| Dec 6, 2017*; 7:00 pm | | Portland State | L 85–94 | 4–4 | Gersten Pavilion (857); Los Angeles, CA |
| Dec 9, 2017*; 7:00 pm | | at Cal State Northridge | W 74–57 | 5–4 | Matadome (745); Northridge, CA |
| Dec 17, 2017*; 3:00 pm, P12N | | at Washington | L 78–80 | 5–5 | Alaska Airlines Arena (4,856); Seattle, WA |
| Dec 22, 2017*; 7:00 pm | | Cal State Fullerton | L 80–88 | 5–6 | Gersten Pavilion (933); Los Angeles, CA |
WCC regular season
| Dec 28, 2017; 8:00 pm, SPCSN | | at Saint Mary's | L 59–87 | 5–7 (0–1) | McKeon Pavilion (3,062); Moraga, CA |
| Dec 30, 2018; 7:00 pm | | at Pacific | L 82–88 | 5–8 (0–2) | Alex G. Spanos Center (1,400); Stockton, CA |
| Jan 4, 2018; 7:00 pm, SPCSN | | Santa Clara | L 49–65 | 5–9 (0–3) | Gersten Pavilion (773); Los Angeles, CA |
| Jan 6, 2018; 7:00 pm, ESPNU | | No. 19 Gonzaga | L 66–85 | 5–10 (0–4) | Gersten Pavilion (2,782); Los Angeles, CA |
| Jan 11, 2018; 7:30 pm, SPCSN | | San Francisco | W 67–65 | 6–10 (1–4) | Gersten Pavilion (1,032); Los Angeles, CA |
| Jan 13, 2018; 7:00 pm, SPCSN | | at San Diego | L 71–75 | 6–11 (1–5) | Jenny Craig Pavilion (1,627); San Diego, CA |
| Jan 18, 2018; 8:00 pm, ESPNU | | at BYU | L 67–82 | 6–12 (1–6) | Marriott Center (12,109); Provo, UT |
| Jan 20, 2018; 7:00 pm, SPCSN | | Portland | L 65–72 | 6–13 (1–7) | Gersten Pavilion (1,283); Los Angeles, CA |
| Jan 25, 2018; 7:00 pm, SPCSN | | at Pepperdine | L 70–71 | 6–14 (1–8) | Firestone Fieldhouse (811); Malibu, CA |
| Jan 27, 2018; 1:00 pm, SPCSN | | San Diego | L 82–89 | 6–15 (1–9) | Gersten Pavilion (937); Los Angeles, CA |
| Feb 1, 2018; 8:00 pm, SPCSN | | BYU | W 76–69 | 7–15 (2–9) | Gersten Pavilion (1,180); Los Angeles, CA |
| Feb 3, 2018; 1:00 pm, SPCSN | | at Portland | L 66–68 | 7–16 (2–10) | Chiles Center (2,119); Portland, OR |
| Feb 8, 2018; 7:00 pm | | No. 11 Saint Mary's | L 62–83 | 7–17 (2–11) | Gersten Pavilion (1,258); Los Angeles, CA |
| Feb 10, 2018; 3:00 pm | | Pepperdine | W 85–79 | 8–17 (3–11) | Gersten Pavilion (3,150); Los Angeles, CA |
| Feb 15, 2018; 6:00 pm, KHQ/RTNW | | at No. 9 Gonzaga | L 46–76 | 8–18 (3–12) | McCarthey Athletic Center (6,000); Spokane, WA |
| Feb 17, 2018; 3:00 pm, SPCSN | | at San Francisco | L 63–72 | 8–19 (3–13) | War Memorial Gymnasium (1,882); San Francisco, CA |
| Feb 22, 2018; 7:00 pm | | at Santa Clara | W 65–64 | 9–19 (4–13) | Leavey Center (2,408); Santa Clara, CA |
| Feb 24, 2018; 1:00 pm, SPCSN | | Pacific | W 74–71 | 10–19 (5–13) | Gersten Pavilion (872); Los Angeles, CA |
WCC tournament
| Mar 2, 2018; 6:00 pm, SPCSN | (8) | vs. (9) Portland; First round | W 78–72 | 11–19 | Orleans Arena (6,747); Paradise, NV |
| Mar 3, 2018; 7:00 pm, ESPN2 | (8) | vs. (1) No. 7 Gonzaga; Quarterfinals | L 69–83 | 11–20 | Orleans Arena (7,279); Paradise, NV |
*Non-conference game. ^{#}Rankings from AP Poll. (#) Tournament seedings in parentheses.
