= 2017 NCAA Division I men's basketball championship game =

College basketball tournament game

National championship game
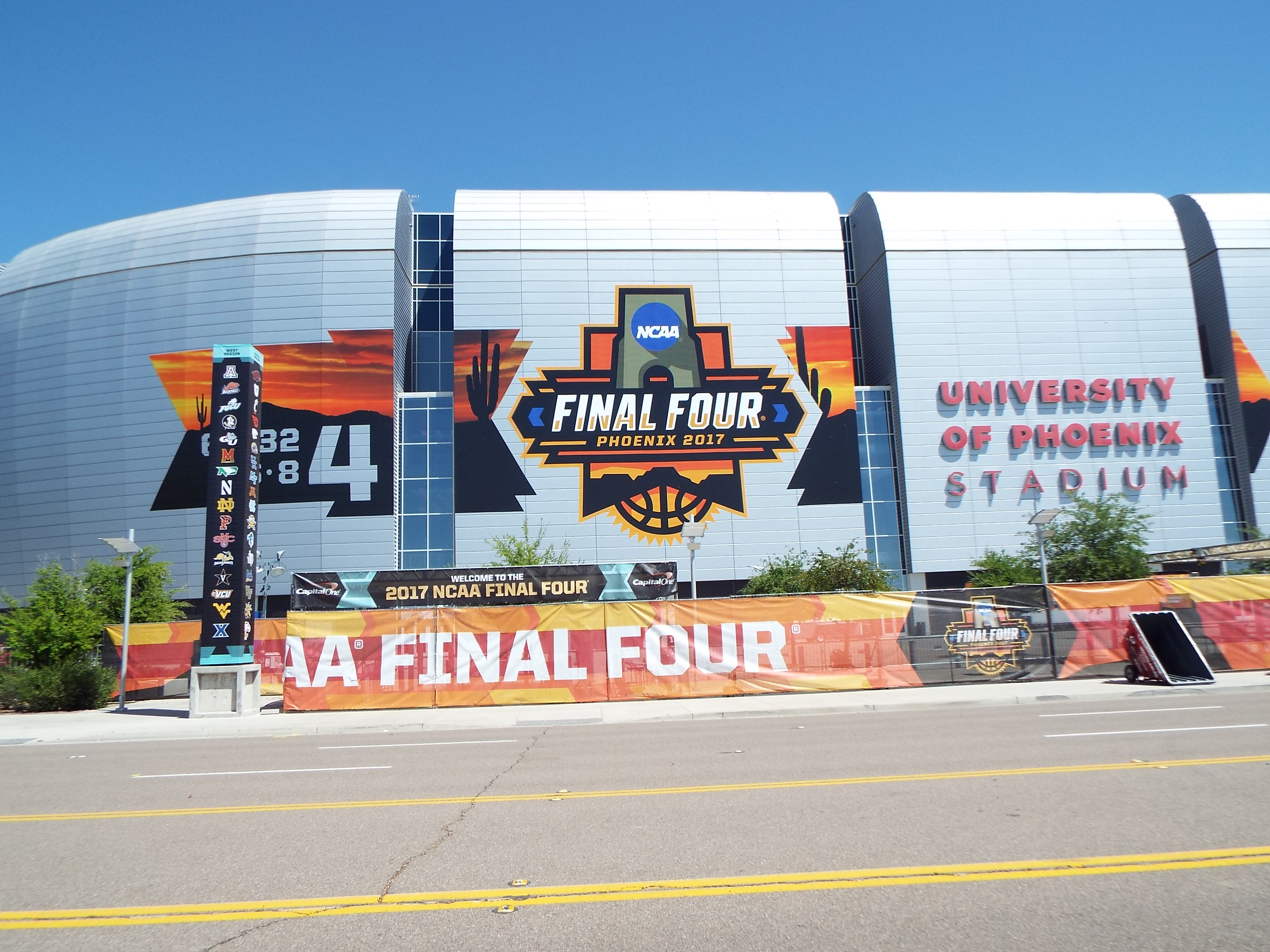
- University of Phoenix Stadium before the NCAA men's Final Four.
Gonzaga Bulldogs	North Carolina Tar Heels
WCC	ACC
(37–1)	(32–7)
65	71
Head coach: Mark Few	Head coach: Roy Williams
- AP: 2
- Coaches: 2
- AP: 5
- Coaches: 8
	1st half	2nd half	Total
Gonzaga Bulldogs	35	30	65
North Carolina Tar Heels	32	39	71
- Date: April 3, 2017
- Venue: University of Phoenix Stadium, Glendale, Arizona
- MVP: Joel Berry II, North Carolina
- Favorite: North Carolina by 2
- Referees: Verne Harris, Michael Stephens, & Mike Eades
- Attendance: 76,168

United States TV coverage
- Network: CBS
- Announcers: Jim Nantz (play-by-play); Bill Raftery and Grant Hill (color); Tracy Wolfson (sideline)
- Nielsen Ratings: 14.5/24 (22.998 million viewers)

The 2017 NCAA Division I men's basketball championship game was the final game of the 2017 NCAA Division I men's basketball tournament. It determined the national champion for the 2016–17 NCAA Division I men's basketball season. The game was played on April 3, 2017, at University of Phoenix Stadium, now known as State Farm Stadium, in Glendale, Arizona, between the Gonzaga Bulldogs and the North Carolina Tar Heels. North Carolina defeated Gonzaga, 71–65, to win its sixth men's basketball national championship.

This was the first national championship game to be played in a state in either the Mountain or Pacific time zones since the 1995 game, which was held at the Kingdome in Seattle, Washington. North Carolina was playing in its second consecutive title game (and eleventh overall), after losing to Villanova at the buzzer the previous year. Meanwhile, Gonzaga was playing in its first-ever title game. It was the second national title game in three years – and the eighth overall – to be played between two No. 1 seeds.

== Background ==
=== Gonzaga Bulldogs ===
In his seventeenth year at the helm, Gonzaga head coach Mark Few led the team to its first Final Four and national championship game in school history, following a sweet sixteen appearance the year before. The team opened the season winning their first two games prior to competing in the AdvoCare Invitational. The Bulldogs beat Quinnipiac and Florida in order to reach the championship game versus Iowa State. The Bulldogs jumped out to an early lead and held it through half time, reaching eighteen points in the second-half. However, with four minutes to go the Cyclones rallied to cut the Bulldogs' lead to one at 70–69. Gonzaga won the game 72–71 as Iowa State missed a potential three-point shot as time expired to leave. This was their third time winning the event after previously doing so in 2008 and 2012. Following their defeat of South Dakota, Gonzaga entered their conference season with an undefeated record and broke the school record for most consecutive wins to start a season with twelve.

After a 29–1 regular season and winning the 2017 West Coast Conference regular season championship, Gonzaga beat Pacific and Santa Clara en route to the 2017 West Coast Conference tournament finals, where they defeated Saint Mary's. The Bulldogs were the #1 seed in the West Regional of the 2017 NCAA Tournament.

In the first round of the tournament, after a tightly contested first half against South Dakota State, Jordan Mathews' 16 points and Przemek Karnowski's three consecutive baskets built a 20-point lead with 5 minutes left, helping Gonzaga to come away with a 66–46 win. In the second-round game against Northwestern, Wildcat head coach Chris Collins, trailing by five with five minutes left – after trailing by as many as 22 in the second half – stomped onto the court when a goal-tending call was missed. Collins subsequently drew a technical foul, thereby dooming Northwestern's chances of winning the game, as Gonzaga would prevail to win 79–73.

In Gonzaga's Sweet 16 game against West Virginia, Mathews hit a go-ahead three-pointer with less than a minute remaining to give Gonzaga a 60–58 lead. Gonzaga won the game 61–58 and advanced to the Elite Eight. In the Elite Eight, led by Nigel Williams-Goss' 23-point performance, Gonzaga routed Xavier 83–59 to reach the Final Four for the first time in school history.

Gonzaga defeated South Carolina 77–73 in the Final Four led by 23 points from Williams-Goss and 27 points from Gonzaga's big men. A Josh Perkins foul preventing Sindarius Thornwell's game-tying three-pointer with 3.5 seconds left enabled the Bulldogs to advance to the championship game.

=== North Carolina Tar Heels ===
After a 26–6 regular season, North Carolina beat Miami (FL) in the ACC tournament before losing to Duke in the semifinals. Despite the loss, North Carolina was selected as the top seed in the South regional as an at-large.

In the first round of the tournament, Justin Jackson broke out of a shooting slump and led North Carolina with 21 points to a 103–64 win over Texas Southern. In the second round against Arkansas, after blowing a 17-point first half lead and trailing 65–60 with under three minutes remaining, Kennedy Meeks led a North Carolina comeback with 16 points and a huge tip-in with 44.2 seconds remaining to put UNC ahead 68–65 as they survived to win 72–65, and advance to the Sweet 16.

In the Sweet 16, Joel Berry II and Jackson led North Carolina to a 92–80 win over Butler with 26 and 24 points, respectively, to advance to the Elite Eight for the 26th time in program history. In an Elite Eight showdown between two college basketball blue bloods, North Carolina beat Kentucky 75–73 on a jump shot by Luke Maye with 0.3 seconds left, advancing to its second consecutive appearance – and record-setting 20th overall appearance – in the Final Four. Maye's shot is additionally remarkable for its similarities to Duke player Christian Laettner's shot against Kentucky in the 1992 Elite Eight 25 years earlier. Both Maye and Laettner wore the number 32; both games involved a No. 1 seed blue-wearing team from North Carolina playing against No. 2 seed Kentucky in the Elite Eight; and both scored a long two-pointer at or near the buzzer to win the game. Laettner himself noted the similarities in a tweet.

Next, North Carolina defeated Oregon 77–76 in the Final Four to advance to the championship game. Meeks led the Tar Heels with a double-double – a career-high 25 points and 14 rebounds – including an important offensive rebound of a Berry missed free throw with 4.0 seconds left to clinch the victory.

=== Team rosters ===
2016–17 Gonzaga Bulldogs roster
No.	Name	Position	Height	Weight	Class
0	Silas Melson	G	6-4	195	Jr.
2	Jack Beach	G	6-2	175	So.
3	Johnathan Williams	F	6-9	228	Rs. Jr.
4	Jordan Mathews	G	6-4	203	Sr.
5	Nigel Williams-Goss	G	6-3	195	Rs. Jr.
10	Bryan Alberts	G	6-5	198	Rs. So.
13	Josh Perkins	G	6-3	190	Rs. So.
14	Jacob Larsen	C	6-11	227	Fr.
15	Rem Bakamus	G	6-0	173	Rs. Sr.
21	Rui Hachimura	F	6-8	225	Fr.
22	Jeremy Jones	F	6-6	210	Rs. So.
23	Zach Norvell Jr.	G	6-5	205	Fr.
24	Przemek Karnowski	C	7-1	300	Rs Sr.
25	Ryan Edwards	C	7-1	230	Rs. Jr.
32	Zach Collins	F	7-0	230	Fr.
33	Killian Tillie	F	6-10	200	Fr.
55	Duane Triano	G	6-3	180	Rs. Jr.

2016–17 North Carolina Tar Heels roster
No.	Name	Position	Height	Weight	Class
0	Nate Britt	G	6-1	175	Sr.
1	Theo Pinson	F/G	6-6	211	Jr.
2	Joel Berry II	G	6-0	195	Jr.
3	Kennedy Meeks	F	6-10	260	Sr.
4	Isaiah Hicks	F	6-9	242	Jr.
5	Tony Bradley	F	6-10	240	Fr.
11	Shea Rush	F	6-6	200	Fr.
13	Kanler Coker	G	6-4	200	Sr.
14	Brandon Robinson	G	6-5	162	Fr.
21	Seventh Woods	G	6-2	180	Fr.
24	Kenny Williams	G	6-4	180	So.
25	Aaron Rohlman	F	6-6	210	Jr.
30	Stilman White	G	6-1	178	Jr.
32	Luke Maye	F	6-8	235	So.
44	Justin Jackson	F/G	6-8	210	Jr.

=== Media coverage ===
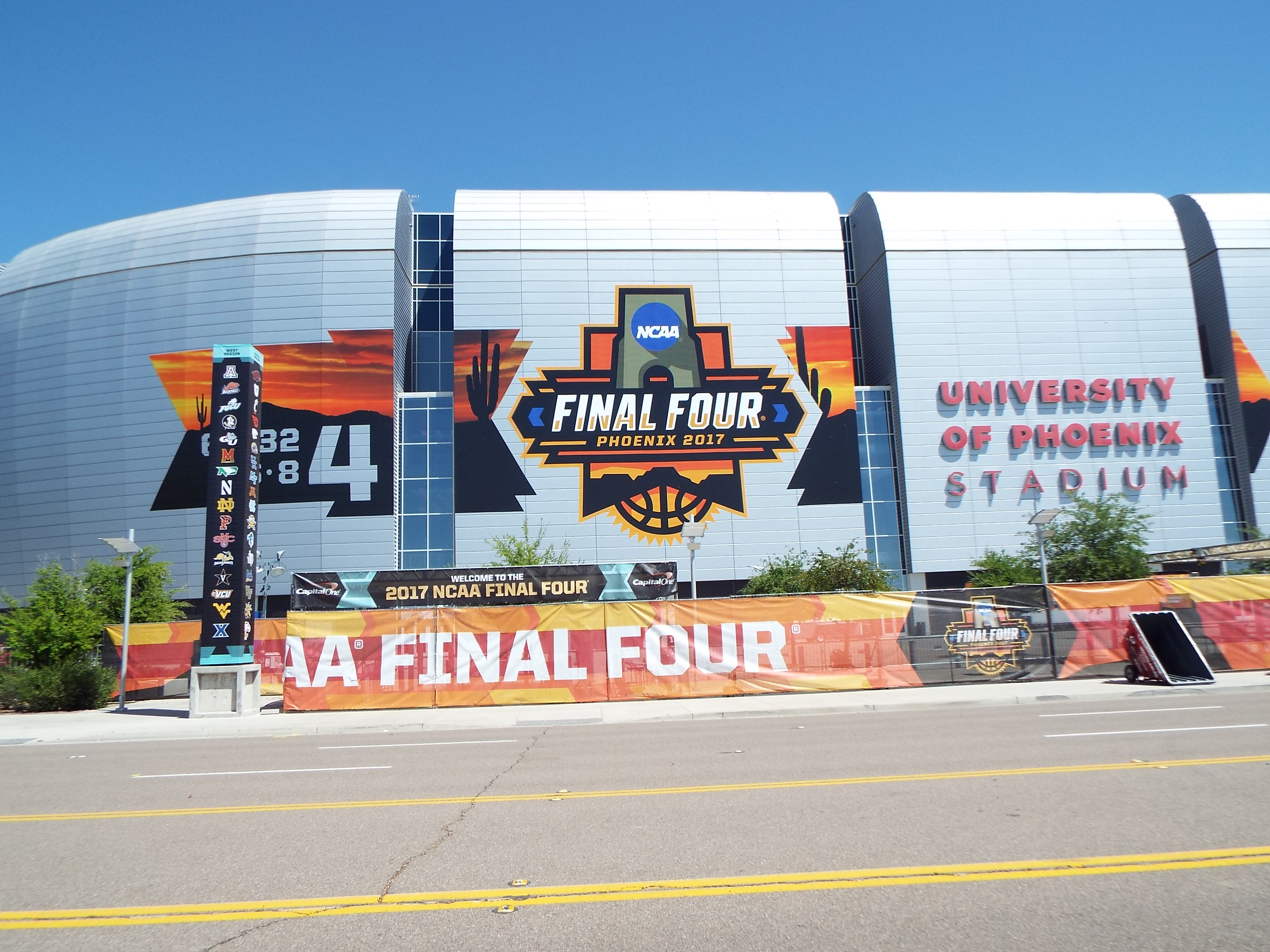
University of Phoenix Stadium, the site of the 2017 NCAA Division I men's basketball championship game

The game was televised in the United States by CBS. ESPN International had the media rights outside of the United States.

Radio coverage in the United States was provided by Westwood One.

== Starting lineups ==
Gonzaga	Position		North Carolina
Nigel Williams-Goss	G		Joel Berry II
Jordan Mathews	G	G/F	Theo Pinson
Josh Perkins	F		Isaiah Hicks
Johnathan Williams	F	G/F	† Justin Jackson
Przemek Karnowski	C	F	Kennedy Meeks
† 2017 Consensus First Team All-American

== Game summary ==
CBS

Monday, April 3, 2017
6:20 pm MST

Box score

#W1 Gonzaga Bulldogs 65, #S1 North Carolina Tar Heels 71
Scoring by half: 35–32, 30–39
Pts: N. Williams-Goss – 15; Rebs: N. Williams-Goss – 9 Asts: N. Williams-Goss – 6	Pts: Joel Berry II – 22; Rebs: Kennedy Meeks – 10; Asts: Joel Berry II – 6

University of Phoenix Stadium, Glendale, Arizona
Attendance: 76,168
Referees: Verne Harris, Michael Stephens, Mike Eades

Gonzaga led North Carolina at the half, 35–32. North Carolina outscored Gonzaga in the second half, 39–30, to win the championship. Gonzaga was up two points with 1:52 remaining, but North Carolina came back and clinched the victory in the closing minutes.

North Carolina won despite a poor (4-for-27) conversion rate of 3-point shots, and the Tar Heels made more points from free-throw conversions (15-for-26). The game included a total of 44 fouls. Overall, there were 26 free-throws for each side, leading the Associated Press report to deride the game as merely a free-throw contest.

== Criticism ==
In contrast to the positive reaction to the previous year's title game—in which UNC lost to Villanova at the buzzer—many criticized the quality of play in the 2017 championship. North Carolina head coach Roy Williams did so as well, commenting during the trophy presentation ceremony that "neither team played very well."

The media generally blamed officiating for the game's low quality. Both teams were in the bonus eight minutes into the second half. The Associated Press labeled the game "unwatchable." Mark Tracy of the New York Times declared it a "sluggish slog of a national title game." Myron Medcalf, writing for ESPN, wrote that the game was blighted with "an abundance of foul calls, poor offense and a sleep-inducing rhythm." Chris Chase of Fox Sports lamented how the referees had "ruined" the contest through a combination of incorrect foul calls, missed calls, and superfluous use of instant replay. Tom Ley of Deadspin condemned the game as "memorably disgusting."

Multiple prominent current and former basketball players vocalized their distaste for the game's quality of officiating on social media, including LeBron James, Dwyane Wade, James Worthy, and Jay Williams.
