= Seventh Woods =

American basketball player (born 1998)

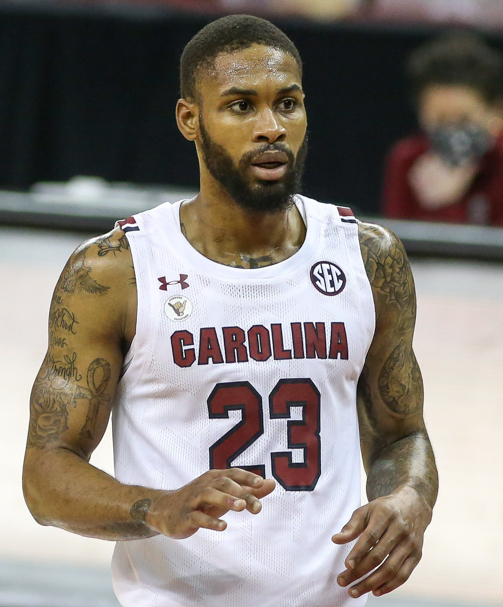
- Woods with South Carolina in 2021

No. 7 – Zamora Jaguars
- Position: Point guard / shooting guard
- League: Liga Ecuatoriana de Baloncesto

Personal information
- Born: August 7, 1998 (age 27) Columbia, South Carolina, U.S.
- Listed height: 6 ft 2 in (1.88 m)
- Listed weight: 184 lb (83 kg)

Career information
- High school: Hammond School (Columbia, South Carolina)
- College: North Carolina (2016–2019); South Carolina (2020–2021); Morgan State (2021–2022)
- NBA draft: 2022: undrafted
- Playing career: 2023–present

Career history
- 2023–2024: UCC Demons
- 2024–present: Zamora Jaguars

Career highlights
- Irish National Cup winner (2024); Irish National Cup Final MVP (2024); Super League All-Star First Team (2024); NCAA champion (2017); South Carolina Mr. Basketball (2016)
Medals
Men's basketball
Representing the United States
FIBA Americas U16 Championship
Gold medal – first place	2013 Uruguay	Team

Seventh Day'Vonte Woods (born August 7, 1998) is an American professional basketball player for Zamora Jaguars of the Liga Ecuatoriana de Baloncesto. He played college basketball for the North Carolina Tar Heels, South Carolina Gamecocks and Morgan State Bears.

== Early life ==
Woods was born on August 7, 1998, in Columbia, South Carolina. His first name is derived from the seven-day Genesis creation narrative. Woods is the youngest of four brothers and started playing basketball when he was four years old.

== High school career ==
As an 8th grader, he averaged 14.6 points per game. As a freshman, Woods averaged 19.3 points per game and earned the Hammond basketball player of the year, aiding his team to a 22–5 record and the SCISA Class AAA state championship game. Woods gained national notoriety from a viral Hoopmixtape montage titled "Seventh Woods Is The BEST 14 Year Old In The Country! CRAZY Athlete," still the most viewed video in the page's history as of December 2025. His sophomore season, he averaged 20 points per game, while also averaging 4 steals, 3.8 assists, and 3.6 rebounds and earned the South Carolina boys basketball player of the year and was selected for the U16 USA National Team. His team went 5–0 and won the U16 Championship. As a junior in 2014–15, Woods averaged 16.3 points, 3.5 rebounds, 3.7 assists, and 3.6 steals per game while leading Hammond to a state championship in 2015. After the conclusion of his junior season, Woods joined his AAU team, Carolina Wolves on the Under Armour Association Circuit. Woods averaged 16.9 Points per game and 3.5 Assists per game on the Under Armour Association Circuit. Woods also played in the Elite 24 Invitational game in Brooklyn, New York in the summer of 2015. As a senior in 2015–16, he averaged 18.9 points per game, 4.5 rebounds per game, 5.0 assists per game and 3.5 steals per game. Named a 4-star recruit by ESPN, Woods at that time was ranked 54th in the nation and 14th among points guards in the Class of 2016.

Woods was heavily recruited by the universities of North Carolina and South Carolina and signed with North Carolina on November 11, 2014.

== College career ==
=== North Carolina ===
As a freshman, Woods played in all 40 games, tying a school record. He averaged nearly eight minutes per game, mainly in relief to the starting point guard Joel Berry. He had his best game of the season against Duke, where he scored four points and led the team with four assists. North Carolina received a one-seed in the 2017 NCAA Tournament and proceeded to win the national championship. Woods appeared in all six of UNC's tournament games, playing a total of 30 minutes and recording two points, four assists, three steals and three rebounds across the six tournament games. He played three minutes in the Tar Heels' championship game victory over Gonzaga but did not record any stats.

In his sophomore year, Woods was limited by a stress fracture in his foot; he missed 17 games due to the injury. Before his injury, he tied his career-high in scoring with nine points in the season opener against Northern Iowa.

During the offseason, Woods was in a competition for the starting point guard role with Coby White but did not get the job. In his junior season, Woods started one game against UNCW when White was out with an ankle injury. He had the best game of his college career when UNC got a signature win over Gonzaga, who at the time was ranked fourth in the country. He set a new career-high in scoring with 14 points. On April 25, 2019, Woods announced that he would transfer from North Carolina.

=== South Carolina ===
On June 7, 2019, Woods announced he would transfer to South Carolina. He redshirted the 2019-20 season that was eventually cut short due to COVID-19. In the 2020-21 season, Woods started 13 games and averaged 5.4 points, 1.7 rebounds, 1.9 assists, and 1.1 steals per game as a senior.

=== Morgan State ===
On June 21, 2021, Woods announced he was transferring to Morgan State for his extra season of eligibility that was granted to all athletes due to the effects of COVID-19. In his final year, he started 18 games and averaged 4.7 points, 2.0 rebounds, 2.1 assists, and 0.6 steals per game.

== Professional career ==
=== UCC Demons (2023–2024) ===
In July 2023, Woods signed his first professional contract with UCC Demons of the Super League. In January 2024, he helped the team win the National Cup with an 82–68 win over Ballincollig in the final. He scored a team-high 22 points and was named joint-MVP of the final with James Hannigan. For the season, he was named to the Super League All-Star First Team.

=== Zamora Jaguars (2024–present) ===
In May 2024, Woods signed with Zamora Jaguars of the Liga Ecuatoriana de Baloncesto.

== Career statistics ==
Legend
GP	Games played	GS	Games started	MPG	Minutes per game
FG%	Field goal percentage	3P%	3-point field goal percentage	FT%	Free throw percentage
RPG	Rebounds per game	APG	Assists per game	SPG	Steals per game
BPG	Blocks per game	PPG	Points per game	**Bold**	Career high

*	Led NCAA Division I

=== College ===
Year	Team	GP	GS	MPG	FG%	3P%	FT%	RPG	APG	SPG	BPG	PPG
2016–17	North Carolina	**40***	0	7.7	.283	.182	.610	1.4	1.2	.5	**.1**	1.5
2017–18	North Carolina	20	0	7.0	.300	.000	**.800**	.7	1.0	.3	**.1**	1.1
2018–19	North Carolina	34	1	10.8	**.419**	**.400**	.643	1.0	**2.1**	.9	**.1**	2.5
2019–20	South Carolina	Redshirt										
2020–21	South Carolina	18	**13**	**19.0**	.368	.185	.667	**1.7**	1.9	**1.1**	**.1**	**5.4**
Career		112	14	10.3	.356	.212	.640	1.2	1.6	.7	.1	2.4
