= Luke Maye =

American basketball player (born 1997)

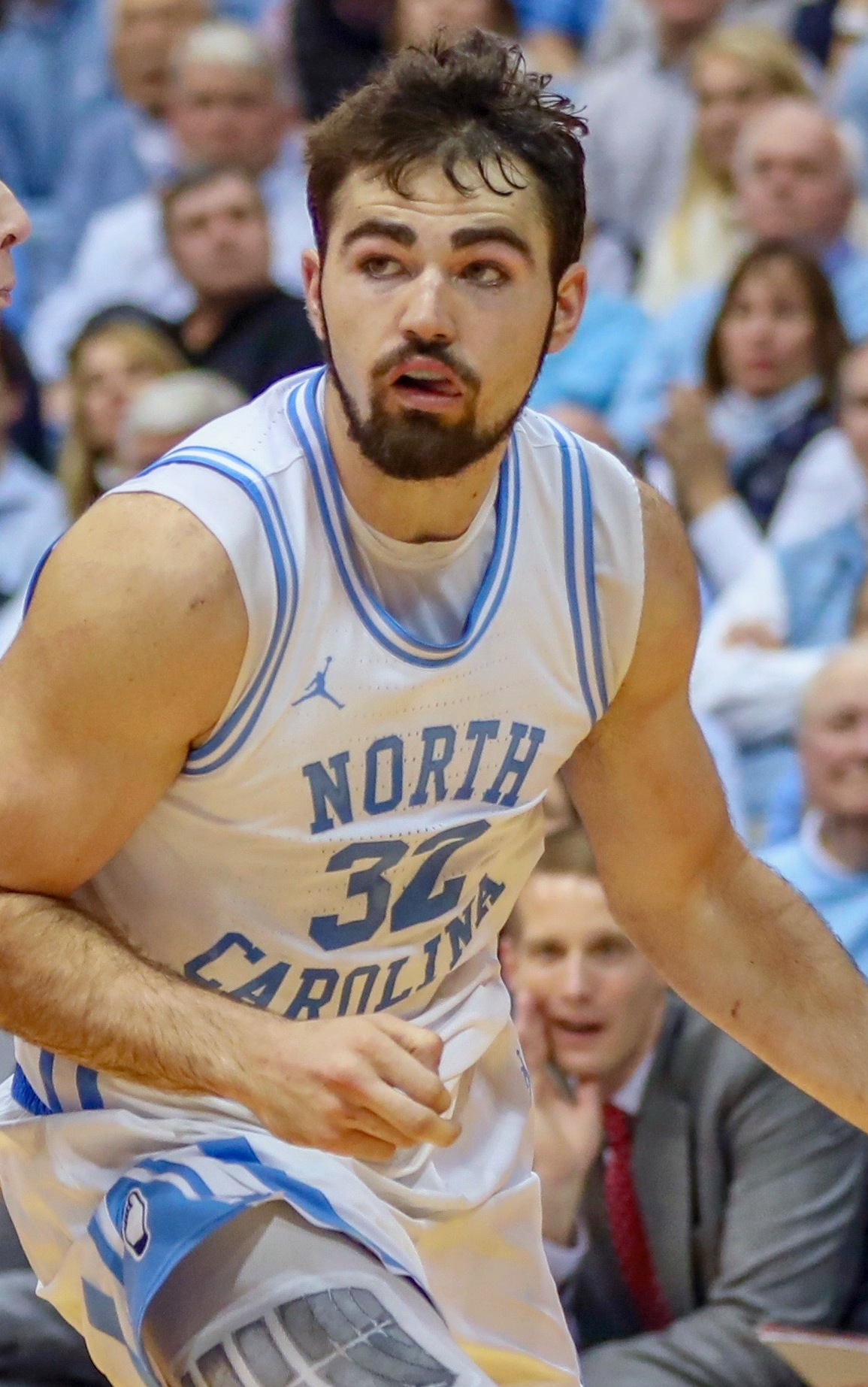
- Maye playing for North Carolina in 2019

No. 32 – Chiba Jets
- Position: Power forward
- League: B.League

Personal information
- Born: March 7, 1997 (age 29) Cary, North Carolina, U.S.
- Listed height: 6 ft 8 in (2.03 m)
- Listed weight: 240 lb (109 kg)

Career information
- High school: Hough (Cornelius, North Carolina)
- College: North Carolina (2015–2019)
- NBA draft: 2019: undrafted
- Playing career: 2019–present

Career history
- 2019–2020: Wisconsin Herd
- 2020–2021: Aquila Basket Trento
- 2021–2022: Bàsquet Manresa
- 2022–2023: Fundación CB Granada
- 2023–2024: Tofaş
- 2024: Ibaraki Robots
- 2024–2025: Nagoya Diamond Dolphins
- 2025–2026: Kobe Storks
- 2026–present: Chiba Jets

Career highlights
- NCAA champion (2017); Third-team All-American – AP, SN (2018); Senior CLASS Award (2019); First-team All-ACC (2018); Second-team All-ACC (2019); ACC Most Improved Player (2018); 2× Second-team Academic All-American (2018, 2019)
- Stats at Basketball Reference

Luke David Maye (born March 7, 1997) is an American professional basketball player for the Chiba Jets of the Japanese B.League. He played college basketball for the North Carolina Tar Heels, winning the 2017 national championship.

== Early life ==
Maye was born in Cary, North Carolina, the son of Amie and Mark Maye, a former quarterback for the University of North Carolina at Chapel Hill. Maye played high school basketball at William A. Hough High School in Cornelius, North Carolina where he made the Associated Press' All-State team twice. Maye also played baseball in all four years of high school.

== College career ==
=== Freshman season (2015–2016) ===
Maye committed to the University of North Carolina without knowing if he would receive a scholarship. Before he enrolled, he was informed by head coach Roy Williams that he would be on full scholarship. He was seldom used as a freshman.

=== Sophomore season (2016–2017) ===
In Maye's sophomore season, he recorded his first 10-point game coming off the bench against Davidson in December. Despite only having three 10-point games during the regular season, Maye had three more 10-point games during the NCAA Tournament. In the Elite Eight game against Kentucky, Maye hit the game-winning jump shot with 0.3 seconds left in the game, shortly after Malik Monk hit a three to tie the game at 73 with 7.2 seconds left. He also had a then career-high 17 points in this game. For his performance in the South Regional, he was named to the South Regional all-tournament team and won the regional's Most Outstanding Player award. In addition, a clip of him attending his 8:00 am class the following day would end up going viral. North Carolina went on to beat Oregon and Gonzaga to win the 2017 NCAA Men's Basketball National Championship. He finished the season averaging 5.5 points per game.

=== Junior season (2017–2018) ===
Maye had a breakout season as a junior in the 2017–18 season. In his first nine games, he averaged 20.8 points and 10.3 rebounds per game. This was the best start by a Tar Heel since Tyler Hansbrough's senior year in 2008–09. He ended up averaging 16.9 points per game and leading the team with 10.1 rebounds per game. On April 23, 2018, Maye declared for the NBA draft without hiring an agent. On May 24, Maye announced his intention to return to UNC for his senior season.

=== Senior season (2018–2019) ===
Coming into the season Maye was nominated for many preseason awards including preseason ACC player of the year. On February 5, Maye tallied 31 points and 12 rebounds in a 113–96 win against NC State. On February 21, Maye scored 30 points and 15 rebounds in a 88–72 victory over rival Duke. He averaged 14.9 points and 10.5 rebounds per game as a senior.

== Professional career ==
On June 21, 2019, the Milwaukee Bucks signed Maye to their Summer League team. On October 14, 2019, Maye was waived by the Bucks, but was assigned to the Bucks' NBA G League affiliate, the Wisconsin Herd. Maye was sidelined with an injury from December 16, 2019, to January 14, 2020. On March 7, Maye posted 25 points, nine rebounds, two assists, one block and one steal in a 136–122 win over the Capital City Go-Go.

Maye signed with Dolomiti Energia Trento of the Italian Lega Basket Serie A on July 18, 2020. On July 23, 2021, he signed a two-year deal with Baxi Manresa of the Liga ACB. On July 31, 2022, Maye signed with Covirán Granada of the Spanish LEB Oro. On July 12, 2023, he signed with Tofaş of Basketbol Süper Ligi (BSL).

== Career statistics ==
Legend
| GP | Games played | GS | Games started | MPG | Minutes per game |
| FG% | Field goal percentage | 3P% | 3-point field goal percentage | FT% | Free throw percentage |
| RPG | Rebounds per game | APG | Assists per game | SPG | Steals per game |
| BPG | Blocks per game | PPG | Points per game | **Bold** | Career high |

=== College ===
| Year | Team | GP | GS | MPG | FG% | 3P% | FT% | RPG | APG | SPG | BPG | PPG |
|---|---|---|---|---|---|---|---|---|---|---|---|---|
| 2015–16 | North Carolina | 33 | 0 | 5.4 | .390 | .286 | .429 | 1.7 | .2 | .1 | .1 | 1.2 |
| 2016–17 | North Carolina | 35 | 1 | 14.1 | .479 | .400 | .579 | 3.9 | 1.2 | .4 | .2 | 5.5 |
| 2017–18 | North Carolina | **37** | **37** | **32.2** | **.486** | **.431** | .624 | 10.1 | **2.4** | **1.0** | **1.0** | **16.9** |
| 2018–19 | North Carolina | 36 | 36 | 30.9 | .430 | .288 | **.774** | **10.4** | 2.3 | .6 | .6 | 14.9 |
| Career | | 141 | 74 | 21.1 | .460 | .361 | .675 | 6.7 | 1.6 | .5 | .5 | 9.9 |

== Professional career statistics ==
| Year | Team | League | GP | MPG | FG% | 3P% | FT% | RPG | APG | SPG | BPG | PPG |
|---|---|---|---|---|---|---|---|---|---|---|---|---|
| 2019–20 | Wisconsin Herd | NBA G-League | 34 | 23.1 | .426 | .354 | .921 | 7.4 | 1.8 | .6 | .5 | 10.7 |
| 2020–21 | Dolomiti Energia Trento | LBA | 41 | 25.2 | .419 | .348 | .805 | 6 | 1.2 | .5 | .4 | 11.6 |
| 2021–22 | Bàsquet Manresa | ACB | 51 | 17.3 | .407 | .341 | .789 | 3.8 | .6 | .4 | .3 | 8.9 |

== Personal life ==
Maye has three younger brothers, Cole (the next oldest), Beau, and Drake (the youngest). Cole won a national championship as a pitcher for the University of Florida, Drake played quarterback at UNC and was selected third overall by the New England Patriots in the 2024 NFL Draft, and Beau made Carolina's varsity basketball team as a walk-on. Maye grew up family friends with NFL quarterback Mason Rudolph, as their fathers played together at North Carolina.
