= Isaiah Hicks =

American basketball player (born 1994)

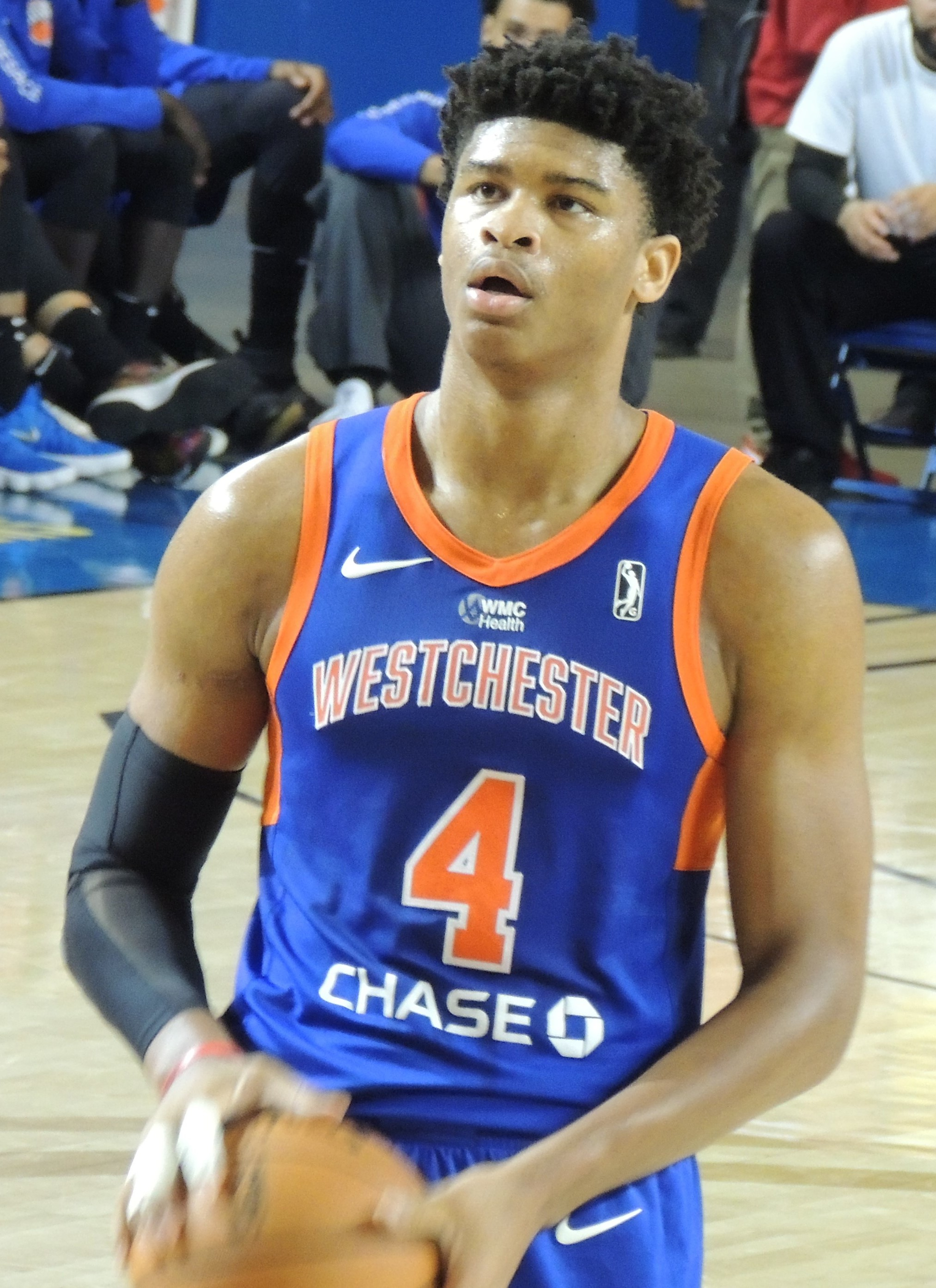
- Hicks with the Westchester Knicks in 2017

No. 31 – Leones de Ponce
- Position: Power forward / center
- League: Baloncesto Superior Nacional

Personal information
- Born: July 24, 1994 (age 32) Oxford, North Carolina, U.S.
- Listed height: 6 ft 9 in (2.06 m)
- Listed weight: 230 lb (104 kg)

Career information
- High school: J. F. Webb (Oxford, North Carolina)
- College: North Carolina (2013–2017)
- NBA draft: 2017: undrafted
- Playing career: 2017–present

Career history
- 2017–2019: New York Knicks
- 2017–2019: →Westchester Knicks
- 2019–2020: BC Avtodor
- 2020–2022: Seoul Samsung Thunders
- 2022–2023: San-en NeoPhoenix
- 2024–2025: Seoul SK Knights
- 2025–2026: Suwon KT Sonicboom
- 2026–present: Leones de Ponce

Career highlights
- NCAA champion (2017); ACC Sixth Man of the Year (2016); McDonald's All-American (2013); First-team Parade All-American (2013); North Carolina Mr. Basketball (2013)
- Stats at NBA.com
- Stats at Basketball Reference

Isaiah Dwayne Hicks (born July 24, 1994) is an American professional basketball player for the Leones de Ponce of the Baloncesto Superior Nacional (BSN). He played college basketball for the North Carolina Tar Heels.

== High school and college career ==
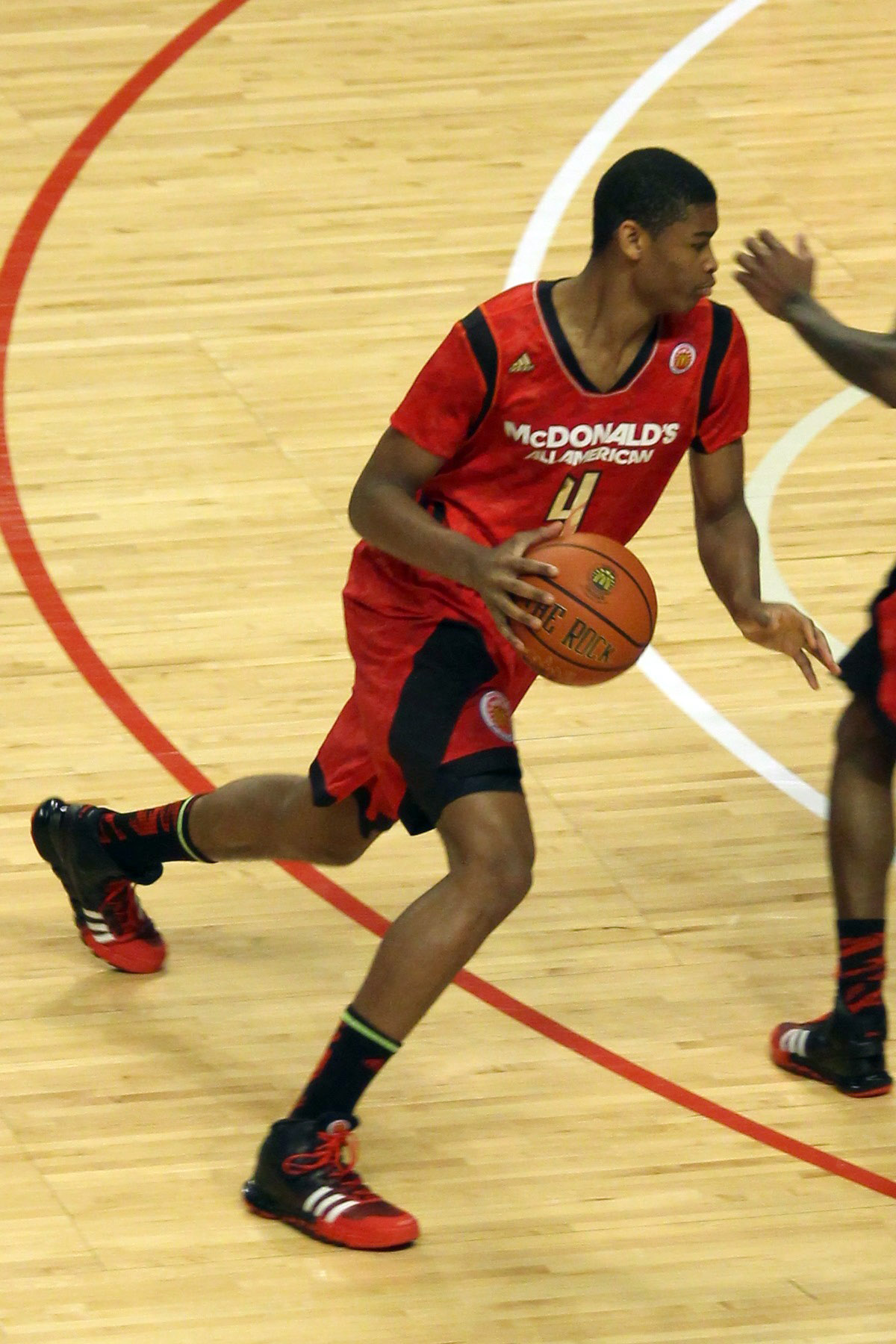
Hicks in the 2013 McDonald's All-American Boys Game

In his senior season at J. F. Webb High School, he was named to the 2013 McDonald's All-American Boys Game roster. He committed to North Carolina.

At the conclusion of his junior season, he received the ACC's Sixth Man of the Year Award. He scored 17 points in UNC's 103–64 win over Texas Southern in the first round of the NCAA tournament, but afterward averaged six points per game and did not score in double figures in UNC's last four games. Hicks scored 13 points and had 9 rebounds in the Tar Heels victory over Gonzaga in the 2017 National Championship game.

== Professional career ==
=== New York Knicks (2017–2019) ===
After going undrafted in the 2017 NBA draft, Hicks was signed by the Charlotte Hornets to their training camp roster. He was released on October 13, 2017, as one of the team's final preseason roster cuts.

On October 20, 2017, he signed a two-way contract with the New York Knicks via their NBA G League affiliate the Westchester Knicks. Hicks made his NBA debut on February 8, 2018, against the Toronto Raptors. Hicks would sign a second two-way contract with the Knicks on July 3.

On June 30, 2019, Hicks signed with the Hornets for the summer league.

=== International career (2019–present) ===
On August 3, 2019, Hicks signed with Russian team BC Avtodor of the VTB United League. He averaged 12.8 points and 6.7 rebounds per game in the VTB League.

On July 16, 2020, Hicks signed with the Seoul Samsung Thunders of the Korean Basketball League (KBL). On June 15, 2021, he re-signed with the Seoul Samsung Thunders.

On July 1, 2022, Hicks signed with the San-en NeoPhoenix of the B.League.

On July 21, 2023, Hicks signed with the Daegu KOGAS Pegasus of the Korean Basketball League. In October 2023, he was replaced by Andrew Nicholson after Achilles tendon rupture.

On June 20, 2024, Hicks signed with the Seoul SK Knights of the Korean Basketball League.

== Career statistics ==
Legend
GP	Games played	GS	Games started	MPG	Minutes per game
FG%	Field goal percentage	3P%	3-point field goal percentage	FT%	Free throw percentage
RPG	Rebounds per game	APG	Assists per game	SPG	Steals per game
BPG	Blocks per game	PPG	Points per game	**Bold**	Career high

=== NBA ===
==== Regular season ====
Year	Team	GP	GS	MPG	FG%	3P%	FT%	RPG	APG	SPG	BPG	PPG
2017–18	New York	**18**	0	**13.3**	.458	**.222**	.667	**2.3**	**.9**	.1	.2	**4.4**
2018–19	New York	3	0	10.7	**.500**	–	**.800**	**2.3**	.7	**.3**	**1.0**	4.0
Career		21	0	13.0	.463	.222	.696	2.3	.9	.1	.3	4.4

=== College ===
Year	Team	GP	GS	MPG	FG%	3P%	FT%	RPG	APG	SPG	BPG	PPG
2013–14	North Carolina	34	0	7.3	.417	**.200**	.579	1.0	.2	.1	.4	1.2
2014–15	North Carolina	38	3	14.8	.544	.000	.621	3.0	.3	.2	.4	6.6
2015–16	North Carolina	**40**	3	18.1	**.619**	–	.756	4.6	.7	**.5**	.6	9.2
2016–17	North Carolina	39	**39**	**23.3**	.576	–	**.779**	**5.5**	**1.4**	.4	**.7**	**11.8**
Career		151	45	16.2	.573	.167	.725	3.6	.7	.3	.5	7.4
