= Bryan Alberts =

American-Dutch basketball player (born 1994)

Personal information
- Born: December 29, 1994 (age 31) Northridge, California, U.S.
- Listed height: 196 cm (6 ft 5 in)
- Listed weight: 90 kg (198 lb)

Career information
- High school: Village Christian (Sun Valley, California)
- College: Gonzaga (2015–2017); Long Beach State (2017–2019)
- Playing career: 2019–2023
- Position: Point guard / shooting guard
- Number: 0

Career history
- 2019–2020: Djurgårdens IF
- 2021: Höttur
- 2021–2022: Kongsberg Miners
- 2023: Höttur

Bryan Anton Alberts (born December 29, 1994) is an American-Dutch professional basketball player. He played two seasons of college basketball with Long Beach State and three seasons in the Gonzaga University men's basketball program.

== College career ==
Alberts arrived at Gonzaga in 2014, redshirting his first season due to injury. In April 2017, Alberts reached the NCAA Division I Championship Game with Gonzaga.

Shortly after the end of that season, Alberts announced that he planned to transfer from Gonzaga. At the time, he was expecting to earn his bachelor's degree in economics in August 2017 (and ultimately did so), making him immediately eligible to play for another NCAA Division I school under the NCAA's graduate transfer rule. Unlike most players who have taken advantage of the rule, he was eligible for two more seasons. On August 12, 2017, Alberts announced he would attend Long Beach State, where was coached by Dan Monson, who coincidentally preceded Mark Few as Gonzaga's head coach. He averaged 11.3 points per game as a junior. As a senior, Alberts averaged 10.5 points per game.

== Professional career ==
In August 2019, Alberts signed with Djurgårdens IF Basket in Sweden. In February 2021, Alberts signed with Úrvalsdeild karla club Höttur.

In October 2021, Alberts signed with the Kongsberg Miners of the Norwegian BLNO, where he replaced Jahmal McMurray. In January 2023, Alberts returned to Iceland and signed with Höttur.

== Dutch national team ==
In 2015, Alberts made his debut for the Netherlands national B team. He made his debut for the Dutch national A team on August 5, 2016, in a game against Poland.
