= 2016–17 Gonzaga Bulldogs men's basketball team =

American college basketball season

2016–17 Gonzaga Bulldogs men's basketball

NCAA tournament, Runner-up WCC regular season and tournament champions AdvoCare Invitational champions

National Championship Game, L 65–71 vs. North Carolina
- Conference: West Coast Conference

Ranking
- Coaches: No. 2
- AP: No. 2
- Record: 37–2 (17–1 WCC)
- Head coach: Mark Few (18th season)
- Assistant coaches: Tommy Lloyd (16th season); Donny Daniels (7th season); Brian Michaelson (4th season)
- Home arena: McCarthey Athletic Center

2016–17 West Coast Conference men's basketball standings
	Conf.				Overall
Team	W		L	PCT	W		L	PCT
No. 2 Gonzaga †	17	–	1	.944	37	–	2	.949
No. 22 Saint Mary's	16	–	2	.889	29	–	5	.853
BYU	12	–	6	.667	22	–	12	.647
San Francisco	10	–	8	.556	20	–	13	.606
Santa Clara	10	–	8	.556	17	–	16	.515
Loyola Marymount	8	–	10	.444	15	–	15	.500
San Diego	6	–	12	.333	13	–	18	.419
Pepperdine	5	–	13	.278	9	–	22	.290
Pacific	4	–	14	.222	11	–	22	.333
Portland	2	–	16	.111	11	–	22	.333
† Conference tournament winner Rankings from AP poll

The 2016–17 Gonzaga Bulldogs men's basketball team represented Gonzaga University in the 2016–17 NCAA Division I men's basketball season. The team was led by head coach Mark Few, who was in his 18th season as head coach. The team played its home games at McCarthey Athletic Center in Spokane, Washington. The Bulldogs (also informally referred to as the Zags) played in their 37th season as a member of the West Coast Conference.

The 2016–17 season was arguably the greatest season in Gonzaga's 109-year basketball history. The Bulldogs finished the regular season with a 32–1 record, only blemished by a loss to BYU on February 25. They finished ranked second in the AP Poll, the highest final national ranking in school history prior to the 2020–21 season. They won both the West Coast Conference regular season and tournament championships, and advanced to the first NCAA National Championship game in the school's history—the deepest NCAA Tournament run for a WCC team since San Francisco advanced to its third consecutive Final Four in 1957. With a victory over South Carolina in the regional semifinal, the Bulldogs tied the NCAA Division I record for the second-most wins in a season. They lost in the NCAA National Championship game to North Carolina.

== Previous season ==
The Bulldogs team finished the 2015–16 season 28–8, 15–3 in WCC play to earn a share for the WCC regular season championship. They defeated Portland, BYU, and Saint Mary's to win the WCC tournament and earn the conference's automatic bid to the NCAA tournament; the Bulldogs have sequentially earned a place in this tournament for the past 18 years. As a No. 11 seed, they defeated No. 6 seed Seton Hall and No. 3 seed Utah to advance to the Sweet Sixteen. There they lost to No. 10 seed and eventual Final Four participant Syracuse.

== Preseason ==
The Bulldogs were picked to finish first in the WCC preseason poll. Przemek Karnowski and Josh Perkins were selected to the All-WCC preseason team.

The Bulldogs were ranked No. 14 in the preseason AP poll and No. 13 in the preseason Coaches Poll.

== Offseason ==
=== Coaching changes ===
==== Departures ====
Name	Position	Year at Gonzaga	Alma Mater (year)	Reason for departure
Jennifer Nyland	Athletic Trainer	17th	Washington State (1998)	Left team
Mike Hart	Video Coordinator	2nd	Gonzaga (2012)	Assistant coach at Colorado College
Doug Wojcik	Special Assistant to the Head Coach	1st	Navy (1987)	Left team

==== Additions to staff ====
Name	Position	Year at Gonzaga	Alma Mater (year)	Previous Job
Ken Bone	Special Assistant to the Head Coach	1st	Seattle Pacific (1982)	Associate Head Coach at Montana
Ken Nakagawa	Graduate Assistant	1st	Long Beach State (2014)	Graduate Assistant at Long Beach State
Josh Therrien	Athletic Trainer	1st	Washington State (2007)	Assistant Athletic Trainer at Oregon State baseball

=== Player departures ===
Name	Number	Pos.	Height	Weight	Year	Hometown	Reason for departure
Eric McClellan	23	G	6'4"	184	Senior (Redshirt)	Austin, TX	Graduated
Kyle Wiltjer	33	F	6'10"	243	Senior (Redshirt)	Portland, OR	Graduated
Kyle Dranginis	3	G	6'5"	203	Senior (Redshirt)	Nampa, ID	Graduated
Domantas Sabonis	11	F	6'11"	240	Sophomore	Kaunas, Lithuania	Entered the 2016 NBA draft

=== Incoming transfers ===
Name	Pos.	Height	Weight	Year	Hometown	Previous School	Years Remaining	Date Eligible
Jordan Mathews	G	6'4"	203	Senior	San Francisco, CA	California	1	Oct. 1, 2016

=== 2016 recruiting class ===
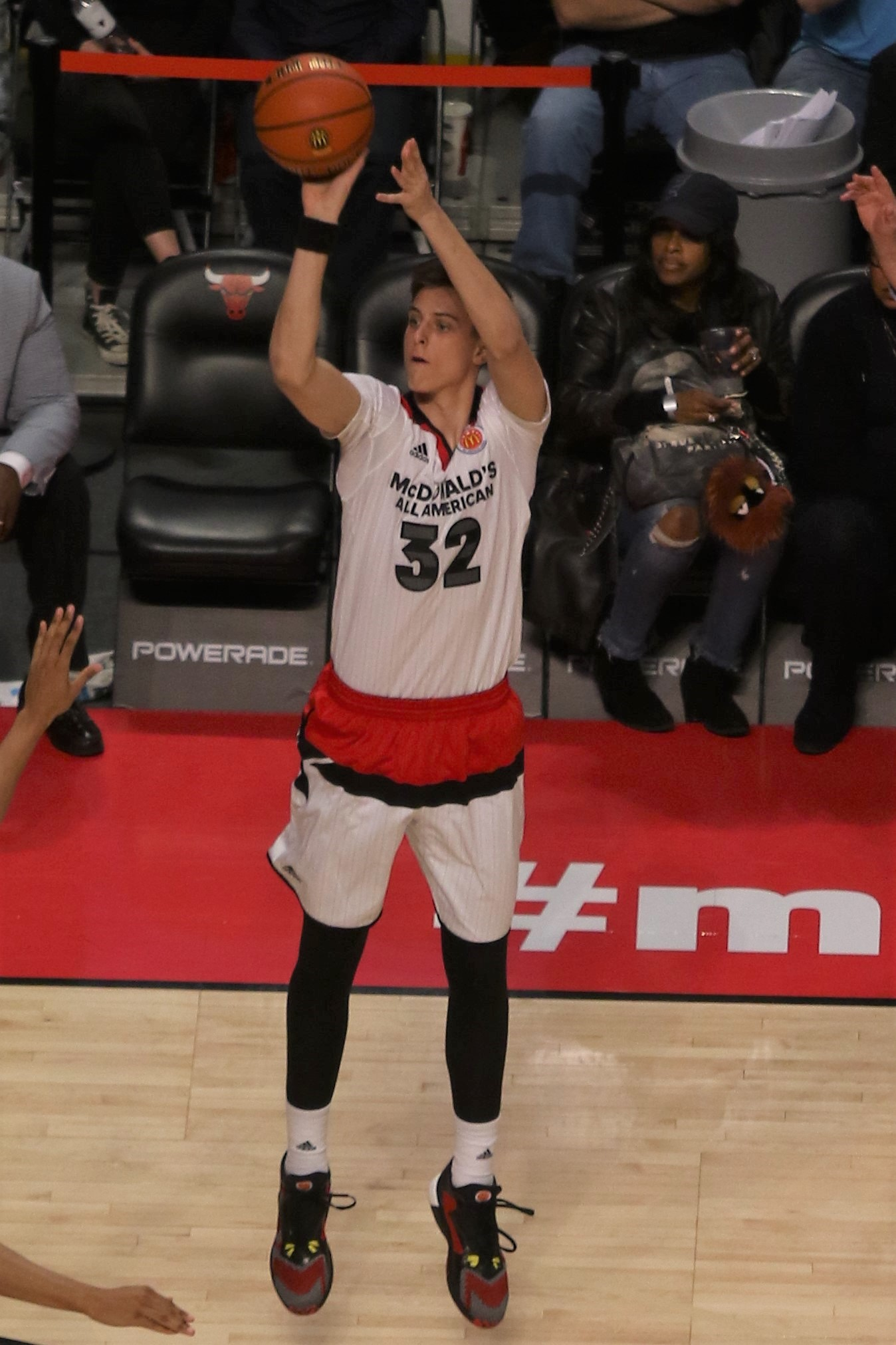
Zach Collins at the 2016 McDonald's All-American Game

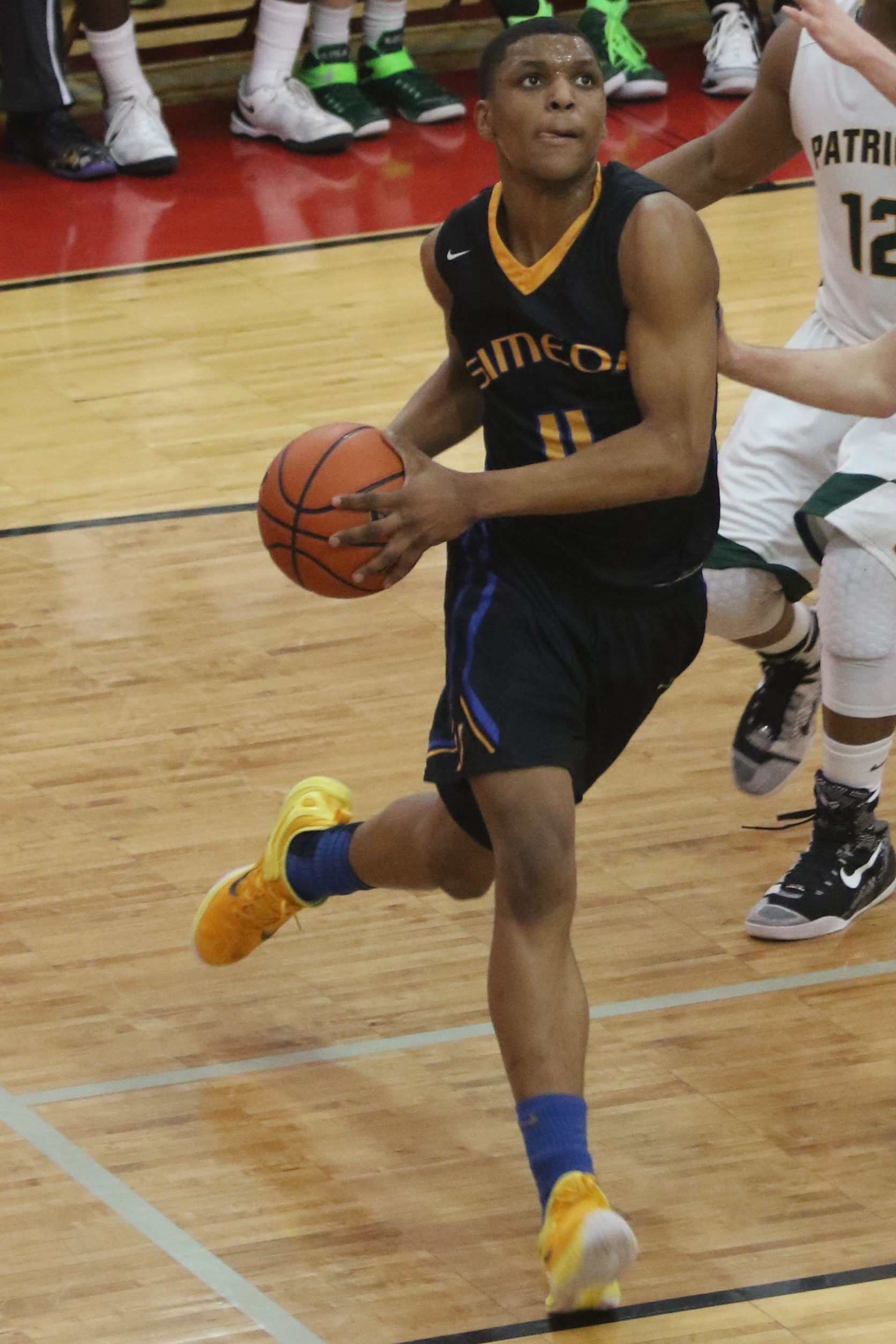
Zach Norvell for Simeon Career Academy in 2015

College recruiting
Name	Hometown	School	Height	Weight	Commit date
Zach Collins; C	Las Vegas, NV	Bishop Gorman	7 ft 0 in (2.13 m)	230 lb (100 kg)	Mar 16, 2015
Zach Collins; C	Recruit ratings: Scout: Rivals: 247Sports: ESPN: (88)				
Killian Tillie; F	Cagnes-sur-Mer, France	INSEP	6 ft 10 in (2.08 m)	230 lb (100 kg)	Aug 29, 2015
Killian Tillie; F	Recruit ratings: Scout: Rivals: 247Sports: ESPN: (NR)				
Zach Norvell; G	Chicago, IL	Simeon	6 ft 6 in (1.98 m)	185 lb (84 kg)	Nov 2, 2015
Zach Norvell; G	Recruit ratings: Scout: Rivals: 247Sports: ESPN: (82)				
Jacob Larsen; C	Holte, Denmark	Falkonergårdens Gymnasium; SISU Copenhagen	6 ft 10 in (2.08 m)	235 lb (107 kg)	Nov 12, 2015
Jacob Larsen; C	Recruit ratings: Scout: Rivals: 247Sports: ESPN: (NR)				
Rui Hachimura; F	Sendai, Japan	Meisei	6 ft 8 in (2.03 m)	210 lb (95 kg)	Nov 20, 2015
Rui Hachimura; F	Recruit ratings: Scout: Rivals: 247Sports: ESPN: (NR)				
Overall recruit ranking: Scout: #14 Rivals: #13 247Sports: #10 ESPN: #21
Note: In many cases, Scout, Rivals, 247Sports, On3, and ESPN may conflict in their listings of height and weight.; In these cases, the average was taken. ESPN grades are on a 100-point scale.; Sources: "2016 Gonzaga Rivals Commits". Rivals. Archived from the original on June 25, 2016.; "2016 Gonzaga Scout Commits". Scout. Archived from the original on June 25, 2016.; "2016 Gonzaga ESPN Commits". ESPN. Archived from the original on June 25, 2016.; "Scout.com Team Recruiting Rankings". Scout.; "2016 Team Ranking". Rivals.; "2016 Gonzaga 24/7 Sports Commits". 247Sports. Archived from the original on June 25, 2016.

=== 2017 recruiting class ===
College recruiting (2017)
Name	Hometown	School	Height	Weight	Commit date
Corey Kispert; SF	Seattle, WA	King's	6 ft 6 in (1.98 m)	215 lb (98 kg)	May 4, 2016
Corey Kispert; SF	Recruit ratings: Scout: Rivals: 247Sports: ESPN: (82)				
Overall recruit ranking:
Note: In many cases, Scout, Rivals, 247Sports, On3, and ESPN may conflict in their listings of height and weight.; In these cases, the average was taken. ESPN grades are on a 100-point scale.; Sources: "2017 Gonzaga Rivals Commits". Rivals.; "2017 Gonzaga Scout Commits". Scout.; "2017 Gonzaga ESPN Commits". ESPN.; "Scout.com Team Recruiting Rankings". Scout.; "2017 Team Ranking". Rivals.; "2017 Gonzaga 24/7 Sports Commits". 247Sports.

== Roster ==
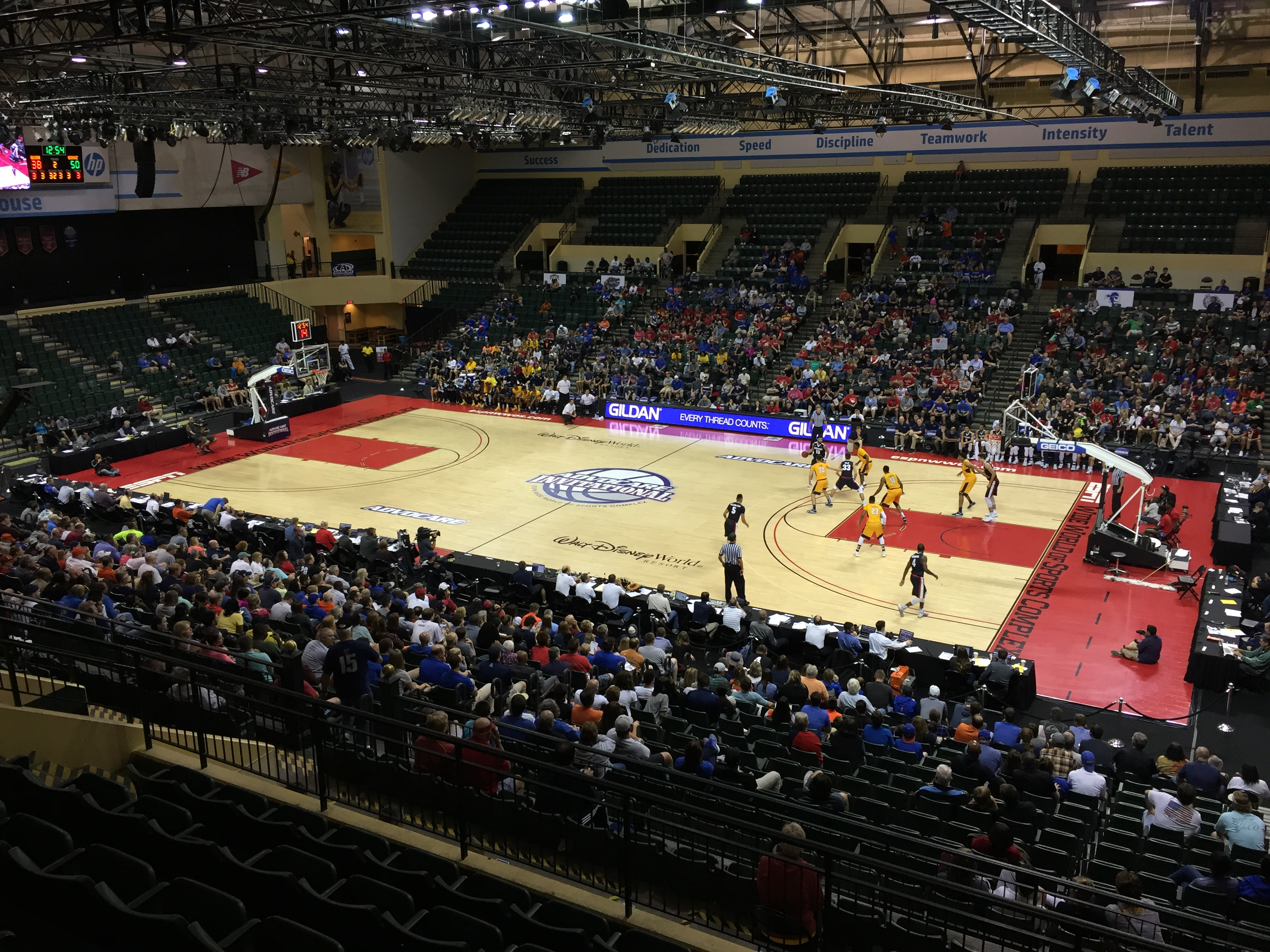
The Gonzaga Bulldogs and the Quinnipiac Bobcats play in the Quarterfinals at the 2016 AdvoCare Invitational.

2016–17 Gonzaga Bulldogs men's basketball team
Players
Coaches

Pos.	#	Name	Height	Weight	Year	Previous school	Hometown
C	24	Przemek Karnowski	7 ft 1 in (2.16 m)	286 lb (130 kg)	RS Sr	Nicolaus Copernicus; Siarka Jezioro Tarnobrzeg	Toruń, Poland
G	15	Rem Bakamus (W)	6 ft 0 in (1.83 m)	173 lb (78 kg)	RS Sr	Mark Morris HS	Longview, WA
G	4	Jordan Mathews	6 ft 4 in (1.93 m)	203 lb (92 kg)	Sr	Santa Monica; California	Los Angeles, CA
G	5	Nigel Williams-Goss	6 ft 3 in (1.91 m)	195 lb (88 kg)	RS Jr	Findlay Prep; Washington	Happy Valley, OR
F	3	Johnathan Williams	6 ft 9 in (2.06 m)	228 lb (103 kg)	RS Jr	Southwind; Missouri	Memphis, TN
C	25	Ryan Edwards	7 ft 1 in (2.16 m)	295 lb (134 kg)	RS Jr	Glacier HS	Kalispell, MT
G	55	Dustin Triano (W)	6 ft 3 in (1.91 m)	180 lb (82 kg)	RS Jr	New Hampton School	Vancouver, BC
G	0	Silas Melson	6 ft 4 in (1.93 m)	195 lb (88 kg)	Jr	Jefferson HS	Portland, OR
F	22	Jeremy Jones (W)	6 ft 6 in (1.98 m)	210 lb (95 kg)	RS So	East Central; Rice	San Antonio, TX
G	13	Josh Perkins	6 ft 3 in (1.91 m)	190 lb (86 kg)	RS So	Huntington Prep	Park Hill, CO
G	10	Bryan Alberts	6 ft 5 in (1.96 m)	198 lb (90 kg)	RS So	Village Christian	Northridge, CA
G	2	Jack Beach (W) (redshirt)	6 ft 2 in (1.88 m)	175 lb (79 kg)	So	Torrey Pines HS	San Diego, CA
F	32	Zach Collins	7 ft 0 in (2.13 m)	230 lb (104 kg)	Fr	Bishop Gorman HS	Las Vegas, NV
F	33	Killian Tillie	6 ft 10 in (2.08 m)	200 lb (91 kg)	Fr	INSEP	Cagnes-sur-Mer, France
F	21	Rui Hachimura	6 ft 8 in (2.03 m)	225 lb (102 kg)	Fr	Meisei	Sendai, Japan
G	23	Zach Norvell (injured) (redshirt)	6 ft 5 in (1.96 m)	205 lb (93 kg)	Fr	Simeon	Chicago, IL
C	14	Jacob Larsen (injured) (redshirt)	6 ft 11 in (2.11 m)	227 lb (103 kg)	Fr	Falkonergårdens Gymnasium; SISU Copenhagen	Holte, Denmark

Head coach

- Mark Few (Oregon)

Assistant coach(es)

- Tommy Lloyd (Whitman)
- Donny Daniels (Cal State Fullerton)
- Brian Michaelson (Gonzaga)

Legend

- (C) Team captain
- (S) Suspended
- (I) Ineligible
- (W) Walk-on
- Injured
- Current redshirt

Roster
Last update: February 7, 2017

- Roster is subject to change as/if players transfer or leave the program for other reasons.
- Przemek Karnowski received a medical hardship waiver and decided to play his final season of eligibility at Gonzaga in 2016–17. He played the first five games for the Zags in 2015–16, but due to back problems, which eventually forced him to undergo surgery, he missed the rest of the season.
- Jesse Wade graduated high school in 2015, but before enrolling in college at Gonzaga, he left for a 2-year LDS mission in Lyon, France, and will arrive on campus as a freshman in Fall 2017.
- Jacob Larsen suffered a season-ending knee injury in a preseason practice, forcing him to redshirt the 2016–17 season. Larsen will have 4 years of eligibility remaining at the start of the 2017–18 season.
- Jack Beach did not suit up for Gonzaga's season opener against Utah Valley and decided to redshirt the 2016–17 season. Beach will have 3 years of eligibility remaining at the start of the 2017–18 season.
- Zach Norvell decided to redshirt the 2016–17 season to recover from summer knee surgery on his meniscus. Norvell will have 4 years of eligibility remaining at the start of the 2017–18 season.

=== Coaching staff ===
Name	Position	Year at Gonzaga	Alma Mater (year)
Mark Few	Head coach	18th	Oregon (1987)
Tommy Lloyd	Associate Head Coach	16th	Whitman (1998)
Donny Daniels	Assistant coach	7th	Cal State Fullerton (1976)
Brian Michaelson	Assistant coach	4th	Gonzaga (2005)
Ken Bone	Special Assistant to the Head Coach	1st	Seattle Pacific (1982)
Ken Nakagawa	Graduate Assistant	1st	Long Beach State (2014)
John Jakus	Director of Basketball Operations	3rd	Trinity International (1999)
Riccardo Fois	Director of Analytics	3rd	Pepperdine (2009)
Josh Therrien	Athletic Trainer	1st	Washington State (2007)
Travis Knight	Strength & Conditioning Coach	11th	Gonzaga (2000)

== Schedule and results ==
Gonzaga's non-conference schedule included a matchup with Washington as well as neutral court games against Tennessee (in Nashville) and Arizona (in Los Angeles). The Zags were invited to play in the AdvoCare Invitational in Florida, where they ultimately played against Quinnipiac, Florida, and Iowa State. Gonzaga played 18 conference games (home-and-home) within a nine-week span, beginning on December 29, 2016. The Zags also played in and won the single-elimination WCC Tournament, which took place March 2–7, 2017 at Orleans Arena in Las Vegas. This year's tournament was the first under a new 3-year contract with that venue.

Date time, TV	Rank^{#}	Opponent^{#}	Result	Record	High points	High rebounds	High assists	Site (attendance) city, state
Exhibition
Oct. 29*	No. 14	Baylor; Secret Scrimmage	T	–	–	–	–	- Oklahoma City, OK
Nov. 5*; 6:00 PM, KHQ	No. 14	West Georgia; Exhibition Game	W 122–76	–	20 – Williams-Goss	14 – Williams	5 – Williams-Goss	McCarthey Athletic Center (6,000); Spokane, WA
Non-conference regular season
Nov. 11*; 6:00 PM, RTNW/KHQ	No. 14	Utah Valley	W 92–69	1–0	17 – Melson	9 – Tillie	6 – Williams-Goss	McCarthey Athletic Center (6,000); Spokane, WA
Nov. 14*; 9:00 PM, ESPN2	No. 14	San Diego State; College Hoops Tip-Off Marathon	W 69–48	2–0	17 – Mathews	10 – Tillie	3 – Williams-Goss	McCarthey Athletic Center (6,000); Spokane, WA
Nov. 18*; 5:30 PM, KHQ/RTNW	No. 14	Bryant	W 109–70	3–0	22 – Karnowski	8 – Tied	5 – Williams-Goss	McCarthey Athletic Center (6,000); Spokane, WA
Nov. 24*; 3:30 PM, ESPN2	No. 11	vs. Quinnipiac; AdvoCare Invitational Quarterfinals	W 82–62	4–0	13 – Tied	8 – Karnowski	8 – Williams-Goss	HP Field House (1,949); Bay Lake, FL
Nov. 25*; 6:30 PM, ESPNU	No. 11	vs. Florida; AdvoCare Invitational Semifinals	W 77–72	5–0	18 – Perkins	6 – Tillie	3 – 3 Tied	HP Field House (2,941); Bay Lake, FL
Nov. 27*; 10:30 AM, ESPN	No. 11	vs. No. 21 Iowa State; AdvoCare Invitational Championship	W 73–71	6–0	18 – Williams-Goss	8 – Karnowski	5 – Tied	HP Field House (2,305); Bay Lake, FL
Dec. 1*; 6:00 PM, KHQ/RTNW	No. 8	Mississippi Valley State	W 97–63	7–0	15 – Tied	9 – Tied	5 – Williams-Goss	McCarthey Athletic Center (6,000); Spokane, WA
Dec. 3*; 2:30 PM, ESPN	No. 8	vs. No. 16 Arizona; HoopHall LA	W 69–62	8–0	18 – Karnowski	8 – Collins	3 – Williams-Goss	Staples Center; Los Angeles, CA
Dec. 7*; 8:00 PM, ESPN2	No. 8	Washington; Rivalry	W 98–71	9–0	23 – Williams-Goss	8 – Karnowski	5 – Tied	McCarthey Athletic Center (6,000); Spokane, WA
Dec. 10*; 5:00 PM, RTNW/KHQ	No. 8	Akron	W 61–43	10–0	14 – Karnowski	8 – Karnowski	5 – Williams-Goss	McCarthey Athletic Center (6,000); Spokane, WA
Dec. 18*; 1:00 M, ESPN2	No. 8	vs. Tennessee; Nashville Showcase	W 86–76	11–0	20 – Williams-Goss	9 – Tied	8 – Williams-Goss	Bridgestone Arena (13,784); Nashville, TN
Dec. 21*; 6:00 PM, RTNW/KHQ	No. 7	South Dakota	W 102–65	12–0	21 – Collins	9 – Williams-Goss	5 – Tied	McCarthey Athletic Center (6,000); Spokane, WA
WCC regular season
Dec. 29; 6:00 PM, RTNW/KHQ	No. 7	Pepperdine	W 92–62	13–0 (1–0)	16 – Tied	7 – Tied	8 – Perkins	McCarthey Athletic Center (6,000); Spokane, WA
Dec. 31; 5:00 PM, RTNW/KHQ	No. 7	at Pacific	W 81–61	14–0 (2–0)	19 – Karnowski	6 – Tied	7 – Karnowski	Alex G. Spanos Center (2,859); Stockton, CA
Jan. 5; 6:00 PM, ESPN2	No. 5	at San Francisco	W 95–80	15–0 (3–0)	36 – Williams-Goss	11 – Williams-Goss	6 – Tied	War Memorial Gymnasium (3,814); San Francisco, CA
Jan. 12; 6:00 PM, RTNW/KHQ	No. 5	Loyola Marymount	W 93–55	16–0 (4–0)	17 – Karnowski	9 – Collins	5 – Tied	McCarthey Athletic Center (6,000); Spokane, WA
Jan. 14; 7:00 PM, ESPN2	No. 5	No. 21 Saint Mary's; Rivalry	W 79–56	17–0 (5–0)	19 – Williams-Goss	6 – Karnowski	6 – Williams-Goss	McCarthey Athletic Center (6,000); Spokane, WA
Jan. 19; 8:00 PM, ESPNU	No. 4	at Santa Clara	W 88–57	18–0 (6–0)	19 – Karnowski	10 – Williams-Goss	4 – Perkins	Leavey Center (4,738); Santa Clara, CA
Jan. 21; 5:00 PM, RTNW/KHQ	No. 4	Portland	W 73–52	19–0 (7–0)	15 – Williams-Goss	9 – Collins	6 – Perkins	McCarthey Athletic Center (6,000); Spokane, WA
Jan. 23; 5:00 PM, RTNW/KHQ	No. 3	at Portland	W 83–64	20–0 (8–0)	13 – Collins	7 – Williams	5 – Karnowski	Chiles Center (4,852); Portland, OR
Jan. 26; 6:00 PM, RTNW/KHQ	No. 3	San Diego	W 79–43	21–0 (9–0)	25 – Williams-Goss	12 – Williams	5 – Tied	McCarthey Athletic Center (6,000); Spokane, WA
Jan. 28; 7:00 PM, ESPN2	No. 3	at Pepperdine	W 96–49	22–0 (10–0)	16 – Karnowski	7 – Williams	8 – Williams-Goss	Firestone Fieldhouse (3,104); Malibu, CA
Feb. 2; 8:00 PM, ESPN2	No. 1	at BYU; Rivalry	W 85–75	23–0 (11–0)	33 – Williams-Goss	8 – 3 Tied	4 – 3 Tied	Marriott Center (18,987); Provo, UT
Feb. 4; 7:00 PM, ESPN2	No. 1	Santa Clara	W 90–55	24–0 (12–0)	16 – Mathews	8 – Collins	8 – Perkins	McCarthey Athletic Center (6,000); Spokane, WA
Feb. 9; 7:00 PM, RTNW/KHQ	No. 1	at Loyola Marymount	W 90–60	25–0 (13–0)	19 – Williams-Goss	11 – Williams-Goss	3 – Perkins	Gersten Pavilion (4,156); Los Angeles, CA
Feb. 11; 5:15 PM, ESPN	No. 1	at No. 20 Saint Mary's; College GameDay/Rivalry	W 74–64	26–0 (14–0)	19 – Karnowski	9 – Tied	3 – Williams-Goss	McKeon Pavilion (3,500); Moraga, CA
Feb. 16; 6:00 PM, RTNW/KHQ	No. 1	San Francisco	W 96–61	27–0 (15–0)	30 – Williams-Goss	11 – Williams	7 – Williams-Goss	McCarthey Athletic Center (6,000); Spokane, WA
Feb. 18; 1:00 PM, RTNW/KHQ	No. 1	Pacific	W 82–61	28–0 (16–0)	18 – Williams-Goss	11 – Williams	7 – Williams-Goss	McCarthey Athletic Center (6,000); Spokane, WA
Feb. 23; 7:00 PM, RTNW/KHQ	No. 1	at San Diego	W 96–38	29–0 (17–0)	15 – Tied	19 – Williams	6 – Perkins	Jenny Craig Pavilion (5,100); San Diego, CA
Feb. 25; 7:00 PM, ESPN	No. 1	BYU; Rivalry	L 71–79	29–1 (17–1)	19 – Williams-Goss	12 – Williams	3 – Williams-Goss	McCarthey Athletic Center (6,000); Spokane, WA
WCC Tournament
Mar. 4; 7:00 PM, ESPN2	(1) No. 4	vs. (9) Pacific; Quarterfinals	W 82–50	30–1	22 – Mathews	9 – Karnowski	4 – Williams-Goss	Orleans Arena (7,315); Paradise, NV
Mar. 6; 6:00 PM, ESPN	(1) No. 4	vs. (4) Santa Clara; Semifinals	W 77–68	31–1	25 – Williams-Goss	8 – Williams-Goss	5 – Williams-Goss	Orleans Arena (8,712); Paradise, NV
Mar. 7; 6:00 PM, ESPN	(1) No. 4	vs. (2) No. 19 Saint Mary's; Championship/Rivalry	W 74–56	32–1	22 – Williams-Goss	10 – Karnowski	6 – Williams-Goss	Orleans Arena (8,179); Paradise, NV
NCAA tournament
Mar. 16*; 11:00 AM, TBS	(1 W) No. 2	vs. (16 W) South Dakota State; First Round	W 66–46	33–1	16 – Mathews	14 – Williams	4 – Williams-Goss	Vivint Smart Home Arena (16,952); Salt Lake City, UT
Mar. 18*; 2:15 PM, CBS	(1 W) No. 2	vs. (8 W) Northwestern; Second Round	W 79–73	34–1	20 – Williams-Goss	8 – Williams-Goss	4 – Williams-Goss	Vivint Smart Home Arena (18,565); Salt Lake City, UT
Mar. 23*; 4:39 PM, TBS	(1 W) No. 2	vs. (4 W) No. 13 West Virginia; Sweet Sixteen	W 61–58	35–1	13 – 3 Tied	7 – Williams-Goss	2 – Tied	SAP Center (16,884); San Jose, CA
Mar. 25*; 3:09 PM, TBS	(1 W) No. 2	vs. (11 W) Xavier; Elite Eight	W 83–59	36–1	23 – Williams-Goss	8 – Tied	4 – Williams-Goss	SAP Center (17,011); San Jose, CA
Apr. 1*; 3:09 PM, CBS	(1 W) No. 2	vs. (7 E) South Carolina; Final Four	W 77–73	37–1	23 – Williams-Goss	13 – Collins	6 – Williams-Goss	University of Phoenix Stadium (77,612); Glendale, AZ
Apr. 3*; 6:20 PM, CBS	(1 W) No. 2	vs. (1 S) No. 5 North Carolina; National Championship	L 65–71	37–2	15 – Williams-Goss	9 – Tied	6 – Williams-Goss	University of Phoenix Stadium (76,168); Glendale, AZ
*Non-conference game. ^{#}Rankings from AP Poll. (#) Tournament seedings in parentheses. W=West Region, E=East Region, S=South Region. All times are in Pacific Time.

== Rankings ==
Ranking movements Legend: ██ Increase in ranking ██ Decrease in ranking ( ) = First-place votes
	Week																			
Poll	Pre	1	2	3	4	5	6	7	8	9	10	11	12	13	14	15	16	17	18	Final
AP	14	11	11	8	8	8	7	7	5	5	4 (2)	3 (2)	1 (46)	1 (59)	1 (60)	1 (59)	4 (2)	4 (1)	2 (6)	Not released
Coaches	13	14	11	8	8	8	7	6	4	5	4 (3)	3 (3)	1 (24)	1 (28)	1 (29)	1 (29)	4 (1)	4 (1)	2 (1)	2

*AP does not release post-NCAA tournament rankings
