= 2016–17 North Carolina Tar Heels men's basketball team =

American college basketball season

2016–17 North Carolina Tar Heels men's basketball

NCAA tournament National Champions ACC regular season champions Maui Invitational champions

National Championship Game, W 71–65 vs. Gonzaga
- Conference: Atlantic Coast Conference

Ranking
- Coaches: No. 1
- AP: No. 5
- Record: 33–7 (14–4 ACC)
- Head coach: Roy Williams (14th season)
- Assistant coaches: Steve Robinson (14th season); C. B. McGrath (14th season); Hubert Davis (5th season)
- Home arena: Dean E. Smith Center

2016–17 ACC men's basketball standings
	Conf.				Overall
Team	W		L	PCT	W		L	PCT
No. 5 North Carolina	14	–	4	.778	33	–	7	.825
No. 16 Florida State	12	–	6	.667	26	–	9	.743
No. 14 Notre Dame	12	–	6	.667	26	–	10	.722
No. 10 Louisville	12	–	6	.667	25	–	9	.735
No. 7 Duke †	11	–	7	.611	28	–	9	.757
No. 24 Virginia	11	–	7	.611	23	–	11	.676
Virginia Tech	10	–	8	.556	22	–	11	.667
Miami (FL)	10	–	8	.556	21	–	12	.636
Syracuse	10	–	8	.556	19	–	15	.559
Wake Forest	9	–	9	.500	19	–	14	.576
Georgia Tech	8	–	10	.444	21	–	16	.568
Clemson	6	–	12	.333	17	–	16	.515
NC State	0	–	14	.000	0	–	17	.000[3]
Pittsburgh	4	–	14	.222	16	–	17	.485
Boston College	2	–	16	.111	9	–	23	.281
† 2017 ACC tournament winner Rankings from AP poll

The 2016–17 North Carolina Tar Heels men's basketball team represented the University of North Carolina at Chapel Hill during the 2016–17 NCAA Division I men's basketball season. It was head coach Roy Williams' 14th season. The Tar Heels played their home games at the Dean Smith Center as members of the Atlantic Coast Conference. In 2017, they earned their 6th NCAA National Championship by defeating Gonzaga in the championship game.

== Previous season ==
The Tar Heels finished the 2015–16 season with a record of 33–7, 14–4 in ACC play to finish in first place, winning their 30th ACC regular season title. The Tar Heels also won their 18th ACC tournament championship by beating Virginia in the finals 61–57. They received the conference's automatic bid to the NCAA tournament as a No. 1 seed. There, they defeated Florida Gulf Coast, Providence, Indiana, and Notre Dame to earn a trip to the Final Four, the school's 19th Final Four. In a matchup against fellow ACC foe, Syracuse, the Tar Heels easily won 83–66 to advance to the National Championship against Villanova. Despite a circus shot by Marcus Paige to tie the game at 74 with less than five seconds remaining, the Tar Heels lost on a three pointer as time expired.

== Departures ==
Name	Number	Pos.	Height	Weight	Year	Hometown	Notes
Marcus Paige	5	G	6'2"	175	Senior	Marion, Iowa	Graduated/NBA draft
Brice Johnson	11	F	6'10"	230	Senior	Orangeburg, South Carolina	Graduated/NBA Draft
Justin Coleman	31	G	6'1"	185	Senior	Raleigh, North Carolina	Graduated
Toby Egbuna	34	F	6'4"	225	Senior	Clemmons, North Carolina	Graduated
Joel James	42	C	6'11"	280	Senior	West Palm Beach, Florida	Graduated
Spenser Dalton	43	G	6'3"	215	Senior	Asheville, North Carolina	Graduated

== 2016 recruiting class ==
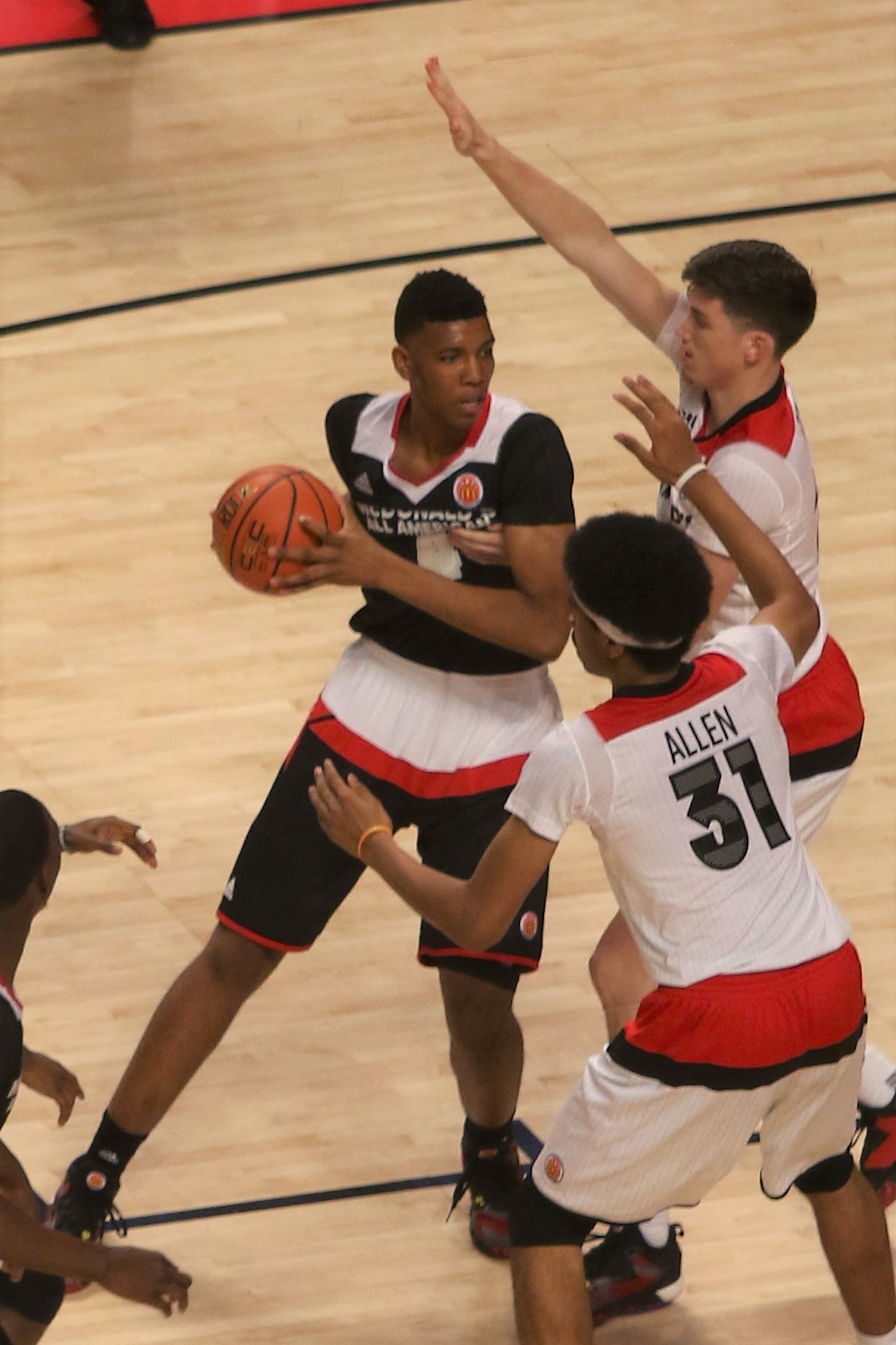
Tony Bradley at the 2016 McDonald's All-American Game

College recruiting information
Name	Hometown	School	Height	Weight	Commit date
Tony Bradley; C	Bartow, Florida	Bartow High School	6 ft 10 in (2.08 m)	235 lb (107 kg)	Sep 2, 2015
Tony Bradley; C	Recruit ratings: Scout: Rivals: 247Sports: ESPN:				
Brandon Robinson; SG	Douglasville, Georgia	Douglas County High School	6 ft 5 in (1.96 m)	170 lb (77 kg)	Sep 28, 2015
Brandon Robinson; SG	Recruit ratings: Scout: Rivals: 247Sports: ESPN:				
Seventh Woods; SG	Columbia, South Carolina	Hammond School	6 ft 1 in (1.85 m)	185 lb (84 kg)	Nov 11, 2015
Seventh Woods; SG	Recruit ratings: Scout: Rivals: 247Sports: ESPN:				
Shea Rush; SF	Kansas City, Missouri	The Barstow School	6 ft 6 in (1.98 m)	190 lb (86 kg)	Feb 14, 2016
Shea Rush; SF	Recruit ratings: Scout: Rivals: 247Sports: ESPN:				
Overall recruit ranking: Scout: #9 Rivals: #9 247Sports: #11 ESPN: #12
Note: In many cases, Scout, Rivals, 247Sports, On3, and ESPN may conflict in their listings of height and weight.; In these cases, the average was taken. ESPN grades are on a 100-point scale.; Sources:

== Roster ==
2016–17 North Carolina Tar Heels men's basketball team
Players
Coaches

Pos.	#	Name	Height	Weight	Year	Previous school	Hometown
G	0	Nate Britt	6 ft 1 in (1.85 m)	175 lb (79 kg)	Sr	Oak Hill Academy	Upper Marlboro, Maryland
G/F	1	Theo Pinson	6 ft 6 in (1.98 m)	205 lb (93 kg)	Jr	Wesleyan Christian Academy	Greensboro, North Carolina
G	2	Joel Berry II (C)	6 ft 0 in (1.83 m)	195 lb (88 kg)	Jr	Lake Highland Prep	Apopka, Florida
F	3	Kennedy Meeks	6 ft 10 in (2.08 m)	260 lb (118 kg)	Sr	West Charlotte	Charlotte, North Carolina
F	4	Isaiah Hicks	6 ft 9 in (2.06 m)	235 lb (107 kg)	Sr	J.F. Webb	Oxford, North Carolina
C	5	Tony Bradley	6 ft 10 in (2.08 m)	235 lb (107 kg)	Fr	Bartow High School	Bartow, Florida
SF	11	Shea Rush (W)	6 ft 6 in (1.98 m)	185 lb (84 kg)	Fr	The Barstow School	Kansas City, Missouri
G	13	Kanler Coker (W)	6 ft 4 in (1.93 m)	200 lb (91 kg)	Sr	North Hall/Flowery Branch	Gainesville, Georgia
G	14	Brandon Robinson	6 ft 5 in (1.96 m)	170 lb (77 kg)	Fr	Douglas County High School	Douglasville, Georgia
G	21	Seventh Woods	6 ft 1 in (1.85 m)	185 lb (84 kg)	Fr	Hammond School	Columbia, South Carolina
G	24	Kenny Williams	6 ft 4 in (1.93 m)	175 lb (79 kg)	So	L.C. Bird	Midlothian, Virginia
F	25	Aaron Rohlman (W)	6 ft 6 in (1.98 m)	210 lb (95 kg)	Jr	Hunter Huss	Gastonia, North Carolina
G	30	Stilman White	6 ft 1 in (1.85 m)	175 lb (79 kg)	RS Sr	Hoggard	Wilmington, North Carolina
F	32	Luke Maye	6 ft 7 in (2.01 m)	230 lb (104 kg)	So	Hough	Huntersville, North Carolina
G/F	44	Justin Jackson	6 ft 8 in (2.03 m)	200 lb (91 kg)	Jr	Homeschool Christian Youth Assoc.	Tomball, Texas

Head coach

- Roy Williams (North Carolina)

Assistant coach(es)

- Steve Robinson (Radford)
- C. B. McGrath (Kansas)
- Hubert Davis (North Carolina)

Legend

- (C) Team captain
- (S) Suspended
- (I) Ineligible
- (W) Walk-on
- Injured
- Current redshirt

Roster

=== Depth chart ===
Pos.	Starting 5	Bench 1	Bench 2	Bench 3
C	Kennedy Meeks	Tony Bradley
PF	Isaiah Hicks	Luke Maye
SF	Justin Jackson		Aaron Rohlman	Shea Rush
SG	Kenny Williams	Theo Pinson	Brandon Robinson	Kanler Coker
PG	Joel Berry	Nate Britt	Seventh Woods	Stilman White

== Schedule and results ==
Date time, TV	Rank^{#}	Opponent^{#}	Result	Record	High points	High rebounds	High assists	Site (attendance) city, state
Exhibition
November 4, 2016*; 7:30 pm	No. 6	UNC Pembroke	W 124–63		20 – Berry II	8 – Maye	7 – Jackson	Dean Smith Center; Chapel Hill, NC
Non-conference regular season
November 11, 2016*; 9:00 pm, ESPNU	No. 6	at Tulane	W 95–75	1–0	27 – Jackson	15 – Meeks	5 – Britt	Smoothie King Center (6,043); New Orleans, LA
November 13, 2016*; 4:00 pm, ESPN2	No. 6	Chattanooga; Maui Invitational	W 97–57	2–0	18 – Berry II	12 – Meeks	5 – Berry II	Dean Smith Center (13,402); Chapel Hill, NC
November 15, 2016*; 8:00 pm, ACCN Extra	No. 5	Long Beach State	W 93–67	3–0	23 – Berry II	10 – Jackson	6 – Woods	Dean Smith Center (12,581); Chapel Hill, NC
November 19, 2016*; 1:00 am, OC Sports	No. 5	at Hawaii	W 83–68	4–0	16 – Hicks	13 – Bradley	6 – Berry II	Stan Sheriff Center (10,300); Honolulu, HI
November 21, 2016*; 11:30 pm, ESPN2	No. 4	at Chaminade; Maui Invitational Quarterfinals	W 104–61	5–0	22 – Hicks	10 – Meeks	4 – Tied	Lahaina Civic Center (2,400); Maui, HI
November 22, 2016*; 10:30 pm, ESPN2	No. 4	vs. Oklahoma State; Maui Invitational Semifinal	W 107–75	6–0	24 – Berry II	8 – Tied	6 – Jackson	Lahaina Civic Center (2,400); Maui, HI
November 23, 2016*; 9:30 pm, ESPN2	No. 4	vs. No. 16 Wisconsin; Maui Invitational Championship	W 71–56	7–0	22 – Berry II	16 – Meeks	3 – Berry II	Lahaina Civic Center (2,400); Maui, HI
November 30, 2016*; 9:00 pm, ESPN	No. 3	at No. 13 Indiana; ACC-Big Ten Challenge	L 67–76	7–1	21 – Jackson	8 – Tied	8 – Berry II	Assembly Hall (17,222); Bloomington, IN
December 4, 2016*; 2:00 pm, RSN	No. 3	Radford	W 95–50	8–1	19 – Williams	11 – Bradley	6 – Jackson	Dean Smith Center (14,230); Chapel Hill, NC
December 7, 2016*; 9:00 pm, ESPN2	No. 7	Davidson	W 83–74	9–1	27 – Jackson	8 – Jackson	6 – Britt	Dean Smith Center (13,178); Chapel Hill, NC
December 11, 2016*; 5:00 pm, ESPN	No. 7	Tennessee	W 73–71	10–1	12 – Williams	10 – Bradley	7 – Britt	Dean Smith Center (18,745); Chapel Hill, NC
December 17, 2016*; 5:45 pm, CBS	No. 7	vs. No. 6 Kentucky; CBS Sports Classic/Rivalry	L 100–103	10–2	34 – Jackson	7 – Meeks	7 – Berry II	T-Mobile Arena (19,298); Las Vegas, NV
December 21, 2016*; 8:00 pm, ESPN2	No. 8	Northern Iowa	W 85–42	11–2	18 – Meeks	8 – Meeks	5 – Williams	Dean Smith Center (18,033); Chapel Hill, NC
December 28, 2016*; 7:00 pm, ESPNU	No. 9	Monmouth	W 102–74	12–2	28 – Jackson	12 – Meeks	5 – Jackson	Dean Smith Center (20,064); Chapel Hill, NC
ACC Regular Season
December 31, 2016; 12:00 pm, ACCN	No. 9	at Georgia Tech	L 63–75	12–3 (0–1)	16 – Jackson	14 – Meeks	3 – Jackson	Hank McCamish Pavilion (7,754); Atlanta, GA
January 3, 2017; 7:00 pm, ESPN2	No. 14	at Clemson	W 89–86 ^{OT}	13–3 (1–1)	31 – Berry II	16 – Meeks	4 – Meeks	Littlejohn Coliseum (8,716); Clemson, SC
January 8, 2017; 1:00 pm, ESPN	No. 14	NC State; Carolina–State Game	W 107–56	14–3 (2–1)	21 – Jackson	8 – Bradley	5 – Berry II	Dean Smith Center (16,133); Chapel Hill, NC
January 11, 2017; 8:00 pm, ESPN2	No. 11	at Wake Forest	W 93–87	15–3 (3–1)	19 – Jackson	11 – Meeks	7 – Berry II	LJVM Coliseum (13,159); Winston-Salem, NC
January 14, 2017; 2:00 pm, ESPN	No. 11	No. 9 Florida State	W 96–83	16–3 (4–1)	26 – Berry II	15 – Maye	4 – Hicks	Dean Smith Center (21,750); Chapel Hill, NC
January 16, 2017; 7:00 pm, ESPN	No. 9	Syracuse	W 85–68	17–3 (5–1)	20 – Hicks	12 – Meeks	5 – Pinson	Dean Smith Center (20,588); Chapel Hill, NC
January 21, 2017; Noon, ACCN	No. 9	at Boston College	W 90–82	18–3 (6–1)	22 – Jackson	9 – Meeks	4 – Hicks	Conte Forum (8,606); Chestnut Hill, MA
January 26, 2017; 8:00 pm, ESPN	No. 9	Virginia Tech	W 91–72	19–3 (7–1)	26 – Jackson	14 – Meeks	4 – Jackson	Dean Smith Center (20,113); Chapel Hill, NC
January 28, 2017; 1:00 pm, CBS	No. 9	at Miami (FL)	L 62–77	19–4 (7–2)	21 – Jackson	6 – Hicks	4 – Berry II	BankUnited Center (7,563); Coral Gables, FL
January 31, 2017; 7:00 pm, ESPN2	No. 12	Pittsburgh	W 80–78	20–4 (8–2)	20 – Jackson	8 – Hicks	4 – Britt	Dean Smith Center (18,438); Chapel Hill, NC
February 5, 2017; 1:00 pm, ESPNews	No. 12	vs. No. 20 Notre Dame	W 83–76	21–4 (9–2)	16 – Jackson	8 – Meeks	7 – Berry II	Greensboro Coliseum (17,051); Greensboro, NC
February 9, 2017; 8:00 pm, ESPN/ACCN	No. 8	at No. 18 Duke; Rivalry	L 78–86	21–5 (9–3)	21 – Jackson	7 – Pinson	4 – Woods	Cameron Indoor Stadium (9,314); Durham, NC
February 15, 2017; 8:00 pm, ACCN	No. 10	at NC State; Carolina–State Game	W 97–73	22–5 (10–3)	18 – Berry II	8 – Meeks	6 – Berry II	PNC Arena (19,500); Raleigh, NC
February 18, 2017; 8:15 pm, ESPN	No. 10	No. 14 Virginia; ESPN College GameDay	W 65–41	23–5 (11–3)	20 – Jackson	8 – Hicks	6 – Jackson	Dean Smith Center (21,750); Chapel Hill, NC
February 22, 2017; 9:00 pm, ESPN	No. 8	No. 7 Louisville	W 74–63	24–5 (12–3)	21 – Jackson	10 – Meeks	3 – Berry II	Dean Smith Center (21,269); Chapel Hill, NC
February 25, 2017; Noon, ACCN	No. 8	at Pittsburgh	W 85–67	25–5 (13–3)	23 – Jackson	10 – Meeks	7 – Pinson	Petersen Events Center (10,704); Pittsburgh, PA
February 27, 2017; 7:00 pm, ESPN	No. 5	at No. 23 Virginia	L 43–53	25–6 (13–4)	12 – Berry II	7 – Meeks	3 – Maye	John Paul Jones Arena (14,001); Charlottesville, VA
March 4, 2017; 8:00 pm, ESPN	No. 5	No. 17 Duke; Rivalry/ESPN College GameDay	W 90–83	26–6 (14–4)	28 – Berry II	9 – Hicks	7 – Pinson	Dean Smith Center (21,750); Chapel Hill, NC
ACC Tournament
March 9, 2017; 12:00 pm, ESPN	(1) No. 6	vs. (9) Miami (FL); Quarterfinals	W 78–53	27–6	19 – Hicks	7 – Meeks	6 – Pinson	Barclays Center (17,732); Brooklyn, NY
March 10, 2017; 7:00 pm, ESPN	(1) No. 6	vs. (5) No. 14 Duke; Semifinals/Rivalry	L 83–93	27–7	19 – Meeks	12 – Meeks	8 – Pinson	Barclays Center (18,103); Brooklyn, NY
NCAA tournament
March 17, 2017*; 4:00 pm, TNT	(1 S) No. 5	vs. (16 S) Texas Southern; First Round	W 103–64	28–7	21 – Jackson	9 – Maye	5 – Britt	Bon Secours Wellness Arena (14,179); Greenville, SC
March 19, 2017*; 6:10 pm, TNT	(1 S) No. 5	vs. (8 S) Arkansas; Second Round	W 72–65	29–7	16 – Meeks	11 – Meeks	5 – Jackson	Bon Secours Wellness Arena (14,179); Greenville, SC
March 24, 2017*; 7:09 pm, CBS	(1 S) No. 5	vs. (4 S) No. 21 Butler; Sweet Sixteen	W 92–80	30–7	26 – Berry II	12 – Maye	5 – Jackson	FedExForum (16,397); Memphis, TN
March 26, 2017*; 5:05 pm, CBS	(1 S) No. 5	vs. (2 S) No. 6 Kentucky; Elite Eight/Rivalry	W 75–73	31–7	19 – Jackson	17 – Meeks	4 – Jackson	FedEx Forum (16,412); Memphis, TN
April 1, 2017*; 8:49 pm, CBS	(1 S) No. 5	vs. (3 MW) No. 9 Oregon; Final Four	W 77–76	32–7	25 – Meeks	14 – Meeks	5 – Pinson	University of Phoenix Stadium (77,612); Glendale, AZ
April 3, 2017*; 9:20 pm, CBS	(1 S) No. 5	vs. (1 W) No. 2 Gonzaga; National Championship	W 71–65	33–7	22 – Berry II	10 – Meeks	6 – Berry II	University of Phoenix Stadium (76,168); Glendale, AZ
*Non-conference game. ^{#}Rankings from AP Poll. (#) Tournament seedings in parentheses. S=South Region, MW=Midwest, W=West. All times are in Eastern Time.

== Rankings ==
Ranking movements Legend: ██ Increase in ranking ██ Decrease in ranking
	Week																			
Poll	Pre	1	2	3	4	5	6	7	8	9	10	11	12	13	14	15	16	17	18	Final
AP	6	5	4	3	7	7	8	9	14	11	9	9	12	8	10	8	5	6	5	Not released
Coaches	6	6	4	3	5	6	8	10	16	12	9	6	10	7	9	8	5	6	8	1

*AP does not release post-NCAA Tournament rankings

== Players drafted into the NBA ==
Year	Round	Pick	Player	NBA club
2017	1	15	Justin Jackson	Portland Trail Blazers
2017	1	28	Tony Bradley	Los Angeles Lakers
