= Kenny Williams (basketball, born 1996) =

American basketball player

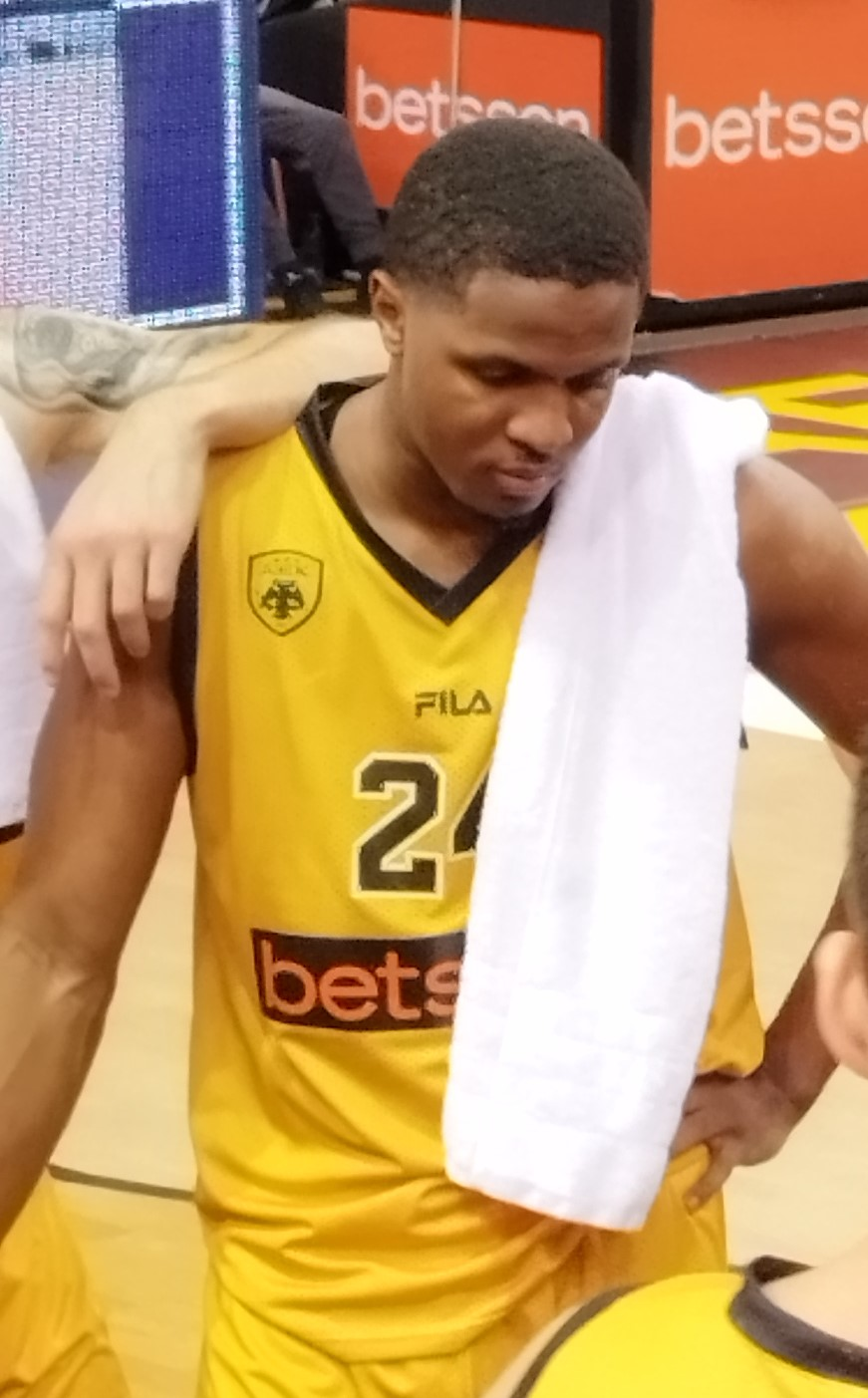
- Williams in action with AEK Athens

Free agent
- Position: Shooting guard / small forward

Personal information
- Born: November 18, 1996 (age 29) Richmond, Virginia, U.S.
- Listed height: 6 ft 4 in (1.93 m)
- Listed weight: 185 lb (84 kg)

Career information
- High school: L. C. Bird (Chesterfield, Virginia)
- College: North Carolina (2015–2019)
- NBA draft: 2019: undrafted
- Playing career: 2019–present

Career history
- 2019–2021: Austin Spurs
- 2021: Bnei Herzliya
- 2021–2022: Kolossos Rodou
- 2022–2023: AEK Athens
- 2023–2024: Peristeri
- 2024–2025: Promitheas Patras

Career highlights
- NCAA champion (2017)
- Stats at Basketball Reference

Kenneth Fleming Williams III (born November 18, 1996) is an American professional basketball player who last played for Promitheas Patras of the Greek Basketball League (GBL). He played college basketball for the North Carolina Tar Heels.

== College career ==
Born and raised in the Richmond, Virginia area, Williams originally committed to play for coach Shaka Smart at nearby Virginia Commonwealth University (VCU). When Smart left VCU for the University of Texas, Williams re-opened his recruitment, eventually choosing the University of North Carolina. As a sophomore, he was a part of the Tar Heels' 2016–17 national championship team. Williams started 22 games before being injured in a February 15 game against NC State, causing him to sit out the remainder of the season.

Williams enjoyed his best college season as a junior, where he averaged 11.4 points per game, including 20 in a rivalry win over Duke. As a senior, Williams was named a captain by head coach Roy Williams.

== Professional career ==
=== Austin Spurs (2019–2021) ===
After going undrafted in the 2019 NBA draft, Williams signed with the San Antonio Spurs for the 2019 NBA Summer League hosted at Vivint Smart Home Arena. After being cut, he was added to the roster of the Spurs' NBA G League affiliate, the Austin Spurs. On March 6, 2020, Williams scored 31 points in a 117–114 overtime win against the Northern Arizona Suns. In 15 games, he averaged 11 points, 4.5 rebounds and 1.8 assists.

=== Bnei Herzliya (2021) ===
On April 13, 2021, Williams signed with Bnei Rav-Bariach Herzliya of the Israeli Ligat Winner Sal.

=== Kolossos Rodou (2021–2022) ===
On August 17, 2021, Williams signed with Greek club Kolossos Rodou. In 25 games, he averaged 12.7 points, 3.6 rebounds, 2.2 assists and 1.3 steals, playing around 32 minutes per contest.

=== AEK Athens (2022–2023) ===
On July 9, 2022, Williams signed with AEK Athens, following his Kolossos Rodou coach Ilias Kantzouris. In 23 domestic league games, he averaged 11.6 points, 2.9 rebounds and 1.8 assists, playing around 27 minutes per contest.

=== Peristeri (2023–2024) ===
On June 17, 2023, Williams signed with Peristeri, his third consecutive Greek club.

On February 28, 2026, Williams signed for La Laguna Tenerife of the Spanish Liga ACB and the Basketball Champions League (BCL). However, he failed his medical check, so the signing was cancelled on March 3, 2026.

== Career statistics ==
Legend
GP	Games played	GS	Games started	MPG	Minutes per game
FG%	Field goal percentage	3P%	3-point field goal percentage	FT%	Free throw percentage
RPG	Rebounds per game	APG	Assists per game	SPG	Steals per game
BPG	Blocks per game	PPG	Points per game	**Bold**	Career high

=== College ===
Year	Team	GP	GS	MPG	FG%	3P%	FT%	RPG	APG	SPG	BPG	PPG
2015–16	North Carolina	29	0	4.2	.364	.077	**1.000**	.4	.2	.1	.0	.8
2016–17	North Carolina	26	22	23.7	.417	.338	.633	3.3	2.2	.9	.3	6.2
2017–18	North Carolina	**37**	**36**	**31.1**	**.486**	**.402**	.704	3.7	2.4	**1.0**	**.5**	**11.4**
2018–19	North Carolina	36	**36**	30.0	.399	.295	.797	**3.9**	**3.5**	.9	.3	8.6
Career		128	94	23.2	.439	.342	.740	2.9	2.2	.8	.3	7.1

=== G-League ===
Year	Team	GP	GS	MPG	FG%	3P%	FT%	RPG	APG	SPG	BPG	PPG
2019–20	Austin	39	14	22.5	.387	.296	.84	2.7	2.1	.7	.2	7.5
Career		39	14	22.5	.387	.296	.84	2.7	2.1	.7	.2	7.5
