= Nate Britt =

American basketball player (born 1994)

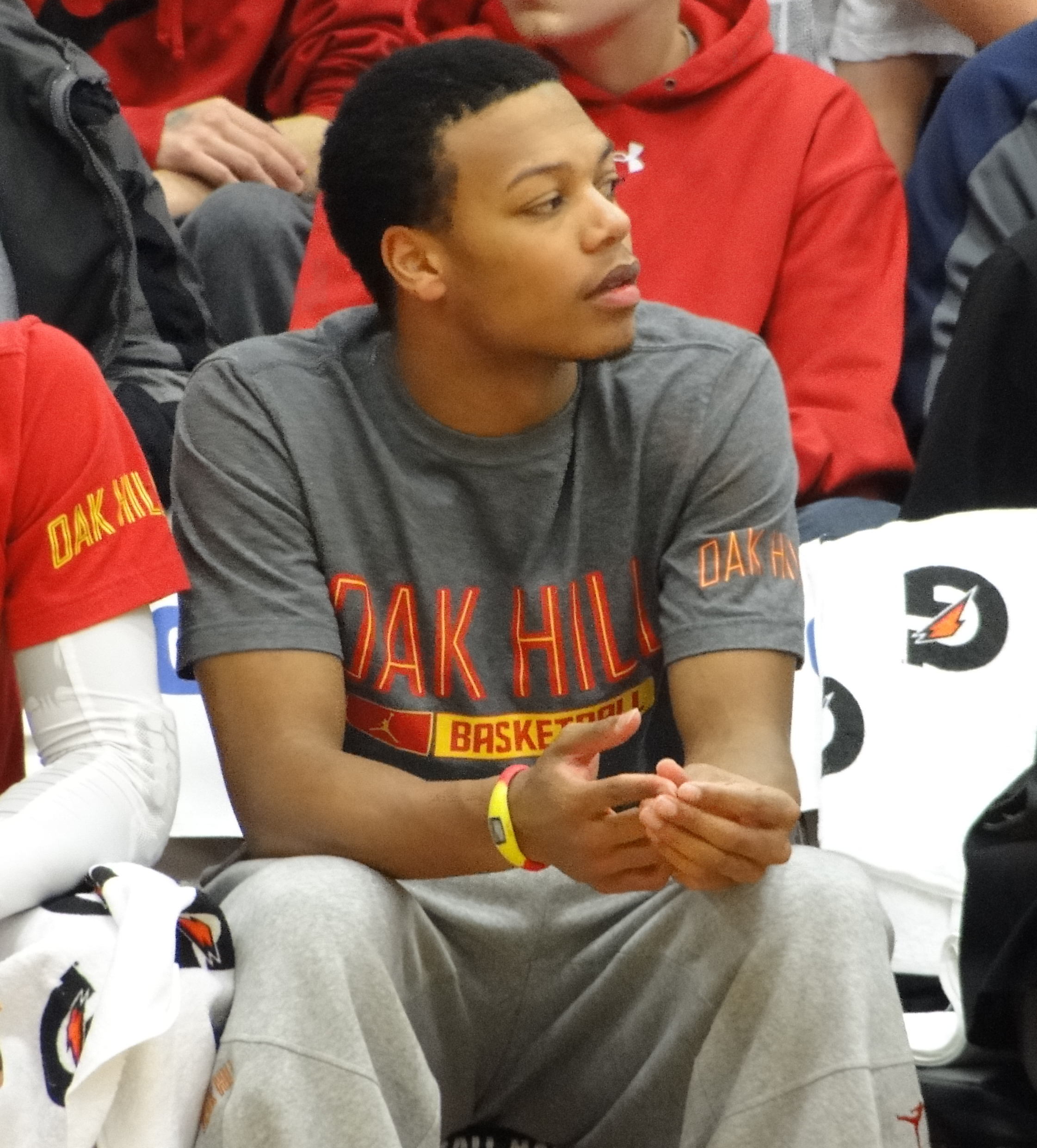
- Britt at Oak Hill Academy, 2012

Stanford Cardinal
- Title: Director of player development
- League: Atlantic Coast Conference

Personal information
- Born: January 13, 1994 (age 32) Upper Marlboro, Maryland, U.S.
- Listed height: 6 ft 1 in (1.85 m)
- Listed weight: 165 lb (75 kg)

Career information
- High school: Gonzaga College HS (Washington, D.C.); Oak Hill Academy (Mouth of Wilson, Virginia)
- College: North Carolina (2013–2017)
- NBA draft: 2017: undrafted
- Playing career: 2017–2022
- Position: Point guard
- Number: 13
- Coaching career: 2022–present

Career history

Playing
- 2017–2018: Glasgow Rocks
- 2018: Panionios
- 2018–2019: Boca Juniors
- 2019–2020: Omonia
- 2020–2021: Panthers Schwenningen
- 2021–2022: Yoast United

Coaching
- 2022–present: Stanford (director of player development)

Career highlights
- NCAA champion (2017)

Nathaniel Cleveland Britt II (born January 13, 1994) is an American former professional basketball player. He had a decorated college career at North Carolina where he won a national NCAA championship in 2017. Following this, Britt played five seasons of professional basketball in several countries.

== Early life ==
Britt is the son of Melody Britt and Nate Britt Sr, a police officer. He has a younger sister, Natalya. His friendship with Kris Jenkins, who went on to play for Villanova, began when they were 11 years old playing for the same AAU team coached by Britt's father. The Britts took Jenkins in, to live with them in their Upper Marlboro, Maryland home in 2007. Britt was named Washington, D.C. player of the year in high school. He played for the USA under-18 national team, winning gold in the FIBA Americas under-18 Championships in Brazil in 2012.

== College career ==
Britt started his first ten games as a freshman at North Carolina. He had 10 points in an NCAA Tournament win over Arkansas.

An ambidextrous player through high school, Britt changed shooting hands from left to right as a sophomore after shooting 36.7% from the field and 25% from three his freshman season.

As a junior, Britt posted 5.4 points and 1.7 assists while only playing 15.4 minutes per game as a backup to Joel Berry II. He shot 38% from the field and 32% from behind the arc as the Tar Heels reached the NCAA Tournament final. As a senior, Britt averaged 4.5 points and 2.4 assists per game. The Tar Heels won the 2017 NCAA Tournament, defeating Gonzaga in the title game.

== Professional career ==
Britt played with the Atlanta Hawks in the NBA summer league. He was signed by the Westchester Knicks of the NBA G League on November 16, 2017. However, he was waived on November 28.

In December 2017, he signed with the Glasgow Rocks of the British Basketball League.

On July 24, 2018, Britt signed with Panionios in Greece. On September 24, 2018, he was replaced on the roster of the Greek team.

Britt signed with Boca Juniors in Argentina on December 5, 2018.

In August 2019, Britt signed with Omonia B.C. in Cyprus.

On May 28, 2020, Britt signed with the Wiha Panthers Schwenningen of Germany's ProA league. Britt joins the Panthers for the 2020–21 season after the 2019–20 season was abandoned due to the COVID-19 pandemic.

On July 22, 2021, Britt signed with Yoast United of the Dutch BNXT League.

== Coaching career ==
On July 22, Britt joined the coaching staff of the Stanford Cardinal as the new director of player development.

== Personal ==
Britt graduated from North Carolina with a degree in management and society.

== Career statistics ==
=== Professional ===
Legend
GP	Games played	MPG	Minutes per game	FG%	Field goal percentage
3P%	3-point field goal percentage	FT%	Free throw percentage	RPG	Rebounds per game
APG	Assists per game	SPG	Steals per game	BPG	Blocks per game
PPG	Points per game	**Bold**	Career high		Led the league

Year	Team	GP	GS	MPG	FG%	3P%	FT%	RPG	APG	SPG	BPG	PPG
2017–18	Glasgow Rocks	25	24	28.5	.378	.268	**.815**	3.7	3.6	1.8	.3	11.7
2018–19	Boca Juniors	10	1	15.1	.340	.286	.500	1.9	1.2	.3	.1	3.7
2019–20	Omonia Nicosia	21	20	**33.7**	.382	.254	.775	**4.1**	3.6	1.8	.1	**14.5**
2020–21	Wiha Panthers Schwenningen	31	29	30.0	.419	**.359**	.808	3.7	**5.4**	**2.2**	.3	13.6
2021–22	Yoast United	**32**	**31**	33.2	**.442**	.284	.675	3.5	4.9	2.1	.2	12.7

=== College ===
Year	Team	GP	GS	MPG	FG%	3P%	FT%	RPG	APG	SPG	BPG	PPG
2013–2014	North Carolina	34	**16**	**20.9**	.367	.250	.794	1.4	2.4	**1.1**	.1	5.1
2014–2015	North Carolina	38	3	15.3	.384	**.366**	**.882**	1.4	1.5	.5	.0	**5.5**
2015–2016	North Carolina	39	0	15.4	.384	.321	.800	1.5	1.7	.6	.0	5.4
2016–2017	North Carolina	**40**	7	19.0	.354	.333	.730	**1.8**	2.4	1.0	.1	4.5
**Career**		151	26	17.6	.372	.335	.812	1.5	2.0	.8	.0	5.1
