= Kennedy Meeks =

American basketball player

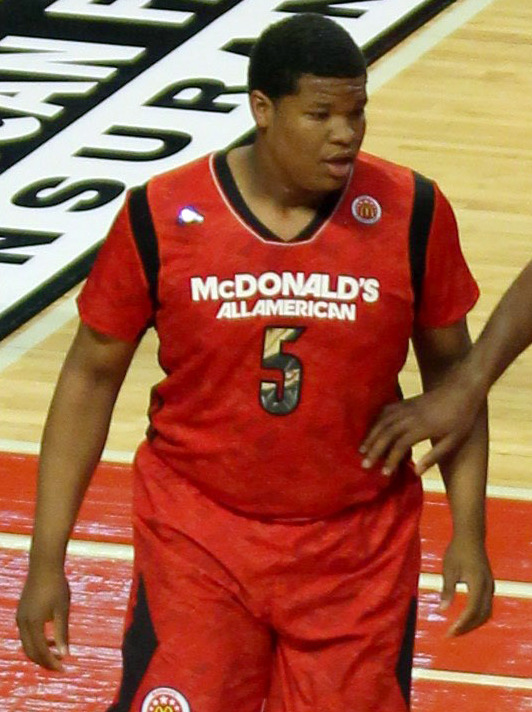
- Meeks in the 2013 McDonald's All-American Boys Game

Free Agent
- Position: Center

Personal information
- Born: February 5, 1995 (age 31) Charlotte, North Carolina, U.S.
- Listed height: 6 ft 10 in (2.08 m)
- Listed weight: 250 lb (113 kg)

Career information
- High school: West Charlotte (Charlotte, North Carolina)
- College: North Carolina (2013–2017)
- NBA draft: 2017: undrafted
- Playing career: 2017–present

Career history
- 2017–2018: Raptors 905
- 2018–2019: SeaHorses Mikawa
- 2019–2020: Levanga Hokkaido
- 2020–2021: Seoul Samsung Thunders
- 2021: Changwon LG Sakers
- 2021–2022: Cholet Basket
- 2022: Marineros de Puerto Plata
- 2023–2024: Taoyuan Pauian Pilots
- 2024–2025: Hsinchu Toplus Lioneers
- 2026: Saitama Broncos

Career highlights
- NCAA champion (2017); ACC All-Freshman team (2014); McDonald's All-American (2013)
- Stats at Basketball Reference

Kennedy Rashod Meeks (born February 5, 1995) is an American professional basketball player who last played for the Saitama Broncos of the B.League. He played college basketball for North Carolina. He is a native of Charlotte, North Carolina.

== High school career ==
Meeks attended West Charlotte High School, where he averaged 19 points, 16 rebounds, and 3 blocks as a senior. He was named to the McDonald's All-America team in 2013.

== College career ==
=== Freshman season (2013–14) ===
As a freshman, Meeks averaged 7.6 points and 6.1 rebounds in 16.3 minutes per game and was named to the ACC All-Freshman team. He worked with North Carolina strength and conditioning coach Jonas Sahratian to slim down in the offseason.

=== Sophomore season (2014–15) ===
As a sophomore, Meeks was named an honorable mention All-ACC performer. He sprained his left knee in the Tar Heels' Round of 32 NCAA Tournament victory over Arkansas. At the time, he was averaging 11.6 points, second behind Marcus Paige and he led the team in rebounds with 7.4 rebounds in 23.6 minutes per game. He was in the midst of a scoring slump before the injury, scoring more than 10 points only once in the last eight games.

=== Junior season (2015–16) ===
As a junior, Meeks scored a career high 25 points against Temple University. On January 16, 2016, Meeks scored 23 points and 6 rebounds in a 67–55 victory against NC State. He injured his left knee and was out for two weeks mid-season. He returned and helped lead UNC to the National Championship game, where they lost to a buzzer beater by Villanova's Kris Jenkins.

=== Senior season (2016–17) ===
In his senior season, he helped the Tar Heels reach a second consecutive NCAA championship game, and he grabbed 10 rebounds to help his team beat the Gonzaga Bulldogs 71–65. Meeks registered a strong run of performances at the end of the season, breaking Tyler Hansbrough's school record for the most rebounds in an NCAA tournament.

== College statistics ==
Year	Team	GP	GS	MPG	FG%	3P%	FT%	RPG	APG	SPG	BPG	PPG
2013–14	North Carolina	34	17	16.3	.548	-	.586	6.1	.8	.3	.8	7.6
2014–15	North Carolina	37	32	23.3	.562	.000	.641	7.3	1.1	.6	1.2	11.4
2015–16	North Carolina	33	28	20.6	.563	–	.708	5.9	1	.8	1	9.8
2016–17	North Carolina	40	40	24.3	.555	–	.622	9.5	1	1	1.2	12.5
Career		144	117	21.3	.557	.000	.634	7.3	1	.7	1.1	10.4

== Professional career ==
=== Raptors 905 (2017–2018) ===
After going undrafted in the 2017 NBA draft, Meeks was signed by the Toronto Raptors for their Summer League team and for training camp. He was waived by the Raptors on October 7, 2017. As an affiliate player, he was picked up by the Raptors 905.

=== SeaHorses Mikawa (2018–2019) ===
On November 22, 2018, Kennedy Meeks signed with the SeaHorses Mikawa of the Japanese B.League.

=== Levanga Hokkaido (2019–2020) ===
On June 30, 2019, Meeks signed with the Charlotte Hornets for the Summer League.

On August 7, 2019, Meeks signed with Levanga Hokkaido of the Japanese B.League.

=== Seoul Samsung Thunders (2020–2021) ===
On December 8, 2020, Meeks signed with the Seoul Samsung Thunders of the Korean Basketball League to replace Jessie Govan.

=== Cholet Basket (2021–2022) ===
On September 29, 2021, Meeks signed with Cholet Basket of the LNB Pro A.

=== Taoyuan Paiuan Pilots (2023–2024) ===
On September 13, 2023, Meeks signed with Taoyuan Pauian Pilots of the P. League+.

=== Hsinchu Toplus Lioneers (2024–2025) ===
On October 1, 2024, Meeks signed with the Hsinchu Toplus Lioneers of the Taiwan Professional Basketball League (TPBL).

=== Saitama Broncos (2026–present) ===
On January 9, 2026, Meeks signed with the Saitama Broncos of the B.League for the 2025–26 season.

== Career statistics ==
Legend
GP	Games played	MPG	Minutes per game	FG%	Field goal percentage
3P%	3-point field goal percentage	FT%	Free throw percentage	RPG	Rebounds per game
APG	Assists per game	SPG	Steals per game	BPG	Blocks per game
PPG	Points per game	**Bold**	Career high		Led the league

Year	Team	League	GP	MPG	FG%	3P%	FT%	RPG	APG	SPG	BPG	PPG
2017–18	Raptors 905	NBA G League	45	27.7	.505	.056	.761	9.5	1.6	1.0	1.0	12.9
2018–19	Aishin Sea Horses	B.League	37	32.0	.493	.222	.695	11.0	5.2	1.0	1.1	14.7
2019–20	Levanga Hokkaido	B.League	31	34.1	.514	.364	.825	11.0	2.7	1.2	1.2	21.0
2020–21	Seoul Samsung Thunders	KBL	8	17.6	.429	.000	.500	7.6	.9	.6	.1	8.6
2021–22	Cholet Basket	LNB Pro A	25	15.5	.463	.318	.818	3.6	.8	.6	.3	7.4

=== Playoff statistics ===
Year	Team	GP	GS	MPG	FG%	3P%	FT%	RPG	APG	SPG	BPG	PPG
2018	Raptors 905	5	5	25.3	.488	.250	.727	9.4	.8	.8	.4	9.8
**Career**		5	5	25.3	.488	.250	.727	9.4	.8	.8	.4	9.8
