= 2017 West Coast Conference men's basketball tournament =

- Classification: Division I
- Season: 2016–17
- Teams: 10
- Site: Orleans Arena; Paradise, Nevada
- Champions: Gonzaga (16th title)
- Winning coach: Mark Few (14th title)
- MVP: Nigel Williams-Goss (Gonzaga)

2016–17 West Coast Conference men's basketball standings
	Conf.				Overall
Team	W		L	PCT	W		L	PCT
No. 2 Gonzaga †	17	–	1	.944	37	–	2	.949
No. 22 Saint Mary's	16	–	2	.889	29	–	5	.853
BYU	12	–	6	.667	22	–	12	.647
San Francisco	10	–	8	.556	20	–	13	.606
Santa Clara	10	–	8	.556	17	–	16	.515
Loyola Marymount	8	–	10	.444	15	–	15	.500
San Diego	6	–	12	.333	13	–	18	.419
Pepperdine	5	–	13	.278	9	–	22	.290
Pacific	4	–	14	.222	11	–	22	.333
Portland	2	–	16	.111	11	–	22	.333
† Conference tournament winner Rankings from AP poll

The 2017 West Coast Conference men's basketball tournament was a postseason men's basketball tournament for the West Coast Conference held March 3–7, 2017 at the Orleans Arena in Paradise, Nevada. Regular-season champion Gonzaga also won the WCC tournament, and with it the conference's automatic bid into the 2017 NCAA tournament with a 74–56 win over Saint Mary's in the finals.

The WCC's eight-year tournament contract with Orleans Arena expired after the 2016 WCC tournament, with the WCC looking to potentially moving the tournament to a different Las Vegas-area venue (the MGM Grand Garden Arena or the T-Mobile Arena), keep it at the Orleans Arena, or move it elsewhere. In May 2016, the WCC announced that it reached an agreement on a new three-year contract with the Orleans Arena, which will run through the 2019 WCC year-end tournament.

== Seeds ==
All 10 WCC teams were eligible for the tournament. The top six teams received a first round bye. Teams were seeded by record within the conference, with a tiebreaker system to seed teams with identical conference records.

Seed	School	Conference	Tiebreaker
1	Gonzaga	17–1	
2	Saint Mary's	16–2	
3	BYU	12–6	
4	Santa Clara	10–8	1–1 vs SF, 0–2 vs Gonzaga, 0–2 vs SMC, 1–1 vs BYU
5	San Francisco	10–8	1–1 vs SCU, 0–2 vs Gonzaga, 0–2 vs SMC, 0–2 vs BYU
6	Loyola Marymount	8–10	
7	San Diego	6–12	
8	Pepperdine	5–13	
9	Pacific	4–14	
10	Portland	2–16	

== Schedule ==
Session	Game	Time*	Matchup	Score	Television
First round – Friday, March 3
1	1	6:00 PM	No. 8 Pepperdine vs. No. 9 Pacific	84–89	BYUtv
1	2	8:00 PM	No. 7 San Diego vs. No. 10 Portland	55–60	BYUtv
Quarterfinals – Saturday, March 4
2	3	1:00 PM	No. 3 BYU vs. No. 6 Loyola Marymount	89–81	BYUtv/RTRM/CSNBA
2	4	3:00 PM	No. 4 Santa Clara vs. No. 5 San Francisco	76–69	BYUtv/RTRM/CSNBA
3	5	7:00 PM	No. 1 Gonzaga vs. No. 9 Pacific	82–50	ESPN2
3	6	9:00 PM	No. 2 Saint Mary's vs. No. 10 Portland	81–58	ESPN2
Semifinals – Monday, March 6
4	7	6:00 PM	No. 1 Gonzaga vs No. 4 Santa Clara	77–68	ESPN
4	8	8:30 PM	No. 2 Saint Mary's vs No. 3 BYU	81–50	ESPN2
Championship – Tuesday, March 7
5	9	6:00 PM	No. 1 Gonzaga vs. No. 2 Saint Mary's	74–56	ESPN
*Game times in PT. Rankings denote tournament seeding.

== Bracket ==
First round Friday, March 3
8	Pepperdine	84
9	Pacific	89
7	San Diego	55
10	Portland	60

Quarterfinals; Saturday, March 4
1	Gonzaga	82
9	Pacific	50
4	Santa Clara	76
5	San Francisco	69
2	Saint Mary's	81
10	Portland	58
3	BYU	89
6	Loyola Marymount	81

Semifinals; Monday, March 6
1	Gonzaga	77
4	Santa Clara	68
2	Saint Mary's	81
3	BYU	50

Championship; Tuesday, March 7
1	Gonzaga	74
2	Saint Mary's	56

== Game summaries ==
=== First round ===
==== No. 8 Pepperdine vs. No. 9 Pacific ====
Broadcasters: Dave McCann, Blaine Fowler
Series History: Pacific leads 31–27

BYUtv

Mar 3
6:00 pm

No. 9 Pacific 89, No. 8 Pepperdine 84
Scoring by half: 41–42, 48–42
Pts: R. Bowles 26; Rebs: J. Williams 9 Asts: R. Bowles 7	Pts: L. Murray Jr 41; Rebs: L. Murray Jr 10; Asts: J. Major 7

Orleans Arena
Paradise, NV
Attendance: 7,484
Referees: Verne Harris, Mike Scyphers, David Hall

==== No. 7 San Diego vs. No. 10 Portland ====
Broadcasters: Dave McCann, Blaine Fowler
Series History: San Diego leads 52–29

BYUtv

Mar 3
8:00 pm

No. 7 San Diego 55, No. 10 Portland 60
Scoring by half: 32–29, 28–26
Pts: B. Bailey 19; Rebs: B. Bailey 8 Asts: 2 with 3	Pts: J. Johnson 17; Rebs: G. Taylor 7 Asts: X. Hallinan 2

Orleans Arena
Paradise, NV
Attendance: 7,484
Referees: Randy McCall, Michael Reed, Tony Padilla

=== Quarterfinals ===
==== No. 3 BYU vs. No. 6 Loyola Marymount ====
Broadcasters: Dave McCann, Blaine Fowler
Series History: BYU leads 13–3

BYUtv/RTRM/CSNBA

Mar 4
1:00 pm

No. 3 BYU 89, No. 6 Loyola Marymount 81
Scoring by half: 42–38, 47–43
Pts: E. Mika 25; Rebs: Y. Childs 7 Asts: Y. Childs 5	Pts: B. Brown 22; Rebs: K. Amayo 8 Asts: K. Amayo 4

Orleans Arena
Paradise, NV
Attendance: 7,461
Referees: Ronald Brokenbrough, Dennis Flannery, Ken Ditty

==== No. 4 Santa Clara vs. No. 5 San Francisco ====
Broadcasters: Dave McCann, Blaine Fowler
Series History: Santa Clara leads 79–76

BYUtv/RTRM/CSNBA

Mar 4
3:00 pm

No. 4 Santa Clara 76, No. 5 San Francisco 69
Scoring by half: 33–35, 43–34
Pts: J. Brownridge 28; Rebs: 2 tied with 6 Asts: M. Hauser 5	Pts: R. Boyce 33; Rebs: 3 tied with 5 Asts: 4 tied with 1

Orleans Arena
Paradise, NV
Attendance: 7,461
Referees: Coban Lopez, Klaus Endrissat, Chad Shepherd

==== No. 1 Gonzaga vs. No. 9 Pacific ====
Broadcasters: Roxy Bernstein, Jon Barry
Series History: Gonzaga leads 12–1

ESPN2

Mar 4
7:00 pm

No. 1 Gonzaga 82, No. 9 Pacific 50
Scoring by half: 27–25, 55–25
Pts: J. Matthews 22; Rebs: P. Karnowski 9 Asts: N. Williams-Goss 4	Pts: T.J. Wallace 21; Rebs: A. Townes 7 Asts: M. Haynes 3

Orleans Arena
Paradise, NV
Referees: Mark Cook, Courtney Holmes, Travis Schatzman

==== No. 2 Saint Mary's vs. No. 10 Portland ====
Broadcasters: Roxy Bernstein, Jon Barry
Series History: Saint Mary's leads 65–29

ESPN2

Mar 4
8:59 pm

No. 2 Saint Mary's 81, No. 10 Portland 58
Scoring by half: 32–27, 49–31
Pts: C. Hermanson 21; Rebs: J. Landale 12; Asts: E. Naar 11	Pts: J. Johnson 26; Rebs: J. Johnson 6 Asts: X. Hallinan 3

Orleans Arena
Paradise, NV
Referees: Horace Shields, Toby Doolittle, Justin Shamion

=== Semifinals ===
==== No. 1 Gonzaga vs. No. 4 Santa Clara ====
Broadcasters: Dave O'Brien, Dick Vitale, Jeff Goodman
Series History: Gonzaga leads 59–30

ESPN

Mar 6
6:00 pm

No. 1 Gonzaga 77, No. 4 Santa Clara 68
Scoring by half: 37–29, 40–39
Pts: N. Williams-Goss 25; Rebs: N. Williams-Goss 8 Asts: N. Williams-Goss 5	Pts: J. Brownridge 32; Rebs: 2 tied with 6 Asts: M. Hauser 3

Orleans Arena
Paradise, NV
Referees: Verne Harris, Mike Reed, David Hall

==== No. 2 Saint Mary's vs. No. 3 BYU ====
Broadcasters: Dave O'Brien, Jon Barry, Jeff Goodman
Series History: BYU leads 12–11

ESPN2

Mar 6
8:30 pm

No. 2 Saint Mary's 81, No. 3 BYU 50
Scoring by half: 36–20, 45–20
Pts: J. Landale 22; Rebs: J. Landale 10; Asts: E. Naar 11	Pts: T. Haws 13; Rebs: E. Mika 7 Asts: N. Emery 2

Orleans Arena
Paradise, NV
Referees: Randy McCall, Dick Cartmell, Tony Padilla

=== Championship ===
==== No. 1 Gonzaga vs. No. 2 Saint Mary's ====
Broadcasters: Dave O'Brien, Dick Vitale, Jeff Goodman
Series History: Gonzaga leads 67–29

ESPN

Mar 7
6:00 pm

No. 1 Gonzaga 74, No. 2 Saint Mary's 56
Scoring by half: 39–18, 35–38
Pts: N. Williams-Goss 22; Rebs: P. Karnowski 10; Asts: N. Williams-Goss 6	Pts: C. Hermanson 14; Rebs: J. Landale 5 Asts: J. Rahon 5

Orleans Arena
Paradise, NV
Attendance: 8,179
Referees: Randy McCall, Verne Harris, David Hall

== See also ==
- West Coast Conference men's basketball tournament
- 2017 West Coast Conference women's basketball tournament
