= Brian Michaelson =

American basketball coach (born 1981)

Gonzaga Bulldogs
- Position: Assistant coach
- League: West Coast Conference

Personal information
- Born: October 29, 1981 (age 45) Portland, Oregon, U.S.
- Listed height: 6 ft 4 in (1.93 m)
- Listed weight: 196 lb (89 kg)

Career information
- High school: Jesuit (Beaverton, Oregon)
- College: Gonzaga (2001–2005)

Career history

Coaching
- 2008–2011: Gonzaga (admin. asst.)
- 2011–2013: Gonzaga (asst. DBO)
- 2013–present: Gonzaga (assistant)

Brian Michaelson (born October 29, 1981) is an American college basketball coach and former player who is an assistant coach at Gonzaga University.

== Biography ==
=== High school career ===
Born in Portland, Oregon, Michaelson attended Jesuit High School in Beaverton, where he graduated in 2000.

As a junior, alongside Mike Dunleavy Jr., Michaelson averaged 14.5 points and 5.5 rebounds. He was named All-Metro and State 4A Tournament second-team, as well as honorable mention All-State. He helped Jesuit win the Oregon State 4A Tournament with a 26–2 record.

As a senior, Michaelson proved he could be a strong force for Jesuit and lead them to victory, even though the team lost the state's player of the year and Duke signee, Mike Dunleavy, to graduation. Despite overcoming significant height disadvantage, Michaselson led Jesuit to a win over the nation's consensus number 1 high school team in the country, Rice of New York, in the Les Schwab Oregon Holiday Invitational. Michaelson scored 22 of his 30 points in the second half in a 75–62 win over Rice, earning himself MVP of the tournament. For the season, Michaelson averaged 19.8 points and 5.5 rebounds and led Jesuit to the semifinals of the Oregon State Class 4A Tournament and a 26–2 record. He was named Metro League Player of the Year, first-team All-State, and State 4A Tournament first-team.

=== College career ===
Brian Michaelson joined Gonzaga men's basketball in 2000 as a walk-on and redshirted his freshman season. Michaelson would see minimal playing time throughout his five-year campaign at Gonzaga, but he was placed on scholarship and was named the team's co-captain as a senior for the 2004–05 season. He graduated with a degree in business administration.

=== Coaching career ===
Michaelson joined the Gonzaga men's basketball staff as an administrative assistant in 2008. He remained in that position until the spring of 2011, when he was named the assistant director of basketball operations. He was a major factor for the Gonzaga men's basketball, despite doing most of his work behind the scenes. He arranged travel, coordinated schedules, ordered equipment, and gave much of his time to organize the successful team and individual summer basketball camps.

After Ray Giacoletti decided to become head coach of Drake, Michaelson took over the available assistant coach position in July 2013 under head coach Mark Few. He saw his role expand to scouting, player development, and recruiting, as well as practice and game planning. Michaelson has limited experience recruiting in his first year as an assistant coach and had to lean on the other coaches for advice, but he quickly became a juggernaut in Gonzaga's recruiting and player development efforts. Michaelson helped lead Gonzaga's recruiting efforts in landing high-profile transfers, like Kyle Wiltjer (Kentucky), Byron Wesley (USC), Nigel Williams-Goss (Washington), and Johnathan Williams (Missouri). He also led Gonzaga's charge to signing Zach Collins, the program's first McDonald's All-American straight out of high school, as well as 2017 commit Corey Kispert.

=== Personal ===
Michaelson married Sarah Hawkins, former Gonzaga women's soccer player and strength and conditioning coach for the Zags. They have two children. He has two younger siblings who both attended Jesuit High School. His sister, Emily, played soccer for the University of Portland. His brother, Christo, is a soccer player at Gonzaga.
