= 2004–05 Gonzaga Bulldogs men's basketball team =

American college basketball season

2004–05 Gonzaga Bulldogs men's basketball

WCC Regular Season Champions WCC tournament champions

NCAA tournament, Round of 32
- Conference: West Coast Conference

Ranking
- Coaches: No. 18
- AP: No. 10
- Record: 26–5 (12–2 WCC)
- Head coach: Mark Few (6th season)
- Assistant coaches: Bill Grier (14th season); Leon Rice (6th season); Tommy Lloyd (4th season)
- Home arena: McCarthey Athletic Center

2004–05 West Coast Conference men's basketball standings
	Conf.				Overall
Team	W		L	PCT	W		L	PCT
No. 10 Gonzaga	12	–	2	.857	26	–	5	.839
Saint Mary's	11	–	3	.786	25	–	9	.735
Santa Clara	7	–	7	.500	15	–	16	.484
San Diego	7	–	7	.500	16	–	13	.552
Pepperdine	6	–	8	.429	17	–	14	.548
San Francisco	6	–	8	.429	17	–	14	.548
Portland	4	–	10	.286	15	–	15	.500
Loyola Marymount	3	–	11	.214	11	–	17	.393
† 2005 WCC tournament winner Rankings from AP Poll

The 2004–05 Gonzaga Bulldogs men's basketball team represented Gonzaga University in the 2004–05 NCAA Division I men's basketball season.

== Preseason ==
=== Departures ===
Name	Number	Pos.	Height	Weight	Year	Hometown	Reason for departure
Richard Fox	34	C	6'11"	265	Senior (Redshirt)	Denver, CO	Graduated
Kyle Bankhead	20	G	6'0"	195	Senior (Redshirt)	Walla Walla, WA	Graduated
Tony Skinner	4	G	6'5"	198	Senior	Albuquerque, NM	Graduated
Blake Stepp	10	G	6'4"	194	Senior	Eugene, OR	Graduated; Entered 2004 NBA draft
Cory Violette	33	F	6'8"	265	Senior	Boise, ID	Graduated

=== Incoming transfers ===
Name	Pos.	Height	Weight	Year	Hometown	Previous School	Years Remaining	Date Eligible
J.P. Batista	F	6'9"	269	Junior (Reshirt)	Pernambuco, Brazil	Barton County CC	2	Oct. 1, 2004

=== 2004 Recruiting Class ===
College recruiting information
Name	Hometown	School	Height	Weight	Commit date
David Pendergraft; G	Brewster, WA	Brewster	6 ft 6 in (1.98 m)	218 lb (99 kg)	Nov 7, 2002
David Pendergraft; G	Recruit ratings: Scout: Rivals:				
Josh Heytvelt; F	Clarkston, WA	Clarkston	6 ft 11 in (2.11 m)	217 lb (98 kg)	Jun 5, 2003
Josh Heytvelt; F	Recruit ratings: Scout: Rivals:				
Pierre Marie Altidor-Cespedes; G	Montreal, QC	St. Champlain St.-Lambert	6 ft 0 in (1.83 m)	181 lb (82 kg)	Sep 1, 2003
Pierre Marie Altidor-Cespedes; G	Recruit ratings: Scout: Rivals:				
Overall recruit ranking: Scout: NR Rivals: NR ESPN: NR
Note: In many cases, Scout, Rivals, 247Sports, On3, and ESPN may conflict in their listings of height and weight.; In these cases, the average was taken. ESPN grades are on a 100-point scale.; Sources: "2004 Gonzaga Rivals Commits". Rivals.; "2004 Gonzaga Scout Commits". Scout.; "2004 Gonzaga ESPN Commits". ESPN.; "Scout.com Team Recruiting Rankings". Scout.; "2004 Team Ranking". Rivals.; "2004–05 Gonzaga Bulldogs men's basketball team". 247Sports.

== Roster ==
2004–05 Gonzaga Bulldogs men's basketball team
Players
Coaches

Pos.	#	Name	Height	Weight	Year	Previous school	Hometown
G	14	Brian Michaelson	6 ft 4 in (1.93 m)	196 lb (89 kg)	RS Sr	Jesuit	Portland, OR
F	1	Ronny Turiaf	6 ft 10 in (2.08 m)	249 lb (113 kg)	Sr	INSEP	Le Robert, Martinique
C	13	J.P. Batista	6 ft 9 in (2.06 m)	269 lb (122 kg)	RS Jr	Colegio Atual; Western Nebraska CC; Barton County CC	Pernambuco, Brazil
G	11	Nathan Doudney	6 ft 4 in (1.93 m)	208 lb (94 kg)	RS Jr	Rockwall; Texas Tech	Rockwall, TX
G	22	Erroll Knight	6 ft 7 in (2.01 m)	211 lb (96 kg)	RS Jr	Chief Sealth; Washington	Seattle, WA
G	15	Colin Floyd (W)	6 ft 1 in (1.85 m)	201 lb (91 kg)	RS Jr	Sprague-Harrington	Harrington, WA
G	24	Stephen Gentry (W)	6 ft 2 in (1.88 m)	175 lb (79 kg)	RS Jr	Fort Scott	Fort Scott, KS
F	32	Sean Mallon	6 ft 9 in (2.06 m)	218 lb (99 kg)	RS So	Ferris	Spokane, WA
F	3	Adam Morrison	6 ft 8 in (2.03 m)	205 lb (93 kg)	So	Mead	Spokane, WA
G	5	Derek Raivio	6 ft 3 in (1.91 m)	168 lb (76 kg)	So	Mountain View	Vancouver, WA
C	33	Calum MacLeod	7 ft 1 in (2.16 m)	228 lb (103 kg)	RS Fr	Hutt Valley	Wellington, New Zealand
G	25	David Pendergraft	6 ft 6 in (1.98 m)	218 lb (99 kg)	Fr	Brewster	Brewster, WA
G	4	Pierre Marie Altidor-Cespedes	6 ft 0 in (1.83 m)	181 lb (82 kg)	Fr	St. Champlain St.-Lambert	Montreal, QC
F	42	Josh Heytvelt (redshirt)	6 ft 11 in (2.11 m)	217 lb (98 kg)	Fr	Clarkston	Clarkston, WA

Head coach

- Mark Few

Assistant coach(es)

- Bill Grier
- Leon Rice
- Tommy Lloyd

Legend

- (C) Team captain
- (S) Suspended
- (I) Ineligible
- (W) Walk-on
- Injured
- Current redshirt

Roster
Last update: 2010-3-14

== Schedule ==
Date time, TV	Rank^{#}	Opponent^{#}	Result	Record	Site (attendance) city, state
Regular season
11/19/2004*; 4:00 pm, KHQ-TV	No. 25	Portland State	W 98–80	1–0	McCarthey Athletic Center (6,000); Spokane, WA
11/21/2004*; 2:00 pm, KHQ	No. 25	Montana	W 88–76	2–0	McCarthey Athletic Center (5,917); Spokane, WA
11/24/2004*; 8:00 pm, KAYU	No. 24	Idaho	W 88–74	3–0	McCarthey Athletic Center (6,000); Spokane, WA
11/27/2004*; 10:00 am, KHQ	No. 24	vs. No. 5 Illinois; Wooden Tradition	L 72–89	3–1	Conseco Fieldhouse (14,183); Indianapolis, IN
12/01/2004*; 5:00 pm, KHQ		No. 14 Washington	W 99–87	4–1	McCarthey Athletic Center (6,000); Spokane, WA
12/04/2004*; 1:00 pm, CSTV		vs. UMass; Battle in Seattle	W 68–57	5–1	KeyArena (10,126); Seattle, WA
12/07/2004*; 6:00 pm, FSN	No. 25	at Washington State	W 54–52	6–1	Beasley Coliseum (8,151); Pullman, WA
12/11/2004*; 6:00 pm, KHQ	No. 25	Saint Louis	W 75–45	7–1	McCarthey Athletic Center (6,000); Spokane, WA
12/18/2004*; 9:00 am, ESPN	No. 22	vs. No. 3 Georgia Tech; Las Vegas Showdown	W 85–73	8–1	Thomas & Mack Center (16,042); Las Vegas, NV
12/21/2004*; 6:00 pm, KHQ	No. 13	Eastern Washington	W 83–70	9–1	Spokane Arena (12,000); Spokane, WA
12/2/2004*; 6:00 pm, ESPN2	No. 12	vs. No. 3 Oklahoma State; All-College Basketball Classic	W 78–75	10–1	Ford Center (18,202); Oklahoma City, OK
12/30/2004*; 5:00 pm, ESPN2	No. 12	at Missouri	L 61–63	10–2	Mizzou Arena (14,675); Columbia, MO
01/06/2005; 8:00 pm, ESPN2	No. 11	at Santa Clara	W 91–87	11–2 (1–0)	Leavey Center (4,500); Santa Clara, CA
01/08/2005; 8:00 pm, FSN	No. 11	at St. Mary's	L 81–89	11–3 (1–1)	McKeon Pavilion (3,500); Moraga, CA
01/13/2005; 7:00 pm, KAYU	No. 16	Loyola Marymount	W 76–65	12–3 (2–1)	McCarthey Athletic Center (6,000); Spokane, WA
01/15/2005; 5:00 pm, KHQ	No. 16	Pepperdine	W 86–62	13–3 (3–1)	McCarthey Athletic Center (6,000); Spokane, WA
01/20/2005; 7:00 pm, KAYU	No. 11	at San Francisco	L 75–84	13–4 (3–2)	War Memorial Gymnasium (5,300); San Francisco, CA
01/22/2005; 4:00 pm, KHQ	No. 11	at San Diego	W 68–56	14–4 (4–2)	Jenny Craig Pavilion (4,917); San Diego, CA
01/29/2005; 8:00 pm, ESPN2	No. 17	Portland	W 91–79	15–4 (5–2)	McCarthey Athletic Center (6,000); Spokane, WA
02/03/2005; 5:00 pm, KHQ	No. 17	St. Mary's	W 68–63	16–4 (6–2)	McCarthey Athletic Center (6,000); Spokane, WA
02/05/2005; 3:00 pm, KHQ	No. 17	Santa Clara	W 92–75	17–4 (7–2)	McCarthey Athletic Center (6,000); Spokane, WA
02/10/2005; 8:00 pm, ESPN2	No. 14	at Pepperdine	W 82–75	18–4 (8–2)	Firestone Fieldhouse (3,250); Malibu, CA
02/12/2005; 6:00 pm, KHQ	No. 14	at Loyola Marymount	W 61–58	19–4 (9–2)	Gersten Pavilion (4,337); Los Angeles, CA
02/17/2005; 6:00 pm, KHQ	No. 13	San Diego	W 90–73	20–4 (10–2)	McCarthey Athletic Center (6,000); Spokane, WA
02/19/2005; 3:00 pm, ABC	No. 13	San Francisco	W 75–73	21–4 (11–2)	McCarthey Athletic Center (6,000); Spokane, WA
02/24/2005; 8:00 pm, ESPN2	No. 12	Portland	W 84–68	22–4 (12–2)	Chiles Center (5,000); Portland, OR
02/28/2005; 6:00 pm, KHQ	No. 12	Northern Colorado	W 87–60	23–4	McCarthey Athletic Center (6,000); Spokane, WA
WCC Tournament
03/06/2005; 6:00 pm, ESPN2	(1) No. 12	vs. (4) San Diego; Semifinals	W 90–74	24–4	Leavey Center; Santa Clara, CA
03/07/2005; 8:00 pm, ESPN	(1) No. 11	vs. (3) St. Mary's; Championship	W 80–67	25–4	Leavey Center (4,500); Santa Clara, CA
NCAA tournament
03/17/2005*; 4:20 pm, CBS	(3W) No. 10	vs. (14W) Winthrop; Round of 64	W 74–64	26–4	McKale Center (13,751); Tucson, AZ
03/19/2005*; 11:10 am, CBS	(3W) No. 10	vs. (6W) No. 24 Texas Tech; Round of 32	L 69–71	26–5	McKale Center (13,751); Tucson, AZ
*Non-conference game. ^{#}Rankings from AP poll. (#) Tournament seedings in parentheses. All times are in Pacific time.
