= Gonzaga–Washington men's basketball rivalry =

American college basketball rivalry

- Gonzaga Bulldogs Washington Huskies
- Sport: Basketball
- First meeting: February 14, 1910; Washington 23, Gonzaga 14
- Latest meeting: December 9, 2023; Washington 78, Gonzaga 73
- Next meeting: TBA

Statistics
- Total meetings: 49
- All-time series: Washington leads, 30–19
- Largest victory: Washington, 59–11 (1921)
- Longest win streak: Washington, 9 (1944–1979)
- Current win streak: Washington, 1 (2023–present)

Locations of Gonzaga and Washington

The Gonzaga–Washington's men's basketball rivalry is a cross-state college basketball rivalry between the Gonzaga Bulldogs of Gonzaga University in Spokane, Washington and the Washington Huskies of the University of Washington in Seattle, Washington.

== Series overview ==
Gonzaga and Washington have met a total of 49 times dating back to 1910.

Gonzaga was admitted to the Northwest Conference in December 1923; the teams met a single time in conference play before the conference collapsed in late 1925.

The Huskies dominated the series up until the end of the 20th century, but Gonzaga has won 14 of the last 16 meetings, dating back to 1998. The Huskies hold a 19–7 lead in Seattle, Gonzaga leads the series 12–11 in Spokane, and the Zags own a 1–0 record in neutral locations, but they have never met in any postseason tournaments.

== Hiatus ==
Washington and Gonzaga met 11 times between 1995 and 2006, including a true home-and-home series annually from 1997 until 2006, but then Washington cancelled the series. Gonzaga was dominating the series, ascending from a Cinderalla in the 1999 NCAA Tournament to regular in the top 25 polls and the NCAA Tournament every year. Bad blood surfaced between the schools with Huskies assistant coach Cameron Dollar breaking NCAA rules while recruiting Josh Heytvelt, who ended up signing with the Zags. In 2009, Lorenzo Romar and his Washington staff proposed a series three games in a row at KeyArena in Seattle, but Gonzaga head coach Mark Few took insult to that, retorting with "the chances of that happening are about the same as Bigfoot having my baby. That's like me saying, Gonzaga proposes a five-year deal at Spokane Arena. There, I just made a proposal. That's as logical as this deal [would be]."

== Renewal ==
In 2014, Washington State Senator Michael Baumgartner proposed a bill that would require Gonzaga and Washington to play once a year in men's basketball. Later in the year, it was announced that the dormant rivalry between the Huskies and the Bulldogs would be renewed with a 4-year home-and-home series beginning in the 2016–17 season and running through the 2019–20 season. A year later, with Gonzaga and Washington both among the field of the 2015 Battle 4 Atlantis Thanksgiving week basketball tournament, they were selected to play each other in the opening round of the tournament, ending the rivalry drought at 9 years. In 2019, The Zags and Huskies extended their home-and-home series from the 2020–21 season through the 2023–24 season, starting in Spokane.

== Game results ==
Below is a complete list of series results, according to Sports Reference and GoHuskies.com. Rankings are from the AP Poll at the time of the game.

Gonzaga victories	Washington victories

No.	Date	Location	Winner	Score
1	1910	Spokane, WA	Washington	23–14
2	1912	Spokane, WA	Washington	37–17
3	1913	Spokane, WA	Washington	37–20
4	1921	Seattle, WA	Washington	59–11
5	1923	Spokane, WA	Washington	48–20
6	1925*	Spokane, WA	Washington	40–23
7	1926	Seattle, WA	Washington	35–12
8	1926	Spokane, WA	Gonzaga	30–24
9	1926	Spokane, WA	Washington	52–12
10	1927	Seattle, WA	Washington	44–18
11	1930	Seattle, WA	Washington	35–21
12	1930	Seattle, WA	Washington	42–11
13	1930	Spokane, WA	Washington	24–22
14	1930	Spokane, WA	Washington	28–17
15	1931	Seattle, WA	Washington	33–25
16	1935	Seattle, WA	Washington	57–40
17	1942	Spokane, WA	Washington	62–41
18	1943	Spokane, WA	Gonzaga	48–44
19	1943	Spokane, WA	Gonzaga	76–39
20	1944	Seattle, WA	Gonzaga	49–41
21	1944	Seattle, WA	Washington	53–40
22	1944	Spokane, WA	Washington	59–48
23	1944	Spokane, WA	Washington	78–47
24	1945	Seattle, WA	Washington	37–30
25	1945	Seattle, WA	Washington	39–29
26	1971	Seattle, WA	Washington	86–78

No.	Date	Location	Winner	Score
27	1972	Seattle, WA	Washington	93–61
28	1973	Seattle, WA	Washington	75–53
29	1979	Seattle, WA	Washington	63–59
30	1981	Spokane, WA	Gonzaga	73–69
31	1982	Seattle, WA	Washington	49–48
32	1995	Seattle, WA	Washington	62–58
33	1997	Seattle, WA	Washington	88–82
34	1998	Spokane, WA	Gonzaga	82–71
35	1999	Seattle, WA	#24 Gonzaga	76–66
36	2000	Spokane, WA	Gonzaga	86–74
37	2001	Seattle, WA	#25 Gonzaga	67–47
38	2002	Spokane, WA	#20 Gonzaga	95–89^{OT}
39	2003	Seattle, WA	#17 Gonzaga	86–62
40	2004	Spokane, WA	Gonzaga	99–87
41	2005	Seattle, WA	#18 Washington	99–95
42	2006	Spokane, WA	#18 Gonzaga	97–77
43	2015	Nassau, Bahamas	#10 Gonzaga	80–64
44	2016	Spokane, WA	#8 Gonzaga	98–71
45	2017	Seattle, WA	#12 Gonzaga	97–70
46	2018	Spokane, WA	#1 Gonzaga	81–79
47	2019	Seattle, WA	#9 Gonzaga	83–76
48	2022	Spokane, WA	#18 Gonzaga	77–60
49	2023	Seattle, WA	Washington	78–73
Series: Washington leads 30–19 * Northwest Conference game
