= Gonzaga–Saint Mary's men's basketball rivalry =

American college basketball rivalry

- Gonzaga Bulldogs Saint Mary's Gaels
- Sport: Basketball
- First meeting: December 17, 1955; Gonzaga 94, Saint Mary's 77
- Latest meeting: February 28, 2026; Saint Mary's 70, #9 Gonzaga 59

Statistics
- Total meetings: 121
- All-time series: Gonzaga leads, 83–38
- Largest victory: Gonzaga, 54 (2001)
- Longest win streak: Gonzaga, 17 (1999–2004)
- Current win streak: Saint Mary's, 1 (2026–present)

Locations of Gonzaga and Saint Mary's

The Gonzaga–Saint Mary's men's basketball rivalry is an intra-West Coast Conference college basketball rivalry between the Saint Mary's Gaels men's basketball team of Saint Mary's College of California in Moraga, California and the Gonzaga Bulldogs men's basketball team of Gonzaga University in Spokane, Washington. Many analysts and members of the media have touted the Gaels vs. Zags as one of the best, if not the best, college basketball rivalry on the West Coast; both teams have been consistently two of the top three teams in the West Coast Conference over the last two decades. Gonzaga and Saint Mary's have combined to win 27 out of the last 31 conference championship games, including each of the last 17.

The two teams have met a total of 121 times dating back to 1955 and currently meet biannually as a part of WCC conference play, with the potential to play a third game in the WCC tournament and a fourth in the postseason. As of March 2025, they have met 23 times in the WCC Tournament but have never met in any postseason tournaments beyond the end of conference play. Saint Mary's has upset a number 1 ranked Zags squad twice – once in the 2019 WCC final as an unranked team and once in 2022 as #23 in Moraga.

The future of the rivalry is uncertain as Gonzaga accepted an invitation on October 1, 2024, to join the Pac-12 Conference, effective July 1, 2026.

== Game results ==
Below is a complete list of series results, according to Sports Reference and GoZags.com.

Gonzaga victories	Saint Mary’s victories	Tie games

No.	Date	Location	Winner	Score
1	1955	Spokane, WA	Gonzaga	94–77
2	1971	Moraga, CA	Gonzaga	86–84
3	1976	Moraga, CA	Saint Mary’s	82–80
4	1977	Spokane, WA	Saint Mary’s	82–73
5	1980	Moraga, CA	Saint Mary’s	91–79
6	1980	Spokane, WA	Gonzaga	73–72
7	1981	Moraga, CA	Gonzaga	59–50
8	1981	Spokane, WA	Gonzaga	64–63
9	1982	Moraga, CA	Gonzaga	61–58^{OT}
10	1982	Spokane, WA	Gonzaga	75–73^{2OT}
11	1983	Moraga, CA	Saint Mary’s	59–50
12	1983	Spokane, WA	Saint Mary’s	51–46
13	1984	Moraga, CA	Saint Mary’s	52–51
14	1984	Spokane, WA	Saint Mary’s	72–70
15	1985	Spokane, WA	Gonzaga	57–55
16	1985	Moraga, CA	Saint Mary’s	67–53
17	1986	Moraga, CA	Gonzaga	79–61
18	1986	Spokane, WA	Gonzaga	77–67
19	1987	Spokane, WA	Gonzaga	70–51
20	1987	Moraga, CA	Saint Mary’s	49–48
21	1988	Spokane, WA	Saint Mary’s	77–64
22	1988	Moraga, CA	Saint Mary’s	72–63
23	1989	Moraga, CA	Saint Mary’s	67–45
24	1989	Spokane, WA	#19 Saint Mary’s	67–63^{OT}
25	1990	Spokane, WA	Saint Mary’s	61–53
26	1990	Moraga, CA	Gonzaga	75–62
27	1991	Moraga, CA	Saint Mary’s	83–75
28	1991	Spokane, WA	Gonzaga	73–69
29	1992	Spokane, WA	Gonzaga	69–65^{OT}
30	1992	Moraga, CA	Saint Mary’s	65–57
31	1993	Moraga, CA	Gonzaga	82–64
32	1993	Spokane, WA	Gonzaga	79–55
33	1994	Moraga, CA	Gonzaga	72–69
34	1994	Spokane, WA	Gonzaga	88–78
35	1995	Spokane, WA	Saint Mary’s	68–63
36	1995	Moraga, CA	Saint Mary’s	73–66
37	1995	Santa Clara, CA	Gonzaga	69–59
38	1996	Moraga, CA	Gonzaga	81–71
39	1996	Spokane, WA	Gonzaga	83–82^{OT}
40	1996	Santa Clara, CA	Gonzaga	64–54
41	1997	Spokane, WA	Gonzaga	80–57
42	1997	Moraga, CA	Saint Mary’s	74–72
43	1998	Spokane, WA	Gonzaga	102–73
44	1998	Moraga, CA	Saint Mary’s	76–73
45	1999	Moraga, CA	Gonzaga	78–70
46	1999	Spokane, WA	Gonzaga	97–52
47	1999	Santa Clara, CA	Gonzaga	70–57
48	2000	Moraga, CA	Gonzaga	90–60
49	2000	Spokane, WA	Gonzaga	93–66
50	2000	Santa Clara, CA	Gonzaga	76–49
51	2001	Moraga, CA	Gonzaga	102–48
52	2001	Spokane, WA	Gonzaga	90–64
53	2001	San Diego, CA	Gonzaga	105–65
54	2002	Spokane, WA	#16 Gonzaga	70–52
55	2002	Moraga, CA	#7 Gonzaga	74–55
56	2003	Moraga, CA	Gonzaga	56–53
57	2003	Spokane, WA	Gonzaga	73–49
58	2003	San Diego, CA	Gonzaga	73–52
59	2004	Spokane, WA	#16 Gonzaga	75–61
60	2004	Moraga, CA	#7 Gonzaga	79–60
61	2004	Santa Clara, CA	#4 Gonzaga	84–71

No.	Date	Location	Winner	Score
62	2005	Moraga, CA	Saint Mary’s	89–81
63	2005	Spokane, WA	#17 Gonzaga	68–63
64	2005	Santa Clara, CA	#12 Gonzaga	80–67
65	2006	Moraga, CA	#8 Gonzaga	68–60
66	2006	Spokane, WA	#5 Gonzaga	62–61
67	2007	Moraga, CA	Saint Mary’s	80–75
68	2007	Spokane, WA	Gonzaga	60–49
69	2008	Moraga, CA	#25 Saint Mary’s	89–85^{OT}
70	2008	Spokane, WA	#24 Gonzaga	88–76
71	2009	Spokane, WA	#20 Gonzaga	69–62
72	2009	Moraga, CA	#19 Gonzaga	72–70
73	2009	Paradise, NV	#12 Gonzaga	83–58
74	2010	Moraga, CA	#17 Gonzaga	89–82
75	2010	Spokane, WA	#16 Gonzaga	80–61
76	2010	Paradise, NV	Saint Mary’s	81–62
77	2011	Spokane, WA	Saint Mary’s	73–71
78	2011	Moraga, CA	Gonzaga	89–85^{OT}
79	2011	Paradise, NV	Gonzaga	75–63
80	2012	Moraga, CA	Saint Mary’s	83–62
81	2012	Spokane, WA	Gonzaga	73–59
82	2012	Paradise, NV	Saint Mary’s	78–74
83	2013	Spokane, WA	#9 Gonzaga	83–78
84	2013	Moraga, CA	#5 Gonzaga	77–60
85	2013	Paradise, NV	#1 Gonzaga	65–51
86	2014	Spokane, WA	#24 Gonzaga	73–51
87	2014	Moraga, CA	Gonzaga	75–47
88	2014	Paradise, NV	Gonzaga	70–54
89	2015	Spokane, WA	#3 Gonzaga	68–47
90	2015	Moraga, CA	#3 Gonzaga	70–60
91	2016	Moraga, CA	Saint Mary’s	70–67
92	2016	Spokane, WA	Saint Mary’s	63–58
93	2016	Paradise, NV	Gonzaga	85–75
94	2017	Spokane, WA	#5 Gonzaga	79–56
95	2017	Moraga, CA	#1 Gonzaga	74–64
96	2017	Paradise, NV	#4 Gonzaga	74–56
97	2018	Spokane, WA	Saint Mary’s	74–71
98	2018	Moraga, CA	#12 Gonzaga	78–66
99	2019	Spokane, WA	#4 Gonzaga	94–46
100	2019	Moraga, CA	#1 Gonzaga	69–55
101	2019	Paradise, NV	Saint Mary’s	60–47
102	2020	Moraga, CA	#2 Gonzaga	90–60
103	2020	Spokane, WA	#3 Gonzaga	86–76
104	2020	Paradise, NV	#2 Gonzaga	84–66
105	2021	Moraga, CA	#1 Gonzaga	73–59
106	2021	Spokane, WA	#1 Gonzaga	87–65
107	2021	Paradise, NV	#1 Gonzaga	78–55
108	2022	Spokane, WA	#1 Gonzaga	74–58
109	2022	Moraga, CA	#23 Saint Mary’s	67–57
110	2022	Paradise, NV	#1 Gonzaga	82–69
111	2023	Moraga, CA	#18 Saint Mary’s	78–70^{OT}
112	2023	Spokane, WA	#12 Gonzaga	77–68
113	2023	Paradise, NV	#9 Gonzaga	77–51
114	2024	Spokane, WA	Saint Mary’s	64–62
115	2024	Moraga, CA	#23 Gonzaga	70–57
116	2024	Paradise, NV	#21 Saint Mary’s	69–60
117	2025	Moraga, CA	Saint Mary’s	62–58
118	2025	Spokane, WA	Saint Mary’s	74–67
119	2025	Paradise, NV	Gonzaga	58–51
120	2026	Spokane, WA	#6 Gonzaga	73–65
121	2026	Moraga, CA	Saint Mary’s	70–59
Series: Gonzaga leads 83–38
