= 2011–12 Euroleague Regular Season Group B =

Standings and Results for Group B of the Regular Season phase of the 2011–12 Euroleague basketball tournament.

== Standings ==
Key to colors
| Top four places in each group advance to Top 16 |

| | Team | Pld | W | L | PF | PA | Diff | Tie-break |
|---|---|---|---|---|---|---|---|---|
| 1. | (Russia) CSKA Moscow | 10 | 10 | 0 | 870 | 729 | +141 | |
| 2. | (Greece) Panathinaikos | 10 | 7 | 3 | 834 | 739 | +95 | |
| 3. | (Spain) Unicaja Málaga | 10 | 4 | 6 | 791 | 808 | −17 | 1−1 (+5) |
| 4. | (Lithuania) Žalgiris | 10 | 4 | 6 | 763 | 812 | −49 | 1−1 (−5) |
| 5. | (Germany) Brose | 10 | 3 | 7 | 773 | 794 | −21 | |
| 6. | (Croatia) Zagreb | 10 | 2 | 8 | 718 | 867 | −149 | |

== Fixtures and results ==
All times given below are in Central European Time.

=== Game 1 ===
17 October 2011
20:45

Report

| Žalgiris (Lithuania) | 74–87 | (Russia) CSKA Moscow |
Scoring by quarter: 16–25, 15–19, 21–23, 22–20
| Pts: Collins 18; Rebs: Weems 6 Asts: Collins 4 | | Pts: Shved 19; Rebs: Kirilenko 15; Asts: Teodosić 8 |

Žalgiris Arena, Kaunas
Attendance: 15,000
Referees: Christos Christodoulou (GRE), Olegs Latisevs (LAT), Milija Vojinovic (SRB)

20 October 2011
20:45

Report

| Panathinaikos (Greece) | 98–77 | (Spain) Unicaja Málaga |
Scoring by quarter: 25–16, 27–33, 25–12, 21–16
| Pts: Diamantidis 17; Rebs: Sato 6 Asts: Diamantidis 7 | | Pts: Valters, Perić 13; Rebs: Sinanović 8 Asts: Rodríguez, Valters 2 |

Olympic Indoor Hall, Athens
Attendance: 6,500
Referees: Grzegorz Ziemblicki (POL), Robert Vyklicky (CZE), Radomir Vojinovic (MNE)

20 October 2011
21:00

Report

| Brose (Germany) | 96–65 | (Croatia) Zagreb |
Scoring by quarter: 26–16, 26–14, 28–20, 16–15
| Pts: Tucker 20; Rebs: Slaughter 10; Asts: Roberts 6 | | Pts: Simon 14; Rebs: May 9 Asts: three players 3 |

Stechert Arena, Bamberg
Attendance: 6,800
Referees: Juan Carlos Garcia Gonzalez (ESP), Tomas Jasevicius (LTU), Anastasios Piloidis (GRE)

=== Game 2 ===
25 October 2011
20:45

Report

| Unicaja Málaga (Spain) | 85–78 | (Lithuania) Žalgiris |
Scoring by quarter: 22–19, 8–20, 19–13, 18–15
| Pts: Freeland 21; Rebs: Freeland, Žorić 12; Asts: Valters 7 | | Pts: Weems 21; Rebs: Lawson, Javtokas 9 Asts: Kalnietis, Delininkaitis 3 |

Jose Maria Martin Carpena Arena, Málaga
Attendance: 7,250
Referees: Sinisa Herceg (CRO), Enrico Sabetta (ITA), Renaud Geller (BEL)

26 October 2011
18:15

Report

| CSKA Moscow (Russia) | 94–74 | (Germany) Brose |
Scoring by quarter: 24–14, 23–16, 24–22, 23–22
| Pts: Krstić 19; Rebs: Vorontsevich 5 Asts: Kirilenko, Shved 6 | | Pts: Pleiß 17; Rebs: Tucker 6 Asts: Jacobsen 4 |

CSKA Universal Sports Hall, Moscow
Attendance: 4,351
Referees: Sradan Dozai (CRO), Seffi Shemmesh (ISR), Marko Juras (SRB)

26 October 2011
19:00

Report

| Zagreb (Croatia) | 62–81 | (Greece) Panathinaikos |
Scoring by quarter: 14–24, 8–21, 11–16, 29–20
| Pts: May 23; Rebs: May 9 Asts: Mulaomerović 3 | | Pts: Sato 12; Rebs: Sato 7 Asts: Diamantidis 8 |

Arena Zagreb, Zagreb
Attendance: 4,500
Referees: Jose Ramon Garcia Ortiz (ESP), Marek Ćmikiewicz (POL), Murat Biricik (TUR)

=== Game 3 ===
2 November 2011
20:45

Report

| Zagreb (Croatia) | 47–89 | (Russia) CSKA Moscow |
Scoring by quarter: 13–22, 11–23, 11–21, 12–23
| Pts: Simon 15; Rebs: Kasun 9 Asts: Garrett 3 | | Pts: Krstić 15; Rebs: Kirilenko 7 Asts: Shved 7 |

Arena Zagreb, Zagreb
Attendance: 2,000
Referees: Daniel Hierrezuelo (ESP), Tolga Sahin (ITA), Zdravko Rutesic (MNE)

3 November 2011
21:00

Report

| Brose (Germany) | 78–79 | (Spain) Unicaja Málaga |
Scoring by quarter: 27–22, 11–20, 23–21, 17–16
| Pts: Roberts, Slaughter 16; Rebs: Šuput, Slaughter 6 Asts: Roberts 4 | | Pts: Freeland 18; Rebs: Freeland, Žorić 7 Asts: Fitch 4 |

Stechert Arena, Bamberg
Attendance: 6,800
Referees: Guerrino Cerebuch (ITA), Sreten Radovic (CRO), Petri Mäntylä (FIN)

4 November 2011
20:45

Report

| Panathinaikos (Greece) | 92–75 | (Lithuania) Žalgiris |
Scoring by quarter: 25–21, 13–21, 26–13, 28–20
| Pts: Diamantidis 16; Rebs: Vougioukas 6 Asts: Calathes 7 | | Pts: Weems 21; Rebs: Lawson, Jankūnas 4 Asts: Lawson 4 |

Olympic Indoor Hall, Athens
Attendance: 10,000
Referees: Sasa Pukl (SLO), Emilio Perez Pizarro (ESP), Rustu Nuran (TUR)

=== Game 4 ===
9 November 2011
20:45

Report

| Unicaja Málaga (Spain) | 99–85 | (Croatia) Zagreb |
Scoring by quarter: 19–27, 30–14, 24–16, 26–28
| Pts: Žorić 14; Rebs: Perić, Freeland 6 Asts: Rodríguez, Rowland 4 | | Pts: Kasun 23; Rebs: Kasun 7 Asts: Mulaomerović 10 |

Jose Maria Martin Carpena Arena, Málaga
Attendance: 7,350
Referees: Milivoje Jovcic (SRB), Luis Lopes (POR), Marcin Kowalski (POL)

10 November 2011
18:45

Report

| Žalgiris (Lithuania) | 81–70 | (Germany) Brose |
Scoring by quarter: 28–21, 18–22, 14–10, 21–17
| Pts: Weems 22; Rebs: Raković, Weems 6 Asts: Kalnietis 5 | | Pts: Šuput 19; Rebs: Slaughter 8 Asts: Roberts 3 |

Žalgiris Arena, Kaunas
Attendance: 12,323
Referees: M. A. Perez Perez (ESP), Boris Shulga (UKR), Apostolos Kalpakas (SWE)

10 November 2011
21:00

Report

| Panathinaikos (Greece) | 76–78 (OT) | (Russia) CSKA Moscow |
Scoring by quarter: 22–19, 19–13, 16–22, 14–17, Overtime: 5–7
| Pts: Kaimakoglou 13; Rebs: Batiste, Calathes 6 Asts: Diamantidis 4 | | Pts: Šiškauskas 14; Rebs: Krstić 11; Asts: Khryapa 4 |

Olympic Indoor Hall, Athens
Attendance: 16,000
Referees: Luigi Lamonica (ITA), Matej Boltauzer (SVN), Roberto Chiari (ITA)

=== Game 5 ===
16 November 2011
18:15

Report

| CSKA Moscow (Russia) | 77–66 | (Spain) Unicaja Málaga |
Scoring by quarter: 12–14, 22–15, 28–12, 15–25
| Pts: Teodosić 19; Rebs: Kirilenko 9 Asts: Teodosić, Khryapa 4 | | Pts: Freeland 14; Rebs: Freeland 9 Asts: Rodríguez 3 |

CSKA Universal Sports Hall, Moscow
Attendance: 4,900
Referees: Ilija Belosevic (SRB), Tomas Jasevicius (LTU), Ioannis Foufis (GRE)

16 November 2011
20:45

Report

| Zagreb (Croatia) | 80–78 | (Lithuania) Žalgiris |
Scoring by quarter: 21–20, 19–16, 17–24, 23–18
| Pts: Simon 22; Rebs: Heytvelt 11; Asts: three players 3 | | Pts: Jankūnas 24; Rebs: Jankūnas 11; Asts: Lipkevičius 4 |

Arena Zagreb, Zagreb
Attendance: 2,000
Referees: Vicente Bulto (ESP), Seffi Shemmesh (ISR), Elias Koromilas (GRE)

17 November 2011
20:45

Report

| Brose (Germany) | 79–76 | (Greece) Panathinaikos |
Scoring by quarter: 16–19, 21–21, 23–19, 19–17
| Pts: Šuput 19; Rebs: Pleiß 9 Asts: Gavel, Jacobsen 4 | | Pts: Diamantidis 16; Rebs: Marić 6 Asts: Diamantidis 6 |

Stechert Arena, Bamberg
Attendance: 6,800
Referees: Carl Jungebrand (FIN), Tolga Sahin (ITA), Olegs Latisevs (LAT)

=== Game 6 ===
23 November 2011
18:15

Report

| CSKA Moscow (Russia) | 95–82 | (Lithuania) Žalgiris |
Scoring by quarter: 24–25, 27–20, 22–21, 22–16
| Pts: Krstić 21; Rebs: Krstić 7 Asts: Teodosić 7 | | Pts: Weems 22; Rebs: Javtokas 6 Asts: Kalnietis 6 |

CSKA Universal Sports Hall, Moscow
Attendance: 4,400
Referees: Sasa Pukl (SLO), Robert Lottermoser (GER), Marcin Kowalski (POL)

24 November 2011
20:45

Report

| Unicaja Málaga (Spain) | 76–77 | (Greece) Panathinaikos |
Scoring by quarter: 17–27, 26–18, 14–13, 19–19
| Pts: Žorić 21; Rebs: Darden 7 Asts: Valters 5 | | Pts: Diamantidis 23; Rebs: Sato, Smith 6 Asts: Calathes 5 |

Jose Maria Martin Carpena Arena, Málaga
Attendance: 9,000
Referees: Guerrino Cerebuch (ITA), Srdan Dozai (CRO), Tomasz Trawicki (POL)

24 November 2011
21:00

Report

| Zagreb (Croatia) | 86–74 | (Germany) Brose |
Scoring by quarter: 21–20, 15–14, 26–24, 24–16
| Pts: Heytvelt 25; Rebs: Simon, Heytvelt 12; Asts: Ford 10 | | Pts: Jacobsen 19; Rebs: Slaughter 10; Asts: Jacobsen 4 |

Dražen Petrović Basketball Hall, Zagreb
Attendance: 3,000
Referees: Emilio Perez Pizarro (ESP), Milija Vojinovic (SRB), Sergey Chebyshev (UKR)

=== Game 7 ===
30 November 2011
18:45

Report

| Žalgiris (Lithuania) | 67–65 | (Spain) Unicaja Málaga |
Scoring by quarter: 19–11, 16–13, 15–18, 17–23
| Pts: Weems 18; Rebs: Weems 11; Asts: Lawson 3 | | Pts: Fitch 15; Rebs: Freeland 9 Asts: Valters 6 |

Žalgiris Arena, Kaunas
Attendance: 12,415
Referees: Dubravko Muhvic (CRO), Marek Cmikiewicz (POL), Panagiotis Anastopoulos (GRE)

30 November 2011
20:45

Report

| Brose (Germany) | 78–81 | (Russia) CSKA Moscow |
Scoring by quarter: 18–25, 19–19, 25–23, 16–14
| Pts: Slaughter 21; Rebs: Tucker 6 Asts: Šuput 4 | | Pts: Krstić 20; Rebs: Khryapa 7 Asts: Teodosić, Khryapa 5 |

Stechert Arena, Bamberg
Attendance: 6,800
Referees: J.R. Garcia Ortiz (ESP), Jakub Zamojski (POL), Antonio Conde (ESP)

30 November 2011
21:00

Report

| Panathinaikos (Greece) | 94–76 | (Croatia) Zagreb |
Scoring by quarter: 24–22, 24–27, 23–13, 23–14
| Pts: Batiste 18; Rebs: Kaimakoglou 11; Asts: Diamantidis 5 | | Pts: Mulaomerović 18; Rebs: May 10; Asts: Simon 4 |

Olympic Indoor Hall, Athens
Attendance: 5,000
Referees: Recep Ankarali (TUR), Oliver Krause (GER), Aleksandar Milojevic (MKD)

=== Game 8 ===
7 December 2011
17:15

Report

| CSKA Moscow (Russia) | 87–74 | (Croatia) Zagreb |
Scoring by quarter: 18–23, 25–11, 17–24, 27–16
| Pts: Gordon 18; Rebs: Krstić 9 Asts: Voronov 5 | | Pts: Simon 21; Rebs: Heytvelt 5 Asts: Simon 5 |

CSKA Universal Sports Hall, Moscow
Attendance: 4,100
Referees: Grzegorz Ziemblicki (POL), Seffi Shemmesh (ISR), Damir Javor (SLO)

7 December 2011
18:45

Report

| Žalgiris (Lithuania) | 59–94 | (Greece) Panathinaikos |
Scoring by quarter: 14–13, 5–26, 19–24, 21–29
| Pts: Weems 16; Rebs: Weems 12; Asts: three players 3 | | Pts: Calathes, Smith 17; Rebs: Sato 8 Asts: Diamantidis, Calathes 4 |

Žalgiris Arena, Kaunas
Attendance: 14,212
Referees: Daniel Hierrezuelo (ESP), Sreten Radovic (CRO), Petri Mäntylä (FIN)

8 December 2011
19:00

Report

| Unicaja Málaga (Spain) | 79–90 | (Germany) Brose |
Scoring by quarter: 23–24, 17–22, 21–21, 18–23
| Pts: Rowland, Freeland 17; Rebs: Freeland 7 Asts: Rowland 5 | | Pts: Jenkins 23; Rebs: Tucker 13; Asts: Jenkins 5 |

Jose Maria Martin Carpena Arena, Málaga
Attendance: 9,000
Referees: Luigi Lamonica (ITA), Spiros Gkontas (GRE), Sergio Silva (POR)

=== Game 9 ===
14 December 2011
17:15

Report

| CSKA Moscow (Russia) | 91–75 | (Greece) Panathinaikos |
Scoring by quarter: 26–24, 21–25, 28–14, 16–12
| Pts: Krstić 17; Rebs: Krstić 12; Asts: Teodosić 10 | | Pts: Vougioukas 17; Rebs: Sato 9 Asts: Diamantidis 6 |

CSKA Universal Sports Hall, Moscow
Attendance: 5,000
Referees: Carl Jungebrand (FIN), M. A. Perez Perez (ESP), Tolga Sahin (ITA)

14 December 2011
20:45

Report

| Zagreb (Croatia) | 67–82 | (Spain) Unicaja Málaga |
Scoring by quarter: 22–20, 17–25, 13–20, 15–17
| Pts: Simon 16; Rebs: Simon 7 Asts: Babić, Rančić 3 | | Pts: Freeland 17; Rebs: Žorić, Freeland 8 Asts: Rowland 5 |

Arena Zagreb, Zagreb
Attendance: 3,000
Referees: Paolo Taurino (ITA), Jakub Zamojski (POL), Zdravko Rutesic (MNE)

15 December 2011
20:00

Report

| Brose (Germany) | 68–82 | (Lithuania) Žalgiris |
Scoring by quarter: 13–20, 17–24, 19–14, 19–24
| Pts: Šuput 16; Rebs: Tucker 12; Asts: Gavel 5 | | Pts: Kalnietis, Weems 14; Rebs: Jankūnas 14; Asts: Kalnietis 5 |

Stechert Arena, Bamberg
Attendance: 6,800
Referees: José Martín (ESP), Vicente Bulto (ESP), Nicola Maestre (FRA)

=== Game 10 ===
21 December 2011
20:00

Report

| Panathinaikos (Greece) | 71–66 | (Germany) Brose |
Scoring by quarter: 12–22, 18–16, 26–15, 15–13
| Pts: Diamantidis 14; Rebs: Kaimakoglou 10; Asts: Diamantidis, Calathes 3 | | Pts: Roberts, Šuput 11; Rebs: Pleiß 8 Asts: Tucker 3 |

Olympic Indoor Hall, Athens
Attendance: 6,000
Referees: Emilio Perez Pizarro (ESP), Dubravko Muhvic (CRO), Oscar Perea (ESP)

21 December 2011
20:00

Report

| Unicaja Málaga (Spain) | 83–91 | (Russia) CSKA Moscow |
Scoring by quarter: 23–22, 18–22, 22–27, 20–20
| Pts: three players 16; Rebs: Žorić 8 Asts: Fitch 5 | | Pts: Teodosić 18; Rebs: Kaun 9 Asts: Teodosić 10 |

Jose Maria Martin Carpena Arena, Málaga
Attendance: 7,300
Referees: Sasa Pukl (SLO), Fernando Rocha (POR), Elias Koromilas (GRE)

21 December 2011
20:00

Report

| Žalgiris (Lithuania) | 87–76 | (Croatia) Zagreb |
Scoring by quarter: 28–18, 18–11, 20–21, 21–26
| Pts: Weems 20; Rebs: Jankūnas 8 Asts: Kalnietis 7 | | Pts: Kasun 20; Rebs: Kasun 8 Asts: Mulaomerović, Rančić 4 |

Žalgiris Arena, Kaunas
Attendance: 14,547
Referees: Recep Ankarali (TUR), Sergey Chebyshev (UKR), Marius Ciulin (ROU)
