= 2005 West Coast Conference men's basketball tournament =

- Classification: Division I
- Season: 2004–05
- Teams: 8
- Site: Leavey Center; Santa Clara, California
- Champions: Gonzaga (7th title)
- Winning coach: Mark Few (5th title)
- MVP: Adam Morrison (Gonzaga)
- Television: ESPN2, ESPN

2004–05 West Coast Conference men's basketball standings
	Conf.				Overall
Team	W		L	PCT	W		L	PCT
No. 10 Gonzaga	12	–	2	.857	26	–	5	.839
Saint Mary's	11	–	3	.786	25	–	9	.735
Santa Clara	7	–	7	.500	15	–	16	.484
San Diego	7	–	7	.500	16	–	13	.552
Pepperdine	6	–	8	.429	17	–	14	.548
San Francisco	6	–	8	.429	17	–	14	.548
Portland	4	–	10	.286	15	–	15	.500
Loyola Marymount	3	–	11	.214	11	–	17	.393
† 2005 WCC tournament winner Rankings from AP Poll

The 2005 West Coast Conference men's basketball tournament took place March 4–7, 2005. All rounds were held in Santa Clara, California at the Leavey Center. The semifinals were televised by ESPN2. The West Coast Conference Championship Game was televised by ESPN.

The Gonzaga Bulldogs earned their seventh WCC Tournament title and an automatic bid to the 2005 NCAA tournament. Adam Morrison of Gonzaga was named Tournament MVP.

== Bracket ==
First round Friday, March 4
5	Pepperdine	91
8	Loyola Marymount	79
6	San Francisco	65
7	Portland	60

Quarter finals Saturday, March 5
4	San Diego	86
5	Pepperdine	80
3	Santa Clara	67
6	San Francisco	60

Semi-finals; Sunday, March 6
1	#12 Gonzaga	90
4	San Diego	74
2	Saint Mary's	69
3	Santa Clara	64

Finals; Monday, March 7
1	#12 Gonzaga	80
2	Saint Mary's	67

== See also ==
- West Coast Conference
