= List of College GameDay (basketball TV program) locations =

This is a list of locations from which ESPN's College GameDay has been broadcast.

== 2004–05 men's season ==
Date	Visitor		Host		City	Location	Notes
January 22	21 Pittsburgh Panthers	76	14 UConn Huskies	66	Storrs, Connecticut	Harry A. Gampel Pavilion	
January 29	16 Texas Longhorns	65	6 Kansas Jayhawks	90	Lawrence, Kansas	Allen Fieldhouse	
February 5	Notre Dame Fighting Irish	57	8 Syracuse Orange	60	Syracuse, New York	Carrier Dome	
February 12	7 Duke Blue Devils	92	Maryland Terrapins	99	College Park, Maryland	Comcast Center	Rivalry
February 19	Mississippi State Bulldogs	78	5 Kentucky Wildcats	94	Lexington, Kentucky	Rupp Arena	
February 26	11 Louisville Cardinals	53	Memphis Tigers	44	Memphis, Tennessee	FedEx Forum	
March 5	Texas Longhorns	74	8 Oklahoma State Cowboys	73	Stillwater, Oklahoma	Gallagher-Iba Arena	
March 12	Georgia Tech Yellow Jackets	78	2 North Carolina Tar Heels	75	Washington, D.C.	MCI Center	ACC Tournament
March 12	North Carolina State Wolfpack	69	5 Duke Blue Devils	76	Washington, D.C.	MCI Center	ACC Tournament

== 2005–06 men's season ==
Date	Visitor		Host		City	Location	Notes
January 21	3 UConn Huskies	71	17 Louisville Cardinals	58	Louisville, Kentucky	Freedom Hall	
January 28	4 Texas Longhorns	72	24 Oklahoma Sooners	82	Norman, Oklahoma	Lloyd Noble Center	
February 4	Kentucky Wildcats	80	8 Florida Gators	95	Gainesville, Florida	O'Connell Center	Rivalry
February 11	Stanford Cardinal	76	5 Gonzaga Bulldogs	80	Spokane, Washington	McCarthey Athletic Center	
February 18	Louisville Cardinals	66	5 Syracuse Orange	79	Syracuse, New York	Carrier Dome	
February 25	16 Kansas Jayhawks	55	7 Texas Longhorns	80	Austin, Texas	Frank Erwin Center	
March 4	13 North Carolina Tar Heels	83	1 Duke Blue Devils	76	Durham, North Carolina	Cameron Indoor Stadium	Rivalry
March 11	Nebraska Cornhuskers	65	17 Kansas Jayhawks	79	Dallas, Texas	American Airlines Center	Big 12 Tournament
March 11	Texas A&M Aggies	70	8 Texas Longhorns	74	Dallas, Texas	American Airlines Center	Big 12 Tournament

== 2006–07 men's season ==
Date	Visitor		Host		City	Location	Notes
January 6	18 UConn Huskies	49	14 LSU Tigers	66	Baton Rouge, Louisiana	Pete Maravich Assembly Center	
January 13	Georgetown Hoyas	69	7 Pittsburgh Panthers	74	Pittsburgh, Pennsylvania	Petersen Events Center	
January 20	Georgia Tech Yellow Jackets	61	4 North Carolina Tar Heels	77	Chapel Hill, North Carolina	Dean Smith Center	
January 27	Michigan State Spartans	64	5 Ohio State Buckeyes	66	Columbus, Ohio	Value City Arena	
February 3	10 Texas A&M Aggies	69	6 Kansas Jayhawks	66	Lawrence, Kansas	Allen Fieldhouse	
February 10	1 Florida Gators	64	18 Kentucky Wildcats	61	Lexington, Kentucky	Show held on Rupp Arena rooftop	Rivalry
February 17	4 North Carolina Tar Heels	77	21 Boston College Eagles	72	Chestnut Hill, Massachusetts	Conte Forum	
February 24	Indiana Hoosiers	58	Michigan State Spartans	66	East Lansing, Michigan	Breslin Center	
March 3	12 Pittsburgh Panthers	69	20 Marquette Golden Eagles	75	Milwaukee, Wisconsin	Bradley Center	
March 10	None				Bristol, Connecticut	ESPN studios	Championship Week
March 31	(2) Georgetown Hoyas	60	(1) Ohio State Buckeyes	67	Atlanta, Georgia	Georgia Dome	Final Four
March 31	(2) UCLA Bruins	66	(1) Florida Gators	76	Atlanta, Georgia	Georgia Dome	Final Four
April 2	(1) Ohio State Buckeyes	75	(1) Florida Gators	84	Atlanta, Georgia	Georgia Dome	National Championship Game

== 2007–08 men's season ==
Date	Visitor		Host		City	Location	Notes
January 19	Kentucky Wildcats	70	Florida Gators	81^{OT}	Gainesville, Florida	O'Connell Center	Rivalry
January 26	Creighton Bluejays	44	Southern Illinois Salukis	48	Carbondale, Illinois	SIU Arena	
February 2	Arizona Wildcats	60	5 UCLA Bruins	82	Los Angeles, California	Pauley Pavilion	Rivalry
February 9	6 Georgetown Hoyas	51	Louisville Cardinals	59	Louisville, Kentucky	Freedom Hall	
February 23	2 Tennessee Volunteers	66	1 Memphis Tigers	62	Memphis, Tennessee	FedEx Forum	
March 1	Kansas State Wildcats	74	7 Kansas Jayhawks	88	Lawrence, Kansas	Allen Fieldhouse	Rivalry
March 8	1 North Carolina Tar Heels	76	6 Duke Blue Devils	68	Durham, North Carolina	Cameron Indoor Stadium	Rivalry
April 5	(1) UCLA Bruins	63	(1) Memphis Tigers	78	San Antonio, Texas	Alamodome	Final Four
April 5	(1) Kansas Jayhawks	84	(1) North Carolina Tar Heels	66	San Antonio, Texas	Alamodome	Final Four
April 7	(1) Kansas Jayhawks	75 ^{OT}	(1) Memphis Tigers	68	San Antonio, Texas	Alamodome	National Championship Game

== 2008–09 men's season ==
Date	Visitor		Host		City	Location	Notes
January 17	Miami Hurricanes	65	6 North Carolina Tar Heels	82	Chapel Hill, North Carolina	Dean Smith Center	
January 24	3 UConn Huskies	69	19 Notre Dame Fighting Irish	61	South Bend, Indiana	Purcell Pavilion	
January 31	Florida Gators	63	Tennessee Volunteers	79	Knoxville, Tennessee	Thompson–Boling Arena	
February 7	15 Memphis Tigers	68	18 Gonzaga Bulldogs	50	Spokane, Washington	McCarthey Athletic Center	
February 14	24 Ohio State Buckeyes	50	Wisconsin Badgers	55	Madison, Wisconsin	Kohl Center	
February 21	2 Oklahoma Sooners	68	Texas Longhorns	73	Austin, Texas	Frank Erwin Center	
February 28	22 UCLA Bruins	72	California Golden Bears	68	Berkeley, California	Haas Pavilion	
March 7	6 Louisville Cardinals	62	West Virginia Mountaineers	59	Morgantown, West Virginia	WVU Coliseum	

== 2009–10 men's season ==
Date	Visitor		Host		City	Location	Notes
January 23	7 Duke Blue Devils	60	17 Clemson Tigers	47	Clemson, South Carolina	Littlejohn Coliseum	
January 30 (Note: Attendance of 8,159 set a GameDay show record.)	2 Kansas Jayhawks	81 ^{OT}	11 Kansas State Wildcats	79	Manhattan, Kansas	Bramlage Coliseum	Rivalry
February 6	5 Michigan State Spartans	73	Illinois Fighting Illini	78	Champaign, Illinois	Assembly Hall	
February 13 (Note: GameDay attendance record was broken with a crowd of 22,144.)	12 Tennessee Volunteers	62	2 Kentucky Wildcats	78	Lexington, Kentucky	Rupp Arena	Rivalry
February 20	UCLA Bruins	68	Washington Huskies	97	Seattle, Washington	Bank of America Arena	
February 27 (Note: GameDay attendance record was broken again with a crowd of 34,616. This remains the largest crowd in GameDay history.)	7 Villanova Wildcats	68	4 Syracuse Orange	97	Syracuse, New York	Carrier Dome	
March 6	North Carolina Tar Heels	50	4 Duke Blue Devils	82	Durham, North Carolina	Cameron Indoor Stadium	Rivalry

== 2009–10 women's season ==
Date	Visitor		Host		City	Location	Notes
January 16	3 Notre Dame Fighting Irish	46	1 UConn Huskies	70	Storrs, Connecticut	Harry A. Gampel Pavilion	Rivalry

== 2010–11 men's season ==
Date	Visitor		Host		City	Location	Notes
January 15 (Note: Doubleheader with women's game)	Vanderbilt Commodores	64	Tennessee Volunteers	67	Knoxville, Tennessee	Thompson–Boling Arena	
January 22	17 Michigan State Spartans	76	14 Purdue Boilermakers	86	West Lafayette, Indiana	Mackey Arena	
January 29	Kansas State Wildcats	66	6 Kansas Jayhawks	90	Lawrence, Kansas	Allen Fieldhouse	Rivalry
February 5	10 Kentucky Wildcats	68	Florida Gators	70	Gainesville, Florida	O'Connell Center	Rivalry
February 12	4 Pittsburgh Panthers	57	9 Villanova Wildcats	54	Villanova, Pennsylvania	Finneran Pavilion	
February 19	Illinois Fighting Illini	57	Michigan State Spartans	61	East Lansing, Michigan	Breslin Center	
February 26	1 Duke Blue Devils	60	Virginia Tech Hokies	64	Blacksburg, Virginia	Cassell Coliseum	
March 5	7 Texas Longhorns	60	Baylor Bears	54	Waco, Texas	Ferrell Center	

== 2010–11 women's season ==
Date	Visitor		Host		City	Location	Notes
January 15 (Note: Doubleheader with men's game)	Vanderbilt Commodores	56	6 Tennessee Lady Volunteers	68	Knoxville, Tennessee	Thompson–Boling Arena	

== 2011–12 men's season ==
Date	Visitor		Host		City	Location	Notes
January 14	3 North Carolina Tar Heels	57	Florida State Seminoles	90	Tallahassee, Florida	Donald L. Tucker Civic Center	
January 21	23 Louisville Cardinals	73	Pittsburgh Panthers	62	Pittsburgh, Pennsylvania	Petersen Events Center	
January 28	Washington Huskies	69	Arizona Wildcats	67	Tucson, Arizona	McKale Center	
February 4	8 Kansas Jayhawks	71	4 Missouri Tigers	74	Columbia, Missouri	Mizzou Arena	Border War
February 11	1 Kentucky Wildcats	69	Vanderbilt Commodores	63	Nashville, Tennessee	Memorial Gymnasium	
February 18	6 Ohio State Buckeyes	51	17 Michigan Wolverines	56	Ann Arbor, Michigan	Crisler Center	Rivalry
February 25	2 Syracuse Orange	71	UConn Huskies	69	Storrs, Connecticut	Harry A. Gampel Pavilion	Rivalry
March 3	6 North Carolina Tar Heels	88	4 Duke Blue Devils	70	Durham, North Carolina	Cameron Indoor Stadium	Rivalry

== 2012–13 men's season ==
Date	Visitor		Host		City	Location	Notes
January 19	8 Gonzaga Bulldogs	63	13 Butler Bulldogs	64	Indianapolis, Indiana	Hinkle Fieldhouse	
January 26	North Carolina Tar Heels	83	18 NC State Wolfpack	91	Raleigh, North Carolina	PNC Arena	Rivalry
February 2	1 Michigan Wolverines	73	3 Indiana Hoosiers	81	Bloomington, Indiana	Simon Skjodt Assembly Hall	
February 9	1 Louisville Cardinals	101	25 Notre Dame Fighting Irish	104^{5 OT}	South Bend, Indiana	Purcell Pavilion	
February 16	Texas Longhorns	47	14 Kansas Jayhawks	73	Lawrence, Kansas	Allen Fieldhouse	
February 23	Missouri Tigers	83	Kentucky Wildcats	90	Lexington, Kentucky	Rupp Arena	
March 2	11 Arizona Wildcats	69	UCLA Bruins	74	Los Angeles, California	Pauley Pavilion	Rivalry
March 9 (Note: GameDay aired from Washington, D.C., on ESPNU from 10 a.m. to 11 a.m. and then on ESPN from 11 a.m. to noon. The crew then traveled to Chapel Hill, NC, for the evening show at 8 p.m. on ESPN.)	17 Syracuse Orange	39	5 Georgetown Hoyas	61	Washington, D.C.	Verizon Center	
March 9	3 Duke Blue Devils	69	North Carolina Tar Heels	53	Chapel Hill, North Carolina	Dean Smith Center	Rivalry

== 2013–14 men's season ==
Date	Visitor		Host		City	Location	Notes
January 18	Temple Owls	68	La Salle Explorers	74	Philadelphia, Pennsylvania	The Palestra	
January 18	18 Louisville Cardinals	76	UConn Huskies	64	Storrs, Connecticut	Harry A. Gampel Pavilion	
January 25	21 Michigan Wolverines	80	3 Michigan State Spartans	75	East Lansing, Michigan	Breslin Center	Rivalry
February 1 (Note: Largest college basketball on-campus crowd in history, 35,446)	17 Duke Blue Devils	89	2 Syracuse Orange	91^{OT}	Syracuse, New York	Carrier Dome	
February 8	23 Gonzaga Bulldogs	54	24 Memphis Tigers	60	Memphis, Tennessee	FedEx Forum	
February 15	3 Florida Gators	69	14 Kentucky Wildcats	59	Lexington, Kentucky	Rupp Arena	Rivalry
February 22	4 Arizona Wildcats	88	Colorado Buffaloes	61	Boulder, Colorado	CU Events Center	
March 1	5 Kansas Jayhawks	65	Oklahoma State Cowboys	72	Stillwater, Oklahoma	Gallagher-Iba Arena	
March 8	14 North Carolina Tar Heels	81	4 Duke Blue Devils	93	Durham, North Carolina	Cameron Indoor Stadium	Rivalry

== 2014–15 men's season ==
Date	Visitor		Host		City	Location	Notes
January 17	9 Kansas Jayhawks	81	11 Iowa State Cyclones	86	Ames, Iowa	Hilton Coliseum	
January 24	6 Wisconsin Badgers	69	Michigan Wolverines	64	Ann Arbor, Michigan	Crisler Center	
January 31	4 Duke Blue Devils	69	2 Virginia Cavaliers	63	Charlottesville, Virginia	John Paul Jones Arena	
February 7	1 Kentucky Wildcats	68	Florida Gators	61	Gainesville, Florida	O'Connell Center	Rivalry
February 14	UConn Huskies	55	25 SMU Mustangs	73	University Park, Texas	Moody Coliseum	
February 21	UCLA Bruins	47	7 Arizona Wildcats	57	Tucson, Arizona	McKale Center	Rivalry
February 28	10 Northern Iowa Panthers	60	11 Wichita State Shockers	74	Wichita, Kansas	Charles Koch Arena	
February 28	Texas Longhorns	64	8 Kansas Jayhawks	69	Lawrence, Kansas	Allen Fieldhouse	
March 7	4 Duke Blue Devils	84	15 North Carolina Tar Heels	77	Chapel Hill, North Carolina	Dean Smith Center	Rivalry

== 2015–16 men's season ==
Date	Visitor		Host		City	Location	Notes
January 23	7 Maryland Terrapins	65	11 Michigan State Spartans	74	East Lansing, Michigan	Breslin Center	
January 30	20 Kentucky Wildcats	84	4 Kansas Jayhawks	90^{OT}	Lawrence, Kansas	Allen Fieldhouse	
February 6	2 North Carolina Tar Heels	76	Notre Dame Fighting Irish	80	Notre Dame, Indiana	Joyce Center	
February 13	6 Kansas Jayhawks	76	3 Oklahoma Sooners	72	Norman, Oklahoma	Lloyd Noble Center	
February 20	14 Kentucky Wildcats	77	Texas A&M Aggies	79^{OT}	College Station, Texas	Reed Arena	
February 27	7 North Carolina Tar Heels	74	3 Virginia Cavaliers	79	Charlottesville, Virginia	John Paul Jones Arena	
March 5	8 North Carolina Tar Heels	76	17 Duke Blue Devils	72	Durham, North Carolina	Cameron Indoor Stadium	Rivalry

== 2016–17 men's season ==
Date	Visitor		Host		City	Location	Notes
January 21	Miami Hurricanes	58	18 Duke Blue Devils	70	Durham, North Carolina	Cameron Indoor Stadium	
January 28	2 Kansas Jayhawks	79	4 Kentucky Wildcats	73	Lexington, Kentucky	Rupp Arena	
February 4	8 Kentucky Wildcats	66	24 Florida Gators	88	Gainesville, Florida	O'Connell Center	Rivalry
February 11	1 Gonzaga Bulldogs	74	20 Saint Mary's Gaels	64	Moraga, California	McKeon Pavilion	Rivalry
February 18	14 Virginia Cavaliers	41	10 North Carolina Tar Heels	65	Chapel Hill, North Carolina	Dean Smith Center	
February 25	5 UCLA Bruins	77	4 Arizona Wildcats	72	Tucson, Arizona	McKale Center	Rivalry
March 4	17 Duke Blue Devils	83	5 North Carolina Tar Heels	90	Chapel Hill, North Carolina	Dean Smith Center	Rivalry

== 2017–18 men's season ==
Date	Visitor		Host		City	Location	Notes
January 20	Florida Gators	66	18 Kentucky Wildcats	64	Lexington, Kentucky	Rupp Arena	Rivalry
January 27	Kentucky Wildcats	83	7 West Virginia Mountaineers	76	Morgantown, West Virginia	WVU Coliseum	
February 3	12 Oklahoma Sooners	74	Texas Longhorns	79	Austin, Texas	Frank Erwin Center	
February 8	9 Duke Blue Devils	78	21 North Carolina Tar Heels	82	Chapel Hill, North Carolina	Dean Smith Center	Rivalry
February 10	Virginia Tech Hokies	61^{OT}	2 Virginia Cavaliers	60	Charlottesville, Virginia	John Paul Jones Arena	Rivalry
February 17	20 West Virginia Mountaineers	69	13 Kansas Jayhawks	77	Lawrence, Kansas	Allen Fieldhouse	
February 24	8 Kansas Jayhawks	74	6 Texas Tech Red Raiders	72	Lubbock, Texas	United Supermarkets Arena	
March 3	9 North Carolina Tar Heels	64	5 Duke Blue Devils	74	Durham, North Carolina	Cameron Indoor Stadium	Rivalry

== 2018–19 men's season ==
Date	Visitor		Host		City	Location	Notes
November 6 2018	10 Michigan State Spartans	87	1 Kansas Jayhawks	92	Indianapolis, IN	Bankers Life Fieldhouse	Champions Classic
November 6 2018	4 Duke Blue Devils	118	2 Kentucky Wildcats	84	Indianapolis, IN	Bankers Life Fieldhouse	Champions Classic
January 19	4 Virginia Cavaliers	70	1 Duke Blue Devils	72	Durham, North Carolina	Cameron Indoor Stadium	
January 26	9 Kansas Jayhawks	63	8 Kentucky Wildcats	71	Lexington, Kentucky	Rupp Arena	
February 2	Indiana Hoosiers	79^{OT}	6 Michigan State Spartans	75	East Lansing, Michigan	Breslin Center	
February 9	2 Duke Blue Devils	81	3 Virginia Cavaliers	71	Charlottesville, Virginia	John Paul Jones Arena	
February 16	1 Tennessee Volunteers	69	5 Kentucky Wildcats	86	Lexington, Kentucky	Rupp Arena	Rivalry
February 20	8 North Carolina Tar Heels	88	1 Duke Blue Devils	72	Durham, North Carolina	Cameron Indoor Stadium	Rivalry
February 23 (Note: The February 23, 2019, show, which was supposed to be Duke vs Syracuse, was moved from Syracuse University in light of Jim Boeheim's involvement in a fatal car accident earlier that week.)	No Team	–	No Team	–	Bristol, Connecticut	ESPN Studios	
March 2	UCF Knights	69	8 Houston Cougars	64	Houston, Texas	Fertitta Center	
March 9	4 Duke Blue Devils	70	3 North Carolina Tar Heels	79	Chapel Hill, North Carolina	Dean Smith Center	Rivalry

== 2019–20 men's season ==
Date	Visitor		Host		City	Location	Notes
November 5 2019	(3) Kansas Jayhawks	66	(4) Duke Blue Devils	68	New York City, NY	Madison Square Garden	Champions Classic
November 5 2019	(1) Michigan State Spartans	62	(2) Kentucky Wildcats	69	New York City, NY	Madison Square Garden	Champions Classic
January 18	11 Louisville Cardinals	79	3 Duke Blue Devils	73	Durham, North Carolina	Cameron Indoor Stadium	
January 25	Tennessee Volunteers	68	3 Kansas Jayhawks	74	Lawrence, Kansas	Allen Fieldhouse	
February 1	13 Kentucky Wildcats	66	17 Auburn Tigers	75	Auburn, Alabama	Neville Arena	
February 8	7 Duke Blue Devils	98^{OT}	North Carolina Tar Heels	96	Chapel Hill, North Carolina	Dean Smith Center	Rivalry
February 15	9 Maryland Terrapins	67	Michigan State Spartans	60	East Lansing, Michigan	Breslin Center	
February 22	3 Kansas Jayhawks	64	1 Baylor Bears	61	Waco, Texas	Ferrell Center	
February 29	24 Michigan State Spartans	78	9 Maryland Terrapins	66	College Park, Maryland	Comcast Center	
March 7	George Washington Colonials	51	3 Dayton Flyers	76	Dayton, Ohio	UD Arena	

== 2020–21 men's season ==
Date	Visitor	Host	City	Location	Notes
January 16	No Team	No Team	Bristol, Connecticut	ESPN Studios	All shows were held from ESPN headquarters in Bristol, Connecticut, due to the COVID-19 pandemic.
January 23	No Team	No Team	Bristol, Connecticut	ESPN Studios	All shows were held from ESPN headquarters in Bristol, Connecticut, due to the COVID-19 pandemic.
January 30	No Team	No Team	Bristol, Connecticut	ESPN Studios	All shows were held from ESPN headquarters in Bristol, Connecticut, due to the COVID-19 pandemic.
February 6	No Team	No Team	Bristol, Connecticut	ESPN Studios	All shows were held from ESPN headquarters in Bristol, Connecticut, due to the COVID-19 pandemic.
February 13	No Team	No Team	Bristol, Connecticut	ESPN Studios	All shows were held from ESPN headquarters in Bristol, Connecticut, due to the COVID-19 pandemic.
February 20	No Team	No Team	Bristol, Connecticut	ESPN Studios	All shows were held from ESPN headquarters in Bristol, Connecticut, due to the COVID-19 pandemic.
February 27	No Team	No Team	Bristol, Connecticut	ESPN Studios	All shows were held from ESPN headquarters in Bristol, Connecticut, due to the COVID-19 pandemic.
March 6	No Team	No Team	Bristol, Connecticut	ESPN Studios	All shows were held from ESPN headquarters in Bristol, Connecticut, due to the COVID-19 pandemic.

== 2021–22 men's season ==
Date	Visitor		Host		City	Location	Notes
January 15	No Team	–	No Team	–	Bristol, Connecticut	ESPN Studios	
January 22	No Team	–	No Team	–	Bristol, Connecticut	ESPN Studios	
January 29	12 Kentucky Wildcats	80	5 Kansas Jayhawks	62	Lawrence, Kansas	Allen Fieldhouse	
February 5	9 Duke Blue Devils	87	North Carolina Tar Heels	67	Chapel Hill, North Carolina	Dean Smith Center	Rivalry
February 12	Texas A&M Aggies	58	1 Auburn Tigers	75	Auburn, Alabama	Neville Arena	
February 19	Oregon Ducks	81	3 Arizona Wildcats	84	Tucson, Arizona	McKale Center	
February 26	5 Kansas Jayhawks	70	10 Baylor Bears	80	Waco, Texas	Ferrell Center	
March 5	North Carolina Tar Heels	94	4 Duke Blue Devils	81	Durham, North Carolina	Cameron Indoor Stadium	Rivalry

== 2021–22 women's season ==
Date	Visitor		Host		City	Location	Notes
February 20	12 Tennessee Lady Volunteers	53	1 South Carolina Gamecocks	67	Columbia, South Carolina	Colonial Life Arena	

== 2022–23 men's season ==
Date	Visitor		Host		City	Location	Notes
January 14	No Team	–	No Team	–	Bristol, Connecticut	ESPN Studios	
January 21	No Team	–	No Team	–	Bristol, Connecticut	ESPN Studios	
January 28	10 Texas Longhorns	71	4 Tennessee Volunteers	82	Knoxville, Tennessee	Thompson–Boling Arena	Big 12/SEC Challenge
February 4	North Carolina Tar Heels	57	Duke Blue Devils	63	Durham, North Carolina	Cameron Indoor Stadium	Rivalry
February 11	3 Alabama Crimson Tide	77	Auburn Tigers	69	Auburn, Alabama	Neville Arena	Rivalry
February 18	9 Baylor Bears	71	5 Kansas Jayhawks	87	Lawrence, Kansas	Allen Fieldhouse	
February 25	15 Saint Mary's Gaels	68	12 Gonzaga Bulldogs	77	Spokane, Washington	McCarthey Athletic Center	Rivalry
March 4	Duke Blue Devils	62	North Carolina Tar Heels	57	Chapel Hill, North Carolina	Dean Smith Center	Rivalry
March 26	No Team	–	No Team	–	Bristol, Connecticut	ESPN Studios	
April 1	(9) Florida Atlantic Owls	71	(5) San Diego State Aztecs	72	Houston, Texas	NRG Stadium	2023 Final Four
April 1	(5) Miami Hurricanes	59	(4) UConn Huskies	72	Houston, Texas	NRG Stadium	2023 Final Four
April 3	(5) San Diego State Aztecs	59	(4) UConn Huskies	76	Houston, Texas	NRG Stadium	National Championship Game

== 2022–23 women's season ==
Date	Visitor		Host		City	Location	Notes
January 26	5 UConn Huskies	84	Tennessee Lady Volunteers	67	Knoxville, Tennessee	Thompson–Boling Arena	Rivalry
February 26	2 Indiana Hoosiers	85	6 Iowa Hawkeyes	86	Iowa City, Iowa	Carver–Hawkeye Arena	
March 5	Tennessee Lady Volunteers	58	1 South Carolina Gamecocks	74	Greenville, South Carolina	Bon Secours Wellness Arena	SEC Tournament

== 2023–24 men's season ==
Date	Visitor		Host		City	Location	Notes
January 13	No Team	–	No Team	–	Bristol, Connecticut	ESPN Studios	
January 20	No Team	–	No Team	–	Bristol, Connecticut	ESPN Studios	
January 27	6 Kentucky Wildcats	63	Arkansas Razorbacks	57	Fayetteville, Arkansas	Bud Walton Arena	
February 3	7 Duke Blue Devils	84	3 North Carolina Tar Heels	93	Chapel Hill, North Carolina	Dean Smith Center	Rivalry
February 10	13 Baylor Bears	61	4 Kansas Jayhawks	64	Lawrence, Kansas	Allen Fieldhouse	
February 17	22 Kentucky Wildcats	70	13 Auburn Tigers	59	Auburn, Alabama	Neville Arena	
February 24	Villanova Wildcats	54	1 UConn Huskies	78	Storrs, Connecticut	Harry A. Gampel Pavilion	
March 2	4 Tennessee Volunteers	81	14 Alabama Crimson Tide	74	Tuscaloosa, Alabama	Coleman Coliseum	Show aired on ABC
March 9	7 North Carolina Tar Heels	84	9 Duke Blue Devils	79	Durham, North Carolina	Cameron Indoor Stadium	Rivalry
March 16	NC State Wolfpack	84	4 North Carolina Tar Heels	76	Washington, D.C.	Capital One Arena	ACC Tournament
March 23	No Team	–	No Team	–	Bristol, Connecticut	ESPN Studios	
March 30	No Team	–	No Team	–	Bristol, Connecticut	ESPN Studios	
April 6	(4) Alabama Crimson Tide	72	(1) UConn Huskies	86	Glendale, Arizona	State Farm Stadium	2024 Final Four
April 6	(11) NC State Wolfpack	50	(1) Purdue Boilermakers	63	Glendale, Arizona	State Farm Stadium	2024 Final Four
April 8	(1) Purdue Boilermakers	60	(1) UConn Huskies	75	Glendale, Arizona	State Farm Stadium	National Championship Game

== 2023–24 women's season ==
Date	Visitor		Host		City	Location	Notes
January 25	1 South Carolina Gamecocks	76	9 LSU Tigers	70	Baton Rouge, Louisiana	Pete Maravich Assembly Center	
February 18	Georgia Lady Bulldogs	56	1 South Carolina Gamecocks	70	Columbia, South Carolina	Colonial Life Arena	Show aired on ABC
February 25	North Carolina Tar Heels	62	8 Virginia Tech Hokies	74	Blacksburg, Virginia	Cassell Coliseum	
March 3	2 Ohio State Buckeyes	83	6 Iowa Hawkeyes	93	Iowa City, Iowa	Carver-Hawkeye Arena	
March 10	14 Notre Dame Fighting Irish	55	11 NC State Wolfpack	51	Greensboro, North Carolina	Greensboro Coliseum	ACC Tournament

== 2024–25 men's season ==
Date	Visitor		Host		City	Location	Notes
January 11	No Team	–	No Team	–	Bristol, Connecticut	ESPN Studios	
January 18	No Team	–	No Team	–	Bristol, Connecticut	ESPN Studios	
January 25	6 Tennessee Volunteers	51	1 Auburn Tigers	53	Auburn, Alabama	Neville Arena	
February 1	North Carolina Tar Heels	70	2 Duke Blue Devils	87	Durham, North Carolina	Cameron Indoor Stadium	Rivalry
February 8	TCU Horned Frogs	52	8 Iowa State Cyclones	82	Ames, Iowa	Hilton Coliseum	
February 15	1 Auburn Tigers	94	2 Alabama Crimson Tide	85	Tuscaloosa, Alabama	Coleman Coliseum	Rivalry
February 22	8 Iowa State Cyclones	59	5 Houston Cougars	68	Houston, Texas	Fertitta Center	
March 1	12 Texas A&M Aggies	70	3 Florida Gators	89	Gainesville, Florida	O'Connell Center	
March 8	2 Duke Blue Devils	82	North Carolina Tar Heels	69	Chapel Hill, North Carolina	Dean Smith Center	Rivalry
March 15	8 Tennessee Volunteers	70	3 Auburn Tigers	65	Nashville, Tennessee	Bridgestone Arena	SEC Tournament
March 15	5 Alabama Crimson Tide	82	4 Florida Gators	104	Nashville, Tennessee	Bridgestone Arena	SEC Tournament
March 22	No Team	–	No Team	–	Bristol, Connecticut	ESPN Studios	
March 23	No Team	–	No Team	–	Bristol, Connecticut	ESPN Studios	
March 29	No Team	–	No Team	–	Bristol, Connecticut	ESPN Studios	
March 30	No Team	–	No Team	–	Bristol, Connecticut	ESPN Studios	
April 5	(1) Florida Gators	79	(1) Auburn Tigers	73	San Antonio, Texas	Alamo	2025 Final Four
April 5	(1) Houston Cougars	70	(1) Duke Blue Devils	67	San Antonio, Texas	Alamo	2025 Final Four
April 7	(1) Florida Gators	65	(1) Houston Cougars	63	San Antonio, Texas	Alamo	National Championship Game

== 2024–25 women's season ==
Date	Visitor		Host		City	Location	Notes
February 16	7 UConn Huskies	87	4 South Carolina Gamecocks	58	Columbia, South Carolina	Colonial Life Arena	2-hour show, 2nd hour aired on ABC
February 23	1 Notre Dame Fighting Irish	95	13 NC State Wolfpack	104^{2OT}	Raleigh, North Carolina	Reynolds Coliseum	
March 2	25 Louisville Cardinals	59	3 Notre Dame Fighting Irish	72	South Bend, Indiana	Joyce Center	
March 9	1 Texas Longhorns	45	5 South Carolina Gamecocks	64	Greenville, South Carolina	Bon Secours Wellness Arena	SEC Tournament

== 2025–26 men's season ==
Date	Visitor		Host		City	Location	Notes
November 19, 2025	17 Michigan State Spartans	83	12 Kentucky Wildcats	66	New York City, New York	Madison Square Garden	Champions Classic
November 19, 2025	24 Kansas Jayhawks	66	5 Duke Blue Devils	78	New York City, New York	Madison Square Garden	Champions Classic
January 10	No Team	-	No Team	-	Bristol, Connecticut	ESPN Studios	
January 17	No Team	-	No Team	-	Bristol, Connecticut	ESPN Studios	
January 24	6 Houston Cougars	86	12 Texas Tech Red Raiders	90	Lubbock, Texas	United Supermarkets Arena	
January 31	13 BYU Cougars	82	14 Kansas Jayhawks	90	Lawrence, Kansas	Allen Fieldhouse	
February 7	4 Duke Blue Devils	68	14 North Carolina Tar Heels	71	Chapel Hill, North Carolina	Dean Smith Center	Rivalry
February 14	16 Texas Tech Red Raiders	78	1 Arizona Wildcats	75^{OT}	Tucson, Arizona	McKale Center	
February 21	1 Michigan Wolverines	63	3 Duke Blue Devils	68	Washington, DC	Capital One Arena	Rivalry/Capital Showcase
February 28	20 Arkansas Razorbacks	77	7 Florida Gators	111	Gainesville, Florida	O'Connell Center	
March 7	17 North Carolina Tar Heels	61	1 Duke Blue Devils	76	Durham, North Carolina	Cameron Indoor Stadium	Rivalry
March 14	5 Houston Cougars	74	2 Arizona Wildcats	79	Kansas City, Missouri	T-Mobile Center	Big 12 Tournament Championship
April 4	(3) Illinois Fighting Illini	62	(2) UConn Huskies	71	Indianapolis, Indiana	Morris Bicentennial Plaza	2026 Final Four
April 4	(1) Michigan Wolverines	91	(1) Arizona Wildcats	73	Indianapolis, Indiana	Morris Bicentennial Plaza	2026 Final Four
April 6	(2) UConn Huskies	63	(1) Michigan Wolverines	69	Indianapolis, Indiana	Morris Bicentennial Plaza	National Championship Game

== 2025–26 women's season ==
Date	Visitor		Host		City	Location	Notes
February 1	10 Oklahoma Sooners	70	4 Texas Longhorns	78	Austin, Texas	Moody Center	Red River Rivalry
February 14	3 South Carolina Gamecocks	79	6 LSU Tigers	72	Baton Rouge, Louisiana	Pete Maravich Assembly Center	
February 22	17 Ole Miss Rebels	48	3 South Carolina Gamecocks	85	Columbia, South Carolina	Colonial Life Arena	
March 1	18 Baylor Bears	53	11 TCU Horned Frogs	65	Fort Worth, Texas	Schollmaier Arena	
March 8	4 Texas Longhorns	78	3 South Carolina Gamecocks	61	Greenville, South Carolina	Bon Secours Wellness Arena	SEC Tournament Championship

== Notes ==
Winners are listed in bold.
Home team listed in italics for neutral-site or off-campus games.
All rankings displayed for Division I teams are from the AP Poll.
Rankings displayed in parentheses refer to seeding in the NCAA Tournament.
