= 2004 West Coast Conference men's basketball tournament =

- Classification: Division I
- Season: 2003–04
- Teams: 8
- Site: Leavey Center; Santa Clara, California
- Champions: Gonzaga (6th title)
- Winning coach: Mark Few (4th title)
- MVP: Ronny Turiaf (Gonzaga)
- Television: ESPN2, ESPN

2003–04 West Coast Conference men's basketball standings
	Conf.				Overall
Team	W		L	PCT	W		L	PCT
No. 3 Gonzaga	14	–	0	1.000	28	–	3	.903
Saint Mary's	9	–	5	.643	19	–	12	.613
Pepperdine	9	–	5	.643	15	–	16	.484
San Francisco	7	–	7	.500	17	–	14	.548
Santa Clara	6	–	8	.429	16	–	16	.500
Portland	5	–	9	.357	11	–	17	.393
Loyola Marymount	5	–	9	.357	15	–	14	.517
San Diego	1	–	13	.071	4	–	26	.133
† 2004 WCC tournament winner Rankings from AP Poll

The 2004 West Coast Conference men's basketball tournament took place March 5–8, 2004. All rounds were held in Santa Clara, California at the Leavey Center. The semifinals were televised by ESPN2. The West Coast Conference Championship Game was televised by ESPN.

The Gonzaga Bulldogs earned their sixth WCC Tournament title and an automatic bid to the 2004 NCAA tournament. Ronny Turiaf of Gonzaga was named Tournament MVP.

== Bracket ==
First round Friday, March 5
5	Santa Clara	82
8	San Diego	48
6	Loyola Marymount	82
7	Portland	77

Quarter finals Saturday, March 6
4	San Francisco	75
5	Santa Clara	81
3	Pepperdine	78
6	Loyola Marymount	67

Semi-finals; Sunday, March 7
1	#4 Gonzaga	63
5	Santa Clara	62
2	Saint Mary's	79
3	Pepperdine	74

Finals; Monday, March 8
1	#4 Gonzaga	84
3	Saint Mary's	71

== See also ==
- West Coast Conference
