= 2003–04 Gonzaga Bulldogs men's basketball team =

American college basketball season

2003–04 Gonzaga Bulldogs men's basketball

WCC Regular Season Champions WCC tournament champions

NCAA tournament, Round of 32
- Conference: West Coast Conference

Ranking
- Coaches: No. 12
- AP: No. 3
- Record: 28–3 (14–0 WCC)
- Head coach: Mark Few (5th season)
- Assistant coaches: Bill Grier (13th season); Leon Rice (5th season); Tommy Lloyd (3rd season)
- Home arena: Charlotte Y. Martin Centre

2003–04 West Coast Conference men's basketball standings
	Conf.				Overall
Team	W		L	PCT	W		L	PCT
No. 3 Gonzaga	14	–	0	1.000	28	–	3	.903
Saint Mary's	9	–	5	.643	19	–	12	.613
Pepperdine	9	–	5	.643	15	–	16	.484
San Francisco	7	–	7	.500	17	–	14	.548
Santa Clara	6	–	8	.429	16	–	16	.500
Portland	5	–	9	.357	11	–	17	.393
Loyola Marymount	5	–	9	.357	15	–	14	.517
San Diego	1	–	13	.071	4	–	26	.133
† 2004 WCC tournament winner Rankings from AP Poll

The 2003–04 Gonzaga Bulldogs men's basketball team represented Gonzaga Universityin the 2003–2004 NCAA Division I basketball season.

== Preseason ==
=== Departures ===
Name	Number	Pos.	Height	Weight	Year	Hometown	Reason for departure
Zach Gourde	32	F	6'8"	245	Senior (Redshirt)	Vancouver, WA	Graduated
Winston Brooks	1	G	6'0"	198	Senior	Richmond, VA	Graduated
Dustin Villepique	30	F	6'9"	235	Freshman (Redshirt)	Simi Valley, CA	Transferred to Dixie State
Josh Reisman	13	G	6'1"	165	Freshman (Redshirt)	Mount Vernon, WA	Transferred to San Jose City College
Tyler Amaya	23	F	6'7"	200	Freshman (Redshirt)	Mount Vernon, WA	Transferred to Dixie State

=== Incoming transfers ===
Name	Pos.	Height	Weight	Year	Hometown	Previous School	Years Remaining	Date Eligible
Nathan Doudney	G	6'4"	269	Junior	Rockwall, TX	Texas Tech	2	Oct. 1, 2004

=== 2003 Recruiting Class ===
College recruiting information
Name	Hometown	School	Height	Weight	Commit date
Adam Morrison; F	Spokane, WA	Mead	6 ft 8 in (2.03 m)	204 lb (93 kg)	Apr 8, 2002
Adam Morrison; F	Recruit ratings: Scout: Rivals:				
Derek Raivio; G	Vancouver, WA	Mountain View	6 ft 3 in (1.91 m)	158 lb (72 kg)	Jun 8, 2002
Derek Raivio; G	Recruit ratings: Scout: Rivals:				
Calum MacLeod; C	Wellington, New Zealand	Hutt Valley	7 ft 0 in (2.13 m)	220 lb (100 kg)	Jan, 14, 2004
Calum MacLeod; C	Recruit ratings: Scout: Rivals:				
Overall recruit ranking: Scout: NR Rivals: NR ESPN: NR
Note: In many cases, Scout, Rivals, 247Sports, On3, and ESPN may conflict in their listings of height and weight.; In these cases, the average was taken. ESPN grades are on a 100-point scale.; Sources: "2003 Gonzaga Rivals Commits". Rivals.; "2003 Gonzaga Scout Commits". Scout.; "2003 Gonzaga ESPN Commits". ESPN.; "Scout.com Team Recruiting Rankings". Scout.; "2003 Team Ranking". Rivals.; "2003–04 Gonzaga Bulldogs men's basketball team". 247Sports.

== Roster ==
2003–04 Gonzaga Bulldogs men's basketball team
Players
Coaches

Pos.	#	Name	Height	Weight	Year	Previous school	Hometown
C	34	Richard Fox	6 ft 11 in (2.11 m)	265 lb (120 kg)	RS Sr	Regis Jesuit; Colorado	Denver, CO
G	20	Kyle Bankhead	6 ft 0 in (1.83 m)	195 lb (88 kg)	RS Sr	Walla Walla	Walla Walla, WA
G	4	Tony Skinner	6 ft 5 in (1.96 m)	198 lb (90 kg)	Sr	Cibola; Northeastern JC	Albuquerque, NM
G	10	Blake Stepp	6 ft 4 in (1.93 m)	194 lb (88 kg)	Sr	South Eugene	Eugene, OR
F	33	Cory Violette	6 ft 8 in (2.03 m)	265 lb (120 kg)	Sr	Bishop Kelly	Boise, ID
G	14	Brian Michaelson (W)	6 ft 3 in (1.91 m)	198 lb (90 kg)	RS Jr	Jesuit	Portland, OR
F	1	Ronny Turiaf	6 ft 10 in (2.08 m)	243 lb (110 kg)	Jr	INSEP	Le Robert, Martinique
G	11	Nathan Doudney (I) (redshirt)	6 ft 4 in (1.93 m)	198 lb (90 kg)	Jr	Rockwall; Texas Tech	Rockwall, TX
G	22	Erroll Knight	6 ft 6 in (1.98 m)	212 lb (96 kg)	RS So	Chief Sealth; Washington	Seattle, WA
G	15	Colin Floyd (W)	6 ft 2 in (1.88 m)	183 lb (83 kg)	RS So	Sprague-Harrington	Harrington, WA
G	24	Stephen Gentry (W)	6 ft 1 in (1.85 m)	168 lb (76 kg)	RS So	Fort Scott	Fort Scott, KS
F	32	Sean Mallon	6 ft 9 in (2.06 m)	220 lb (100 kg)	RS Fr	Ferris	Spokane, WA
F	3	Adam Morrison	6 ft 8 in (2.03 m)	204 lb (93 kg)	Fr	Mead	Spokane, WA
G	5	Derek Raivio	6 ft 1 in (1.85 m)	158 lb (72 kg)	Fr	Mountain View	Vancouver, WA
C	00	Calum MacLeod (redshirt)	7 ft 0 in (2.13 m)	220 lb (100 kg)	Fr	Hutt Valley	Wellington, New Zealand

Head coach

- Mark Few

Assistant coach(es)

- Bill Grier
- Leon Rice
- Tommy Lloyd

Legend

- (C) Team captain
- (S) Suspended
- (I) Ineligible
- (W) Walk-on
- Injured
- Current redshirt

Roster
Last update: 2010-3-14

== Schedule ==
Date time, TV	Rank^{#}	Opponent^{#}	Result	Record	Site (attendance) city, state
Regular Season
11/14/2003*; 6:00 pm, ESPN2	No. 10	vs. No. 17 St. Joseph's; Coaches vs. Cancer	L 73–66	0–1	Madison Square Garden (10,328); New York, NY
11/21/2003*; 7:00 pm, PAX	No. 16	Idaho	W 84–63	1–1	Charlotte Y. Martin Centre (4,000); Spokane, WA
11/24/2003*; 7:00 pm, PAX	No. 16	Denver	W 90–58	2–1	Charlotte Y. Martin Centre (4,000); Spokane, WA
11/29/2003*; 1:00 pm, FOX Sports	No. 16	Georgia	W 82–76 ^{OT}	3–1	Spokane Arena (10,830); Spokane, WA
12/03/2003*; 7:00 pm, FOX Sports	No. 17	at Washington	W 86–62	4–1	Bank of America Arena (10,000); Seattle, WA
12/06/2003*; 12:00 pm, KAYU	No. 17	vs. Maryland; BB&T Classic Opening Round	W 82–68	5–1	Verizon Center (13,609); Washington D.C.
12/07/2003*; 2:00 pm, KAYU	No. 17	vs. George Washington; BB&T Classic - Championship Game	W 96–91	6–1	Verizon Center (11,025); Washington D.C.
12/13/2003*; 11:00 am, CBS	No. 17	vs. No. 3 Missouri; Battle in Seattle	W 87–80 ^{OT}	7–1	KeyArena (12,831); Seattle, WA
12/20/2003*; 6:00 pm, CSTV	No. 13	vs. No. 9 Stanford; Pete Newell Challenge	L 87–80	7–2	Oakland Arena (12,066); Oakland, CA
12/28/2003*; 7:00 pm, FOX Sports	No. 15	Washington State	W 96–58	8–2	Charlotte Y. Martin Centre (4,000); Spokane, WA
12/31/2003*; 5:00 pm, KHQ-TV	No. 16	Eastern Washington	W 70–49	9–2	Spokane Arena (12,299); Spokane, WA
01/04/2004*; 5:00 pm, KHQ	No. 16	Montana	W 88–67	10–2	Charlotte Y. Martin Centre (4,000); Spokane, WA
01/08/2004; 5:00 pm, FOX Sports	No. 16	at Pepperdine	W 87–70	11–2 (1–0)	Firestone Fieldhouse (3,120); Malibu, CA
01/10/2004; 7:00 pm	No. 16	at Loyola Marymount	W 74–60	12–2 (2–0)	Gersten Pavilion (3,910); Los Angeles, CA
01/15/2004; 7:00 pm, PAX	No. 16	San Francisco	W 92–50	13–2 (3–0)	Charlotte Y. Martin Centre (4,000); Spokane, WA
01/17/2004; 8:00 pm, ESPN2	No. 16	St. Mary's	W 75–61	14–2 (4–0)	Charlotte Y. Martin Centre (4,000); Spokane, WA
01/23/2004; 7:00 pm, FOX Sports	No. 15	at Portland	W 80–65	15–2 (5–0)	Chiles Center (4,834); Portland, OR
01/29/2004; 7:00 pm, PAX	No. 10	at San Diego	W 85–73	16–2 (6–0)	Jenny Craig Pavilion (4,919); San Diego, CA
01/31/2004; 7:00 pm, FOX Sports	No. 10	at Santa Clara	W 79–63	17–2 (7–0)	Leavey Center (4,500); Santa Clara, CA
02/05/2004; 8:00 pm, ESPN2	No. 8	Pepperdine	W 93–73	18–2 (8–0)	Charlotte Y. Martin Centre (4,000); Spokane, WA
02/07/2004; 5:00 pm, KHQ	No. 8	Loyola Marymount	W 87–57	19–2 (9–0)	Charlotte Y. Martin Centre (4,000); Spokane, WA
02/12/2004; 8:00 pm, ESPN2	No. 7	at San Francisco	W 71–48	20–2 (10–0)	War Memorial Gymnasium (5,208); San Francisco, CA
02/14/2004; 7:00 pm, CSTV	No. 7	at St. Mary's	W 79–60	21–2 (11–0)	McKeon Pavilion (3,500); Moraga, CA
02/18/2004; 7:00 pm, FOX Sports	No. 6	Portland	W 79–69	22–2 (12–0)	Charlotte Y. Martin Centre (4,000); Spokane, WA
02/21/2004; 3:00 pm, ESPN2	No. 6	at Tulsa; BracketBuster	W 76–56	23–2	Donald Reynolds Center (8,355); Tulsa, OK
02/26/2004; 8:00 pm, ESPN2	No. 4	San Diego	W 97–78	24–2 (13–0)	Charlotte Y. Martin Centre (4,000); Spokane, WA
02/28/2004; 6:00 pm, ESPN2	No. 4	Santa Clara	W 80–64	25–2 (14–0)	Charlotte Y. Martin Centre (4,000); Spokane, WA
2004 West Coast Conference tournament
03/07/2004; 9:00 pm, ESPN	No. 4	Santa Clara; Semifinals	W 63–62	26–2	Leavey Center (4,500); Santa Clara, CA
03/08/2004; 8:00 pm, ESPN	No. 3	vs. St. Mary's; Championship	W 84–71	27–2	Leavey Center (4,500); Santa Clara, CA
NCAA Division I men's basketball tournament
03/18/2004*; 6:00 pm, CBS	No. 3 (2 seed)	vs. (15) Valparaiso; NCAA Tournament Round of 64	W 76–49	28–2	KeyArena (15,827); Seattle, WA
03/20/2004*; 11:10 am, CBS	No. 3 (2)	vs. (10) Nevada; NCAA Tournament Round of 32	L 91–72	28–3	KeyArena (15,827); Seattle, WA
*Non-conference game. ^{#}Rankings from AP Poll. (#) Tournament seedings in parentheses. All times are in Pacific Time.
