= 2004–05 Saint Mary's Gaels men's basketball team =

American college basketball season

2004–05 Saint Mary's Gaels men's basketball

NCAA tournament, first round
- Conference: West Coast Conference
- Record: 25–9 (11–3 WCC)
- Head coach: Randy Bennett (4th season)
- Assistant coaches: Kyle Smith; David Patrick; Mark Campbell
- Home arena: McKeon Pavilion

2004–05 West Coast Conference men's basketball standings
	Conf.				Overall
Team	W		L	PCT	W		L	PCT
No. 10 Gonzaga	12	–	2	.857	26	–	5	.839
Saint Mary's	11	–	3	.786	25	–	9	.735
Santa Clara	7	–	7	.500	15	–	16	.484
San Diego	7	–	7	.500	16	–	13	.552
Pepperdine	6	–	8	.429	17	–	14	.548
San Francisco	6	–	8	.429	17	–	14	.548
Portland	4	–	10	.286	15	–	15	.500
Loyola Marymount	3	–	11	.214	11	–	17	.393
† 2005 WCC tournament winner Rankings from AP Poll

The 2004–05 Saint Mary's Gaels men's basketball team represented Saint Mary's College of California in the 2004–05 college basketball season, coached by Randy Bennett for the 4th year. The Gaels competed in the West Coast Conference and played their home games at the McKeon Pavilion. They finished conference play with a record of 11–3 to place second. They reached the semifinal round of the 2005 West Coast Conference men's basketball tournament, but received an at-large bid to the 2005 NCAA Division I men's basketball tournament where they entered as the No. 10 seed in the Chicago region. The Gaels were beaten by No. 7 seed Southern Illinois in the opening round to end their season 25–9.

== Roster ==
2004–05 Saint Mary's Gaels men's basketball team
Players
Coaches

Pos.	#	Name	Height	Weight	Year	Previous school	Hometown
G	2	E. J. Rowland	6 ft 2 in (1.88 m)	190 lb (86 kg)	Sr	Hartnell College	Salinas, California
F	14	Daniel Kickert	6 ft 10 in (2.08 m)	240 lb (109 kg)	Jr	Aquinas College	Melbourne, Victoria
G	24	Todd Golden	6 ft 3 in (1.91 m)	180 lb (82 kg)	Fr	Sunnyslope HS	Phoenix, Arizona

Head coach

- Randy Bennett

Assistant coach(es)

Legend

- (C) Team captain
- (S) Suspended
- (I) Ineligible
- (W) Walk-on
- Injured
- Current redshirt

== Schedule and results ==
Date time, TV	Rank^{#}	Opponent^{#}	Result	Record	Site (attendance) city, state
Non-conference regular season
Nov 11, 2004*		vs. Belmont; Coaches vs. Cancer Classic	W 67–58	1–0	Haas Pavilion; Berkeley, California
Nov 12, 2004*		at California; Coaches vs. Cancer Classic	W 61–52	2–0	Haas Pavilion; Berkeley, California
Nov 18, 2004*		vs. No. 24 Memphis; Coaches vs. Cancer Classic	L 66–81	2–1	Madison Square Garden; New York, New York
Nov 19, 2004*		vs. No. 12 Mississippi State; Coaches vs. Cancer Classic	L 54–67	2–2	Madison Square Garden; New York, New York
Nov 21, 2004*		San Francisco State	W 71–48	3–2	McKeon Pavilion; Moraga, California
Nov 23, 2004*		at UNLV	W 64–54	4–2	Thomas & Mack Center; Las Vegas, Nevada
Nov 27, 2004*		at Rutgers	L 58–66	4–3	Louis Brown Athletic Center; Piscataway, New Jersey
Dec 2, 2004*		Delaware	W 67–58	5–3	McKeon Pavilion; Moraga, California
Dec 11, 2004*		at Hawaii	L 77–84	6–4	Stan Sheriff Center; Honolulu, Hawaii
Dec 14, 2004*		at San Diego State	W 73–64	7–4	Cox Arena; San Diego, California
WCC regular season
Jan 6, 2005		Portland	W 66–45	13–4 (1–0)	McKeon Pavilion; Moraga, California
Feb 26, 2005		at San Diego	W 86–83	24–7 (11–3)	Jenny Craig Pavilion; San Diego, California
WCC tournament
Mar 6, 2005*	(2)	at (3) Santa Clara; Quarterfinals	W 69–64	25–7	Leavey Center; Santa Clara, California
Mar 7, 2005*	(2)	vs. (1) No. 11 Gonzaga; Semifinals	L 67–80	25–8	Leavey Center; Santa Clara, California
NCAA tournament
Mar 18, 2005*	(10 CHI)	vs. (7 CHI) Southern Illinois; First round	L 56–65	25–9	Ford Center; Oklahoma City, Oklahoma
*Non-conference game. ^{#}Rankings from AP poll. (#) Tournament seedings in parentheses. CHI=Chicago.

- All times are Pacific
