= Brewster High School (Brewster, Washington) =

Location
- 503 S. 7th Street; Brewster, WA 98812; 48°05′39″N 119°47′16″W

Information
- Type: Public
- Principal: Todd Phillips
- Staff: 15.59 (FTE)
- Grades: 9-12
- Enrollment: 331 (2023-2024)
- Student to teacher ratio: 21.23
- Colors: White and red
- Mascot: Bear
- Website: Brewster H.S.

Brewster High School is a high school in Brewster, Washington. The school has about 420 students in the junior and senior high, and 990 students K-12.

== Discrimination suit ==
In October 2005, a group of eight Latino parents filed a discrimination lawsuit in a federal district court. According to the lawsuit, Principal Randy Phillips called a meeting with Hispanic students, in which he told them they showed less respect, scored lower on tests, and fought more than non-Hispanic students. The lawsuit was settled in 2006, and included the formation of a school office of minority affairs.
