= Josh Heytvelt =

American professional basketball player (born 1986)

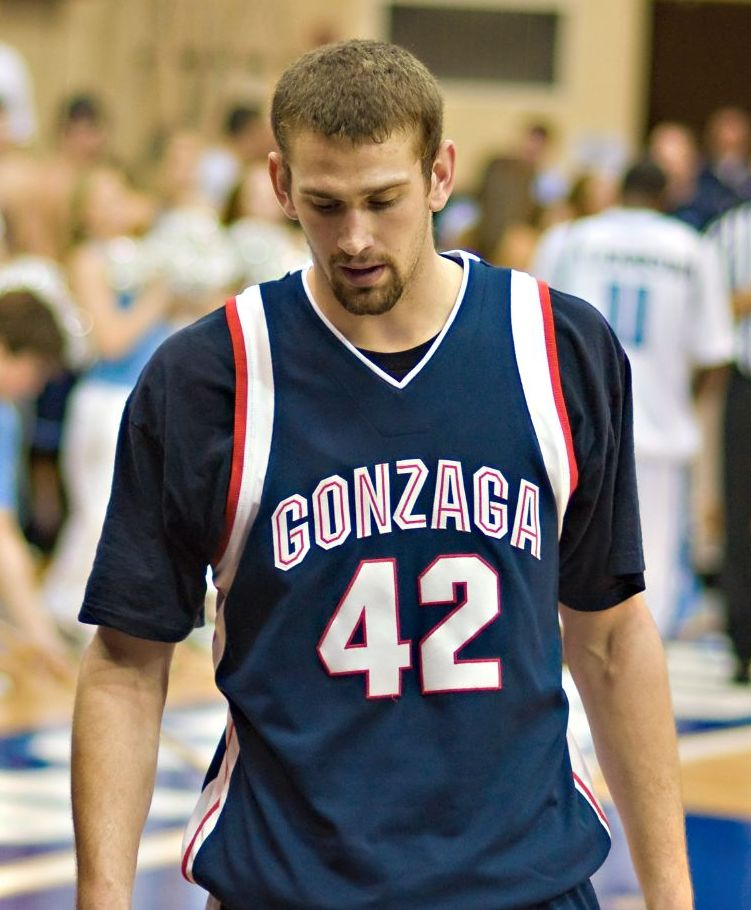

Personal information
- Born: June 26, 1986 (age 40) Clarkston, Washington
- Listed height: 6 ft 11 in (2.11 m)
- Listed weight: 238 lb (108 kg)

Career information
- High school: Clarkston (Clarkston, Washington)
- College: Gonzaga (2005–2009)
- NBA draft: 2009: undrafted
- Playing career: 2009–2016
- Position: Power forward

Career history
- 2009–2010: Oyak Renault
- 2010–2011: Lottomatica Roma
- 2011–2012: KK Zagreb
- 2012–2013: Tofaş
- 2013–2014: Yeşilgiresun Belediye
- 2014–2016: Hitachi SunRockers

Career highlights
- Croatian A-1 League champion (2011); Croatian Cup champion (2011); First-team All-WCC (2009)

Joshua Rolin Heytvelt (/ˈhaɪtfɛlt/; born June 26, 1986) is an American former professional basketball player who last played for Hitachi SunRockers of the Japanese National Basketball League.

== College ==
The 6-foot 11 inch (2.11 m) forward came to the Gonzaga Bulldogs in 2004 after a high school career in Clarkston, Washington that saw him named the state's Class 3A Player of the Year for three consecutive years. He sat out the 2004–05 season as a redshirt. Coach Mark Few and the Bulldogs counted on Heytvelt to be a major contributor in his freshman season of eligibility in 2005–06 as part of the supporting cast behind superstar Adam Morrison, but he missed most of the season due to a broken ankle suffered in the Maui Invitational.

In the 2006–07 season, he emerged as a potential star, becoming the team's second-leading scorer with 15.5 per game (behind Derek Raivio), top rebounder (7.7 per game), and leading shot-blocker (1.7 per game). The best game of his career came on February 26, 2009 against Santa Clara, when he scored 29 points and grabbed 9 rebounds. However, in what was effectively his freshman year as a player, there were several games in which he made only sporadic impact.

== Professional career ==
Following his senior season with Gonzaga in 2008–09, he declared for the 2009 NBA draft, where he went undrafted. In 2009 Heytvelt played for the Washington Wizards in the NBA Summer League. For his first pro season, he went to Turkey to play for Oyak Renault.

In May 2010, he signed with Lottomatica Roma until the end of the 2009–10 season and then was re-signed for another season, but left the team in January 2011. On January 13, 2011 he signed with KK Zagreb in Croatia until the end of the season. He later re-signed with Zagreb for one more season.

On June 28, 2012, Heytvelt returned to Turkey after signing a contract with Tofaş for the 2012–13 season. For the 2013–14 season, he signed with Yeşilgiresun Belediye of the Turkish Basketball Second League.

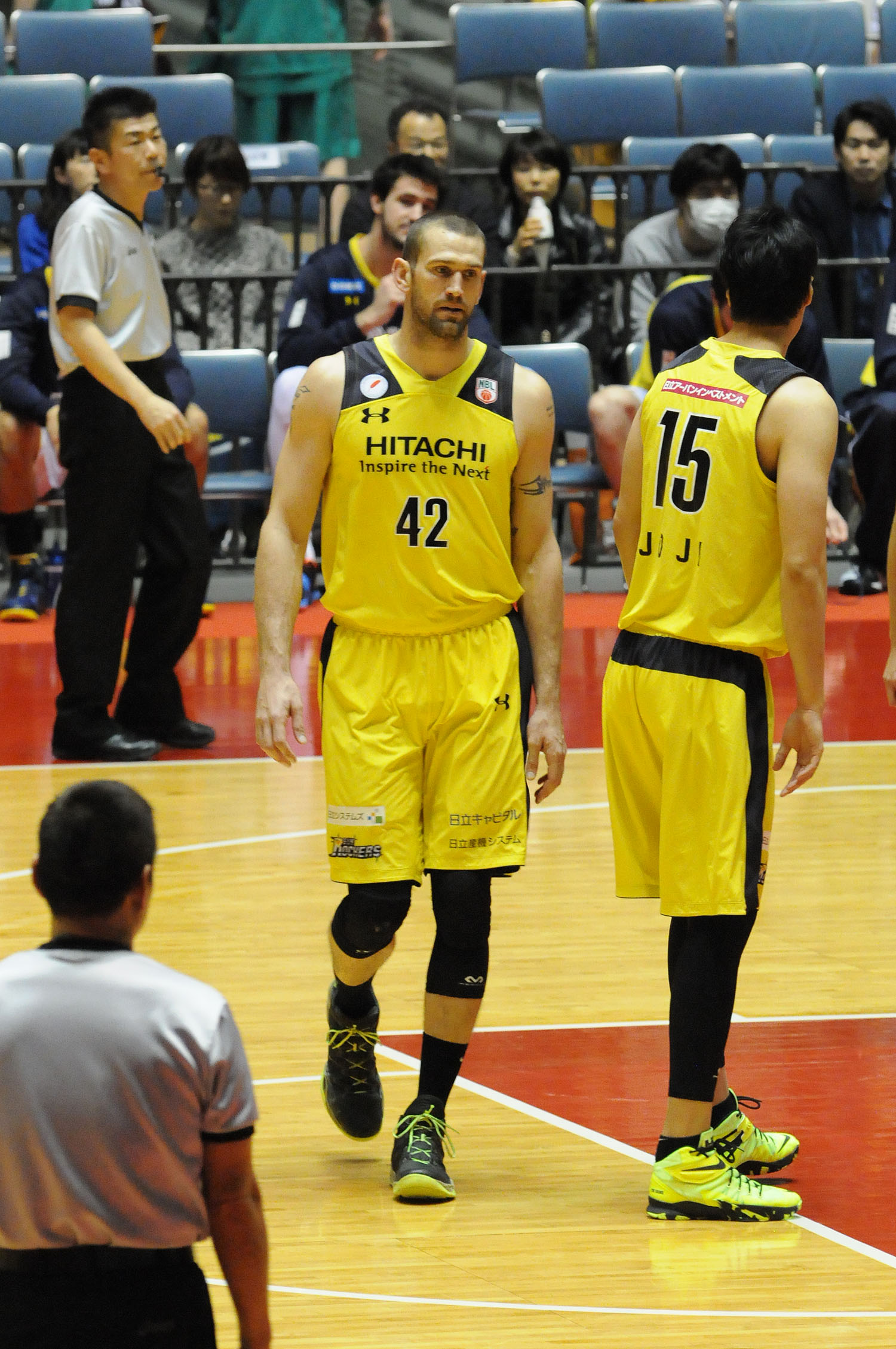

On August 2, 2014, Heytvelt signed with Hitachi SunRockers of the Japanese National Basketball League.
