= Adam Morrison =

American basketball player (born 1984)

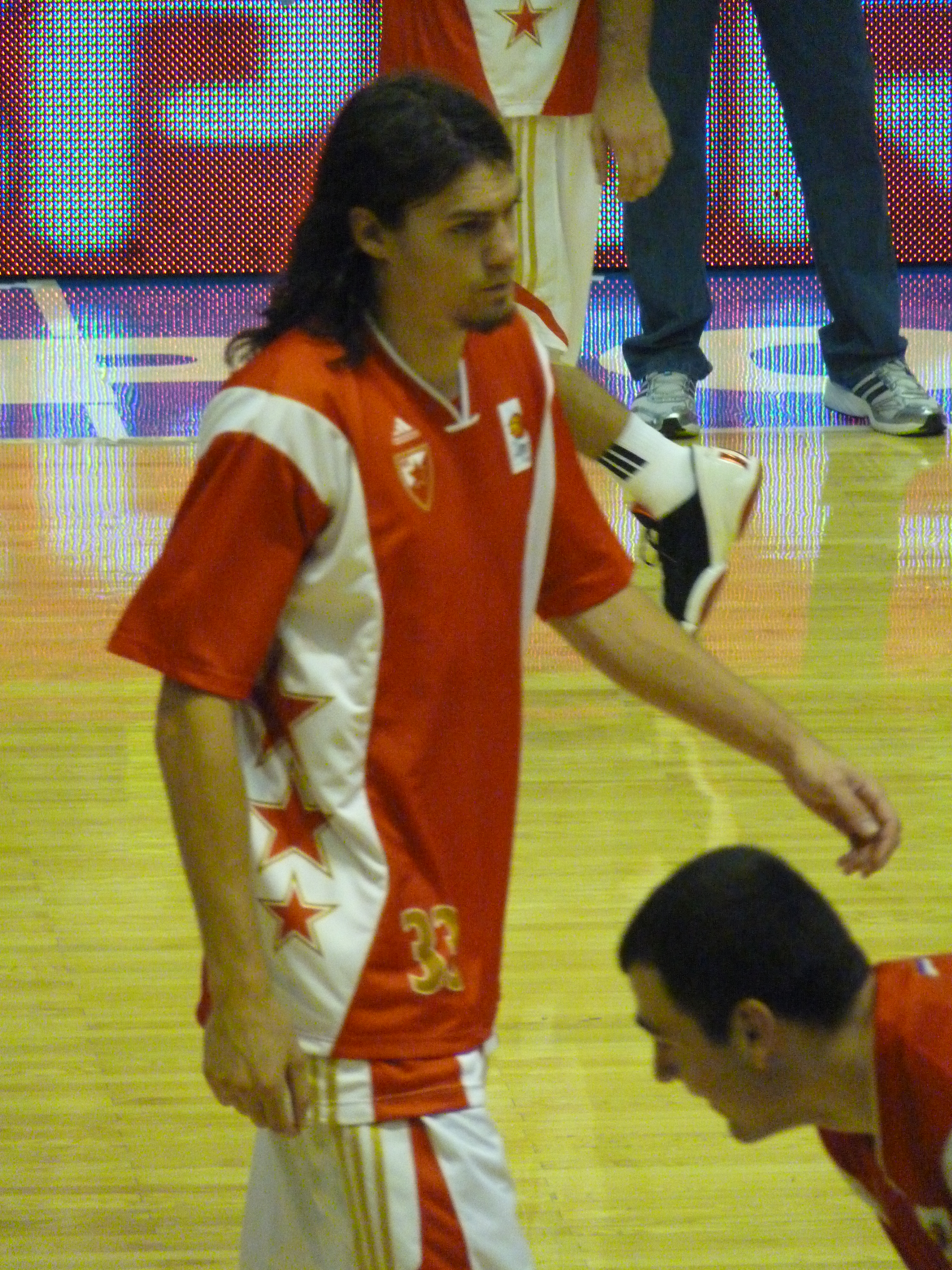
- Morrison with Crvena zvezda in 2011

Personal information
- Born: July 19, 1984 (age 42) Glendive, Montana, U.S.
- Listed height: 6 ft 8 in (2.03 m)
- Listed weight: 205 lb (93 kg)

Career information
- High school: Mead (Spokane, Washington)
- College: Gonzaga (2003–2006)
- NBA draft: 2006: 1st round, 3rd overall pick
- Drafted by: Charlotte Bobcats
- Playing career: 2006–2012
- Position: Small forward / power forward
- Number: 35, 6, 33
- Coaching career: 2017–present

Career history

Playing
- 2006–2009: Charlotte Bobcats
- 2009–2010: Los Angeles Lakers
- 2011: Crvena zvezda
- 2012: Beşiktaş

Coaching
- 2017–present: Mead HS (assistant)

Career highlights
- 2× NBA champion (2009, 2010); NBA All-Rookie Second Team (2007); Turkish Cup champion (2012); NABC Co-Player of the Year (2006); Oscar Robertson Trophy (2006); Consensus first-team All-American (2006); NCAA scoring champion (2006); WCC Player of the Year (2006); 2× First-team All-WCC (2005, 2006); WCC All-Freshman Team (2004); No. 3 retired by Gonzaga Bulldogs

Career NBA statistics
- Points: 1,200 (7.5 ppg)
- Rebounds: 342 (2.1 rpg)
- Assists: 222 (1.4 apg)
- Stats at NBA.com
- Stats at Basketball Reference
Medals
Men's basketball
Representing United States
FIBA Americas U20 Championship
Gold medal – first place	2004 Halifax	National team

Adam John Morrison (born July 19, 1984) is an American former professional basketball player. Morrison played for three years at Gonzaga University and was considered to be one of the top college basketball players in 2005–06. He was a finalist for the Naismith and the Wooden Award. He was named Co-Player of the Year with Duke's JJ Redick by the United States Basketball Writers Association and won the 2006 Chevrolet Player of the Year award. He played for the Charlotte Bobcats from 2006 to 2009, and for the L.A. Lakers from 2009 to 2010, where he won two NBA championships.

== Early life ==
Morrison's father, John, worked as a basketball coach, and the family moved with his coaching career: Casper College in Casper, Wyoming, Dakota Wesleyan University in Mitchell, South Dakota, and Dawson Community College in Glendive, Montana. When Morrison was in the fourth grade, his father left coaching, and the family moved to Spokane, Washington. Adam became the Gonzaga men's team's ball boy.

When he was in the eighth grade, he lost 30 pounds (14 kg), and while attending a basketball camp at Gonzaga during this time, he felt sick, later saying about his experience at the camp, "I think I made one shot the whole three days. I was sicker than a dog. I didn't want to play. I couldn't do anything." Shortly after this, Morrison was diagnosed with type 1 diabetes. He took his diagnosis surprisingly well; the second time a nurse came to administer insulin, he stopped her, telling her, "Since I'm going to be doing this the rest of my life, you might as well show me how to do it." However, his illness did not keep him from becoming a star at Mead Senior High School in Spokane. In his senior year he broke single-season and career scoring records in his high school conference, and led Mead to the finals of the state tournament. Despite playing in the final game with hypoglycemia so severe that he nearly had a seizure, he scored 37 points in a losing effort. It was Mead's only loss that season. Morrison was not heavily recruited out of high school. Dave Telep of scout.com admitted, "In one of the biggest misses of my career, we left him off the Top 100 list. We ranked him the No. 26 small forward. The goal is to never make a mistake of that magnitude again".

== College career ==
Morrison arrived at Gonzaga University to play for the Gonzaga Bulldogs in 2003. In his freshman year he averaged 11.4 points per game (ppg), with a season-high 22 points against St. Mary's. Gonzaga won the West Coast Conference (WCC) regular-season title. Morrison was named to the WCC All-Freshman Team.

In his sophomore year Morrison averaged 19.0 ppg. He scored a season-high 28 points at home against San Francisco, including the winning shot with 0.6 seconds remaining in the game. Gonzaga again won the WCC regular-season title. Morrison made the All-WCC First Team and was selected to the Basketball Times All-West Coast Team as well as being named an honorable mention Associated Press All-American.

In his junior year during Gonzaga's first two games of the 2005–06 season at the Maui Invitational, Morrison played well against two of the sport's top programs. In the first round, Morrison scored 25 points in a Gonzaga win over Maryland. He followed up this performance with 43 points in a triple-overtime win over Michigan State in the semifinals. He matched that output against in-state rival Washington on December 4, 2005, in a losing effort. However, Morrison and the Zags bounced back a week later, defeating Oklahoma State after he banked in a three-pointer with 2.5 seconds left to give Gonzaga a two-point lead and eventually the win.

In the regular season, he had 13 games of 30-plus points, with five of them over 40. At 28.1 points per game, he was the nation's leading scorer in 2005–2006. His scoring totals against teams in the "major" conferences were no less impressive; he averaged 28.5 points in 11 such games. On February 18, Morrison recorded a career high 44 points (including 37 in the second half alone) against the Loyola Marymount Lions in a winning effort.

Morrison led the Zags with 24 points in a 2006 NCAA tournament Sweet Sixteen match against UCLA, which the Zags lost in the final seconds after UCLA had eliminated a 17-point deficit coming out of the first half. With seconds left, the lead having slipped away after Morrison's teammates committed 3 turnovers in less than 5 seconds, Morrison broke down in tears and collapsed to the court. He was eventually helped to his feet by UCLA player Arron Afflalo. He has been both criticized and praised for this unbridled show of emotion. He later shared the national player of the year award with friendly rival JJ Redick of Duke. The game against UCLA turned out to be Morrison's final collegiate game, as he later decided to turn pro, foregoing his senior year of college.

== Professional career ==
=== Charlotte Bobcats (2006–2009) ===
Morrison was selected third overall in the 2006 NBA draft by the Charlotte Bobcats, behind Andrea Bargnani (Toronto Raptors) and LaMarcus Aldridge (Chicago Bulls). On July 6, 2006, the Bobcats signed Morrison to a two-year contract. On November 1, 2006, in his NBA debut against the Indiana Pacers, he scored 14 points. He was the first player drafted by Michael Jordan in his tenure as Manager of Basketball Operations with the Bobcats. He scored his career high of 30 points on December 29, 2006, in a 113–102 win over the Indiana Pacers. However, Morrison lost his starting spot midway through his rookie season, in part because of his defense and because he shot only 37% for the year.

On October 21, 2007, the Bobcats announced that Morrison sustained a severe injury to his left knee in a preseason game against the L.A. Lakers while defending Luke Walton, bending his knee laterally and falling to the ground in pain. An MRI scan performed after the game indicated a torn anterior cruciate ligament (ACL). On November 10, Morrison underwent surgery to repair the damage. The injury was confirmed to be a torn ACL, requiring several months of physical therapy after the knee had healed, and Morrison missed the whole 2007–08 NBA season.

=== Los Angeles Lakers (2009–2010) ===
On February 7, 2009, Morrison and Shannon Brown were traded to the Los Angeles Lakers for Vladimir Radmanović. Morrison won NBA championships with the Lakers in 2009 and 2010, but saw very limited playing time. He was released following the 2009–10 season.

Following their 2010 Finals win over the Boston Celtics, several Lakers players appeared on the Jimmy Kimmel Show and clips were shown of Morrison watching on the bench or joining in the championship celebration while in street clothes. Kobe Bryant defended Morrison for his unselfishness in contributing to the team, considering him one of his favorite teammates. Morrison later recalled building a relationship with Bryant that continued to the end of his career, including being thankful for the star standing up for him in the face of media criticism.

=== Crvena zvezda (2011) ===
Morrison signed with the Washington Wizards in 2010, but was waived at the end of training camp before playing a regular season game.

In September 2011, Morrison signed with KK Crvena zvezda. He was released from his contract in November 2011 to pursue other opportunities. During his 8-game stay in Belgrade (he missed one away game due to a minor injury), Morrison averaged 15.5 points, 3.1 rebounds and 1.5 assists in 29 minutes a game, becoming his team's top scorer and the second overall top performer during the 2011–12 Adriatic League season.

=== Beşiktaş (2012) ===
In January 2012, Morrison signed with Beşiktaş Milangaz for the rest of the 2011–12 season. However, he left the team in April 2012 due to a lack of playing time.

After being absent from the NBA since being waived by the Wizards, Morrison played in the 2012 NBA Summer League for the Brooklyn Nets and averaged 5.2 points and 19.2 minutes in five games with the team. He then joined the Los Angeles Clippers' Summer League team, averaging 20.0 points, 5.0 rebounds and 1.0 assists on 55% FG (38–69), 61% 3-PT (13–21) and 78% FT (11–14) in 5 games.

On September 21, 2012, Morrison signed with the Portland Trail Blazers. He was waived on October 27, 2012.

== National team career ==
Morrison made four appearances for various junior U.S. national teams. Morrison was selected to train with the senior men's team in preparation for the 2006 FIBA World Championship but was cut prior to the tournament.

== Coaching career ==
In July 2013, Gonzaga basketball coach Mark Few announced that Morrison would become a student assistant with the basketball team. Morrison had returned to Gonzaga to take classes. After completing his undergraduate degree at Gonzaga in 2014, majoring in sports management, Morrison became an assistant video coordinator for the Bulldogs for the 2014–15 season, but was weighing options for his career after the season ended.

== Broadcasting career ==
Morrison was named the color commentator for the Gonzaga men's basketball radio broadcasts with former KREM 2 sports director Tom Hudson in October 2017. Since 2021 season, Morrison has hosted The Perimeter podcast, focusing on conversations with basketball and sports figures and more detailed analysis of the Gonzaga men's basketball team. The program was voted best local podcast by The Inlander in 2021. He also co-hosts the Gonzaga Nation podcast with former Bulldogs great Dan Dickau.

== Personal life ==
Morrison lives near Spokane, Washington, with his three children.

=== Diabetes ===
Morrison was diagnosed with Type 1 diabetes (insulin-dependent diabetes) at age 13. He was playing in an eighth-grade basketball game, and as the game went into overtime, he began having seizure-like symptoms, which prompted his father to take him to the hospital where the diagnosis was made. Morrison, who managed his diabetes to the point of eating exactly the same meals at the same time on game days, is considered a role model for children with the disease and their families. During his freshman year at Gonzaga, Morrison and his life with diabetes were a subject of a four-page article in Sports Illustrated. On the first day that the issue appeared in retail outlets, more than 50 parents of children with diabetes contacted the Gonzaga athletic department asking if Morrison could speak to their children. Off the court, Morrison regulates his blood sugar with an insulin pump attached to his abdomen.

== Career statistics ==
Legend
GP	Games played	GS	Games started	MPG	Minutes per game
FG%	Field goal percentage	3P%	3-point field goal percentage	FT%	Free throw percentage
RPG	Rebounds per game	APG	Assists per game	SPG	Steals per game
BPG	Blocks per game	PPG	Points per game	**Bold**	Career high
†	Won an NBA championship

=== NBA ===
==== Regular season ====
Year	Team	GP	GS	MPG	FG%	3P%	FT%	RPG	APG	SPG	BPG	PPG
2006–07	Charlotte	**78**	**23**	**29.8**	**.376**	**.337**	.710	**2.9**	**2.1**	**.4**	**.1**	**11.8**
2008–09†	Charlotte	44	5	15.2	.360	**.337**	**.762**	1.6	.9	.2	**.1**	4.5
2008–09†	L.A. Lakers	8	0	5.5	.333	.250	.500	1.0	.4	.0	.0	1.3
2009–10†	L.A. Lakers	31	0	7.8	**.376**	.238	.625	1.0	.6	.1	**.1**	2.4
Career		161	28	20.4	.373	.331	.710	2.1	1.4	.2	.1	7.5

==== Playoffs ====
Year	Team	GP	GS	MPG	FG%	3P%	FT%	RPG	APG	SPG	BPG	PPG
2010†	L.A. Lakers	2	0	6.5	.444	.000	.000	2.5	.5	.0	.0	4.0
Career		2	0	6.5	.444	.000	.000	2.5	.5	.0	.0	4.0

=== College ===
Year	Team	GP	GS	MPG	FG%	3P%	FT%	RPG	APG	SPG	BPG	PPG
2003–04	Gonzaga	31	1	20.8	**.531**	.304	.726	4.3	1.4	.4	.3	11.4
2004–05	Gonzaga	31	29	34.3	.499	.311	.758	**5.5**	**2.8**	.6	**.5**	19.0
2005–06	Gonzaga	33	32	**36.5**	.496	**.428**	**.772**	**5.5**	1.7	**1.1**	.3	**28.1**
Career		95	62	30.6	.503	.368	.761	5.1	2.0	.7	.4	19.7
