= Mark Few =

American college basketball coach (born 1962)

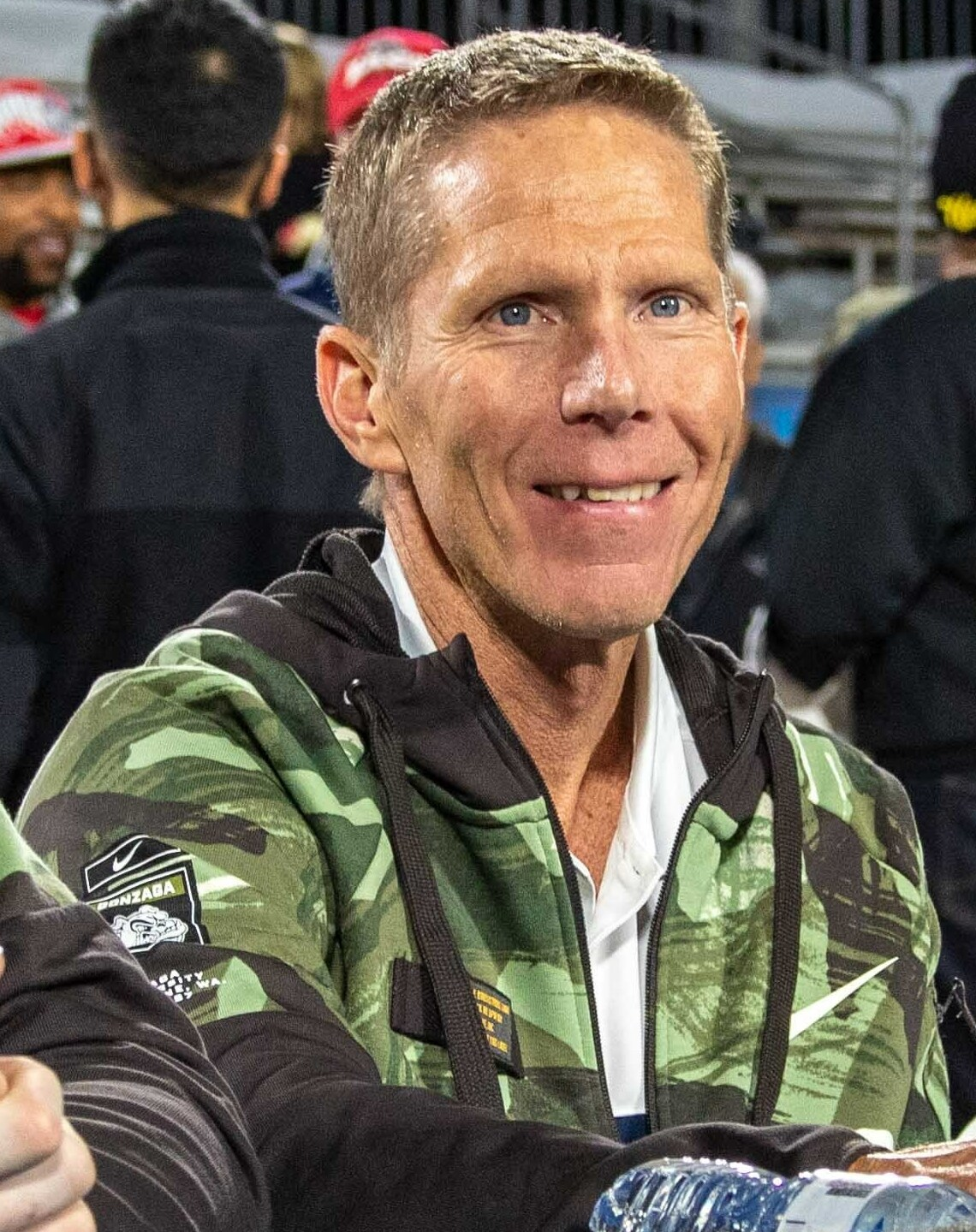
- Few in 2022

Current position
- Title: Head coach
- Team: Gonzaga
- Conference: Pac-12
- Record: 775–157 (.832)

Biographical details
- Born: December 27, 1962 (age 63); Creswell, Oregon, U.S.
- Education: Oregon (1987)

Coaching career (HC unless noted)
- 1986–1988: Creswell HS (assistant)
- 1988–1989: Sheldon HS (assistant)
- 1989–1990: Gonzaga (GA)
- 1990–1999: Gonzaga (assistant)
- 1999–present: Gonzaga

Head coaching record
- Overall: 775–157 (.832)
- Tournaments: 45–26 (NCAA Division I); 56–6 (WCC)

Accomplishments and honors

Championships
- 2 NCAA Division I Regional - Final Four (2017, 2021); 21 WCC tournament (2000–2002, 2004–2007, 2009, 2011, 2013–2018, 2020–2023, 2025-2026); 23 WCC regular season (2001–2011, 2013–2023, 2026)

Awards
- AP Coach of the Year (2017); 2× NABC Coach of the Year (2017, 2021); 2× Naismith Coach of the Year (2017, 2021); 14× WCC Coach of the Year (2001–2006, 2008, 2010, 2013, 2015, 2017–2019, 2021)
- Basketball Hall of Fame; Inducted in 2026
Medal record
Pan American Games
Head coach for the United States
Bronze medal – third place	2015 Toronto	Team
Olympic Games
Assistant coach for the United States
Gold medal – first place	2024 Paris	Team

Mark Norman Few (born December 27, 1962) is an American college basketball coach who has been the head coach at Gonzaga University since 1999 and was inducted into the Naismith Memorial Basketball Hall of Fame in 2026.

He has served on Gonzaga's coaching staff since 1989, and has led the Bulldogs from mid-major obscurity to consistent NCAA tournament contenders. During his tenure as head coach, Few has led the Bulldogs to the NCAA Tournament every season (including the cancelled 2020 tournament, when Gonzaga had secured an automatic bid), a stretch that has garnered the Bulldogs recognition as a major basketball power despite playing in a mid-major conference. In his 27 seasons as head coach, Gonzaga has reached the National Championship game twice (2017 and 2021), while winning 21 West Coast Conference tournament titles and at least a share of 23 WCC regular-season titles.

== Early life and education ==
Few was born in Creswell, Oregon and was a star point guard at Creswell High School, graduating in 1981. He originally attended Linfield College, hoping to play basketball and baseball but he was troubled by the after-effects of a dislocated shoulder he suffered while playing football as a senior at Creswell. He then transferred to the University of Oregon, hoping to play baseball there but the Ducks had dropped their varsity baseball program by the time he arrived in Eugene. He graduated from Oregon with a BS in physical education in 1987.

== Coaching career ==
=== Early career ===
Few entered the coaching profession even before receiving his degree, serving as an unpaid part-time assistant at his alma mater of Creswell High School starting in 1983, and advancing to a paid position from 1986 to 1988. During this time, he also worked at Oregon's summer basketball camps. He then worked as an assistant at Sheldon High School in Eugene for one season.

=== Gonzaga ===
==== Assistant coach ====
In 1989, Few moved to Spokane, Washington, joining the Gonzaga staff as a graduate assistant under Dan Fitzgerald. He had some familiarity with the program, as he had befriended Dan Monson, then a Gonzaga assistant and later the head coach, during his time working the Oregon basketball camps. In 1990, he was promoted to a full-time assistant. As an assistant, Few helped lead Gonzaga to its first four postseason appearances—the 1994, 1996, and 1998 National Invitation Tournaments and the 1995 NCAA tournament.

In April 1999, Monson, who had just finished his second year as Gonzaga head coach, promoted Few to associate head coach. This was immediately following the season in which Gonzaga became the nation's basketball darlings, making a run through the NCAA tournament, defeating Minnesota, Stanford, and Florida, to advance to the Elite Eight. In the West Regional finals Gonzaga lost to eventual national champions UConn by five points. When Monson left in late July to take the open head coaching job at Minnesota, Few, who had been designated as Monson's successor, was promoted to head coach.

==== Head coach ====
Taking over after Monson's abrupt departure, Few managed to sustain the Gonzaga program's success from his very first season, ensuring the Bulldogs did not fade into obscurity. He guided them to the NCAA Sweet Sixteen in his first two years, becoming only the second head coach in the nation to accomplish this feat since the NCAA tournament expanded to 64 teams in 1985. The following year (2001–02), Few set an all-time record for NCAA Division I men's coaches by collecting 81 wins in his first three years as a head coach. The record stood until 2010 when Brad Stevens of Butler surpassed it. In 2017, Mark Few became the third fastest coach to reach 500 wins in NCAA Division I history. The program's success has continued as Gonzaga has made the NCAA tournament in every one of Few's 21 completed seasons; indeed, he has been on hand for every postseason appearance in school history. The Bulldogs have also advanced to the WCC tournament title game in every season during Few's tenure. The Zags have won their way to every WCC Tournament championship game since 1998, and all but one since 1995.

With Few as head coach, the Gonzaga program produced its first seven first-team All-Americans in Dan Dickau, Adam Morrison, Kelly Olynyk, Nigel Williams-Goss, Rui Hachimura, Corey Kispert, and Drew Timme. All seven have played in the NBA, along with Richie Frahm, Blake Stepp, Ronny Turiaf, Austin Daye, Jeremy Pargo, Robert Sacre, Elias Harris, Kevin Pangos, David Stockton, Domantas Sabonis, Kyle Wiltjer, Zach Collins, Johnathan Williams, Brandon Clarke, Zach Norvell, Killian Tillie, Joel Ayayi, Andrew Nembhard, Jalen Suggs, Chet Holmgren, Julian Strawther, and Anton Watson.

Few was named the West Coast Conference coach of the year for six consecutive seasons (2001 through 2006).

The 2006–07 season posed a number of challenges to Few and the Bulldogs:

- Adam Morrison, a first-team All-America in 2005–06, chose to leave Gonzaga for the NBA with a year of eligibility left.
- The Zags played an especially brutal nonconference schedule, with no fewer than nine opponents that would make the NCAA tournament.
- The team's second-leading scorer and leading rebounder in 2006–07, Josh Heytvelt, was suspended after being arrested on drug charges in February 2007, and did not play again during the season.

The Zags ended the regular season at 21–10, their first season with double digits in losses since 1997–98, which was also the last season to date in which they failed to make the NCAA tournament. It had generally been thought that Gonzaga would have to win the WCC tournament to earn a bid to the NCAA tournament. However, Gonzaga would go on to win the conference tournament, notably beating a Santa Clara team in the final that had earlier handed the Zags their first home-court loss in nearly four years. They would go out in the first round of the NCAA tournament to Indiana.

A year later, despite losing to San Diego in the conference title game, the Bulldogs garnered an at-large bid in the NCAA Tournament.

On March 21, 2009, Few notched his 254th win as Gonzaga's head coach with a second-round victory in the NCAA Tournament, passing his former boss Fitzgerald as the winningest coach in school history.

During the 2012–13 season, Few led the Bulldogs to the No. 2 ranking in both major polls, the highest national ranking at the time in school history. Few broke that record a week later when the Bulldogs surged to No. 1 in both polls for the first time. It was also the first time a WCC school had ascended to the top spot since San Francisco in 1977. Gonzaga went on to receive its first No. 1 seed in the NCAA Tournament in school history, as well as a then school-record 32 wins.

During the 2014–15 season, Few led the Zags back to the No. 2 ranking in both major polls, along with a then school-record 22-game winning streak. Few guided Gonzaga to a No. 2 seed in the NCAA Tournament, his first Elite Eight appearance as head coach, and a then school-record 35 wins.

In 2016–17, Few led the Zags to arguably their greatest season up to that point in school history. They stormed through the regular season, starting with a school-record 29-game winning streak, which also broke the record for consecutive wins to start a season. By February, they had surged back to No. 1 in the polls. The winning streak and No. 1 ranking were lost when the Bulldogs lost to BYU on February 25. As it turned out, it would be the Bulldogs' only loss of the regular season. Gonzaga went on to receive a No. 1 seed in the NCAA Tournament for the second time in school history, and advanced to the Final Four for the first time in school history, losing to North Carolina in the National Championship. The Zags set a new school record with 37 wins, which was also tied for the second-most wins in NCAA Division I history. They also made the deepest NCAA Tournament run by a WCC team since San Francisco reached three consecutive Final Fours from 1955 to 1957.

Few was named as the National Coach of the Year in 2016–17 by the Associated Press, Naismith, and the USBWA, awarded with the Henry Iba Award.

In 2018–19, Few's No. 3 Gonzaga team defeated No. 1 Duke 89–87 in the Maui Invitational final to beat Duke for the first time and to beat a top-ranked team for the first time in team history.

During the COVID-19-shortened 2020–21 season, Few led Gonzaga to its first-ever undefeated regular and conference season at 26–0, he also ended the season with the longest current home win streak, a school record, at 51 games. It also marked the first time in school history that the Zags were ranked No. 1 in both the Associated Press and Collegiate Coaches Polls for the entire season. Few also continued his consecutive conference tournament championship win streaks with 8, making him the only coach in NCAA history to reach 8 or more twice in his career. Few ended the season by breaking his old school record of 29 by winning 31 straight games from the start of the season before losing in the NCAA Championship game.

== National team career ==
Few was the head coach of the United States national team at the 2015 Pan American Games, where he led the US to a bronze medal.

In 2019, Few was elected as the assistant coach of the national select team, a 13-player squad that helps the national team training. He helped the national team prepare for the 2019 FIBA Basketball World Cup.

On December 20, 2021, Few was announced as an assistant coach for the 2022-24 USA National Team. As assistant coach, he helped lead the USA Men's National Team through 2024, including training camps, exhibitions, the 2023 FIBA World Cup and at the 2024 Paris Summer Olympics.

== Personal life ==
Few and his wife Marcy were married by his father in 1994 and have three sons and one daughter. They have organized a charity golf tournament under the Coaches vs. Cancer umbrella, and since the tournament began in 2002, have raised over $1 million for the American Cancer Society.

Few is an avid fly fisherman.

In 2021, Few served a three-game suspension from his coaching position at Gonzaga following an arrest for DUI.

== Awards, records and achievements ==
=== NCAA ===
Highest winning percentage (minimum 600 games) : .832

Most consecutive tournament appearances since starting as head coach : 27

Only Coach to win 8 or more consecutive conference championships twice

3rd Fastest Coach to 500 Games (Adolph Rupp – 1st, Jerry Tarkanian – 2nd)

3rd Fastest Coach to 600 Games (Adolph Rupp – 1st, Jerry Tarkanian – 2nd)

2nd most wins in first 3 seasons (Brad Stevens)

2nd most wins in a season with 37 (Tied with Mike Krzyzewski twice, Bill Self, Bruce Weber & Jerry Tarkanian have one each) (John Calipari has 38, three times)

=== West Coast Conference ===
Only coach to receive the Henry Iba Award in WCC

Most consecutive seasons named WCC coach of the year: 6

Most seasons named WCC coach of the year: 14

Most WCC regular season wins: 374

Most consecutive WCC regular season wins: 40

Most consecutive WCC regular season road wins: 39

Most WCC regular season championships: 23

Most WCC tournament wins: 47

Most WCC tournament championships: 21

Most Consecutive WCC tournament championships: 11

=== Gonzaga ===
Most wins in school history: 774

Most undefeated regular seasons: 1 (26–0)

Most wins in a season: 37

Best Season 31–1

Most consecutive wins to start a season: 31 (Few also holds the No. 2 spot at 29)

Most consecutive wins: 31

Longest home court winning streak: 75

Most NCAA tournament appearances: 27

Most NCAA tournament wins: 45

Most NCAA championship game appearances: 2

Most final 4 appearances: 2

Most elite 8 appearances: 5

Most sweet 16 appearances: 12

Most round of 32 appearances: 20

== Head coaching record ==
Record table
Season	Team	Overall	Conference	Standing	Postseason
Gonzaga Bulldogs (West Coast Conference) (1999–2026)
1999–2000	Gonzaga	26–9	11–3	2nd	NCAA Division I Sweet 16
2000–01	Gonzaga	26–7	13–1	1st	NCAA Division I Sweet 16
2001–02	Gonzaga	29–4	13–1	T–1st	NCAA Division I Round of 64
2002–03	Gonzaga	24–9	12–2	1st	NCAA Division I Round of 32
2003–04	Gonzaga	28–3	14–0	1st	NCAA Division I Round of 32
2004–05	Gonzaga	26–5	12–2	1st	NCAA Division I Round of 32
2005–06	Gonzaga	29–4	14–0	1st	NCAA Division I Sweet 16
2006–07	Gonzaga	23–11	11–3	1st	NCAA Division I Round of 64
2007–08	Gonzaga	25–8	13–1	1st	NCAA Division I Round of 64
2008–09	Gonzaga	28–6	14–0	1st	NCAA Division I Sweet 16
2009–10	Gonzaga	27–7	12–2	1st	NCAA Division I Round of 32
2010–11	Gonzaga	25–10	11–3	T–1st	NCAA Division I Round of 32
2011–12	Gonzaga	26–7	13–3	2nd	NCAA Division I Round of 32
2012–13	Gonzaga	32–3	16–0	1st	NCAA Division I Round of 32
2013–14	Gonzaga	29–7	15–3	1st	NCAA Division I Round of 32
2014–15	Gonzaga	35–3	17–1	1st	NCAA Division I Elite Eight
2015–16	Gonzaga	28–8	15–3	T–1st	NCAA Division I Sweet 16
2016–17	Gonzaga	37–2	17–1	1st	NCAA Division I Runner-up
2017–18	Gonzaga	32–5	17–1	1st	NCAA Division I Sweet 16
2018–19	Gonzaga	33–4	16–0	1st	NCAA Division I Elite Eight
2019–20	Gonzaga	31–2	15–1	1st	NCAA Tournament canceled due to COVID-19
2020–21	Gonzaga	31–1	15–0	1st	NCAA Division I Runner-up
2021–22	Gonzaga	28–4	13–1	1st	NCAA Division I Sweet 16
2022–23	Gonzaga	31–6	14–2	T–1st	NCAA Division I Elite Eight
2023–24	Gonzaga	27–8	14–2	2nd	NCAA Division I Sweet 16
2024–25	Gonzaga	26–9	14–4	2nd	NCAA Division I Round of 32
2025–26	Gonzaga	31–4	16–2	T–1st	NCAA Division I Round of 32
Gonzaga Bulldogs (Pac-12) (2026–present)
2026–27	Gonzaga	3–1	0–0		
Gonzaga:		775–157 (.832)	374–41 (.901)		
Total:		775–157 (.832)			
National champion Postseason invitational champion Conference regular season champion Conference regular season and conference tournament champion Division regular season champion Division regular season and conference tournament champion Conference tournament champion

== See also ==
- List of college men's basketball coaches with 600 wins
- List of NCAA Division I Men's Final Four appearances by coach
