= 2018–19 Gonzaga Bulldogs men's basketball team =

American college basketball season

2018–19 Gonzaga Bulldogs men's basketball

WCC regular season champions Maui Invitational champions

NCAA tournament, Elite Eight
- Conference: West Coast Conference

Ranking
- Coaches: No. 6
- AP: No. 4
- Record: 33–4 (16–0 WCC)
- Head coach: Mark Few (20th season)
- Assistant coaches: Tommy Lloyd (18th season); Donny Daniels (9th season); Brian Michaelson (6th season)
- Home arena: McCarthey Athletic Center

2018–19 West Coast Conference men's basketball standings
	Conf.				Overall
Team	W		L	PCT	W		L	PCT
No. 4 Gonzaga	16	–	0	1.000	33	–	4	.892
Saint Mary's †	11	–	5	.688	22	–	12	.647
BYU	11	–	5	.688	19	–	13	.594
San Francisco	9	–	7	.563	21	–	10	.677
Loyola Marymount	8	–	8	.500	22	–	12	.647
Santa Clara	8	–	8	.500	16	–	15	.516
San Diego	7	–	9	.438	21	–	15	.583
Pepperdine	6	–	10	.375	16	–	18	.471
Pacific	4	–	12	.250	14	–	18	.438
Portland	0	–	16	.000	7	–	25	.219
† 2019 WCC tournament winner Rankings from AP Poll

The 2018–19 Gonzaga Bulldogs men's basketball team (also informally referred to as the Zags) represented Gonzaga University, located in Spokane, Washington. in the 2018–19 NCAA Division I men's basketball season. The team was led by head coach Mark Few, in his 20th season as head coach. This was the Bulldogs' 15th season at the on-campus McCarthey Athletic Center and 39th season as a member of the West Coast Conference. They finished the season 33–4, 16-0 to finish in 1st place. In the WCC Tournament, they defeated Pepperdine in the semifinals before losing in the championship game to Saint Mary’s. They received an at-large bid to the NCAA Tournament where they defeated Fairleigh Dickinson, Baylor and Florida State to make the Elite Eight. In the Elite Eight, they lost to Texas Tech.

== Previous season ==
The Bulldogs team finished the 2017–18 season 32–5, 17–1 in WCC play to win the WCC regular season championship. They defeated Loyola Marymount, San Francisco and BYU to become champions of the WCC tournament. They received the WCC's automatic bid to the NCAA tournament where they defeated UNC Greensboro and Ohio State to advance to the Sweet Sixteen where they lost to Florida State.

== Offseason ==
=== Coaching changes ===
==== Additions to staff ====
Name	Position	Year at Gonzaga	Alma Mater (year)	Previous Job
Ken Nakagawa	Video coordinator	3rd	Long Beach State (2014)	Graduate Assistant at Gonzaga
Jorge Sanz	Graduate Assistant	1st	Florida Atlantic (2011)	Assistant coach at Florida Atlantic

=== Player departures ===
Name	Number	Pos.	Height	Weight	Year	Hometown	Reason for departure
Johnathan Williams	3	F	6'9"	228	Senior (Redshirt)	Memphis, TN	Graduated
Silas Melson	0	G	6'4"	195	Senior	Portland, OR	Graduated
Jacob Larsen	14	F	6'11"	235	Freshman (Redshirt)	Holte, Denmark	Left team
Jesse Wade	10	G	6'1"	175	Freshman	Kaysville, UT	Transferred to BYU

=== Incoming transfers ===
Name	Pos.	Height	Weight	Year	Hometown	Previous School	Years Remaining	Date Eligible
Geno Crandall	G	6'4"	185	Senior (redshirt)	Minneapolis, MN	North Dakota	1	Oct. 12, 2018

=== 2018 recruiting class ===
College recruiting information
Name	Hometown	School	Height	Weight	Commit date
Filip Petrušev; PF	Belgrade, Serbia	Montverde Academy	6 ft 10 in (2.08 m)	215 lb (98 kg)	Oct 22, 2017
Filip Petrušev; PF	Recruit ratings: Scout: Rivals: 247Sports: ESPN:				
Greg Foster; SG	Thiensville, WI	Ed W. Clark High School	6 ft 5 in (1.96 m)	174 lb (79 kg)	Nov 8, 2017
Greg Foster; SG	Recruit ratings: Scout: Rivals: 247Sports: ESPN:				
Overall recruit ranking:
Note: In many cases, Scout, Rivals, 247Sports, On3, and ESPN may conflict in their listings of height and weight.; In these cases, the average was taken. ESPN grades are on a 100-point scale.; Sources: "Gonzaga Commit List for 2018". Rivals.; "2018 Team Ranking". Rivals.

== Future recruits ==
=== Recruiting class of 2019 ===
College recruiting information (2019)
Name	Hometown	School	Height	Weight	Commit date
Anton Watson; SF/PF	Spokane, WA	Gonzaga Preparatory School	6 ft 9 in (2.06 m)	210 lb (95 kg)	Jun 21, 2017
Anton Watson; SF/PF	Recruit ratings: Rivals: 247Sports: ESPN:				
Brock Ravet; PG	Kittitas, WA	Kittitas High School	6 ft 1 in (1.85 m)	174 lb (79 kg)	Jun 23, 2017
Brock Ravet; PG	Recruit ratings: Rivals: 247Sports: ESPN:				
Martynas Arlauskas; SF	Kaunas, Lithuania	BC Žalgiris	6 ft 7 in (2.01 m)	195 lb (88 kg)	Sep 20, 2018
Martynas Arlauskas; SF	Recruit ratings: Rivals: 247Sports: ESPN:				
Drew Timme; PF/C	Richardson, TX	Pearce High School	6 ft 10 in (2.08 m)	225 lb (102 kg)	Nov 14, 2018
Drew Timme; PF/C	Recruit ratings: Rivals: 247Sports: ESPN:				
Pavel Zakharov; C	Saint Petersburg, Russia	Montverde Academy, Montverde, FL	6 ft 10 in (2.08 m)	235 lb (107 kg)	Nov 19, 2018
Pavel Zakharov; C	Recruit ratings: Rivals: 247Sports: ESPN:				
Oumar Ballo; C	Mali	NBA Academy Latin America, Mexico City	6 ft 10 in (2.08 m)	245 lb (111 kg)	Feb 23, 2019
Oumar Ballo; C	Recruit ratings: Rivals: 247Sports: ESPN:				
Overall recruit ranking:
Note: In many cases, Scout, Rivals, 247Sports, On3, and ESPN may conflict in their listings of height and weight.; In these cases, the average was taken. ESPN grades are on a 100-point scale.; Sources: "Gonzaga Commit List for 2019". Rivals.; "2019 Team Ranking". Rivals.

=== Recruiting class of 2020 ===
College recruiting information (2020)
Name	Hometown	School	Height	Weight	Commit date
Dominick Harris; CG	Temecula, CA	Rancho Christian High School	6 ft 4 in (1.93 m)	190 lb (86 kg)	Jan 28, 2018
Dominick Harris; CG	Recruit ratings: Rivals: 247Sports: ESPN:				
Overall recruit ranking:
Note: In many cases, Scout, Rivals, 247Sports, On3, and ESPN may conflict in their listings of height and weight.; In these cases, the average was taken. ESPN grades are on a 100-point scale.; Sources: "Gonzaga Commit List for 2020". Rivals.; "2020 Team Ranking". Rivals.

== Roster ==
2018–19 Gonzaga Bulldogs men's basketball team
Players
Coaches

Pos.	#	Name	Height	Weight	Year	Previous school	Hometown
F	22	Jeremy Jones	6 ft 7 in (2.01 m)	213 lb (97 kg)	RS Sr	East Central; Rice	San Antonio, TX
G	13	Josh Perkins	6 ft 3 in (1.91 m)	190 lb (86 kg)	RS Sr	Huntington Prep	Park Hill, CO
G	0	Geno Crandall	6 ft 4 in (1.93 m)	185 lb (84 kg)	RS Sr	DeLaSalle; North Dakota	Minneapolis, MN
F	15	Brandon Clarke	6 ft 8 in (2.03 m)	215 lb (98 kg)	RS Jr	Desert Vista; San Jose State	Phoenix, AZ
G	2	Jack Beach (W)	6 ft 3 in (1.91 m)	180 lb (82 kg)	RS Jr	Torrey Pines	San Diego, CA
G	5	Alex Martin (W)	6 ft 5 in (1.96 m)	205 lb (93 kg)	RS Jr	Blue Valley; Belmont; Johnson County CC	Overland Park, KS
F	33	Killian Tillie	6 ft 10 in (2.08 m)	220 lb (100 kg)	Jr	INSEP	Cagnes-sur-Mer, France
F	21	Rui Hachimura	6 ft 8 in (2.03 m)	230 lb (104 kg)	Jr	Meisei	Toyama, Japan
G	23	Zach Norvell	6 ft 5 in (1.96 m)	205 lb (93 kg)	RS So	Simeon	Chicago, IL
F	24	Corey Kispert	6 ft 6 in (1.98 m)	215 lb (98 kg)	So	King's	Edmonds, WA
G	11	Joël Ayayi	6 ft 5 in (1.96 m)	180 lb (82 kg)	RS Fr	INSEP	Bordeaux, France
F	3	Filip Petrušev	6 ft 11 in (2.11 m)	225 lb (102 kg)	Fr	Montverde Academy	Belgrade, Serbia
G	4	Greg Foster	6 ft 5 in (1.96 m)	195 lb (88 kg)	Fr	Ed W. Clark	Milwaukee, WI
G	10	Matthew Lang (W)	6 ft 3 in (1.91 m)	185 lb (84 kg)	Fr	Jesuit	Portland, OR
G	20	Paul Pennington (W) (redshirt)	5 ft 10 in (1.78 m)	160 lb (73 kg)	Fr	Boise	Boise, ID

Head coach

- Mark Few (Oregon)

Assistant coach(es)

- Tommy Lloyd (Whitman)
- Donny Daniels (Cal State Fullerton)
- Brian Michaelson (Gonzaga)

Legend

- (C) Team captain
- (S) Suspended
- (I) Ineligible
- (W) Walk-on
- Injured
- Current redshirt

Roster
Last update: January 5, 2019

- Roster is subject to change as/if players transfer or leave the program for other reasons.

=== Coaching staff ===
Name	Position	Year at Gonzaga	Alma Mater (year)
Mark Few	Head coach	20th	Oregon (1987)
Tommy Lloyd	Associate head coach	18th	Whitman (1998)
Donny Daniels	Assistant coach	9th	Cal State Fullerton (1976)
Brian Michaelson	Assistant coach	6th	Gonzaga (2005)
Jorge Sanz	Graduate Assistant	1st	Florida Atlantic (2011)
Stephen Gentry	Director of Basketball Operations	2nd	Gonzaga (2006)
Riccardo Fois	Coordinator of Analytics & Video Operations	5th	Pepperdine (2009)
Ken Nakagawa	Video coordinator	3rd	Long Beach State (2014)
Josh Therrien	Athletic Trainer	3rd	Washington State (2007)
Travis Knight	Strength and Conditioning Coach	13th	Gonzaga (2000)

== Schedule and results ==
Date time, TV	Rank^{#}	Opponent^{#}	Result	Record	High points	High rebounds	High assists	Site (attendance) city, state
Exhibition
November 1, 2018*; 6:00 pm, KHQ	No. 3	Central Washington	W 108–69	–	23 – Hachimura	11 – Clarke	4 – Crandall	McCarthey Athletic Center (6,000); Spokane, WA
Non-conference regular season
November 6, 2018*; 6:00 pm, KHQ/RTNW	No. 3	Idaho State	W 120–79	1–0	33 – Hachimura	9 – Clarke	8 – Perkins	McCarthey Athletic Center (6,000); Spokane, WA
November 10, 2018*; 7:00 pm, SWX/RTNW	No. 3	Texas Southern; Maui Invitational campus-site game	W 104–67	2–0	19 – Tied	13 – Clarke	11 – Perkins	McCarthey Athletic Center (6,000); Spokane, WA
November 15, 2018*; 8:30 pm, ESPN2	No. 3	Texas A&M	W 91–74	3–0	22 – Norvell Jr.	11 – Clarke	6 – Perkins	McCarthey Athletic Center (6,000); Spokane, WA
November 19, 2018*; 8:30 pm, ESPN2	No. 3	vs. Illinois; Maui Invitational Quarterfinals	W 84–78	4–0	23 – Hachimura	11 – Jones	9 – Perkins	Lahaina Civic Center (2,400); Maui, HI
November 20, 2018*; 7:00 pm, ESPN	No. 3	vs. Arizona; Maui Invitational Semifinals	W 91–74	5–0	24 – Hachimura	10 – Norvell Jr.	9 – Perkins	Lahaina Civic Center (2,400); Maui, HI
November 21, 2018*; 2:00 pm, ESPN	No. 3	vs. No. 1 Duke; Maui Invitational Championship	W 89–87	6–0	20 – Hachimura	7 – Hachimura	7 – Perkins	Lahaina Civic Center (2,400); Maui, HI
November 26, 2018*; 6:00 pm, KHQ/RTNW	No. 1	North Dakota State	W 102–60	7–0	18 – Tied	8 – Clarke	8 – Norvell Jr.	McCarthey Athletic Center (6,000); Spokane, WA
December 1, 2018*; 11:00 am, FOX	No. 1	at Creighton	W 103–92	8–0	28 – Norvell Jr.	11 – Hachimura	13 – Perkins	CHI Health Center Omaha (18,759); Omaha, NE
December 5, 2018*; 8:00 pm, ESPN2	No. 1	Washington; Rivalry	W 81–79	9–0	26 – Hachimura	11 – Clarke	7 – Norvell	McCarthey Athletic Center (6,000); Spokane, WA
December 9, 2018*; 12:00 pm, ESPN	No. 1	vs. No. 7 Tennessee; Jerry Colangelo Classic	L 73–76	9–1	21 – Tied	9 – Tied	9 – Perkins	Talking Stick Resort Arena (10,172); Phoenix, AZ
December 15, 2018*; 4:00 pm, ESPN2	No. 4	at No. 12 North Carolina	L 90–103	9–2	21 – Norvell Jr.	7 – Hachimura	8 – Perkins	Dean Smith Center (21,750); Chapel Hill, NC
December 18, 2018*; 6:00 pm, KHQ/RTNW	No. 8	UT Arlington	W 89–55	10–2	20 – Hachimura	13 – Clarke	4 – Tied	McCarthey Athletic Center (6,000); Spokane, WA
December 21, 2018*; 6:00 pm, KHQ/RTNW	No. 8	Denver	W 101–40	11–2	23 – Tied	7 – Clarke	5 – Jones	McCarthey Athletic Center (6,000); Spokane, WA
December 28, 2018*; 6:00 pm, KHQ/RTNW	No. 7	North Alabama	W 96–51	12–2	20 – Norvell Jr.	12 – Clarke	5 – Norvell Jr.	McCarthey Athletic Center (6,000); Spokane, WA
December 31, 2018*; 6:00 pm, KHQ/RTNW	No. 7	Cal State Bakersfield	W 89–54	13–2	22 – Hachimura	10 – Jones	5 – Norvell Jr.	McCarthey Athletic Center (6,000); Spokane, WA
WCC Regular Season
January 5, 2019; 6:00 pm, KHQ/RTNW	No. 7	Santa Clara	W 91–48	14–2 (1–0)	25 – Hachimura	6 – Clarke	5 – Tied	McCarthey Athletic Center (6,000); Spokane, WA
January 10, 2019; 8:00 pm, ESPN2	No. 5	Pacific	W 67–36	15–2 (2–0)	14 – Perkins	8 – Clarke	6 – Perkins	McCarthey Athletic Center (6,000); Spokane, WA
January 12, 2019; 7:00 pm, ESPN2	No. 5	at San Francisco	W 96–83	16–2 (3–0)	24 – Clarke	9 – Clarke	4 – Perkins	War Memorial Gymnasium (3,008); San Francisco, CA
January 17, 2019; 6:00 pm, KHQ/RTNW	No. 5	Loyola Marymount	W 73–55	17–2 (4–0)	17 – Norvell	7 – Hachimura	4 – Tied	McCarthey Athletic Center (6,000); Spokane, WA
January 19, 2019; 7:00 pm, RTNW	No. 5	at Portland	W 89–66	18–2 (5–0)	17 – Hachimura	9 – Hachimura	7 – Perkins	Chiles Center (4,852); Portland, OR
January 24, 2019; 8:00 pm, SWX/RTNW	No. 4	at Santa Clara	W 98–39	19–2 (6–0)	18 – Perkins	8 – Norvell	8 – Perkins	Leavey Center (5,094); Santa Clara, CA
January 31, 2019; 8:00 pm, ESPN2	No. 4	at BYU; Rivalry	W 93–63	20–2 (7–0)	23 – Clarke	9 – Tied	10 – Perkins	Marriott Center (15,396); Provo, UT
February 2, 2019; 5:00 pm, KHQ/RTNW	No. 4	San Diego	W 85–69	21–2 (8–0)	32 – Hachimura	8 – Clarke	6 – Perkins	McCarthey Athletic Center (6,000); Spokane, WA
February 7, 2019; 6:00 pm, KHQ/RTNW	No. 4	San Francisco	W 92–62	22–2 (9–0)	20 – Clarke	16 – Clarke	7 – Perkins	McCarthey Athletic Center (6,000); Spokane, WA
February 9, 2019; 7:00 pm, ESPN2	No. 4	Saint Mary's; Rivalry	W 94–46	23–2 (10–0)	24 – Clarke	7 – Hachimura	9 – Perkins	McCarthey Athletic Center (6,000); Spokane, WA
February 14, 2019; 8:00 pm, ESPN2	No. 3	at Loyola Marymount	W 73–60	24–2 (11–0)	22 – Hachimura	12 – Clarke	4 – Tied	Gersten Pavilion (4,213); Los Angeles, CA
February 16, 2019; 7:00 pm, ESPN	No. 3	at San Diego	W 79–67	25–2 (12–0)	22 – Hachimura	10 – Hachimura	9 – Perkins	Jenny Craig Pavilion (5,132); San Diego, CA
February 21, 2019; 6:00 pm, KHQ/RTNW	No. 2	Pepperdine	W 92–64	26–2 (13–0)	23 – Hachimura	11 – Clarke	9 – Perkins	McCarthey Athletic Center (6,000); Spokane, WA
February 23, 2019; 7:00 pm, ESPN	No. 2	BYU; Rivalry	W 102–68	27–2 (14–0)	25 – Norvell	10 – Clarke, Hachimura	7 – Perkins	McCarthey Athletic Center (6,000); Spokane, WA
February 28, 2019; 8:00 pm, ESPN2	No. 1	at Pacific	W 86–66	28–2 (15–0)	27 – Hachimura	13 – Clarke	2 – Tied	Alex G. Spanos Center (4,644); Stockton, CA
March 2, 2019; 7:00 pm, ESPN	No. 1	at Saint Mary's; Rivalry	W 69–55	29–2 (16–0)	19 – Perkins	8 – Hachimura	3 – Norvell	McKeon Pavilion (3,500); Moraga, CA
WCC Tournament
March 11, 2019; 6:00 pm, ESPN	(1) No. 1	vs. (8) Pepperdine; Semifinals	W 100–74	30–2	18 – Norvell	7 – Clarke	6 – Perkins	Orleans Arena (7,642); Paradise, NV
March 12, 2019; 9:00 pm, ESPN	(1) No. 1	vs. (2) Saint Mary's; Championship/Rivalry	L 47–60	30–3	16 – Clarke	8 – Clarke	4 – Perkins	Orleans Arena (7,771); Paradise, NV
NCAA tournament
March 21, 2019*; 7:27 pm, truTV	(1 W) No. 4	vs. (16 W) Fairleigh Dickinson; First Round	W 87–49	31–3	21 – Hachimura	9 – Clarke	7 – Norvell Jr.	Vivint Smart Home Arena (16,807); Salt Lake City, UT
March 23, 2019*; 4:10 pm, TBS	(1 W) No. 4	vs. (9 W) Baylor; Second Round	W 83–71	32–3	36 – Clarke	8 – Clarke	6 – Perkins	Vivint Smart Home Arena (17,792); Salt Lake City, UT
March 28, 2019*; 4:09 pm, CBS	(1 W) No. 4	vs. (4 W) No. 10 Florida State; Sweet Sixteen	W 72–58	33–3	17 – Hachimura	12 – Clarke	5 – Perkins	Honda Center (16,145); Anaheim, CA
March 30, 2019*; 5:09 pm, TBS	(1 W) No. 4	vs. (3 W) No. 9 Texas Tech; Elite Eight	L 69–75	33–4	22 – Hachimura	12 – Clarke	6 – Perkins	Honda Center (15,277); Anaheim, CA
*Non-conference game. ^{#}Rankings from AP Poll. (#) Tournament seedings in parentheses. W=West. All times are in Pacific Time.

== Rankings ==
Ranking movements Legend: ██ Increase in ranking ██ Decrease in ranking ( ) = First-place votes
	Week																				
Poll	Pre	1	2	3	4	5	6	7	8	9	10	11	12	13	14	15	16	17	18	19	Final
AP	3 (1)	3	3	1 (32)	1 (43)	4 (1)	8	7	7	5	5	4	4	4	3	2 (6)	1 (44)	1 (42)	1 (41)	4 (1)	Not released
Coaches	4 (1)	4^ (1)	3	1 (17)	1 (21)	6 (1)	9	8	8	6	5	4	4	4	3	2 (4)	1 (26)	1 (27)	1 (28)	3 (3)	6

*AP does not release post-NCAA Tournament rankings.
^Coaches did not release a Week 2 poll.
