= 2018–19 San Diego Toreros men's basketball team =

American college basketball season

2018–19 San Diego Toreros men's basketball

NIT, First Round
- Conference: West Coast Conference
- Record: 21–15 (7–9 WCC)
- Head coach: Sam Scholl (1st season)
- Assistant coaches: David Carter; Chris Gerlufsen; Terrence Rencher
- Home arena: Jenny Craig Pavilion

2018–19 West Coast Conference men's basketball standings
	Conf.				Overall
Team	W		L	PCT	W		L	PCT
No. 4 Gonzaga	16	–	0	1.000	33	–	4	.892
Saint Mary's †	11	–	5	.688	22	–	12	.647
BYU	11	–	5	.688	19	–	13	.594
San Francisco	9	–	7	.563	21	–	10	.677
Loyola Marymount	8	–	8	.500	22	–	12	.647
Santa Clara	8	–	8	.500	16	–	15	.516
San Diego	7	–	9	.438	21	–	15	.583
Pepperdine	6	–	10	.375	16	–	18	.471
Pacific	4	–	12	.250	14	–	18	.438
Portland	0	–	16	.000	7	–	25	.219
† 2019 WCC tournament winner Rankings from AP Poll

The 2018–19 San Diego Toreros men's basketball team represented the University of San Diego during the 2018–19 NCAA Division I men's basketball season. The Toreros were led by first-year head coach Sam Scholl. They played their home games at the Jenny Craig Pavilion in San Diego, California, as members of the West Coast Conference. They finished the season 21–15, 7–9 to finish in 7th place. As the No. 7 seed in the WCC Tournament, they defeated Portland, Santa Clara and BYU to advance to the semifinals where they lost to Saint Mary's. They received an at-large bid to the NIT where they lost in the first round to Memphis.

== Previous season ==
The Toreros finished the 2017–18 season 20–14, 9–9 in WCC play to finish in a three-way tie for fourth place. They lost to BYU in the quarterfinals of the WCC tournament. The Toreros were invited to the CollegeInsider.com Tournament where they defeated Hartford in the first round, in a game referred to as the Riley Wallace Classic, and Portland State in the second round before losing in the quarterfinals to Northern Colorado.

On March 8, 2018, head coach Lamont Smith, who had been placed on administrative leave following an arrest for domestic violence 10 days earlier, resigned as head coach. Assistant coach Sam Scholl took over as acting head coach for the Toreros during the WCC Tournament and the CIT. On April 2, the school announced Scholl would remain the head coach.

== Offseason ==
=== Departures ===
Name	Number	Pos.	Height	Weight	Year	Hometown	Reason for departure
Juwan Gray	12	F	6'8"	190	Sophomore	Dover, DE	Transferred to Towson
Cameron Naubauer	20	F	6'7"	220	Senior	Berlin, Germany	Graduated
Hunter Summy	21	G	6'4"	180	RS Sophomore	Southlake, TX	Walk-on; left the team for personal reasons
Vinny Ferrari	31	G	5'11"	175	RS Freshman	Burlingame, CA	Walk-on; left the team for personal reasons

=== 2018 recruiting class ===
College recruiting information
Name	Hometown	School	Height	Weight	Commit date
Finn Sullivan; SG	San Diego, CA	Torrey Pines	6 ft 4 in (1.93 m)	170 lb (77 kg)	Apr 3, 2018
Finn Sullivan; SG	Recruit ratings: Scout: Rivals: (0)				
Overall recruit ranking: Scout: nr Rivals: nr ESPN: nr
Note: In many cases, Scout, Rivals, 247Sports, On3, and ESPN may conflict in their listings of height and weight.; In these cases, the average was taken. ESPN grades are on a 100-point scale.; Sources: "San Diego Toreros 2018 Basketball Commitments". Rivals.; "2018 San Diego Toreros Basketball Commits". Scout.; "ESPN 2018 San Diego Toreros Basketball recruits". ESPN.; "Scout.com Team Recruiting Rankings". Scout.; "2018 Team Ranking". Rivals.

=== 2019 recruiting class ===
College recruiting information (2019)
Name	Hometown	School	Height	Weight	Commit date
Sabry Philip; SG	Edmonton, AB	TRC Academy	6 ft 4 in (1.93 m)	N/A	Apr 3, 2018
Sabry Philip; SG	Recruit ratings: Scout: Rivals: (0)				
Overall recruit ranking: Scout: nr Rivals: nr ESPN: nr
Note: In many cases, Scout, Rivals, 247Sports, On3, and ESPN may conflict in their listings of height and weight.; In these cases, the average was taken. ESPN grades are on a 100-point scale.; Sources: "San Diego Toreros 2019 Basketball Commitments". Rivals.; "2019 San Diego Toreros Basketball Commits". Scout.; "ESPN 2019 San Diego Toreros Basketball recruits". ESPN.; "Scout.com Team Recruiting Rankings". Scout.; "2019 Team Ranking". Rivals.

== Roster ==
2018–19 San Diego Toreros men's basketball team
Players
Coaches

Pos.	#	Name	Height	Weight	Year	Previous school	Hometown
F	0	Isaiah Pineiro	6 ft 7 in (2.01 m)	215 lb (98 kg)	RS Sr	Placer; Portland State	Auburn, CA
G	1	Tyler Williams	6 ft 5 in (1.96 m)	190 lb (86 kg)	Sr	Hebron	Plano, TX
G	2	Joey Calcaterra	6 ft 3 in (1.91 m)	165 lb (75 kg)	RS Fr	Marin Catholic	Novato, CA
G	3	Olin Carter III	6 ft 2 in (1.88 m)	190 lb (86 kg)	Sr	Allen	Allen, TX
G	4	Mitch Schafer (W)	5 ft 10 in (1.78 m)	170 lb (77 kg)	Sr	Jesuit	Portland, OR
G	5	Emanuel Hylton	6 ft 3 in (1.91 m)	200 lb (91 kg)	RS Fr	St. John's	Washington, D.C.
G	10	Andy Nelson (W)	6 ft 1 in (1.85 m)	180 lb (82 kg)	Jr	Holy Family	Lafayette, CO
C	11	Akim-Jamal Jonah	6 ft 11 in (2.11 m)	245 lb (111 kg)	RS Fr	Friedrich-Ebert-Gymnasium	Berlin, Germany
F	13	José Martinez	6 ft 10 in (2.08 m)	200 lb (91 kg)	Jr	Cheshire Academy	Cayey, PR
C	14	Andrew Ferguson	7 ft 0 in (2.13 m)	230 lb (104 kg)	RS Fr	Australian Centre of Excellence	Perth, Australia
F	15	Alex Floresca	6 ft 8 in (2.03 m)	240 lb (109 kg)	RS Jr	Webster Groves	Webster Groves, MO
G	20	Devin Moss (W)	6 ft 3 in (1.91 m)	190 lb (86 kg)	Sr	Rocklin	Roseville, CA
G	22	Isaiah Wright	6 ft 2 in (1.88 m)	180 lb (82 kg)	RS Sr	Borah; Utah	Boise, ID
G	23	Finn Sullivan	6 ft 4 in (1.93 m)	170 lb (77 kg)	Fr	Torrey Pines	San Diego, CA
F	25	Yauhen Massalski	6 ft 10 in (2.08 m)	227 lb (103 kg)	So	Gymnasium No. 15	Minsk, Belarus
C	32	Jake Gilliam (W)	6 ft 10 in (2.08 m)	255 lb (116 kg)	Fr	Torrey Pines	San Diego, CA

Head coach

- Sam Scholl (San Diego)

Assistant coach(es)

- David Carter (Saint Mary's)
- Chris Gerlufsen (Randolph–Macon)
- Terrence Rencher (Texas)

Legend

- (C) Team captain
- (S) Suspended
- (I) Ineligible
- (W) Walk-on
- Injured
- Current redshirt

Roster

== Schedule and results ==
Date time, TV	Rank^{#}	Opponent^{#}	Result	Record	High points	High rebounds	High assists	Site (attendance) city, state
Non-conference regular season
November 6, 2018*; 7:00 pm		Weber State	W 83–66	1–0	25 – Pineiro	12 – Pineiro	8 – Wright	Jenny Craig Pavilion (1,212); San Diego, CA
November 9, 2018*; 7:00 pm		at UC Davis	W 76–57	2–0	28 – Pineiro	8 – Pineiro	5 – Pineiro	The Pavilion (2,123); Davis, CA
November 12, 2018*; 8:00 pm, P12N		at Washington	L 63–66	2–1	17 – Carter III	11 – Massalski	9 – Williams	Alaska Airlines Arena (6,219); Seattle, WA
November 15, 2018*; 7:00 pm		San Diego Christian	W 95–47	3–1	21 – Carter III	9 – Martinez	6 – Williams	Jenny Craig Pavilion (544); San Diego, CA
November 20, 2018*; 7:00 pm, ESPNU		Colorado	W 70–64	4–1	27 – Pineiro	14 – Massalski	4 – Massalski	Jenny Craig Pavilion (1,808); San Diego, CA
November 24, 2018*; 7:00 pm		Jackson State	W 76–58	5–1	26 – Pineiro	9 – Pineiro	5 – Wright	Jenny Craig Pavilion (1,211); San Diego, CA
November 28, 2018*; 4:30 pm, SECN+		at Ole Miss	L 86–93	5–2	22 – Wright	5 – Floresca	6 – Wright	The Pavilion at Ole Miss (5,968); Oxford, MS
December 1, 2018*; 7:00 pm, FSSD		Long Beach State	W 74–70	6–2	21 – Carter III	9 – Pineiro	6 – Wright	Jenny Craig Pavilion (1,419); San Diego, CA
December 5, 2018*; 7:00 pm, Stadium		at San Diego State; City Championship	W 73–61	7–2	21 – Pineiro	7 – Sullivan	4 – Floresca	Viejas Arena (11,082); San Diego, CA
December 9, 2018*; 1:00 pm		Cal State Northridge; Las Vegas Classic	W 82–68	8–2	16 – Pineiro	7 – Pineiro	7 – Wright	Jenny Craig Pavilion (1,456); San Diego, CA
December 12, 2018*; 7:00 pm, P12N		at Oregon	L 55–65	8–3	14 – Pineiro	9 – Pineiro	5 – Wright	Matthew Knight Arena (7,191); Eugene, OR
December 15, 2018*; 7:00 pm		Northern Colorado; Las Vegas Classic	W 85–65	9–3	18 – Carter III	10 – Pineiro	5 – Williams	Jenny Craig Pavilion (1,497); San Diego, CA
December 22, 2018*; 4:30 pm, FS1		vs. Washington State; Las Vegas Classic semifinals	W 82–75	10–3	30 – Pineiro	9 – Floresca	6 – Floresca	Orleans Arena; Paradise, NV
December 23, 2018*; 4:30 pm, FS1		vs. Drake; Las Vegas Classic championship	L 103–110 ^{2OT}	10–4	30 – Carter III	8 – Pineiro	6 – Wright	Orleans Arena; Paradise, NV
December 29, 2018*; 7:00 pm		Grand Canyon	W 61–58	11–4	19 – Carter III	12 – Pineiro	4 – Williams	Jenny Craig Pavilion (2,603); San Diego, CA
WCC regular season
January 3, 2019; 7:00 pm		at Santa Clara	L 56–68	11–5 (0–1)	19 – Williams	16 – Pineiro	4 – Williams	Leavey Center (1,513); Santa Clara, CA
January 5, 2019; 8:00 pm, SPCSN		Pacific	W 73–64	12–5 (1–1)	24 – Pineiro	11 – Pineiro	4 – Pineiro	Jenny Craig Pavilion (1,491); San Diego, CA
January 12, 2019; 1:00 pm, SPCSN		Pepperdine	L 71–76	12–6 (1–2)	19 – Pineiro	7 – Massalski	6 – Calcaterra	Jenny Craig Pavilion (1,693); San Diego, CA
January 17, 2019; 7:00 pm		at Portland	W 76–55	13–6 (2–2)	15 – Martinez	12 – Pineiro	5 – Williams	Chiles Center (1,670); Portland, OR
January 19, 2019; 6:00 pm, NBCSBA		at Saint Mary's	L 59–76	13–7 (2–3)	19 – Pineiro	8 – Pineiro	2 – Wright	McKeon Pavilion (3,389); Moraga, CA
January 24, 2019; 7:00 pm, Stadium		Loyola Marymount	W 71–58	14–7 (3–3)	14 – Williams	6 – Williams	6 – Wright	Jenny Craig Pavilion (1,519); San Diego, CA
January 26, 2019; 7:00 pm, Stadium		San Francisco	W 67–63	15–7 (4–3)	22 – Pineiro	13 – Pineiro	3 – Williams	Jenny Craig Pavilion (2,803); San Diego, CA
February 2, 2019; 5:00 pm, RTNW/KHQ		at No. 4 Gonzaga	L 69–85	15–8 (4–4)	30 – Pineiro	11 – Pineiro	4 – Wright	McCarthey Athletic Center (6,000); Spokane, WA
February 7, 2019; 7:00 pm		at Loyola Marymount	W 65–63	16–8 (5–4)	15 – Carter III	10 – Massalski	7 – Wright	Gersten Pavilion (989); Los Angeles, CA
February 9, 2019; 1:00 pm, SPCSN		at Pepperdine	L 67–70	16–9 (5–5)	14 – Wright	10 – Pineiro	7 – Wright	Firestone Fieldhouse (1,015); Malibu, CA
February 14, 2019; 7:00 pm, SPCSN		BYU	L 82–88 ^{OT}	16–10 (5–6)	20 – Pineiro	12 – Pineiro	7 – Wright	Jenny Craig Pavilion (1,851); San Diego, CA
February 16, 2019; 7:00 pm, ESPN		No. 3 Gonzaga	L 67–79	16–11 (5–7)	20 – Pineiro	8 – Massalski	4 – Williams	Jenny Craig Pavilion (5,132); San Diego, CA
February 21, 2019; 7:00 pm		Portland	W 63–52	17–11 (6–7)	22 – Pineiro	16 – Pineiro	7 – Wright	Jenny Craig Pavilion (1,389); San Diego, CA
February 23, 2019; 6:00 pm, Stadium		Saint Mary's	L 46–66	17–12 (6–8)	13 – Pineiro	14 – Pineiro	3 – Wright	Jenny Craig Pavilion (3,189); San Diego, CA
February 28, 2019; 7:00 pm		at San Francisco	W 91–90 ^{OT}	18–12 (7–8)	28 – Pineiro	11 – Pineiro	4 – Wright	War Memorial Gymnasium (2,075); San Francisco, CA
March 2, 2019; 6:00 pm		at BYU	L 73–87	18–13 (7–9)	19 – Wright	10 – Pineiro	3 – Wright	Marriott Center (13,095); Provo, UT
WCC tournament
March 7, 2019; 8:40 pm	(7)	vs. (10) Portland; Opening round	W 67–47	19–13	16 – Pineiro	10 – Pineiro	6 – Wright	Orleans Arena (6,748); Paradise, NV
March 8, 2019; 8:20 pm	(7)	vs. (6) Santa Clara; Second round	W 62–45	20–13	23 – Wright	9 – Pineiro	8 – Wright	Orleans Arena (6,748); Paradise, NV
March 9, 2019; 8:59 pm, ESPN2	(7)	vs. (3) BYU; Third round	W 80–57	21–13	27 – Pineiro	12 – Pineiro	2 – Wright	Orleans Arena (6,882); Paradise, NV
March 11, 2019; 8:30 pm, ESPN2	(7)	vs. (2) Saint Mary's; Semifinals	L 62–69	21–14	22 – Wright	7 – Pineiro	2 – Floresca	Orleans Arena (7,642); Paradise, NV
NIT
March 19, 2019*; 6:00 pm, ESPN3	(6)	at (3) Memphis; First round – TCU bracket	L 60–74	21–15	17 – Carter III	11 – Massalski	6 – Williams	FedExForum (8,138); Memphis, TN
*Non-conference game. ^{#}Rankings from AP Poll. (#) Tournament seedings in parentheses. All times are in Pacific Time.

== See also ==
- 2018–19 San Diego Toreros women's basketball team
