= 2019 West Coast Conference men's basketball tournament =

- Classification: Division I
- Season: 2018–19
- Teams: 10
- Site: Orleans Arena; Paradise, Nevada
- Champions: Saint Mary's (4th title)
- Winning coach: Randy Bennett (3rd title)
- MVP: Jordan Hunter (Saint Mary's)
- Television: BYUtv, ESPN, ESPN2, ESPNU

2018–19 West Coast Conference men's basketball standings
	Conf.				Overall
Team	W		L	PCT	W		L	PCT
No. 4 Gonzaga	16	–	0	1.000	33	–	4	.892
Saint Mary's †	11	–	5	.688	22	–	12	.647
BYU	11	–	5	.688	19	–	13	.594
San Francisco	9	–	7	.563	21	–	10	.677
Loyola Marymount	8	–	8	.500	22	–	12	.647
Santa Clara	8	–	8	.500	16	–	15	.516
San Diego	7	–	9	.438	21	–	15	.583
Pepperdine	6	–	10	.375	16	–	18	.471
Pacific	4	–	12	.250	14	–	18	.438
Portland	0	–	16	.000	7	–	25	.219
† 2019 WCC tournament winner Rankings from AP Poll

The 2019 West Coast Conference men's basketball tournament was the postseason men's basketball tournament for the West Coast Conference during the 2018–19 NCAA Division I men's basketball season, held March 7–12 at the Orleans Arena in Paradise, Nevada. Saint Mary's upset top-ranked Gonzaga 60–47 in the championship game and received the conference's automatic bid to the 68-team NCAA tournament.

It was the fourth WCC tournament title for Saint Mary's, their first since 2012, and the Gaels were seeded eleventh in the South regional of the NCAA Tournament. With the loss, Gonzaga fell to fourth in the national rankings, but was still the top seed in the West regional.

== Seeds ==
All ten WCC schools teams participated in the tournament, seeded by conference record, with a tiebreaker system for identical conference records. The tournament returned to a format similar to that used from 2003 to 2011, with slight changes to the terminology used for the rounds prior to the semifinals. The 7 through 10 seeds will play in the "first round", the 5 and 6 seeds will start play in the "second round", and the 3 and 4 seeds will start in the "third round". The top two seeds will receive byes into the semifinals.

As the regular-season champion, Gonzaga clinched a semifinal spot, and technically secured a place in the NIT. However, the Bulldogs were all but certain to receive an NCAA Tournament bid regardless of results in the conference tournament, given that they entered the final week of the conference season as the top-ranked team in the AP poll.

Saint Mary's also clinched a semifinal berth as the regular season runner-up. BYU and San Francisco clinched double byes, while LMU and Santa Clara had single byes. San Diego, Pepperdine, Pacific and Portland played in the first round.

Seed	School	Record	Tiebreaker 1	Tiebreaker 2
1	Gonzaga	16–0		
2	Saint Mary's	11–5	1–1 vs. BYU	0–2 vs. Gonzaga, 1–1 vs. USF
3	BYU	11–5	1–1 vs. SMC	0–2 vs. Gonzaga, 0–2 vs. USF
4	San Francisco	9–7		
5	Loyola Marymount	8–8	2–0 vs. SCU	
6	Santa Clara	8–8	0–2 vs. LMU	
7	San Diego	7–9		
8	Pepperdine	6–10		
9	Pacific	4–12		
10	Portland	0–16		

== Schedule ==
Session	Game	Time*	Matchup^{#}	Score	Television	Attendance
First round – Thursday March 7, 2019
1	1	6:00 pm	8 Pepperdine vs. 9 Pacific	61–53	TheW.tv	
1	2	8:00 pm	7 San Diego vs. 10 Portland	67–47	TheW.tv	
Second round – Friday March 8, 2019
2	3	6:00 pm	5 Loyola Marymount vs. 8 Pepperdine	65–68	TheW.tv	
2	4	8:00 pm	6 Santa Clara vs. 7 San Diego	45–62	TheW.tv	
Third round – Saturday, March 9, 2019
3	5	7:00 pm	4 San Francisco vs 8 Pepperdine	72–89	ESPN2	
3	6	9:00 pm	3 BYU vs 7 San Diego	57–80	ESPN2	
Semifinals – Monday, March 11, 2019
4	7	6:00 pm	1 Gonzaga vs 8 Pepperdine	100–74	ESPN	
4	8	8:30 pm	2 Saint Mary's vs 7 San Diego	69–62	ESPN2	
Championship – Tuesday, March 12, 2019
5	9	6:00 pm	1 Gonzaga vs. 2 Saint Mary's	47–60	ESPN	
*Game times in PT. #-Rankings denote tournament seeding.

== Bracket ==
First round Thursday, March 7
8	Pepperdine	61
9	Pacific	53
7	San Diego	67
10	Portland	47

Second round Friday, March 8
5	Loyola Marymount	65
8	Pepperdine	68
6	Santa Clara	45
7	San Diego	62

Third round Saturday, March 9
4	San Francisco	72
8	Pepperdine	89
3	BYU	57
7	San Diego	80

Semifinals; Monday, March 11
1	Gonzaga	100
8	Pepperdine	74
2	Saint Mary's	69
7	San Diego	62

Championship; Tuesday, March 12
1	Gonzaga	47
2	Saint Mary's	60
