= 2018–19 San Francisco Dons men's basketball team =

American college basketball season

2018–19 San Francisco Dons men's basketball
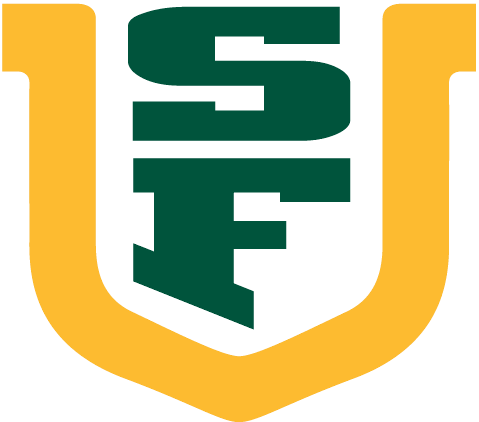
- Conference: West Coast Conference
- Record: 21–10 (9–7 WCC)
- Head coach: Kyle Smith (3rd season)
- Associate head coach: Derrick Phelps; Todd Golden
- Assistant coach: Kevin Hovde
- Home arena: War Memorial Gymnasium

2018–19 West Coast Conference men's basketball standings
	Conf.				Overall
Team	W		L	PCT	W		L	PCT
No. 4 Gonzaga	16	–	0	1.000	33	–	4	.892
Saint Mary's †	11	–	5	.688	22	–	12	.647
BYU	11	–	5	.688	19	–	13	.594
San Francisco	9	–	7	.563	21	–	10	.677
Loyola Marymount	8	–	8	.500	22	–	12	.647
Santa Clara	8	–	8	.500	16	–	15	.516
San Diego	7	–	9	.438	21	–	15	.583
Pepperdine	6	–	10	.375	16	–	18	.471
Pacific	4	–	12	.250	14	–	18	.438
Portland	0	–	16	.000	7	–	25	.219
† 2019 WCC tournament winner Rankings from AP Poll

The 2018–19 San Francisco Dons men's basketball team represented the University of San Francisco during the 2018–19 NCAA Division I men's basketball season. The Dons, led by third-year head coach Kyle Smith, played their home games at the War Memorial Gymnasium as members of the West Coast Conference.

== Previous season ==
The Dons finished the 2017–18 season 22–17, 9–9 in WCC play to finish in a three-way tie for fourth place. They defeated Pacific in the quarterfinals of the WCC tournament before losing in the semifinals to Gonzaga. They were invited to the College Basketball Invitational where they defeated Colgate, Utah Valley, and Campbell to advance to the best-of-three championship series against North Texas where they won game 1 before losing game 2 and 3.

== Offseason ==
=== Departures ===
Name	Number	Pos.	Height	Weight	Year	Hometown	Reason for departure
Souley Boum	0	G	6'3"	145	Freshman	Oakland, CA	Transferred to UTEP
Chase Foster	22	F	6'5"	187	Senior	Highlands Ranch, CO	Graduated
Mars Pasache	30	G	6'1"	175	Senior	San Francisco, CA	Walk-on; graduated
Erik Poulsen	31	C	6'11"	235	Sophomore	Santa Rosa, CA	Graduate transferred to Western Oregon
Nick Loew	44	F	6'8"	220	Junior	Burlingame, CA	Walk-on; left the team for personal reasons

=== Incoming transfers ===
Name	Number	Pos.	Height	Weight	Year	Hometown	Previous School
Khalil Shabazz	0	G	6'1"	170	Sophomore	Seattle, WA	Transferred from Central Washington. Under NCAA transfer rules, Shabazz will have to sit out for the 2018–19 season. Will have three years of remaining eligibility.
Nathan Krill	31	F	6'7"	210	RS Senior	St. Helena, CA	Transferred from Wesleyan. Will be eligible to play immediately since Krill graduated from Wesleyan.

=== 2018 recruiting class ===
College recruiting information
Name	Hometown	School	Height	Weight	Commit date
Trevante Anderson; PG	Tacoma, WA	Lincoln High School	6 ft 1 in (1.85 m)	175 lb (79 kg)	
Trevante Anderson; PG	Recruit ratings: Scout: Rivals: (NR)				
Dylan Belquist; F	Los Gatos, CA	Los Gatos High School	6 ft 6 in (1.98 m)	190 lb (86 kg)	
Dylan Belquist; F	Recruit ratings: Scout: Rivals: (NR)				
Dmitry Ryuny; PF	Minsk, Belarus	Central Park Christian School	6 ft 9 in (2.06 m)	190 lb (86 kg)	
Dmitry Ryuny; PF	Recruit ratings: Scout: Rivals: (NR)				
Overall recruit ranking: Scout: nr Rivals: nr ESPN: nr
Note: In many cases, Scout, Rivals, 247Sports, On3, and ESPN may conflict in their listings of height and weight.; In these cases, the average was taken. ESPN grades are on a 100-point scale.; Sources: "San Francisco Dons 2018 Basketball Commitments". Rivals.; "2018 San Francisco Dons Basketball Commits". Scout.; "ESPN". ESPN.; "Scout.com Team Recruiting Rankings". Scout.; "2018 Team Ranking". Rivals.

== Roster ==
2018–19 San Francisco Dons men's basketball team
Players
Coaches

Pos.	#	Name	Height	Weight	Year	Previous school	Hometown
G	0	Khalil Shabazz (redshirt)	6 ft 1 in (1.85 m)	170 lb (77 kg)	So	Rainier Beach; Central Washington	Seattle, WA
G	1	Jamaree Bouyea	6 ft 2 in (1.88 m)	155 lb (70 kg)	So	Palma	Seaside, CA
G	2	Frankie Ferrari	5 ft 11 in (1.8 m)	179 lb (81 kg)	Sr	Burlingame	Burlingame, CA
G	3	Michael Orlich (W)	5 ft 11 in (1.8 m)	180 lb (82 kg)	Jr	Clovis West; De Anza College	Fresno, CA
C	5	Jimbo Lull	7 ft 0 in (2.13 m)	252 lb (114 kg)	Jr	New Hampton School	Manhattan Beach, CA
F	10	Matt McCarthy	6 ft 9 in (2.06 m)	232 lb (105 kg)	Sr	Xavier College	Melbourne, Australia
F	11	Remu Raitanen	6 ft 9 in (2.06 m)	198 lb (90 kg)	Jr	Helsinki Basketball Academy	Helsinki, Finland
G	12	Trevante Anderson	6 ft 1 in (1.85 m)	170 lb (77 kg)	Fr	Lincoln	Tacoma, WA
G	14	Charles Minlend	6 ft 4 in (1.93 m)	208 lb (94 kg)	RS So	Fork Union Military Academy	Concord, NC
F	15	Nate Renfro	6 ft 8 in (2.03 m)	202 lb (92 kg)	Sr	Sahuaro	Tucson, AZ
F	21	Dylan Belquist	6 ft 6 in (1.98 m)	190 lb (86 kg)	Fr	Los Gatos	Los Gatos, CA
F	22	Dzmitry Ryuny	6 ft 9 in (2.06 m)	200 lb (91 kg)	Fr	Central Park Christian Schools	Minsk, Belarus
G	25	Jordan Ratinho	6 ft 5 in (1.96 m)	210 lb (95 kg)	Jr	De La Salle	Livermore, CA
F	31	Nathan Krill	6 ft 7 in (2.01 m)	210 lb (95 kg)	RS Sr	Justin-Siena; Wesleyan	St. Helena, CA
F	34	Taavi Jurkatamm	6 ft 9 in (2.06 m)	210 lb (95 kg)	So	Audentes Sports Gymnasium	Tallinn, Estonia
G	45	Mladen Djordjevic	6 ft 3 in (1.91 m)	184 lb (83 kg)	Sr	Tamiš Club	Belgrade, Serbia

Head coach

- Kyle Smith (Hamilton)

Assistant coach(es)

- Derrick Phelps (North Carolina)
- Todd Golden (Saint Mary's)
- Kevin Hovde (Richmond)

Legend

- (C) Team captain
- (S) Suspended
- (I) Ineligible
- (W) Walk-on
- Injured
- Current redshirt

Roster

== Schedule and results ==
Date time, TV	Rank^{#}	Opponent^{#}	Result	Record	Site (attendance) city, state
Non-conference regular season
November 6, 2018*; 7:00 pm		at UC Davis	W 76–42	1–0	The Pavilion (1,891); Davis, CA
November 10, 2018*; 2:00 pm		Maine	W 93–50	2–0	War Memorial Gymnasium (1,813); San Francisco, CA
November 12, 2018*; 7:00 pm		Sonoma State	W 88–54	3–0	War Memorial Gymnasium (1,132); San Francisco, CA
November 16, 2018*; 5:00 pm, P12N		Arizona State; Postponed (poor air quality), makeup TBD			War Memorial Gymnasium; San Francisco, CA
November 18, 2018*; 7:00 pm		vs. LIU Brooklyn; Basketball Hall of Fame Belfast Classic campus game	W 84–52	4–0	The Kelp Bed (289); Seaside, CA
November 21, 2018*; 7:00 pm		Harvard	W 61–57	5–0	War Memorial Gymnasium (1,719); San Francisco, CA
November 24, 2018*; 2:00 pm		Dartmouth; Basketball Hall of Fame Belfast Classic campus game	W 84–65	6–0	War Memorial Gymnasium (2,017); San Francisco, CA
November 30, 2018*; 5:00 am		vs. Stephen F. Austin; Basketball Hall of Fame Belfast Classic Goliath semifinals	W 76–58	7–0	SSE Arena; Belfast, Northern Ireland
December 1, 2018*; 7:30 am, CBSSN		vs. No. 21 Buffalo; Basketball Hall of Fame Belfast Classic Goliath championship	L 81–85	7–1	SSE Arena; Belfast, Northern Ireland
December 5, 2018*; 8:00 pm, P12N		at California	W 79–60	8–1	Haas Pavilion (4,039); Berkeley, CA
December 13, 2018*; 7:00 pm		Eastern Washington	W 85–63	9–1	War Memorial Gymnasium (1,439); San Francisco, CA
December 16, 2018*; 1:00 pm		Cal State Fullerton	W 68–54	10–1	War Memorial Gymnasium (1,581); San Francisco, CA
December 19, 2018*; 7:00 pm		Northern Arizona	W 76–60	11–1	War Memorial Gymnasium (1,297); San Francisco, CA
December 22, 2018*; 2:00 pm, P12N		Stanford	W 74–65	12–1	War Memorial Gymnasium (3,005); San Francisco, CA
December 29, 2018*; 7:00 pm		at UC Santa Barbara	L 71–73	12–2	The Thunderdome (1,712); Santa Barbara, CA
WCC regular season
January 3, 2019; 8:00 pm, ESPN2		Saint Mary's	W 76–72	13–2 (1–0)	War Memorial Gymnasium (3,005); San Francisco, CA
January 5, 2019; 5:00 pm		at Pepperdine	W 72–69	14–2 (2–0)	Firestone Fieldhouse (1,518); Malibu, CA
January 12, 2019; 7:00 pm, ESPN2		No. 5 Gonzaga	L 83–96	14–3 (2–1)	War Memorial Gymnasium (3,008); San Francisco, CA
January 17, 2019; 6:00 pm, NBCSBA		at Pacific	W 53–52	15–3 (3–1)	Alex G. Spanos Center (1,777); Stockton, CA
January 19, 2019; 8:00 pm, NBCSBA		BYU	W 82–63	16–3 (4–1)	War Memorial Gymnasium (3,005); San Francisco, CA
January 24, 2019; 7:00 pm		Portland	W 83–61	17–3 (5–1)	War Memorial Gymnasium (2,468); San Francisco, CA
January 26, 2019; 7:00 pm, Stadium		at San Diego	L 63–67	17–4 (5–2)	Jenny Craig Pavilion (2,803); San Diego, CA
February 2, 2019; 1:00 pm, SPCSN		at Saint Mary's	L 80–86	17–5 (5–3)	McKeon Pavilion (3,500); Moraga, CA
February 7, 2019; 6:00 pm, RTNW		at No. 4 Gonzaga	L 62–92	17–6 (5–4)	McCarthey Athletic Center (6,000); Spokane, WA
February 9, 2019; 8:00 pm, NBCBA		Santa Clara	W 78–72	18–6 (6–4)	War Memorial Gymnasium (3,005); San Francisco, CA
February 14, 2019; 7:00 pm, THEW.TV		Pepperdine	W 89–77	19–6 (7–4)	War Memorial Gymnasium (1,836); San Francisco, CA
February 16, 2019; 7:00 pm, RTNW		at Portland	W 68–63 ^{OT}	20–6 (8–4)	Chiles Center (3,243); Portland, OR
February 21, 2019; 6:00 pm		at BYU	W 77–71	21–6 (9–4)	Marriott Center (11,484); Provo, UT
February 23, 2019; 8:00 pm, NBCSBA		at Santa Clara	W 68–65	21–7 (9–5)	Leavey Center (3,125); Santa Clara, CA
February 28, 2019; 7:00 pm		San Diego	L 90–91 ^{OT}	21–8 (9–6)	War Memorial Gymnasium (2,075); San Francisco, CA
March 2, 2019; 1:00 pm, SPCSN		Loyola Marymount	L 69–74	21–9 (9–7)	War Memorial Gymnasium (3,005); San Francisco, CA
WCC tournament
March 9, 2019; 7:00 pm, ESPN2	(4)	vs. (8) Pepperdine; Third round	L 72–89	21–10	Orleans Arena; Paradise, NV
*Non-conference game. ^{#}Rankings from AP Poll. (#) Tournament seedings in parentheses. All times are in Pacific Time.
