= 2018–19 Portland Pilots men's basketball team =

American college basketball season

2018–19 Portland Pilots men's basketball
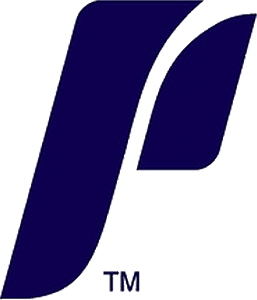
- Conference: West Coast Conference
- Record: 7–25 (0–16 WCC)
- Head coach: Terry Porter (3rd season)
- Assistant coaches: Ben Johnson; Tyler Geving
- Home arena: Chiles Center

2018–19 West Coast Conference men's basketball standings
	Conf.				Overall
Team	W		L	PCT	W		L	PCT
No. 4 Gonzaga	16	–	0	1.000	33	–	4	.892
Saint Mary's †	11	–	5	.688	22	–	12	.647
BYU	11	–	5	.688	19	–	13	.594
San Francisco	9	–	7	.563	21	–	10	.677
Loyola Marymount	8	–	8	.500	22	–	12	.647
Santa Clara	8	–	8	.500	16	–	15	.516
San Diego	7	–	9	.438	21	–	15	.583
Pepperdine	6	–	10	.375	16	–	18	.471
Pacific	4	–	12	.250	14	–	18	.438
Portland	0	–	16	.000	7	–	25	.219
† 2019 WCC tournament winner Rankings from AP Poll

The 2018–19 Portland Pilots men's basketball team represented the University of Portland during the 2018–19 NCAA Division I men's basketball season. The Pilots, led by third-year head coach Terry Porter, played their home games at the Chiles Center as members of the West Coast Conference. They finished the season 7–25, 0-16 in WCC play to finish in last place. They lost in the first round of the WCC tournament to San Diego.

== Previous season ==
The Pilots finished the 2017–18 season 10–22, 4–14 in WCC play to finish in ninth place. They lost in the first round of the WCC tournament to Loyola Marymount.

== Offseason ==
=== Departures ===
Name	Number	Pos.	Height	Weight	Year	Hometown	Reason for departure
D'Marques Tyson	5	G	6'5"	215	Senior	Bothell, WA	Graduated
Philipp Hartwich	15	C	7'2"	250	Senior	Cologne, Germany	Graduated
Austin Stone	34	F/C	6'8"	225	Junior	Lake Wylie, SC	Transferred to Mars Hill
Joseph Smoyer	41	F/C	6'10"	230	Sophomore	Portland, OR	Transferred to Columbia

=== Incoming transfers ===
Name	Number	Pos.	Height	Weight	Year	Hometown	Previous School
Tymoryae Glover	3	G	6'7"	170	Junior	Pasadena, CA	Junior college transferred from San Bernardino Valley College
Jacob Tryon	33	F	7'0"	205	Sophomore	Temecula, CA	Junior college transferred from East Los Angeles College

=== Recruiting class of 2018 ===
College recruiting information
Name	Hometown	School	Height	Weight	Commit date
Josh Phillips; PF	Huntington Beach, CA	Edison High School	6 ft 8 in (2.03 m)	185 lb (84 kg)	Jul 23, 2017
Josh Phillips; PF	Recruit ratings: Scout: Rivals: (NR)				
Theo Akwuba; C	Montgomery, AL	Brewbaker Technology Magnet High School	6 ft 8 in (2.03 m)	205 lb (93 kg)	Apr 19, 2018
Theo Akwuba; C	Recruit ratings: Scout: Rivals: (NR)				
Overall recruit ranking: Scout: nr Rivals: nr ESPN: nr
Note: In many cases, Scout, Rivals, 247Sports, On3, and ESPN may conflict in their listings of height and weight.; In these cases, the average was taken. ESPN grades are on a 100-point scale.; Sources: "Portland Pilots 2018 Basketball Commitments". Rivals.; "2018 Portland Pilots Basketball Commits". Scout.; "ESPN 2018 Portland Pilots Basketball recruits". ESPN.; "Scout.com Team Recruiting Rankings". Scout.; "2018 Team Ranking". Rivals.

== Roster ==
2018–19 Portland Pilots men's basketball team
Players
Coaches

Pos.	#	Name	Height	Weight	Year	Previous school	Hometown
G	0	Crisshawn Clark	6 ft 4 in (1.93 m)	205 lb (93 kg)	RS Jr	Cañada College/Pittsburgh; Wayne	Dayton, OH
G	1	Malcolm Porter	6 ft 4 in (1.93 m)	200 lb (91 kg)	RS So	Jesuit	Portland, OR
G	2	JoJo Walker	6 ft 1 in (1.85 m)	170 lb (77 kg)	So	St. Joseph	Carolina, PR
F	3	Ty Glover	6 ft 7 in (2.01 m)	185 lb (84 kg)	Jr	San Bernardino Valley College; San Bernardino	San Bernardino, CA
G	5	Miles Turner (W)	6 ft 1 in (1.85 m)	190 lb (86 kg)	Fr	Tracy	Tracy, CA
G	10	Marcus Shaver Jr.	6 ft 2 in (1.88 m)	185 lb (84 kg)	So	Shadow Mountain	Phoenix, AZ
G/F	11	Josh McSwiggan	6 ft 7 in (2.01 m)	220 lb (100 kg)	RS Jr	UTEP/Casper College; Charnwood College	Loughborough, England
C	12	Theo Akwuba	6 ft 10 in (2.08 m)	205 lb (93 kg)	Fr	Brewbaker Technology Magnet	Montgomery, AL
G	13	Franklin Porter (W)	6 ft 4 in (1.93 m)	215 lb (98 kg)	RS Jr	Saint Mary's; Tilton School	Portland, OR
F	14	Tahirou Diabate	6 ft 9 in (2.06 m)	240 lb (109 kg)	So	Teikyo Nagaoka	Bamako, Mali
G	20	Takiula Faheresohn	6 ft 6 in (1.98 m)	190 lb (86 kg)	RS Fr	Auckland Grammar	Auckland, New Zealand
F	21	Josh Phillips	6 ft 9 in (2.06 m)	225 lb (102 kg)	Fr	Edison	Huntington Beach, CA
G	22	Brian Smith (W)	6 ft 0 in (1.83 m)	180 lb (82 kg)	So	Boise/SOE Prep	Boise, ID
F/C	32	Hugh Hogland	6 ft 10 in (2.08 m)	240 lb (109 kg)	RS Fr	ʻIolani School	Waimānalo, HI
F/C	33	Jacob Tryon	7 ft 0 in (2.13 m)	205 lb (93 kg)	So	East Los Angeles College; Great Oak	Temecula, CA
F	34	Wyatt Watson (W)	6 ft 8 in (2.03 m)	185 lb (84 kg)	Fr	Sehome	Bellingham, WA
G	55	Xavier Hallinan (W)	6 ft 1 in (1.85 m)	170 lb (77 kg)	RS Jr	Central Catholic	Portland, OR

Head coach

- Terry Porter (UW–Stevens Point)

Assistant coach(es)

- Ben Johnson (Green Bay)
- Tyler Geving (Central Washington)

Legend

- (C) Team captain
- (S) Suspended
- (I) Ineligible
- (W) Walk-on
- Injured
- Current redshirt

Roster

== Schedule and results ==
Date time, TV	Rank^{#}	Opponent^{#}	Result	Record	High points	High rebounds	High assists	Site (attendance) city, state
Exhibition
October 27, 2018*; 7:00 pm		Antelope Valley	W 94–64		–	–	–	Chiles Center (1,394); Portland, OR
November 3, 2018*; 7:00 pm		Westmont	W 94–80		–	–	–	Chiles Center (1,481); Portland, OR
Non-conference regular season
November 6, 2018*; 7:00 pm		Multnomah	W 111–103	1–0	37 – McSwiggan	11 – McSwiggan	9 – Shaver Jr.	Chiles Center (1,263); Portland, OR
November 9, 2018*; 9:00 pm		at Hawaii; Rainbow Classic	L 64–82	1–1	19 – Shaver Jr.	6 – Walker	4 – Walker	Stan Sheriff Center (5,481); Honolulu, HI
November 10, 2018*; 6:30 pm		vs. North Texas; Rainbow Classic	L 73–78	1–2	22 – Walker	8 – Akwuba	2 – Tied	Stan Sheriff Center (5,111); Honolulu, HI
November 17, 2018*; 7:00 pm		at Cal State Northridge	W 80–77	2–2	23 – Walker	7 – Akwuba	7 – Walker	Matadome (886); Northridge, CA
November 19, 2018*; 7:00 pm		Lewis & Clark	W 77–57	3–2	16 – Shaver Jr.	13 – Akwuba	4 – McSwiggan	Chiles Center (1,286); Portland, OR
November 21, 2018*; 7:00 pm		USC Upstate; Portland Classic	W 73–56	4–2	17 – McSwiggan	11 – Akwuba	4 – Walker	Chiles Center (1,249); Portland, OR
November 23, 2018*; 7:00 pm		Cal Poly; Portland Classic	W 72–67	5–2	24 – Porter	8 – Akwuba	6 – Shaver Jr.	Chiles Center (1,320); Portland, OR
November 24, 2018*; 5:00 pm		Texas State; Portland Classic	L 68–91	5–3	17 – Walker	6 – McSwiggan	5 – Shaver Jr.	Chiles Center (1,303); Portland, OR
November 28, 2018*; 6:00 pm, P12N		at Colorado	L 69–93	5–4	22 – McSwiggan	6 – Akwuba	3 – Walker	CU Events Center (5,550); Boulder, CO
December 5, 2018*; 7:05 pm		at Portland State	L 78–87	5–5	17 – Walker	5 – Akwuba	7 – Walker	Viking Pavilion (2,020); Portland, OR
December 8, 2018*; 7:00 pm		Sacramento State	W 76–67	6–5	22 – Walker	8 – Akwuba	4 – Walker	Chiles Center (1,789); Portland, OR
December 15, 2018*; 7:00 pm		Grambling State	L 58–70	6–6	14 – Shaver Jr.	6 – Walker	4 – Walker	Chiles Center (1,410); Portland, OR
December 17, 2018*; 7:00 pm		Seattle	L 56–67	6–7	14 – McSwiggan	6 – Hogland	3 – Porter	Chiles Center (1,553); Portland, OR
December 21, 2018*; 5:00 pm		Florida A&M	W 54–39	7–7	16 – McSwiggan	11 – Porter	2 – Tied	Chiles Center (1,417); Portland, OR
December 29, 2018*; 6:00 pm		at Cal State Fullerton	L 64–79	7–8	17 – Shaver Jr.	5 – Porter	3 – Shaver Jr.	Titan Gym (783); Fullerton, CA
WCC regular season
January 5, 2019; 3:00 pm		at Loyola Marymount	L 64–76	7–9 (0–1)	20 – Walker	5 – Walker	5 – Walker	Gersten Pavilion (815); Los Angeles, CA
January 10, 2019; 6:00 pm, BYUtv		at BYU	L 56–79	7–10 (0–2)	14 – Porter	7 – Akwuba	3 – Walker	Marriott Center (10,733); Provo, UT
January 12, 2019; 7:00 pm, RTNW		Pacific	L 57–65	7–11 (0–3)	25 – Shaver Jr.	5 – Clark	3 – Shaver Jr.	Chiles Center (2,016); Portland, OR
January 17, 2019; 7:00 pm		San Diego	L 55–76	7–12 (0–4)	21 – Shaver Jr.	4 – Shaver Jr.	4 – Shaver Jr.	Chiles Center (1,670); Portland, OR
January 19, 2019; 7:00 pm, RTNW		No. 5 Gonzaga	L 66–89	7–13 (0–5)	18 – Shaver Jr.	6 – Hogland	7 – Walker	Chiles Center (4,852); Portland, OR
January 24, 2019; 7:00 pm		at San Francisco	L 61–83	7–14 (0–6)	13 – Shaver Jr.	9 – Tryon	4 – Walker	War Memorial Gymnasium (2,468); San Francisco, CA
January 26, 2019; 1:00 pm, RTNW		at Pacific	L 70–74	7–15 (0–7)	30 – Shaver Jr.	5 – Shaver Jr.	2 – Tied	Alex G. Spanos Center (2,127); Stockton, CA
January 31, 2019; 7:00 pm, RTNW		Pepperdine	L 58–83	7–16 (0–8)	9 – Walker	5 – Porter	5 – Porter	Chiles Center (1,751); Portland, OR
February 2, 2019; 6:00 pm		at Santa Clara	L 63–69 ^{OT}	7–17 (0–9)	15 – Shaver Jr.	8 – McSwiggan	5 – Walker	Leavey Center (2,226); Santa Clara, CA
February 7, 2019; 8:00 pm, ESPN2		BYU	L 48–83	7–18 (0–10)	9 – Shaver Jr.	4 – Shaver Jr.	3 – Walker	Chiles Center (2,581); Portland, OR
February 9, 2019; 7:00 pm		Loyola Marymount	L 55–72	7–19 (0–11)	19 – Shaver Jr.	4 – Shaver Jr.	4 – Porter	Chiles Center (1,927); Portland, OR
February 16, 2019; 7:00 pm, RTNW		San Francisco	L 63–68 ^{OT2}	7–20 (0–12)	15 – Shaver Jr.	8 – Shaver Jr.	5 – Walker	Chiles Center (3,243); Portland, OR
February 21, 2019; 7:00 pm		at San Diego	L 52–63	7–21 (0–13)	12 – Diabate	6 – Diabate	5 – Walker	Jenny Craig Pavilion (1,389); San Diego, CA
February 23, 2019; 5:00 pm		at Pepperdine	L 80–86	7–22 (0–14)	20 – McSwiggan	5 – McSwiggan	3 – Tied	Firestone Fieldhouse (1,045); Malibu, CA
February 26, 2019; 8:00 pm, RTNW		at Saint Mary's	L 48–65	7–23 (0–15)	13 – Shaver Jr.	9 – Hogland	1 – Tied	McKeon Pavilion (3,254); Moraga, CA
March 2, 2019; 7:00 pm		Santa Clara	L 62–68	7–24 (0–16)	16 – Shaver Jr.	5 – McSwiggan	5 – Porter	Chiles Center (3,007); Portland, OR
WCC tournament
March 7, 2019; 10:00 pm	(10)	vs. (7) San Diego; Opening round	L 47–67	7–25	13 – Walker	6 – Porter	1 – Tied	Orleans Arena (6,748); Paradise, NV
*Non-conference game. ^{#}Rankings from AP Poll. (#) Tournament seedings in parentheses. All times are in Pacific Time.

Source: Schedule
