= 2018–19 Pacific Tigers men's basketball team =

American college basketball season

2018–19 Pacific Tigers men's basketball
- Conference: West Coast Conference
- Record: 14–18 (4–12 WCC)
- Head coach: Damon Stoudamire (3rd season)
- Assistant coaches: Leonard Perry; Luke Wicks; JayDee Luster
- Home arena: Alex G. Spanos Center

2018–19 West Coast Conference men's basketball standings
	Conf.				Overall
Team	W		L	PCT	W		L	PCT
No. 4 Gonzaga	16	–	0	1.000	33	–	4	.892
Saint Mary's †	11	–	5	.688	22	–	12	.647
BYU	11	–	5	.688	19	–	13	.594
San Francisco	9	–	7	.563	21	–	10	.677
Loyola Marymount	8	–	8	.500	22	–	12	.647
Santa Clara	8	–	8	.500	16	–	15	.516
San Diego	7	–	9	.438	21	–	15	.583
Pepperdine	6	–	10	.375	16	–	18	.471
Pacific	4	–	12	.250	14	–	18	.438
Portland	0	–	16	.000	7	–	25	.219
† 2019 WCC tournament winner Rankings from AP Poll

The 2018–19 Pacific Tigers men's basketball team represented the University of the Pacific during the 2018–19 NCAA Division I men's basketball season. The Tigers were led by third-year head coach Damon Stoudamire and played their home games at the Alex G. Spanos Center in Stockton, California as members of the West Coast Conference. They finished the season 14–18, 4–12 in WCC play to finish in ninth place. They lost in the first round of the WCC tournament to Pepperdine.

== Previous season ==
The Tigers finished the 2017–18 season 14–18, 9–9 in WCC play to finish in a three-way tie for fourth place. They lost in the first round of the WCC tournament to San Francisco.

== Offseason ==
=== Departures ===
Name	Number	Pos.	Height	Weight	Year	Hometown	Reason for departure
Miles Reynolds	3	G	6'2"	170	RS Junior	Chicago, IL	Graduate transferred to Oklahoma
Max Tinsley	14	G	6'2"	170	Junior	Porter Ranch, CA	Walk-on; transferred
Otto Taylor	20	G	6'2"	170	Freshman	San Diego, CA	Walk-on; transferred
Namdi Okonkwo	24	C	7'0"	220	RS Senior	Dallas, TX	Graduated
Jack Williams	32	F	6'8"	220	RS Junior	Porter Ranch, CA	Graduate transferred to Rice

=== Incoming transfers ===
Name	Number	Pos.	Height	Weight	Year	Hometown	Previous School
Amari McCray	2	F	6'9"		Junior	Ruston, LA	Junior college transferred from Howard College
Jeremiah Bailey	13	F	6'6"	210	Sophomore	Anchorage, AK	Junior college transferred from Pima CC
Zach Cameron	35	C	6'10"	215	Junior	Sacramento, CA	Junior college transferred from Mineral Area College

=== Recruiting Class of 2018 ===
College recruiting information
Name	Hometown	School	Height	Weight	Commit date
Ajare Sanni; PG	Clear Lake, TX	Clear Lake High School	6 ft 2 in (1.88 m)	170 lb (77 kg)	Sep 25, 2017
Ajare Sanni; PG	Recruit ratings: Scout: Rivals: (NR)				
Jahbril Price-Noel; SF	Scarborough, ON	Southwest Christian Academy	6 ft 7 in (2.01 m)	N/A	
Jahbril Price-Noel; SF	Recruit ratings: Scout: Rivals: (NR)				
Overall recruit ranking: Scout: 98 Rivals: nr ESPN: nr
Note: In many cases, Scout, Rivals, 247Sports, On3, and ESPN may conflict in their listings of height and weight.; In these cases, the average was taken. ESPN grades are on a 100-point scale.; Sources: "Pacific 2018 Basketball Commitments". Rivals.; "2018 Pacific Basketball Commits". Scout.; "ESPN". ESPN.; "Scout.com Team Recruiting Rankings". Scout.; "2018 Team Ranking". Rivals.

=== Recruiting Class of 2019 ===
College recruiting information (2018)
Name	Hometown	School	Height	Weight	Commit date
Jonathan Salazar #37 PF	Bellflower, CA	St. John Bosco High School	6 ft 6 in (1.98 m)	235 lb (107 kg)	Aug 14, 2018
Jonathan Salazar #37 PF	Recruit ratings: Scout: Rivals: (78)				
Overall recruit ranking: Scout: 98 Rivals: nr ESPN: nr
Note: In many cases, Scout, Rivals, 247Sports, On3, and ESPN may conflict in their listings of height and weight.; In these cases, the average was taken. ESPN grades are on a 100-point scale.; Sources: "Pacific 2019 Basketball Commitments". Rivals.; "2019 Pacific Basketball Commits". Scout.; "ESPN". ESPN.; "Scout.com Team Recruiting Rankings". Scout.; "2019 Team Ranking". Rivals.

== Roster ==
2018–19 Pacific Tigers men's basketball team
Players
Coaches

Pos.	#	Name	Height	Weight	Year	Previous school	Hometown
F	0	Jahlil Tripp	6 ft 5 in (1.96 m)	190 lb (86 kg)	Jr	Abraham Lincoln; South Plains College	Brooklyn, NY
G	1	Lafayette Dorsey	6 ft 1 in (1.85 m)	170 lb (77 kg)	So	Dorsey	Los Angeles, CA
C	2	Amari McCray	6 ft 9 in (2.06 m)	304 lb (138 kg)	Jr	Ruston; Howard College	Ruston, LA
G	4	Roberto Gallinat	6 ft 3 in (1.91 m)	180 lb (82 kg)	Sr	South Gwinnett; South Plains College	Atlanta, GA
F	5	Anthony Townes	6 ft 6 in (1.98 m)	215 lb (98 kg)	Sr	Modesto Christian	Modesto, CA
G	11	Khy Kabellis	6 ft 5 in (1.96 m)	185 lb (84 kg)	RS Jr	Escondido; North Dakota State	Escondido, CA
F	13	Jeremiah Bailey	6 ft 6 in (1.98 m)	203 lb (92 kg)	So	Monroe Catholic; Pima College	Fairbanks, AK
G	14	Ajare Sanni	6 ft 2 in (1.88 m)	158 lb (72 kg)	Fr	Clear Lake	Houston, TX
G	22	Jahbril Price-Noel	6 ft 7 in (2.01 m)	202 lb (92 kg)	Fr	Southwest Christian Academy	Scarborough, ON
C	24	Namdi Okonkwo	7 ft 0 in (2.13 m)	220 lb (100 kg)	RS Sr	Westwind Prep; Portland State	Dallas, TX
G	25	Kendall Small	6 ft 0 in (1.83 m)	182 lb (83 kg)	RS Jr	Mayfair; Oregon	Lakewood, CA
F/C	35	Zach Cameron	6 ft 10 in (2.08 m)	207 lb (94 kg)	Jr	Brewster Academy; Mineral Area College	Sacramento, CA

Head coach

- Damon Stoudamire (Arizona)

Assistant coach(es)

- Leonard Perry (Idaho)
- Luke Wicks (Northern State)
- JayDee Luster (Wyoming)

Legend

- (C) Team captain
- (S) Suspended
- (I) Ineligible
- (W) Walk-on
- Injured
- Current redshirt

Roster

== Schedule and results ==
Date time, TV	Rank^{#}	Opponent^{#}	Result	Record	High points	High rebounds	High assists	Site (attendance) city, state
Non-conference regular season
November 6, 2018*; 5:00 pm, ESPN+		at SIU Edwardsville	W 74–65	1–0	18 – Dorsey	7 – Townes	6 – Tripp	Vadalabene Center (1,387); Edwardsville, IL
November 9, 2018*; 7:00 pm, ESPN3		at No. 7 Nevada	L 61–83	1–1	13 – Townes	8 – Tripp	3 – Tripp	Lawlor Events Center (10,561); Reno, NV
November 13, 2018*; 7:00 pm, Stadium		Stanislaus State	W 91–66	2–1	17 – Tripp	8 – Price-Noel	6 – Price-Noel	Alex G. Spanos Center (2,061); Stockton, CA
November 15, 2018*; 6:00 pm		at Idaho State	W 83–76	3–1	14 – Townes	8 – Cameron	5 – Tripp	Reed Gym (1,297); Pocatello, ID
November 20, 2018*; 7:00 pm		at UNLV	L 70–96	3–2	13 – Gallinat	5 – Tripp	3 – Price-Noel	Thomas & Mack Center (7,338); Paradise, NV
November 22, 2018*; 12:30 pm		UC Riverside; Pacific Classic	W 74–54	4–2	20 – Gallinat	12 – Tripp	4 – Tripp	Alex G. Spanos Center (384); Stockton, CA
November 23, 2018*; 5:30 pm		Abilene Christian; Pacific Classic	L 71–73	4–3	21 – Gallinat	7 – Bailey	2 – Tied	Alex G. Spanos Center (602); Stockton, CA
November 24, 2018*; 8:00 pm		Elon; Pacific Classic	W 65–57	5–3	19 – Dorsey	8 – Tripp	4 – Small	Alex G. Spanos Center (1,630); Stockton, CA
November 28, 2018*; 7:00 pm		at Fresno State	L 78–81 ^{OT}	5–4	32 – Sanni	8 – Tripp	4 – Tripp	Save Mart Center (5,494); Fresno, CA
December 1, 2018*; 7:00 pm		Air Force	W 82–69	6–4	19 – Dorsey	8 – Tripp	3 – Tripp	Alex G. Spanos Center (1,767); Stockton, CA
December 5, 2018*; 7:00 pm		UT Permian Basin	W 74–69	7–4	21 – Tripp	10 – Gallinat	3 – Tripp	Alex G. Spanos Center (1,230); Stockton, CA
December 10, 2018*; 7:00 pm		Long Beach State	W 74–68	8–4	31 – Dorsey	8 – Townes	6 – Small	Alex G. Spanos Center (1,247); Stockton, CA
December 16, 2018*; 3:00 pm		at Cal State Northridge	W 79–77	9–4	24 – Townes	7 – Townes	3 – Sanni	Matadome (565); Northridge, CA
December 22, 2018*; 1:00 pm		at Boise State	L 71–83	9–5	15 – Gallinat	7 – Townes	4 – Price-Noel	Taco Bell Arena (3,549); Boise, ID
December 29, 2018*; 7:00 pm		UC Irvine	W 84–75	10–5	23 – Sanni	10 – Townes	3 – Tripp	Alex G. Spanos Center (1,425); Stockton, CA
WCC regular season
January 3, 2019; 8:00 pm, ESPNU		at BYU	L 87–90	10–6 (0–1)	22 – Gallinat	8 – Cameron	3 – McGhee	Alex G. Spanos Center (2,490); Stockton, CA
January 5, 2019; 8:00 pm, SPCSN		at San Diego	L 64–73	10–7 (0–2)	24 – Tripp	5 – Tripp	3 – Sanni	Jenny Craig Pavilion (1,491); San Diego, CA
January 10, 2019; 8:00 pm, ESPN2		at No. 5 Gonzaga	L 36–67	10–8 (0–3)	9 – Gallinat	7 – Townes	2 – Gallinat	McCarthey Athletic Center (6,000); Spokane, WA
January 12, 2019; 7:00 pm, RTNW		at Portland	W 65–57	11–8 (1–3)	21 – Dorsey	11 – Tripp	3 – Tripp	Chiles Center (2,106); Portland, OR
January 17, 2019; 6:00 pm, NBCSBA		San Francisco	L 52–53	11–9 (1–4)	9 – Dorsey	5 – Dorsey	8 – Tripp	Alex G. Spanos Center (1,777); Stockton, CA
January 19, 2019; 7:00 pm		Santa Clara	L 57–69	11–10 (1–5)	25 – Gallinat	10 – Townes	4 – Tripp	Alex G. Spanos Center (1,879); Stockton, CA
January 26, 2019; 1:00 pm, SPCSN		Portland	W 74–70	12–10 (2–5)	16 – Gallinat	9 – Bailey	3 – Tripp	Alex G. Spanos Center (2,127); Stockton, CA
January 31, 2019; 7:30 pm		at Loyola Marymount	L 42–60	12–11 (2–6)	12 – Dorsey	6 – Tripp	3 – McGhee	Gersten Pavilion (861); Los Angeles, CA
February 2, 2019; 7:00 pm		Pepperdine	W 66–59	13–11 (3–6)	20 – Dorsey	7 – Dorsey	4 – Dorsey	Alex G. Spanos Center (2,731); Stockton, CA
February 7, 2019; 8:00 pm		at Saint Mary's	L 66–78	13–12 (3–7)	23 – Tripp	4 – Dorsey	6 – Tripp	McKeon Pavilion (2,764); Moraga, CA
February 9, 2019; 6:00 pm, BYUtv		at BYU	L 59–69	13–13 (3–8)	15 – Gallinat	13 – Townes	2 – Tied	Marriott Center (11,406); Provo, UT
February 16, 2019; 6:00 pm		at Santa Clara	L 59–64	13–14 (3–9)	13 – Kabellis	10 – Townes	4 – Kabellis	Leavey Center (1,929); Santa Clara, CA
February 21, 2019; 7:00 pm		Saint Mary's	L 32–58	13–15 (3–10)	8 – Bailey	5 – Townes	1 – Tied	Alex G. Spanos Center (2,343); Stockton, CA
February 23, 2019; 12:30 pm, SPCSN		Loyola Marymount	L 56–63	13–16 (3–11)	31 – Gallinat	8 – Tripp	5 – Tripp	Alex G. Spanos Center (2,066); Stockton, CA
February 28, 2019; 8:00 pm, ESPN2		No. 1 Gonzaga	L 66–86	13–17 (3–12)	23 – Gallinat	9 – Townes	3 – Kabellis	Alex G. Spanos Center (4,644); Stockton, CA
March 2, 2019; 5:00 pm		at Pepperdine	W 73–72	14–17 (4–12)	17 – Gallinat	9 – Gallinat	10 – Tripp	Firestone Fieldhouse (1,157); Malibu, CA
WCC tournament
March 7, 2019; 10:00 pm	(9)	vs. (8) Pepperdine; Opening round	L 53–61	14–18	22 – Bailey	11 – Bailey	2 – Dorsey	Orleans Arena; Paradise, NV
*Non-conference game. ^{#}Rankings from AP Poll. (#) Tournament seedings in parentheses. All times are in Pacific Time.
