= 2018–19 Santa Clara Broncos men's basketball team =

American college basketball season

2018–19 Santa Clara Broncos men's basketball
- Conference: West Coast Conference
- Record: 16–15 (8–8 WCC)
- Head coach: Herb Sendek (3rd season)
- Assistant coaches: Jason Ludwig; Scott Garson; Ryan Madry
- Home arena: Leavey Center

2018–19 West Coast Conference men's basketball standings
	Conf.				Overall
Team	W		L	PCT	W		L	PCT
No. 4 Gonzaga	16	–	0	1.000	33	–	4	.892
Saint Mary's †	11	–	5	.688	22	–	12	.647
BYU	11	–	5	.688	19	–	13	.594
San Francisco	9	–	7	.563	21	–	10	.677
Loyola Marymount	8	–	8	.500	22	–	12	.647
Santa Clara	8	–	8	.500	16	–	15	.516
San Diego	7	–	9	.438	21	–	15	.583
Pepperdine	6	–	10	.375	16	–	18	.471
Pacific	4	–	12	.250	14	–	18	.438
Portland	0	–	16	.000	7	–	25	.219
† 2019 WCC tournament winner Rankings from AP Poll

The 2018–19 Santa Clara Broncos men's basketball team represented Santa Clara University during the 2018–19 NCAA Division I men's basketball season. The Broncos were led by third-year head coach Herb Sendek and played their home games at the Leavey Center as members of the West Coast Conference.

== Previous season ==
The Broncos finished the 2017–18 season 11–20, 8–10 in WCC play to finish in seventh place. They lost in the first round of the WCC tournament to Pepperdine.

== Departures ==
Name	Number	Pos.	Height	Weight	Year	Hometown	Reason for departure
Julian Roche	0	C	6'11"	235	RS Freshman	Saint John, NB	Graduate transferred to Simon Fraser
Matt Turner	1	G	6'3"	175	Freshman	Trumbull, CT	Transferred to Marist
Jarvis Pugh	4	G	6'6"	210	RS Senior	Murphy, TX	Graduated
Henry Caruso	21	G/F	6'4"	195	Senior	San Mateo, CA	Graduated
Shaquille Walters	22	G/F	6'6"	190	Freshman	London, England	Transferred to Northeastern
Kai Healy	25	G	6'5"	210	Senior	Wahroonga, Australia	Graduated
Emmanuel Ndumanya	50	C	6'9"	267	RS Senior	Anambra, Nigeria	Graduated

=== Incoming transfers ===
Name	Number	Pos.	Height	Weight	Year	Hometown	Previous School
D. J. Mitchell	0	F	6'8"	215	Junior	Clovis, CA	Transferred from Wake Forest. Under NCAA transfer rules, Mitchell will have to sit out for the 2018–19 season. Will have two years of remaining eligibility.
Josh Martin	22	F	6'8"	220	RS Senior	Seattle, WA	Transferred from Cal Poly. Will be eligible to play immediately since Martin graduated from Cal Poly.
Fallou Ndoye	25	C	6'11"	225	RS Senior	Ta'if, Senegal	Transferred from Cal State Bakersfield. Will be eligible to play immediately since Ndoye graduated from Cal State Bakersfield.

== Recruiting ==
College recruiting information
Name	Hometown	School	Height	Weight	Commit date
Trey Wertz #61 SG	Charlotte, NC	Providence Day School	6 ft 5 in (1.96 m)	180 lb (82 kg)	Oct 22, 2017
Trey Wertz #61 SG	Recruit ratings: Scout: Rivals: (75)				
Keshawn Justice; F	Madison, WI	East High School	6 ft 4 in (1.93 m)	190 lb (86 kg)	Oct 23, 2017
Keshawn Justice; F	Recruit ratings: Rivals:				
Juan Ducasse; PF	Montevideo, Uruguay	Lee Academy	6 ft 9 in (2.06 m)	210 lb (95 kg)	Apr 30, 2017
Juan Ducasse; PF	Recruit ratings: No ratings found				
Guglielmo Caruso; PF	Naples, Italy	Generazione Vincente Cuore Napoli	6 ft 9 in (2.06 m)	210 lb (95 kg)	Jun 4, 2018
Guglielmo Caruso; PF	Recruit ratings: No ratings found				
Ezekiel Richards; C	Oak Park, CA	Oak Park High School	6 ft 11 in (2.11 m)	230 lb (100 kg)	Feb 10, 2018
Ezekiel Richards; C	Recruit ratings: No ratings found				
Overall recruit ranking: Scout: nr Rivals: nr ESPN: nr
Note: In many cases, Scout, Rivals, 247Sports, On3, and ESPN may conflict in their listings of height and weight.; In these cases, the average was taken. ESPN grades are on a 100-point scale.; Sources: "Santa Clara 2018 Basketball Commitments". Rivals.; "2018 Santa Clara Basketball Commits". Scout.; "ESPN". ESPN.; "Scout.com Team Recruiting Rankings". Scout.; "2018 Team Ranking". Rivals.

=== Recruiting class of 2019 ===
College recruiting information (2019)
Name	Hometown	School	Height	Weight	Commit date
Miguel Tomley; PG	Surrey, BC	Tamanawis Secondary School	6 ft 3 in (1.91 m)	185 lb (84 kg)	Jul 29, 2018
Miguel Tomley; PG	Recruit ratings: No ratings found				
Overall recruit ranking: Scout: nr Rivals: nr ESPN: nr
Note: In many cases, Scout, Rivals, 247Sports, On3, and ESPN may conflict in their listings of height and weight.; In these cases, the average was taken. ESPN grades are on a 100-point scale.; Sources: "Santa Clara 2019 Basketball Commitments". Rivals.; "2019 Santa Clara Basketball Commits". Scout.; "ESPN". ESPN.; "Scout.com Team Recruiting Rankings". Scout.; "2019 Team Ranking". Rivals.

== Roster ==
2018–19 Santa Clara Broncos men's basketball team
Players
Coaches

Pos.	#	Name	Height	Weight	Year	Previous school	Hometown
F	0	D. J. Mitchell (redshirt)	6 ft 8 in (2.03 m)	215 lb (98 kg)	Jr	Buchanan; Wake Forest	Clovis, CA
G	1	Trey Wertz	6 ft 5 in (1.96 m)	180 lb (82 kg)	Fr	Providence Day	Charlotte, NC
G	2	Tahj Eaddy	6 ft 1 in (1.85 m)	165 lb (75 kg)	RS So	Tennessee Prep; Southeast Missouri State	West Haven, CT
F	3	Henrik Jädersten	6 ft 11 in (2.11 m)	240 lb (109 kg)	Sr	Solna Gymnasium	Stockholm, Sweden
G	10	K. J. Feagin	6 ft 1 in (1.85 m)	190 lb (86 kg)	Sr	Long Beach Poly	Long Beach, CA
G	12	Matt Hauser	6 ft 1 in (1.85 m)	180 lb (82 kg)	Sr	Thousand Oaks	Thousand Oaks, CA
F	13	Josip Vrankic	6 ft 8 in (2.03 m)	205 lb (93 kg)	So	Wasatch Academy	Toronto, ON
F	14	Keshawn Justice	6 ft 4 in (1.93 m)	190 lb (86 kg)	Fr	Madison East	Madison, WI
F	15	Juan Ducasse	6 ft 9 in (2.06 m)	210 lb (95 kg)	Fr	Lee Academy	Montevideo, Uruguay
G	20	Johnny Swayer (W)	6 ft 2 in (1.88 m)	190 lb (86 kg)	Jr	DeMartha	Hyattsville, MD
F	22	Josh Martin	6 ft 7 in (2.01 m)	230 lb (104 kg)	RS Sr	Bothell; Cal Poly	Seattle, WA
C	23	Zeke Richards	6 ft 11 in (2.11 m)	230 lb (104 kg)	Fr	Oak Park	Oak Park, CA
C	25	Fallou Ndoye	6 ft 11 in (2.11 m)	225 lb (102 kg)	RS Sr	Findlay Prep; Cal State Bakersfield	Taif, Senegal
F	30	Guglielmo Caruso	6 ft 9 in (2.06 m)	210 lb (95 kg)	Fr	Cuore Napoli Basket Team	Naples, Italy
G	33	Matt Jasaitis (W)	5 ft 11 in (1.8 m)	170 lb (77 kg)	RS Sr	Loyola; Grinnell College	Manhattan Beach, CA

Head coach

- Herb Sendek (Carnegie Mellon)

Assistant coach(es)

- Jason Ludwig (UCLA)
- Scott Garson (UC Santa Barbara)
- Ryan Madry (West Georgia)

Legend

- (C) Team captain
- (S) Suspended
- (I) Ineligible
- (W) Walk-on
- Injured
- Current redshirt

Roster

== Schedule and results ==
Date time, TV	Rank^{#}	Opponent^{#}	Result	Record	High points	High rebounds	High assists	Site (attendance) city, state
Non-conference regular season
November 9, 2018*; 7:00 pm		Prairie View A&M	L 64–81	0–1	15 – Justice	13 – Martin	4 – Eaddy	Leavey Center (1,621); Santa Clara, CA
November 15, 2018*; 7:00 pm		UC Irvine	L 49–61	0–2	11 – Eaddy	7 – Eaddy	4 – Wertz	Leavey Center (1,304); Santa Clara, CA
November 18, 2018*; 5:00 pm, ESPN3		vs. Washington; Vancouver Showcase	L 68–82	0–3	21 – Vrankic	6 – Caruso	5 – Wertz	Vancouver Convention Centre (3,107); Vancouver, BC
November 20, 2018*; 6:00 pm, BTN		vs. Minnesota; Vancouver Showcase	L 66–80	0–4	20 – Eaddy	8 – Martin	4 – Eaddy	Vancouver Convention Centre (3,070); Vancouver, BC
November 24, 2018*; 3:00 pm		at San Jose State	W 71–63	1–4	23 – Eaddy	7 – Vrankic	10 – Wertz	Event Center Arena (1,665); San Jose, CA
November 26, 2018*; 6:00 pm, P12N		at California	L 66–78	1–5	16 – Wertz	14 – Martin	4 – Eaddy	Haas Pavilion (4,116); Berkeley, CA
November 29, 2018*; 7:00 pm		Jackson State	W 81–70	2–5	33 – Wertz	14 – Martin	5 – Wertz	Leavey Center (1,029); Santa Clara, CA
December 1, 2018*; 4:00 pm		Northern Arizona	W 81–74	3–5	22 – Eaddy	14 – Vrankic	7 – Martin	Leavey Center (1,817); Santa Clara, CA
December 7, 2018*; 7:00 pm		Idaho State	L 66–68	3–6	17 – Eaddy	11 – Martin	8 – Eaddy	Leavey Center (1,124); Santa Clara, CA
December 9, 2018*; 2:00 pm		Sonoma State	W 82–54	4–6	19 – Vrankic	8 – Martin	6 – Eaddy	Leavey Center (1,316); Santa Clara, CA
December 13, 2018*; 7:00 pm		Mississippi Valley State	W 82–54	5–6	16 – Justice	12 – Martin	5 – Eaddy	Leavey Center (862); Santa Clara, CA
December 18, 2018*; 7:00 pm		USC	W 102–92 ^{2OT}	6–6	28 – Wertz	18 – Martin	8 – Eaddy	Leavey Center (2,226); Santa Clara, CA
December 21, 2018*; 7:00 pm		Idaho	W 77–56	7–6	13 – Martin	8 – Martin	10 – Wertz	Leavey Center (1,109); Santa Clara, CA
December 29, 2018*; 11:00 am, P12N		vs. Washington State; Spokane Showcase	W 79–71	8–6	16 – Eaddy	8 – Eaddy	7 – Wertz	Spokane Arena (2,723); Spokane, WA
WCC regular season
January 3, 2019; 7:00 pm		San Diego	W 68–56	9–6 (1–0)	30 – Eaddy	13 – Martin	4 – Wertz	Leavey Center (1,513); Santa Clara, CA
January 5, 2019; 6:00 pm, NBCSCA		at No. 7 Gonzaga	L 48–91	9–7 (1–1)	14 – Justice	8 – Caruso	5 – Wertz	McCarthey Athletic Center (6,000); Spokane, WA
January 10, 2019; 8:00 pm, NBCSBA		Pepperdine	W 67–64	10–7 (2–1)	28 – Eaddy	11 – Vrankic	8 – Wertz	Leavey Center (1,650); Santa Clara, CA
January 12, 2019; 6:00 pm, BYUtv		at BYU	L 74–80	10–8 (2–2)	20 – Wertz	10 – Vrankic	5 – Wertz	Marriott Center (12,709); Provo, UT
January 17, 2019; 8:00 pm, NBCSBA		at Saint Mary's	L 55–75	10–9 (2–3)	16 – Caruso	5 – Caruso	3 – Wertz	McKeon Pavilion (3,261); Moraga, CA
January 19, 2019; 7:00 pm		at Pacific	W 69–57	11–9 (3–3)	18 – Eaddy	10 – Vrankic	5 – Wertz	Alex G. Spanos Center (1,879); Stockton, CA
January 24, 2019; 8:00 pm, KHQ/RTNW		No. 4 Gonzaga	L 39–98	11–10 (3–4)	12 – Vrankic	6 – Vrankic	3 – Justice	Leavey Center (5,094); Santa Clara, CA
January 26, 2019; 6:00 pm		Loyola Marymount	L 61–69	11–11 (3–5)	13 – Wertz	11 – Martin	5 – Wertz	Leavey Center (2,133); Santa Clara, CA
February 2, 2019; 6:00 pm		Portland	W 69–63 ^{OT}	12–11 (4–5)	17 – Justice	12 – Martin	3 – Wertz	Leavey Center (2,226); Santa Clara, CA
February 7, 2019; 7:00 pm		at Pepperdine	W 79–71	13–11 (5–5)	26 – Vrankic	9 – Vrankic	5 – Wertz	Firestone Fieldhouse (874); Malibu, CA
February 9, 2019; 8:00 pm, NBCSBA		at San Francisco	L 72–78	13–12 (5–6)	24 – Vrankic	15 – Vrankic	3 – Justice	War Memorial Gymnasium (3,005); San Francisco, CA
February 14, 2019; 8:00 pm, ESPNU		Saint Mary's	L 55–66	13–13 (5–7)	13 – Eaddy	8 – Martin	3 – Wertz	Leavey Center (2,176); Santa Clara, CA
February 16, 2019; 6:00 pm		Pacific	W 64–59	14–13 (6–7)	18 – Vrankic	10 – Martin	9 – Wertz	Leavey Center (1,929); Santa Clara, CA
February 23, 2019; 8:00 pm, NBCSCA		San Francisco	W 68–65	15–13 (7–7)	20 – Vrankic	9 – Vrankic	2 – Tied	Leavey Center (3,125); Santa Clara, CA
February 28, 2019; 8:00 pm, SPCSN		at Loyola Marymount	L 70–72	15–14 (7–8)	28 – Eaddy	7 – Caruso	6 – Justice	Gersten Pavilion (1,150); Los Angeles, CA
March 2, 2019; 7:00 pm		at Portland	W 78–62	16–14 (8–8)	26 – Eaddy	6 – Caruso	9 – Wertz	Chiles Center (3,007); Portland, OR
WCC tournament
March 8, 2019; 8:00 pm, TheW.tv	(6)	vs. (7) San Diego; Second round	L 45–62	16–15	12 – Wertz	9 – Martin	3 – Wertz	Orleans Arena; Paradise, NV
*Non-conference game. ^{#}Rankings from AP Poll. (#) Tournament seedings in parentheses. All times are in Pacific Time.
