= 2018–19 Saint Mary's Gaels men's basketball team =

American college basketball season

2018–19 Saint Mary's Gaels men's basketball

WCC Tournament champions

NCAA tournament, First Round
- Conference: West Coast Conference
- Record: 22–12 (11–5 WCC)
- Head coach: Randy Bennett (18th season)
- Assistant coaches: Marcus Schroeder; Danny Yoshikawa; Justin Joyner
- Home arena: McKeon Pavilion

2018–19 West Coast Conference men's basketball standings
	Conf.				Overall
Team	W		L	PCT	W		L	PCT
No. 4 Gonzaga	16	–	0	1.000	33	–	4	.892
Saint Mary's †	11	–	5	.688	22	–	12	.647
BYU	11	–	5	.688	19	–	13	.594
San Francisco	9	–	7	.563	21	–	10	.677
Loyola Marymount	8	–	8	.500	22	–	12	.647
Santa Clara	8	–	8	.500	16	–	15	.516
San Diego	7	–	9	.438	21	–	15	.583
Pepperdine	6	–	10	.375	16	–	18	.471
Pacific	4	–	12	.250	14	–	18	.438
Portland	0	–	16	.000	7	–	25	.219
† 2019 WCC tournament winner Rankings from AP Poll

The 2018–19 Saint Mary's Gaels men's basketball team represented Saint Mary's College of California during the 2018–19 NCAA Division I men's basketball season. The team was led by head coach Randy Bennett in his 18th season at Saint Mary's. The Gaels played their home games at the McKeon Pavilion in Moraga, California as members of the West Coast Conference. They finished the season 22–12, to finish in 2nd place. In the WCC Tournament, they defeated San Diego in the semifinals and beat Gonzaga in the championship to win the WCC Tournament. Therefore, they received an automatic bid to the NCAA Tournament and they lost in the first round to Villanova.

== Previous season ==
The Gaels finished the 2017–18 season 30–6, 16–2 in West Coast Conference play to finish in second place. As the No. 2 seed in the WCC tournament, they defeated Pepperdine in the quarterfinals before losing to BYU in the semifinals. They were one of the last four teams not selected for the NCAA tournament and as a result earned a No. 1 seed in the National Invitation Tournament where they defeated Southeastern Louisiana in the first round and Washington in the second round before losing to Utah in the quarterfinals.

== Offseason ==
=== Departures ===
Name	Number	Pos.	Height	Weight	Year	Hometown	Reason for departure
Emmett Naar	3	G	6'1"	195	RS Senior	Sydney, Australia	Graduated
Evan Fitzner	21	C	6'10"	230	RS Junior	San Diego, CA	Graduate transferred to Indiana
Calvin Hermanson	24	F	6'6"	200	RS Senior	Lake Oswego, OR	Graduated
Jock Landale	34	C	6'11"	255	Senior	Malvern East, Australia	Graduated
Cullen Neal	34	G	6'4"	191	RS Senior	Albuquerque, NM	Graduated

=== Incoming transfers ===
Name	Number	Pos.	Height	Weight	Year	Hometown	Previous school
Aaron Menzies	41	C	7'3"	285	RS Senior	Manchester, England	Transferred from Seattle. Will eligible to play since Menzies graduated from Seattle.

=== 2018 recruiting class ===
College recruiting information
Name	Hometown	School	Height	Weight	Commit date
Matthias Tass; C	Tallinn, Estonia	Tallinna Reaalkool	6 ft 10 in (2.08 m)	220 lb (100 kg)	Sep 26, 2017
Matthias Tass; C	Recruit ratings: Scout: Rivals:				
Quinn Clinton; PG	Christchurch, New Zealand	Christchurch Boys' High School	6 ft 4 in (1.93 m)	180 lb (82 kg)	
Quinn Clinton; PG	Recruit ratings: No ratings found				
Alex Mudronja; PG	Adelaide, Australia	Australia Institute of Sport	6 ft 5 in (1.96 m)	175 lb (79 kg)	
Alex Mudronja; PG	Recruit ratings: No ratings found				
Dan Fotu; SF	New Zealand	New Zealand Breakers	6 ft 7 in (2.01 m)	N/A	
Dan Fotu; SF	Recruit ratings: No ratings found				
Overall recruit ranking: Scout: nr Rivals: nr ESPN: nr
Note: In many cases, Scout, Rivals, 247Sports, On3, and ESPN may conflict in their listings of height and weight.; In these cases, the average was taken. ESPN grades are on a 100-point scale.; Sources: "ESPN". ESPN.; "2018 Team Ranking". Rivals.

== Roster ==
2018–19 Saint Mary's Gaels men's basketball team
Players
Coaches

Pos.	#	Name	Height	Weight	Year	Previous school	Hometown
G	00	Tanner Krebs	6 ft 6 in (1.98 m)	200 lb (91 kg)	RS Jr	Lake Ginninderra College	Hobart, Australia
C	1	Jordan Hunter	6 ft 10 in (2.08 m)	230 lb (104 kg)	Sr	St. Ignatius College	Vaucluse, NSW, Australia
G	2	Quinn Clinton	6 ft 3 in (1.91 m)	190 lb (86 kg)	Fr	Christchurch Boys	Christchurch, New Zealand
G	3	Jordan Ford	6 ft 1 in (1.85 m)	175 lb (79 kg)	Jr	Folsom	Folsom, CA
C	5	Jock Perry	7 ft 1 in (2.16 m)	250 lb (113 kg)	RS So	Lake Ginninderra College	Melbourne, Australia
F	10	Elijah Thomas	6 ft 5 in (1.96 m)	220 lb (100 kg)	RS So	Sunrise Mountain	Peoria, AZ
F/C	11	Matthias Tass	6 ft 10 in (2.08 m)	240 lb (109 kg)	Fr	Tallinn Secondary School of Science	Tallinn, Estonia
G	12	Tommy Kuhse (W)	6 ft 2 in (1.88 m)	180 lb (82 kg)	RS So	Mountain View	Mesa, AZ
F	15	Dan Sheets (W)	6 ft 5 in (1.96 m)	205 lb (93 kg)	RS Jr	Dougherty Valley	San Ramon, CA
G	23	Kristers Zoriks	6 ft 4 in (1.93 m)	190 lb (86 kg)	RS Fr	New Hampton School	Dobele, Latvia
F	24	Malik Fitts	6 ft 8 in (2.03 m)	230 lb (104 kg)	RS So	Brewster Academy; South Florida	Rancho Cucamonga, CA
F	33	Kyle Clark	6 ft 7 in (2.01 m)	220 lb (100 kg)	RS Jr	Hellyer College	Wynyard, TAS, Australia
G	35	Alex Mudronja	6 ft 5 in (1.96 m)	195 lb (88 kg)	Fr	UC Senior Secondary College	Adelaide, Australia
C	41	Aaron Menzies	7 ft 3 in (2.21 m)	265 lb (120 kg)	RS Sr	Loreto Academy	Manchester, England
F	42	Dan Fotu	6 ft 7 in (2.01 m)	220 lb (100 kg)	Fr	New Zealand	Auckland, New Zealand

Head coach

- Randy Bennett (UC San Diego)

Assistant coach(es)

- Marcus Schroeder (Princeton)
- Danny Yoshikawa (UC Davis)
- Justin Joyner (UC Santa Barbara)

Legend

- (C) Team captain
- (S) Suspended
- (I) Ineligible
- (W) Walk-on
- Injured
- Current redshirt

Roster

== Schedule and results ==
Date time, TV	Rank^{#}	Opponent^{#}	Result	Record	Site (attendance) city, state
Non-conference regular season
November 7, 2018*; 7:00 pm		McNeese State; MGM Resorts Main Event campus-site game	W 87–65	1–0	McKeon Pavilion (2,673); Moraga, CA
November 11, 2018*; 5:00 pm		Utah Valley; MGM Resorts Main Event campus-site game	W 92–63	2–0	McKeon Pavilion (2,751); Moraga, CA
November 14, 2018*; 6:00 pm, FCS/Eleven		at New Mexico State	W 73–58	3–0	Pan American Center (6,660); Las Cruces, NM
November 19, 2018*; 5:30 pm, ESPN3		vs. Utah State; MGM Resorts Main Event Heavyweight semifinals	L 63–80	3–1	T-Mobile Arena; Paradise, NV
November 21, 2018*; 5:30 pm, BD Global		vs. No. 15 Mississippi State; MGM Resorts Main Event Heavyweight 3rd place game	L 57–61	3–2	T-Mobile Arena; Paradise, NV
November 24, 2018*; 6:00 pm		Harvard	L 68–74	3–3	McKeon Pavilion (3,247); Moraga, CA
November 28, 2018*; 7:00 pm		UC Irvine	L 75–80	3–4	McKeon Pavilion (2,511); Moraga, CA
December 1, 2018*; 7:00 pm, ESPNU		California	W 84–71	4–4	McKeon Pavilion (3,500); Moraga, CA
December 4, 2018*; 7:00 pm		Bethune–Cookman	W 93–61	5–4	McKeon Pavilion (2,307); Moraga, CA
December 7, 2018*; 4:00 pm, Flo Sports		vs. New Mexico; Basketball Hall of Fame Classic	W 85–60	6–4	Staples Center (7,235); Los Angeles, CA
December 10, 2018*; 7:00 pm		Cal State Fullerton	W 81–66	7–4	McKeon Pavilion (2,429); Moraga, CA
December 15, 2018*; 7:30 pm, ESPNU		vs. LSU; Neon Hoops Showcase	L 74–78	7–5	T-Mobile Arena (5,107); Paradise, NV
December 19, 2018*; 7:00 pm		Bucknell	W 85–56	8–5	McKeon Pavilion (2,622); Moraga, CA
December 22, 2018*; 12:00 pm		at Western Kentucky	L 68–71	8–6	E. A. Diddle Arena (5,026); Bowling Green, KY
December 29, 2018*; 5:00 pm		San Jose State	W 75–45	9–6	McKeon Pavilion (3,500); Moraga, CA
WCC regular season
January 3, 2019; 8:00 pm, ESPN2		at San Francisco	L 72–76	9–7 (0–1)	War Memorial Gymnasium (3,005); San Francisco, CA
January 5, 2019; 8:00 pm, ESPN2		BYU	W 88–66	10–7 (1–1)	McKeon Pavilion (3,500); Moraga, CA
January 12, 2019; 7:00 pm, NBCSBA		at Loyola Marymount	W 71–60	11–7 (2–1)	Gersten Pavilion (1,703); Los Angeles, CA
January 17, 2019; 8:00 pm, NBCSBA		Santa Clara	W 75–55	12–7 (3–1)	McKeon Pavilion (3,261); Moraga, CA
January 19, 2019; 6:00 pm, NBCSBA		San Diego	W 76–59	13–7 (4–1)	McKeon Pavilion (3,389); Moraga, CA
January 24, 2019; 8:00 pm, ESPN2		at BYU	L 66–71	13–8 (4–2)	Marriott Center (11,427); Provo, UT
January 26, 2019; 5:00 pm, NBCSCA		Pepperdine	L 77–84 ^{OT}	13–9 (4–3)	McKeon Pavilion (1,815); Moraga, CA
February 2, 2019; 1:00 pm, NBCSCA		San Francisco	W 86–80	14–9 (5–3)	McKeon Pavilion (3,500); Moraga, CA
February 7, 2019; 8:00 pm, ESPNU		Pacific	W 78–66	15–9 (6–3)	McKeon Pavilion (2,764); Moraga, CA
February 9, 2019; 7:00 pm, ESPN2		at No. 4 Gonzaga; Rivalry	L 46–94	15–10 (6–4)	McCarthey Athletic Center (6,000); Spokane, WA
February 14, 2019; 8:00 pm, ESPNU		at Santa Clara	W 66–55	16–10 (7–4)	Leavey Center (2,176); Santa Clara, CA
February 16, 2019; 8:00 pm, NBCSBA		Pepperdine	W 72–65	17–10 (8–4)	McKeon Pavilion (3,500); Moraga, CA
February 21, 2019; 7:00 pm		at Pacific	W 58–32	18–10 (9–4)	Alex G. Spanos Center (2,343); Stockton, CA
February 23, 2019; 6:00 pm		at San Diego	W 66–46	19–10 (10–4)	Jenny Craig Pavilion (3,189); San Diego, CA
February 28, 2019; 8:00 pm, NBCSCA		Portland	W 65–48	20–10 (11–4)	McKeon Pavilion (3,254); Moraga, CA
March 2, 2019; 7:00 pm, ESPN		No. 1 Gonzaga; Rivalry	L 55–69	20–11 (11–5)	McKeon Pavilion (3,500); Moraga, CA
WCC tournament
March 11, 2019; 8:30 pm, ESPN2	(2)	vs. (7) San Diego; Semifinals	W 69–62	21–11	Orleans Arena (7,642); Paradise, NV
March 12, 2019; 6:00 pm, ESPN	(2)	vs. (1) No. 1 Gonzaga; Championship/Rivalry	W 60–47	22–11	Orleans Arena (7,771); Paradise, NV
NCAA tournament
March 21, 2019*; 4:20 pm, TBS	(11 S)	vs. (6 S) No. 23 Villanova; First Round	L 57–61	22–12	XL Center (14,695); Hartford, CT
*Non-conference game. ^{#}Rankings from AP Poll. (#) Tournament seedings in parentheses. S=South. All times are in Pacific Time.
