= 2018–19 Pepperdine Waves men's basketball team =

American college basketball season

2018–19 Pepperdine Waves men's basketball
- Conference: West Coast Conference
- Record: 16–18 (6–10 WCC)
- Head coach: Lorenzo Romar (1st, 4th overall season)
- Assistant coaches: Ken Bone; Curtis Allen; Reggie Morris Jr.
- Home arena: Firestone Fieldhouse

2018–19 West Coast Conference men's basketball standings
	Conf.				Overall
Team	W		L	PCT	W		L	PCT
No. 4 Gonzaga	16	–	0	1.000	33	–	4	.892
Saint Mary's †	11	–	5	.688	22	–	12	.647
BYU	11	–	5	.688	19	–	13	.594
San Francisco	9	–	7	.563	21	–	10	.677
Loyola Marymount	8	–	8	.500	22	–	12	.647
Santa Clara	8	–	8	.500	16	–	15	.516
San Diego	7	–	9	.438	21	–	15	.583
Pepperdine	6	–	10	.375	16	–	18	.471
Pacific	4	–	12	.250	14	–	18	.438
Portland	0	–	16	.000	7	–	25	.219
† 2019 WCC tournament winner Rankings from AP Poll

The 2018–19 Pepperdine Waves men's basketball team represented Pepperdine University during the 2018–19 NCAA Division I men's basketball season. The Waves were led by head coach Lorenzo Romar, in the first season of his second stint after coaching the Waves from 1996 to 1999. They played their home games at the Firestone Fieldhouse in Malibu, California as members of the West Coast Conference. They finished the season 16–18, 8–10 in WCC play to finish in eighth place. They defeated Pacific, Loyola Marymount, and San Francisco to advance to the semifinals of the WCC tournament where they were defeated by Gonzaga.

== Previous season ==
The Waves finished the 2016–17 season 6–26, 2–16 in WCC play to finish in last place. They defeated Santa Clara in the first round of the WCC tournament before losing in the quarterfinals to Saint Mary's.

On February 13, 2018, the school announced that head coach Marty Wilson would not return as head coach following the end of the season. He finished at Pepperdine with a seven-year record of 88–129 (91–139 when including his 3–10 record as interim head coach in 1995–96). On March 12, the school hired Lorenzo Romar as head coach. Romar returned to Pepperdine where he started his head coaching career in 1996.

== Offseason ==
=== Departures ===
Name	Number	Pos.	Height	Weight	Year	Hometown	Reason for departure
Amadi Udenyi	0	G	6'0"	195	RS Senior	Oakland, CA	Graduated
Elijah Lee	1	G	5'10"	160	Sophomore	Houston, TX	Graduate transferred to Midwestern State
Trae Berhow	11	G	6'5"	195	Freshman	Watertown, MN	Transferred to Northern Iowa
Caleb Martin	15	G	6'2"	190	Sophomore	Los Angeles, CA	Walk-on; left the team for personal reasons
Knox Hellums	21	G	6'5"	195	Sophomore	Tomball, TX	Transferred to UTSA
Harrison Meads	22	F	6'7"	215	Junior	New Plymouth, New Zealand	Left the team for personal reasons
Nolan Taylor	31	F	6'7"	260	Sophomore	Keller, TX	Transferred to Cal Poly
Kevin Hempy	34	F	6'6"	200	RS Senior	Santa Barbara, CA	Walk-on; graduated
Matthew Atewe	41	F/C	6'9"	250	RS Senior	Toronto, ON	Graduated

=== Incoming transfers ===
Name	Number	Pos.	Height	Weight	Year	Hometown	Previous school
Keith Smith	11	F	6'7"	215	Junior	Seattle, WA	Transferred from Oregon. Under NCAA transfer rules, Smith will sit out the 2018–19 season. Will have two years of remaining eligibility.
M. J. Cage	35	F	6'10"	225	RS Sophomore	Santa Ana, CA	Transferred from Oregon. Under NCAA transfer rules, Cage will sit out the 2018–19 season. Will have three years of remaining eligibility.

=== Recruiting class of 2018 ===
College recruiting
Name	Hometown	School	Height	Weight	Commit date
Darryl Polk #86 PG	Long Beach, CA	Long Beach Polytechnic High School	5 ft 6 in (1.68 m)	135 lb (61 kg)	
Darryl Polk #86 PG	Recruit ratings: Scout: Rivals: (59)				
Andre Ball #73 SF	Chino Hills, CA	Chino Hills High School	6 ft 5 in (1.96 m)	170 lb (77 kg)	
Andre Ball #73 SF	Recruit ratings: Scout: Rivals: (75)				
Kessler Edwards #73 SF	Etiwanda, CA	Etiwanda High School	6 ft 5 in (1.96 m)	170 lb (77 kg)	
Kessler Edwards #73 SF	Recruit ratings: Scout: Rivals: (75)				
Jackson Stormo; C	Santa Barbara, CA	San Marcos High School	6 ft 9 in (2.06 m)	260 lb (120 kg)	
Jackson Stormo; C	Recruit ratings: Scout: Rivals: (0)				
Victor Ohia Obioha; C	Owerri, Nigeria	Hillcrest High School	6 ft 9 in (2.06 m)	N/A	
Victor Ohia Obioha; C	Recruit ratings: Scout: Rivals: (0)				
Overall recruit ranking: Scout: nr Rivals: nr ESPN: nr
Note: In many cases, Scout, Rivals, 247Sports, On3, and ESPN may conflict in their listings of height and weight.; In these cases, the average was taken. ESPN grades are on a 100-point scale.; Sources: "Pepperdine Waves 2018 Basketball Commitments". Rivals.; "2018 Pepperdine Waves Basketball Commits". Scout.; "ESPN 2018 Pepperdine Waves Basketball recruits". ESPN.; "Scout.com Team Recruiting Rankings". Scout.; "2018 Team Ranking". Rivals.

== Roster ==
2018–19 Pepperdine Waves men's basketball team
Players
Coaches

Pos.	#	Name	Height	Weight	Year	Previous school	Hometown
G	2	Darryl Polk Jr.	5 ft 10 in (1.78 m)	145 lb (66 kg)	Fr	Long Beach Poly HS	Long Beach, CA
G	3	Michael Wexler (W)	5 ft 11 in (1.8 m)	175 lb (79 kg)	RS Fr	Benilde-St. Margaret's School	Plymouth, MN
G	4	Colbey Ross	6 ft 1 in (1.85 m)	180 lb (82 kg)	So	Eaglecrest HS	Aurora, CO
G	5	Jade' Smith	6 ft 4 in (1.93 m)	175 lb (79 kg)	So	St. Joseph Notre Dame HS	Oakland, CA
F	10	Andre Ball	6 ft 7 in (2.01 m)	190 lb (86 kg)	Fr	Chino Hills HS	Chino Hills, CA
F	11	Keith Smith (redshirt)	6 ft 7 in (2.01 m)	205 lb (93 kg)	RS So	Rainier Beach HS; Oregon	Seattle, WA
F	12	Darnell Dunn	6 ft 6 in (1.98 m)	205 lb (93 kg)	Sr	Kinston HS; Miami Dade JC	Kinston, NC
G	14	Jay Yoon (W)	6 ft 4 in (1.93 m)	195 lb (88 kg)	Fr	Arcadia HS	Arcadia, CA
F	15	Kessler Edwards	6 ft 8 in (2.03 m)	190 lb (86 kg)	Fr	Etiwanda HS	Rancho Cucamonga, CA
F	20	Kameron Edwards	6 ft 6 in (1.98 m)	230 lb (104 kg)	RS Jr	Etiwanda HS	Rancho Cucamonga, CA
G	21	Eric Cooper, Jr.	6 ft 3 in (1.91 m)	190 lb (86 kg)	RS Jr	IMG Academy; Nevada	Ontario, CA
F	25	Everett Perrot (W)	6 ft 6 in (1.98 m)	215 lb (98 kg)	Fr	Christian Brothers HS	Elk Grove, CA
G	32	Kaijae Yee-Stephens	6 ft 1 in (1.85 m)	190 lb (86 kg)	RS So	Santa Cruz HS	Santa Cruz, CA
C	33	Erik Mailliard (W)	6 ft 10 in (2.08 m)	210 lb (95 kg)	RS Fr	Parish Episcopal School	Dallas, TX
C	34	Victor Ohia Obioha	6 ft 9 in (2.06 m)	200 lb (91 kg)	Fr	Hillcrest HS	Owerri, Nigeria
F	35	M. J. Cage (redshirt)	6 ft 10 in (2.08 m)	225 lb (102 kg)	Jr	Mater Dei HS; Oregon	Santa Ana, CA
C	50	Jackson Stormo	6 ft 7 in (2.01 m)	260 lb (118 kg)	Fr	San Marcos HS	Santa Barbara, California

Head coach

- Lorenzo Romar (Washington)

Assistant coach(es)

- Ken Bone (Seattle Pacific)
- Curtis Allen (Washington)
- Reggie Morris, Jr. (Howard)

Legend

- (C) Team captain
- (S) Suspended
- (I) Ineligible
- (W) Walk-on
- Injured
- Current redshirt

Roster

== Schedule and results ==
Date time, TV	Rank^{#}	Opponent^{#}	Result	Record	High points	High rebounds	High assists	Site (attendance) city, state
Non conference regular season
November 7, 2018*; 7:00 pm		Cal State Dominguez Hills	W 100–66	1–0	20 – Cooper Jr.	13 – Edwards	7 – Ross	Firestone Fieldhouse (1,027); Malibu, CA
November 13, 2018*; 6:00 pm, PlutoTV		at Northern Colorado	W 88–80	1–1	22 – Edwards	9 – Edwards	4 – Ross	Bank of Colorado Arena (1,778); Greeley, CO
November 16, 2018*; 5:00 pm		vs. Towson; The Islands of the Bahamas Showcase quarterfinals	W 74–65	2–1	23 – Ross	5 – Smith	5 – Ross	Kendal Isaacs National Gymnasium (342); Nassau, Bahamas
November 17, 2018*; 5:00 pm		vs. Georgia Southern; The Islands of the Bahamas Showcase semifinals	L 78–88	2–2	25 – Ross	9 – Edwards	5 – Ross	Kendal Isaacs National Gymnasium (523); Nassau, Bahamas
November 18, 2018*; 2:00 pm		vs. Miami (OH); The Islands of the Bahamas Showcase 3rd place game	W 86–80	3–2	25 – Ross	6 – Cooper Jr.	5 – Ross	Kendal Isaacs National Gymnasium (427); Nassau, Bahamas
November 26, 2018*; 7:00 pm		Idaho State	W 97–82	4–2	23 – Cooper Jr.	7 – Edwards	11 – Ross	Firestone Fieldhouse (625); Malibu, CA
December 1, 2018*; 5:00 pm		Abilene Christian	W 77–62	5–2	19 – Edwards	9 – Ross	8 – Ross	Firestone Fieldhouse (1,044); Malibu, CA
December 3, 2018*; 7:00 pm		Cal State Northridge	L 83–90	5–3	24 – Ross	8 – Dunn	11 – Ross	Firestone Fieldhouse (1,215); Malibu, CA
December 6, 2018*; 7:00 pm		at UC Riverside	L 71–75	5–4	19 – Ross	6 – Smith	6 – Ross	Student Recreation Center Arena (414); Riverside, CA
December 8, 2018*; 7:00 pm		Jackson State	W 69–66	6–4	21 – Ross	11 – Edwards	6 – Ross	Firestone Fieldhouse (715); Malibu, CA
December 15, 2018*; 12:00 pm		at Southern Utah	L 69–78 ^{OT}	6–5	24 – Ross	10 – Smith	7 – Ross	America First Events Center (1,772); Cedar City, UT
December 17, 2018*; 7:00 pm, P12N		at Oregon State	L 67–82	6–6	15 – Ross	6 – Smith	8 – Ross	Gill Coliseum (3,534); Corvallis, OR
December 20, 2018*; 7:00 pm		at Long Beach State	L 66–67	6–7	23 – Ross	11 – Smith	5 – Ross	Walter Pyramid (1,679); Long Beach, CA
December 31, 2018*; 3:00 pm		Alabama A&M	W 100–64	7–7	19 – Smith	6 – Dunn	13 – Ross	Firestone Fieldhouse (725); Malibu, CA
WCC regular season
January 3, 2019; 7:00 pm, SPCSN		Loyola Marymount	W 77–62	8–7 (1–0)	15 – Smith	8 – Smith	12 – Ross	Firestone Fieldhouse (1,118); Malibu, CA
January 5, 2019; 5:00 pm		San Francisco	L 69–72	8–8 (1–1)	19 – Edwards	11 – Edwards	4 – Edwards	Firestone Fieldhouse (1,518); Malibu, CA
January 10, 2019; 8:00 pm		at Santa Clara	L 64–67	8–9 (1–2)	13 – Edwards	11 – Edwards	10 – Ross	Leavey Center (1,650); Santa Clara, CA
January 12, 2019; 1:00 pm, SPCSN		at San Diego	W 76–71	9–9 (2–2)	27 – Ross	8 – Edwards	3 – Ross	Jenny Craig Pavilion (1,693); San Diego, CA
January 17, 2019; 8:00 pm, ESPNU		BYU	L 76–87	9–10 (2–3)	24 – Ross	9 – Smith	5 – Ross	Firestone Fieldhouse (1,714); Malibu, CA
January 19, 2019; 1:00 pm, SPCSN		at Loyola Marymount	L 70–74	9–11 (2–4)	22 – Edwards	6 – Edwards	10 – Ross	Gersten Pavilion (1,646); Los Angeles, CA
January 26, 2019; 5:00 pm, SPCSN		Saint Mary's	W 84–77 ^{OT}	10–11 (3–4)	29 – Ross	9 – Smith	9 – Ross	Firestone Fieldhouse (1,815); Malibu, CA
January 31, 2019; 7:00 pm		at Portland	W 83–58	11–11 (4–4)	14 – Edwards	12 – Edwards	9 – Ross	Chiles Center (1,751); Portland, OR
February 2, 2019; 7:00 pm		at Pacific	L 59–66	11–12 (4–5)	16 – Edwards	12 – Edwards	2 – Cooper Jr.	Alex G. Spanos Center (2,731); Stockton, CA
February 7, 2019; 7:00 pm		Santa Clara	L 71–79	11–13 (4–6)	20 – Ross	8 – Edwards	10 – Ross	Firestone Fieldhouse (874); Malibu, CA
February 9, 2019; 1:00 pm, SPCSN		San Diego	W 70–67	12–13 (5–6)	19 – Ross	10 – Edwards	10 – Ross	Firestone Fieldhouse (1,015); Malibu, CA
February 14, 2019; 7:00 pm		at San Francisco	L 77–89	12–14 (5–7)	21 – Ross	7 – Edwards	9 – Ross	War Memorial Gymnasium (1,836); San Francisco, CA
February 16, 2019; 8:00 pm, SPCSN		at Saint Mary's	L 65–72	12–15 (5–8)	22 – Ross	9 – Edwards	5 – Ross	McKeon Pavilion (3,500); Moraga, CA
February 21, 2019; 6:00 pm, RTNW		at No. 2 Gonzaga	L 64–92	12–16 (5–9)	16 – Dunn	7 – Dunn	8 – Ross	McCarthey Athletic Center (6,000); Spokane, WA
February 23, 2019; 5:00 pm		Portland	W 86–80	13–16 (6–9)	23 – Ross	11 – Edwards	10 – Ross	Firestone Fieldhouse (1,045); Malibu, CA
March 2, 2019; 5:00 pm		Pacific	L 72–73	13–17 (6–10)	36 – Ross	7 – Edwards	3 – Ross	Firestone Fieldhouse (1,157); Malibu, CA
WCC tournament
March 7, 2019; 10:00 pm, TheW.tv	(8)	vs. (9) Pacific; Opening round	W 61–53	14–17	15 – Polk Jr.	11 – Edwards	3 – Ross	Orleans Arena; Paradise, NV
March 8, 2019; 10:00 pm, TheW.tv	(8)	vs. (5) Loyola Marymount; Second round	W 68–65	15–17	20 – Ross	9 – Ohia Obioha	6 – Ross	Orleans Arena; Paradise, NV
March 9, 2019; 7:00 pm, ESPN2	(8)	vs. (4) San Francisco; Third round	W 89–72	16–17	26 – Ross	7 – Edwards	9 – Ross	Orleans Arena; Paradise, NV
March 11, 2019; 6:00 pm, ESPN	(8)	vs. (1) No. 1 Gonzaga; Semifinals	L 74–100	16–18	20 – Ross	9 – Smith	3 – Ross	Orleans Arena; Paradise, NV
*Non-conference game. ^{#}Rankings from AP Poll. (#) Tournament seedings in parentheses. All times are in Pacific Time.
