= 2018–19 Loyola Marymount Lions men's basketball team =

American college basketball season

2018–19 Loyola Marymount Lions men's basketball

CBI, Semifinals
- Conference: West Coast Conference
- Record: 22–12 (8–8 WCC)
- Head coach: Mike Dunlap (5th season)
- Assistant coaches: Derrick Clark; Patrick Sandle; Jeff Strohm
- Home arena: Gersten Pavilion

2018–19 West Coast Conference men's basketball standings
	Conf.				Overall
Team	W		L	PCT	W		L	PCT
No. 4 Gonzaga	16	–	0	1.000	33	–	4	.892
Saint Mary's †	11	–	5	.688	22	–	12	.647
BYU	11	–	5	.688	19	–	13	.594
San Francisco	9	–	7	.563	21	–	10	.677
Loyola Marymount	8	–	8	.500	22	–	12	.647
Santa Clara	8	–	8	.500	16	–	15	.516
San Diego	7	–	9	.438	21	–	15	.583
Pepperdine	6	–	10	.375	16	–	18	.471
Pacific	4	–	12	.250	14	–	18	.438
Portland	0	–	16	.000	7	–	25	.219
† 2019 WCC tournament winner Rankings from AP Poll

The 2018–19 Loyola Marymount Lions men's basketball team represented Loyola Marymount University during the 2018–19 NCAA Division I men's basketball season. The Lions are led by fifth-year head coach Mike Dunlap. They played their home games at Gersten Pavilion in Los Angeles, California as members of the West Coast Conference. They finished the season 22–12, 8–8 in WCC Play to tie for 5th place. They lost in the second round of the WCC tournament to Pepperdine. They received an at-large bid to the College Basketball Invitational, where they defeated California Baptist and Brown to advance to the semifinals. They then lost to South Florida.

== Previous season ==
The Lions finished the 2017–18 season finished the season 11–20, 5–13 in WCC play to finish in eighth place. They defeated Portland in the first round of the WCC tournament before losing in the quarterfinals to Gonzaga.

== Offseason ==
=== Departures ===
Name	Number	Pos.	Height	Weight	Year	Hometown	Reason for departure
Steven Haney	12	G/F	6'6"	197	RS Senior	Fort Lauderdale, FL	Graduated
Mikail Simmons	13	F	6'8"	212	Freshman	Plano, TX	Transferred to Bossier Parish CC
Dylan Causwell	22	F	6'7"	197	Junior	Johns Creek, GA	Graduate transferred to Southeastern
Liam Eberhardt	34	F	6'7"	190	Freshman	Seattle, WA	Walk-on; didn't return

=== Incoming transfers ===
Name	Number	Pos.	Height	Weight	Year	Hometown	Notes
Jordan Bell	23	G/F	6'8"	225	RS Sophomore	Inglewood, CA	Junior college transferred from Compton College.

=== 2018 recruiting class ===
College recruiting information
Name	Hometown	School	Height	Weight	Commit date
Dameane Douglas; SF	Fresno, CA	San Joaquin Memorial High School	6 ft 6 in (1.98 m)	N/A	Aug 7, 2017
Dameane Douglas; SF	Recruit ratings: Scout: Rivals: (0)				
Ivan Alipiev; SF	Bulgaria	BC Levski Sofia	6 ft 7 in (2.01 m)	N/A	Mar 30, 2018
Ivan Alipiev; SF	Recruit ratings: Scout: Rivals: (0)				
Overall recruit ranking: Scout: nr Rivals: nr ESPN: nr
Note: In many cases, Scout, Rivals, 247Sports, On3, and ESPN may conflict in their listings of height and weight.; In these cases, the average was taken. ESPN grades are on a 100-point scale.; Sources: "Loyola Marymount Lions 2018 Basketball Commitments". Rivals.; "2018 Loyola Marymount Lions Basketball Commits". Scout.; "ESPN 2018 Loyola Marymount Lions Basketball recruits". ESPN.; "Scout.com Team Recruiting Rankings". Scout.; "2018 Team Ranking". Rivals.

== Roster ==
2018–19 Loyola Marymount Lions men's basketball team
Players
Coaches

Pos.	#	Name	Height	Weight	Year	Previous school	Hometown
F	0	Eli Scott	6 ft 5 in (1.96 m)	243 lb (110 kg)	So	Chino Hills HS	Chino Hills, CA
F	1	Zafir Williams	6 ft 6 in (1.98 m)	241 lb (109 kg)	So	Long Beach Poly	Long Beach, CA
G	2	Donald Gipson	6 ft 3 in (1.91 m)	213 lb (97 kg)	RS So	Fairfax HS	Los Angeles, CA
G	3	Cameron Allen	6 ft 2 in (1.88 m)	176 lb (80 kg)	Jr	Forest Trail Academy; Pensacola State College	Greenville, SC
G	5	James Batemon III	6 ft 1 in (1.85 m)	189 lb (86 kg)	Sr	University HS; North Dakota State College of Science	Milwaukee, WI
F	11	Petr Herman	6 ft 10 in (2.08 m)	231 lb (105 kg)	RS Sr	Canarias Academy	Central Bohemian Region, Czech Republic
G/F	13	Dameane Douglas	6 ft 7 in (2.01 m)	195 lb (88 kg)	Fr	San Joaquin Memorial	Hanford, CA
C	14	Mattias Markusson	7 ft 3 in (2.21 m)	261 lb (118 kg)	Jr	Kfum Jämtland BBK	Vasterled, Stockholm, Sweden
G	15	Joe Quintana	6 ft 2 in (1.88 m)	170 lb (77 kg)	So	Bonita HS	West Covina, CA
G	20	Erik Johansson (W)	6 ft 6 in (1.98 m)	186 lb (84 kg)	Jr	Täljegymnasiet	Södertälje, Sweden
F	23	Jordan Bell	6 ft 8 in (2.03 m)	221 lb (100 kg)	RS So	Inglewood; Compton College	Inglewood, CA
G	25	Jeffery McClendon	6 ft 2 in (1.88 m)	216 lb (98 kg)	Sr	Eastside HS	Lancaster, CA
F	35	Ivan Alipiev	6 ft 7 in (2.01 m)	200 lb (91 kg)	Fr	Lycée Alphonse de Lamartine	Sofia, Bulgaria

Head coach

- Mike Dunlap (Loyola Marymount)

Assistant coach(es)

- Patrick Sandle (San Francisco State)
- Derrick Clark (Cal Lutheran)
- Jeff Strohm (Eastern Illinois)

Legend

- (C) Team captain
- (S) Suspended
- (I) Ineligible
- (W) Walk-on
- Injured
- Current redshirt

Roster

== Schedule and results ==
Date time, TV	Rank^{#}	Opponent^{#}	Result	Record	Site (attendance) city, state
Non-conference regular season
November 6, 2018*; 5:00 pm		Westcliff University	W 75–43	1–0	Gersten Pavilion (1,106); Los Angeles, CA
November 10, 2018*; 7:00 pm, ATTSNRM		at UNLV	W 61–50	2–0	Thomas & Mack Center (8,501); Paradise, NV
November 13, 2018*; 6:00 pm		Cal State Northridge	W 79–64	3–0	Gersten Pavilion (862); Los Angeles, CA
November 16, 2018*; 5:00 pm, CBSSN		vs. Georgetown; Jamaica Classic	W 65–52	4–0	Montego Bay Convention Centre (1,169); Montego Bay, Jamaica
November 18, 2018*; 4:30 pm, CBSSN		vs. Ohio; Jamaica Classic	W 65–56	5–0	Montego Bay Convention Centre; Montego Bay, Jamaica
November 21, 2018*; 7:00 pm		Central Connecticut; Jamaica Classic	W 76–74	6–0	Gersten Pavilion (644); Los Angeles, CA
November 24, 2018*; 7:30 pm		Florida A&M; Jamaica Classic	W 71–63	7–0	Gersten Pavilion (685); Los Angeles, CA
November 29, 2018*; 7:00 pm		Bethesda	W 106–50	8–0	Gersten Pavilion (980); Los Angeles, CA
December 2, 2018*; 7:00 pm, P12N		at UCLA	L 58–82	8–1	Pauley Pavilion (8,242); Los Angeles, CA
December 5, 2018*; 7:00 pm		at Cal State Fullerton	W 59–49	9–1	Titan Gym (1,024); Fullerton, CA
December 15, 2018*; 7:05 pm		at Portland State	W 85–58	10–1	Viking Pavilion (1,055); Portland, OR
December 19, 2018*; 7:00 pm		Boise State	W 70–69	11–1	Gersten Pavilion (1,279); Los Angeles, CA
December 22, 2018*; 7:00 pm		at UC Riverside	L 53–60	11–2	SRC Arena (339); Riverside, CA
December 28, 2018*; 7:00 pm		UC Davis	W 77–59	12–2	Gersten Pavilion (926); Los Angeles, CA
WCC regular season
January 3, 2019; 7:00 pm, SPCSN		at Pepperdine	L 62–77	12–3 (0–1)	Firestone Fieldhouse (1,118); Malibu, CA
January 5, 2019; 3:00 pm		Portland	W 76–64	13–3 (1–1)	Gersten Pavilion (815); Los Angeles, CA
January 5, 2019; 7:00 pm, SPCSN		Saint Mary's	L 60–71	13–4 (1–2)	Gersten Pavilion (1,703); Los Angeles, CA
January 17, 2019; 6:00 pm, RTNW		at No. 5 Gonzaga	L 55–73	13–5 (1–3)	McCarthey Athletic Center (6,000); Spokane, WA
January 19, 2019; 1:00 pm, SPCSN		Pepperdine	W 74–70	14–5 (2–3)	Gersten Pavilion (1,646); Los Angeles, CA
January 24, 2019; 7:00 pm		at San Diego	L 58–71	14–6 (2–4)	Jenny Craig Pavilion (1,519); San Diego, CA
January 26, 2019; 6:00 pm		at Santa Clara	W 69–61	15–6 (3–4)	Leavey Center (2,133); Santa Clara, CA
January 31, 2019; 7:30 pm		Pacific	W 60–42	16–6 (4–4)	Gersten Pavilion (861); Los Angeles, CA
February 2, 2019; 6:00 pm, BYUtv		at BYU	L 49–67	16–7 (4–5)	Marriott Center (11,643); Provo, UT
February 7, 2019; 7:00 pm		San Diego	L 63–65	16–8 (4–6)	Gersten Pavilion (989); Los Angeles, CA
February 9, 2019; 7:00 pm		at Portland	W 72–55	17–8 (5–6)	Chiles Center (1,927); Portland, OR
February 14, 2019; 8:00 pm, ESPN2		No. 3 Gonzaga	L 60–73	17–9 (5–7)	Gersten Pavilion (4,213); Los Angeles, CA
February 16, 2019; 1:00 pm, SPCSN		BYU	L 62–70	17–10 (5–8)	Gersten Pavilion (3,692); Los Angeles, CA
February 23, 2019; 12:30 pm, SPCSN		Pacific	W 63–56	18–10 (6–8)	Alex G. Spanos Center (2,066); Stockton, CA
February 28, 2019; 8:00 pm, SPCSN		Santa Clara	W 72–70	19–10 (7–8)	Gersten Pavilion (1,150); Los Angeles, CA
March 2, 2019; 1:00 pm, SPCSN		at San Francisco	W 74–69	20–10 (8–8)	War Memorial Gymnasium (3,005); San Francisco, CA
WCC tournament
March 8, 2019; 10:00 pm, SPCSN	(5)	vs. (8) Pepperdine; Second round	L 65–68	20–11	Orleans Arena (1,482); Paradise, NV
College Basketball Invitational
March 20, 2019*; 7:00 pm, WAC DN		at California Baptist; First round	W 56–55	21–11	CBU Events Center (2,346); Riverside, CA
March 25, 2019*; 7:00 pm, TheW.tv		Brown; Quarterfinals	W 81–63	22–11	Gersten Pavilion (657); Los Angeles, CA
March 28, 2019*; 4:00 pm		at South Florida; Semifinals	L 47–56	22–12	Yuengling Center (1,658); Tampa, FL
*Non-conference game. ^{#}Rankings from AP Poll. (#) Tournament seedings in parentheses.
