= 2018–19 West Coast Conference men's basketball season =

- League: NCAA Division I
- Sport: Men's basketball
- Teams: 10

Regular season
- Season champions: Gonzaga
- Season MVP: Rui Hachimura, Gonzaga

Tournament
- Champions: Saint Mary's
- Runners-up: Gonzaga
- Finals MVP: Jordan Hunter - Saint Mary's

Basketball seasons
- ← 2017–18 2019–20 →

2018–19 West Coast Conference men's basketball standings
	Conf.				Overall
Team	W		L	PCT	W		L	PCT
No. 4 Gonzaga	16	–	0	1.000	33	–	4	.892
Saint Mary's †	11	–	5	.688	22	–	12	.647
BYU	11	–	5	.688	19	–	13	.594
San Francisco	9	–	7	.563	21	–	10	.677
Loyola Marymount	8	–	8	.500	22	–	12	.647
Santa Clara	8	–	8	.500	16	–	15	.516
San Diego	7	–	9	.438	21	–	15	.583
Pepperdine	6	–	10	.375	16	–	18	.471
Pacific	4	–	12	.250	14	–	18	.438
Portland	0	–	16	.000	7	–	25	.219
† 2019 WCC tournament winner Rankings from AP Poll

The 2018–19 West Coast Conference men's basketball season began with practices in September 2018 and will end with the 2019 West Coast Conference men's basketball tournament March 2019. This is the 68th season for WCC men's basketball, and the 30th under its current name of "West Coast Conference". The conference was founded in 1952 as the California Basketball Association, became the West Coast Athletic Conference in 1956, and dropped the word "Athletic" in 1989.

== Head coaches ==
=== Coaching changes ===
On February 13, 2018, Pepperdine announced that head coach Marty Wilson would not return following the end of the season. He finished at Pepperdine with a seven-year record of 88–129 (91–139 when including his 3–10 record as interim head coach in 1995–96). On March 12, the school hired Lorenzo Romar as head coach. Romar returned to Pepperdine where he started his coaching career in 1996.

On March 8, 2018, San Diego head coach Lamont Smith, who had been placed on administrative leave following an arrest for domestic violence 10 days earlier, resigned as head coach. Assistant coach Sam Scholl took over as interim head coach for the Toreros during the WCC Tournament and the CIT. On April 2, the school announced Scholl would remain the head coach.

=== Coaches ===
Team	Head coach	Previous job	Years at school	Overall record	WCC record	WCC Tournament record	NCAA Tournaments	Sweet Sixteens
BYU	Dave Rose	Dixie State	14	329–122 (.729)	84–38 (.689)	9–7 (.563)	8	1
Gonzaga	Mark Few	Gonzaga (asst.)	20	535–118 (.819)	260–30 (.897)	42–4 (.913)	19	8
Loyola Marymount	Mike Dunlap	Charlotte Bobcats	5	48–75 (.390)	23–49 (.319)	2–4 (.333)	0	0
Pacific	Damon Stoudamire	Memphis Grizzlies (asst.)	3	25–40 (.385)	13–23 (.361)	1–2 (.333)	0	0
Pepperdine	Lorenzo Romar	Arizona (asst.)	1	42–44 (.488)	22–20 (.524)	1–3 (.250)	7	3
Portland	Terry Porter	Minnesota Timberwolves (asst.)	3	21–44 (.323)	6–30 (.167)	1–2 (.333)	0	0
Saint Mary's	Randy Bennett	Saint Louis (asst.)	18	392–162 (.708)	188–74 (.718)	20–15 (.571)	6	1
San Diego	Sam Scholl	San Diego (asst.)	1	2–1 (.667)	0–0 (–)	0–0 (–)	0	0
San Francisco	Kyle Smith	Columbia	3	42–30 (.583)	19–17 (.528)	1–2 (.333)	0	0
Santa Clara	Herb Sendek	Arizona State	3	28–36 (.438)	18–18 (.500)	1–2 (.333)	8	1

Notes:

- Year at school includes 2018–19 season.
- Overall and WCC records are from time at current school and are through the beginning of the 2018–19 season.

== Preseason ==
=== Preseason poll ===
Rank	Team
1.	Gonzaga (9)
2.	Saint Mary's
3.	BYU (1)
4.	San Francisco
5.	San Diego
6.	Pacific
7.	Loyola Marymount
8.	Pepperdine
9.	Santa Clara
10.	Portland
(first place votes)

=== All-WCC Preseason Men's Basketball team ===
Honor	Recipient
Preseason All-WCC Team
Preseason All-WCC Team	James Batemon, Loyola Marymount
Preseason All-WCC Team	Yoeli Childs, BYU
Preseason All-WCC Team	KJ Feagin, Santa Clara
Preseason All-WCC Team	Frankie Ferrari, San Francisco
Preseason All-WCC Team	Jordan Ford, Saint Mary's
Preseason All-WCC Team	Rui Hachimura, Gonzaga
Preseason All-WCC Team	Zach Norvell Jr., Gonzaga
Preseason All-WCC Team	Josh Perkins, Gonzaga
Preseason All-WCC Team	Isaiah Piñeiro, San Diego
Preseason All-WCC Team	Killian Tillie, Gonzaga

== Rankings ==
Legend
	Improvement in ranking
	Drop in ranking
	Not ranked previous week
RV	Received votes but were not ranked in Top 25 of poll
(Italics)	Number of first place votes

		Pre/ Wk 1	Wk 2	Wk 3	Wk 4	Wk 5	Wk 6	Wk 7	Wk 8	Wk 9	Wk 10	Wk 11	Wk 12	Wk 13	Wk 14	Wk 15	Wk 16	Wk 17	Wk 18	Wk 19	Post
BYU	AP																				
BYU	C																				
Gonzaga	AP	3 (1)	3	3	1 (32)	1 (43)	4 (1)	8	7	7	5	5	4	4	4	3	2 (6)	1 (44)	1 (42)	1 (41)	4 (1)
Gonzaga	C	4 (1)	4 (1)	3	1 (17)	1 (21)	6 (1)	9	8	8	6	5	4	4	4	3	2 (4)	1 (26)	1 (27)	1 (28)	3 (3)
Loyola Marymount	AP			RV																	
Loyola Marymount	C																				
Pacific	AP																				
Pacific	C																				
Pepperdine	AP																				
Pepperdine	C																				
Portland	AP																				
Portland	C																				
Saint Mary's	AP																				
Saint Mary's	C			RV																	
San Diego	AP																				
San Diego	C																				
San Francisco	AP						RV	RV	RV				RV								
San Francisco	C								RV												
Santa Clara	AP																				
Santa Clara	C																				

== WCC regular season ==
=== Conference matrix ===
This table summarizes the head-to-head results between teams in conference play.

	BYU	Gonzaga	LMU	Pacific	Pepperdine	Portland	Saint Mary's	San Diego	San Francisco	Santa Clara
vs. Brigham Young	–	2–0	0–2	0–2	0–1	0–2	1–1	0–2	2–0	0–1
vs. Gonzaga	0–2	–	0–2	0–2	0–1	0–1	0–2	0–2	0–2	0–2
vs. Loyola Marymount	2–0	2–0	–	0–2	1–1	0–2	1–0	2–0	0–1	0–2
vs. Pacific	2–0	2–0	2–0	–	0–2	0–2	2–0	1–0	1–0	2–0
vs. Pepperdine	1–0	1–0	1–1	2–0	–	0–2	1–1	0–2	2–0	2–0
vs. Portland	2–0	1–0	2–0	2–0	2–0	–	1–0	2–0	2–0	2–0
vs. Saint Mary's	1–1	2–0	0–1	0–2	1–1	0–1	–	0–2	1–1	0–2
vs. San Diego	2–0	2–0	0–2	0–1	2–0	0–2	2–0	–	0–2	1–0
vs. San Francisco	0–2	2–0	1–0	0–1	0–2	0–2	1–1	2–0	–	1–1
vs. Santa Clara	1–0	2–0	2–0	0–2	0–2	0–2	2–0	0–1	1–1	–
Total	11–5	16–0	8–8	4–12	6–10	0–16	11–5	7–9	9–7	8–8

== All-WCC awards and teams ==
Honor	Recipient
All-WCC First Team
All-WCC First Team	James Batemon, Loyola Marymount
All-WCC First Team	Yoeli Childs, BYU
All-WCC First Team	Brandon Clarke, Gonzaga
All-WCC First Team	Frankie Ferrari, San Francisco
All-WCC First Team	Jordan Ford, Saint Mary's
All-WCC First Team	Rui Hachimura, Gonzaga
All-WCC First Team	Zach Norvell Jr., Gonzaga
All-WCC First Team	Josh Perkins, Gonzaga
All-WCC First Team	Isaiah Piñeiro, San Diego
All-WCC First Team	Colbey Ross, Pepperdine

Honor	Recipient
All-WCC Second Team
All-WCC Second Team	Tahj Eaddy, Santa Clara
All-WCC Second Team	Malik Fitts, Saint Mary's
All-WCC Second Team	T.J. Haws, BYU
All-WCC Second Team	Charles Minlend, San Francisco
All-WCC Second Team	Olin Carter III, San Diego

Honor	Recipient
All-WCC Freshman Team
All-WCC Freshman Team	Gavin Baxter, BYU
All-WCC Freshman Team	Dameane Douglas, Loyola Marymount
All-WCC Freshman Team	Kessler Edwards, Pepperdine
All-WCC Freshman Team	Filip Petrušev, Gonzaga
All-WCC Freshman Team	Trey Wertz, Santa Clara

== See also ==
- 2018–19 NCAA Division I men's basketball season
- West Coast Conference men's basketball tournament
- 2018–19 West Coast Conference women's basketball season
- West Coast Conference women's basketball tournament
- 2019 West Coast Conference women's basketball tournament
