= 2018–19 Hawaii Rainbow Warriors basketball team =

2018–19 Hawaii Rainbow Warriors basketball

Rainbow Classic runner-up
- Conference: Big West Conference
- Record: 18–13 (9–7 Big West)
- Head coach: Eran Ganot (4th season)
- Assistant coaches: Adam Jacobsen; John Montgomery; Jabari Trotter
- Captain: Brocke Stepteau
- Home arena: Stan Sheriff Center

2018–19 Big West men's basketball standings
	Conf.				Overall
Team	W		L	PCT	W		L	PCT
UC Irvine †	15	–	1	.938	31	–	6	.838
UC Santa Barbara	10	–	6	.625	22	–	10	.688
Cal State Fullerton	10	–	6	.625	16	–	18	.471
Hawai'i	9	–	7	.563	18	–	13	.581
Long Beach State	8	–	8	.500	15	–	19	.441
UC Davis	7	–	9	.438	11	–	20	.355
Cal State Northridge	7	–	9	.438	13	–	21	.382
UC Riverside	4	–	12	.250	10	–	23	.303
Cal Poly	2	–	14	.125	6	–	23	.207
† 2019 Big West tournament winner

The 2018–19 Hawaii Rainbow Warriors basketball team represented the University of Hawaiʻi at Mānoa during the 2018–19 NCAA Division I men's basketball season. The Rainbow Warriors, led by fourth-year head coach Eran Ganot, played their home games at the Stan Sheriff Center in Honolulu, Hawaii. Hawaii was a member of the Big West Conference, and participated in their 7th season in that league. They finished the season 18-13, 9-7 in Big West play. They placed fourth in the conference, losing to Long Beach State in the quarterfinals of the Big West tournament. It was the second straight year Hawaii blew a double digit lead in the tournament en route to being eliminated in the quarterfinals for the third straight year. Despite being eligible, citing health and season length, the team declined an invitation to the CIT for the second consecutive year.

== Previous season ==
The Rainbow Warriors finished the 2017–18 season 17–13, 8–8 in Big West play to finish in sixth place. As the No. 6 seed in the Big West tournament, they were defeated by UC Irvine in the quarterfinals.

== Departures ==
Name	Number	Pos.	Height	Weight	Year	Hometown	Reason for departure
Jaaron Stallworth	5	G	6'1"	180	Sophomore	Elk Grove, CA	Departed Program
Mike Thomas	13	G	6'7"	225	Senior	Woodland Hills, California	Graduated
Ido Flaisher	15	C	6'10"	235	Sophomore	Herzliya, Israel	Departed Program
Gibson Johnson	21	F	6'8"	220	Senior	Centerville, Utah	Graduated
Zach Buscher	24	G	6'3"	180	Junior	Kailua, Hawaii	Graduated
Trevor LaCount	35	F	6'7"	185	Junior	Ventura, California	Departed Program

=== Incoming transfers ===
Name	Number	Pos.	Height	Weight	Year	Hometown	Notes
Eddie Stansberry	3	G	6'3"	190	Junior	San Francisco, CA	Junior college transferred from City College of San Francisco
Hutifah Abdeljawad	24	G	6'0"	160	Sophomore	Honolulu, Hawaii	Transferred from San Diego Mesa College

== 2018 Commitments ==
College recruiting information
Name	Hometown	School	Height	Weight	Commit date
Dawson Carper; C	Colorado Springs, Colorado	Rampart High School	7 ft 0 in (2.13 m)	250 lb (110 kg)	Oct 20, 2017
Dawson Carper; C	Recruit ratings: Scout: Rivals: 247Sports: ESPN:				
Zoar Nedd; SF	Kapolei, Hawaii	Kapolei High School	6 ft 5 in (1.96 m)	210 lb (95 kg)	Jul 3, 2018
Zoar Nedd; SF	Recruit ratings: Scout: Rivals: 247Sports: ESPN:				
Owen Hulland; PF	Adelaide, Australia	UCSSC Lake Ginninderra	7 ft 0 in (2.13 m)	230 lb (100 kg)	Oct 18, 2017
Owen Hulland; PF	Recruit ratings: Scout: Rivals: 247Sports: ESPN:				
Overall recruit ranking:
Note: In many cases, Scout, Rivals, 247Sports, On3, and ESPN may conflict in their listings of height and weight.; In these cases, the average was taken. ESPN grades are on a 100-point scale.; Sources: "2018 Team Ranking". Rivals.

== Roster ==
2018–19 Hawaii Rainbow Warriors men's basketball team
Players
Coaches

Pos.	#	Name	Height	Weight	Year	Previous school	Hometown
G	0	Leland Green	6 ft 2 in (1.88 m)	185 lb (84 kg)	Jr	Redondo Union HS	Los Angeles, California
G	1	Drew Buggs	6 ft 3 in (1.91 m)	195 lb (88 kg)	RS So	Long Beach Poly HS	Long Beach, California
G	2	Brocke Stepteau (C)	5 ft 9 in (1.75 m)	170 lb (77 kg)	Sr	Dallas Jesuit Prep School	Dallas, Texas
G	3	Eddie Stansberry	6 ft 3 in (1.91 m)	190 lb (86 kg)	Jr	Archbishop Riordan HS; City College of San Francisco	San Francisco, CA
G	4	Brandon Thomas	6 ft 4 in (1.93 m)	175 lb (79 kg)	So	Taft HS; Riverside City College	Tarzana, California
C	11	Mate Colina (redshirt)	7 ft 0 in (2.13 m)	240 lb (109 kg)	Fr	Lake Ginninderra HS	Melbourne, Australia
F	12	Jack Purchase	6 ft 9 in (2.06 m)	210 lb (95 kg)	Sr	Carey Grammar; Auburn	Melbourne, Australia
F	14	Zigmars Raimo	6 ft 7 in (2.01 m)	235 lb (107 kg)	Jr	Riga Secondary School No. 49	Madona, Latvia
C	15	Owen Hulland	7 ft 0 in (2.13 m)	230 lb (104 kg)	Fr	Lake Ginninderra HS	Adelaide, Australia
F	20	Zoar Nedd (W)	6 ft 5 in (1.96 m)	210 lb (95 kg)	Fr	Kapolei HS	Kapolei, Hawaii
G	23	Sheriff Drammeh	6 ft 3 in (1.91 m)	160 lb (73 kg)	Sr	Igelstavikens Gymnasium	Stockholm, Sweden
G	24	Hutifah Abdeljawad (redshirt)	6 ft 0 in (1.83 m)	160 lb (73 kg)	So	McKinley HS; San Diego Mesa College	Honolulu, Hawaii
G/F	32	Samuta Avea	6 ft 6 in (1.98 m)	195 lb (88 kg)	So	Kahuku HS	Hauʻula, Hawaii
G/F	42	Justin Hemsley	6 ft 5 in (1.96 m)	185 lb (84 kg)	RS Fr	Damien HS	Rancho Cucamonga, California
C	44	Dawson Carper	7 ft 0 in (2.13 m)	250 lb (113 kg)	Fr	Rampart HS	Colorado Springs, Colorado

Head coach

- Eran Ganot (Swarthmore College)

Assistant coach(es)

- Adam Jacobsen (Pacific)
- John Montgomery (Loyola Marymount)
- Jabari Trotter (Dartmouth)

Legend

- (C) Team captain
- (S) Suspended
- (I) Ineligible
- (W) Walk-on
- Injured
- Current redshirt

Roster
Last update: November 20, 2018

== Schedule and results ==
Date time, TV	Rank^{#}	Opponent^{#}	Result	Record	Site (attendance) city, state
Exhibition
November 2, 2018*; 7:00 pm		Hawaii Pacific	W 81–45		Stan Sheriff Center (4,771); Honolulu, HI
Non-conference regular season
November 9, 2018*; 7:00 pm, Spectrum Sports		Portland; Outrigger Resorts Rainbow Classic	W 82–64	1–0	Stan Sheriff Center (5,401); Honolulu, HI
November 10, 2018*; 7:00 pm, Spectrum Sports		Humboldt State; Outrigger Resorts Rainbow Classic	W 90–54	2–0	Stan Sheriff Center (5,111); Honolulu, HI
November 11, 2018*; 6:00 pm, Spectrum Sports		North Texas; Outrigger Resorts Rainbow Classic	L 51–68	2–1	Stan Sheriff Center (5,037); Honolulu, HI
November 18, 2018*; 5:00 pm, Spectrum Sports		Northern Arizona	W 85–68	3–1	Stan Sheriff Center (5,553); Honolulu, HI
November 22, 2018*; 6:30 pm, ESPN2		vs. Utah; Wooden Legacy	W 90–79	4–1	Titan Gym (2,132); Fullerton, CA
November 23, 2018*; 5:30 pm, ESPN2		vs. Seton Hall; Wooden Legacy	L 54–64	4–2	Titan Gym (2,089); Fullerton, CA
November 25, 2018*; 11:00 am, ESPNU		vs. Fresno State; Wooden Legacy	L 64–79	4–3	Titan Gym (n/a); Fullerton, CA
November 28, 2018*; 4:00pm, P12N		at UCLA	L 61–80	4–4	Pauley Pavilion (6,062); Los Angeles, CA
December 8, 2018*; 7:00 pm, Big West.TV		Hawaii–Hilo	W 82–75	5–4	Stan Sheriff Center (4,744); Honolulu, HI
December 16, 2018*; 5:00 pm, Spectrum Sports		Mississippi Valley State	W 76–51	6–4	Stan Sheriff Center (4,890); Honolulu, HI
December 22, 2018*; 12:00 pm, ESPNU		UNLV; Diamond Head Classic Quarterfinals	L 59–73	6–5	Stan Sheriff Center (6,049); Honolulu, HI
December 23, 2018*; 2:00 pm, ESPNU		Colorado; Diamond Head Classic consolation round	W 70–62 ^{OT}	7–5	Stan Sheriff Center (5,470); Honolulu, HI
December 25, 2018*; 10:00 am, ESPNU		Rhode Island; Diamond Head Classic 5th Place Game	W 68–60	8–5	Stan Sheriff Center (5,696); Honolulu, HI
December 29, 2018*; 7:00 pm, Spectrum Sports		Alabama A&M	W 71–63	9–5	Stan Sheriff Center (5,043); Honolulu, HI
Big West regular season
January 9, 2019; 7:00 pm, Spectrum Sports		Cal State Fullerton	W 79–68	10–5 (1–0)	Stan Sheriff Center (4,971); Honolulu, HI
January 17, 2019; 5:00 pm, ESPN3		at Cal State Northridge	W 84–79	11–5 (2–0)	Matadome (815); Northridge, CA
January 19, 2019; 3:00 pm, ESPN3		at UC Riverside	L 71–75	11–6 (2–1)	SRC Arena (453); Riverside, CA
January 23, 2019; 7:00 pm, Spectrum Sports		UC Irvine	L 74–75	11–7 (2–2)	Stan Sheriff Center (5,602); Honolulu, HI
January 26, 2019; 7:00 pm, Spectrum Sports		UC Davis	W 80–60	12–7 (3–2)	Stan Sheriff Center (6,265); Honolulu, HI
January 31, 2018; 7:00 pm, Spectrum Sports		Long Beach State	W 74–57	13–7 (4–2)	Stan Sheriff Center (5,293); Honolulu, HI
February 2, 2019; 8:00 pm		UC Santa Barbara	L 54–75	13–8 (4–3)	Stan Sheriff Center (6,060); Honolulu, HI
February 7, 2019; 5:00 pm, ESPN3		at Long Beach State	W 77–70	14–8 (5–3)	Walter Pyramid (2,177); Long Beach, CA
February 9, 2019; 5:00pm, ESPN3		at UC Irvine	L 56–67	14–9 (5–4)	Bren Events Center (1,483); Irvine, CA
February 14, 2019; 7:00 pm, Spectrum Sports		Cal Poly	W 75–54	15–9 (6–4)	Stan Sheriff Center (4,995); Honolulu, HI
February 16, 2019; 8:00 pm, Spectrum Sports		UC Riverside	W 87–64	16–9 (7–4)	Stan Sheriff Center (6,636); Honolulu, HI
February 21, 2019; 5:00 pm, ESPNU		at UC Santa Barbara	L 61–79	16–11 (7–5)	The Thunderdome (1,877); Santa Barbara, CA
February 23, 2019; 5:00 pm, Big West.TV		at Cal Poly	W 88–80	16–11 (7–6)	Mott Gym (2,310); San Luis Obispo, CA
March 2, 2019; 8:00 pm, Spectrum Sports		Cal State Northridge	L 73–84	16–12 (7–7)	Stan Sheriff Center (6,673); Honolulu, HI
March 7, 2019; 5:00 pm		at UC Davis	W 76–69	17–12 (8–7)	The Pavilion (1,721); Davis, CA
March 9, 2019; 4:00 pm, ESPN3		at Cal State Fullerton	W 71–59	18–12 (9–7)	Titan Gym (1,369); Fullerton, CA
Big West tournament
March 14, 2019; 5:30pm, ESPN3	(4)	vs. (5) Long Beach State; Quarterfinals	L 66–68	18–13	Honda Center (3,656); Anaheim, CA
*Non-conference game. ^{#}Rankings from AP Poll. (#) Tournament seedings in parentheses. All times are in Hawaii–Aleutian Time..

== See also ==
- 2018–19 Hawaii Rainbow Wahine basketball team
