= 2018–19 UC Davis Aggies men's basketball team =

American college basketball season

2018–19 UC Davis Aggies men's basketball
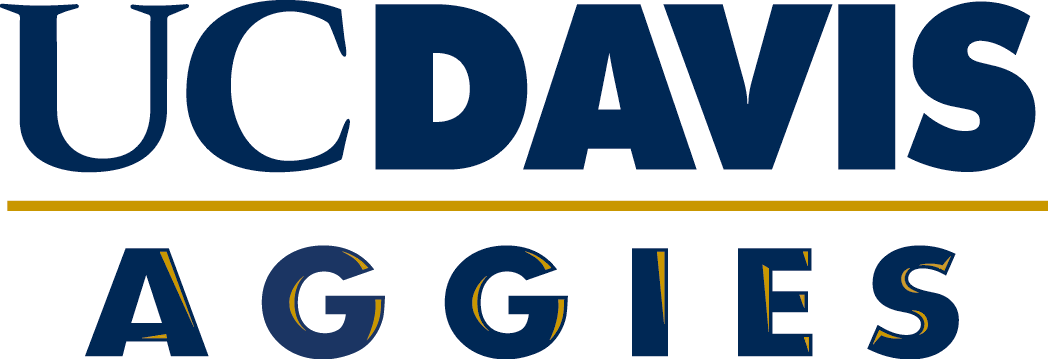
- Conference: Big West Conference
- Record: 11–20 (7–9 Big West)
- Head coach: Jim Les (8th season)
- Home arena: The Pavilion (Capacity: 5,931)

2018–19 Big West men's basketball standings
	Conf.				Overall
Team	W		L	PCT	W		L	PCT
UC Irvine †	15	–	1	.938	31	–	6	.838
UC Santa Barbara	10	–	6	.625	22	–	10	.688
Cal State Fullerton	10	–	6	.625	16	–	18	.471
Hawai'i	9	–	7	.563	18	–	13	.581
Long Beach State	8	–	8	.500	15	–	19	.441
UC Davis	7	–	9	.438	11	–	20	.355
Cal State Northridge	7	–	9	.438	13	–	21	.382
UC Riverside	4	–	12	.250	10	–	23	.303
Cal Poly	2	–	14	.125	6	–	23	.207
† 2019 Big West tournament winner

The 2018–19 UC Davis Aggies men's basketball team represented the University of California, Davis in the 2018–19 NCAA Division I men's basketball season. The Aggies were led by eighth-year head coach Jim Les and competed at The Pavilion. UC Davis was a member of the Big West Conference, and participated in their 12th consecutive season in that league.

== Before the season ==
The Aggies finished 22–11 overall, and 12–4 in the conference. During the season, the Aggies participated in the Las Vegas Classic under the visitors division, which was held in San Francisco, California, Reno, Nevada, and Las Vegas, Nevada. The Aggies finished in 2nd place by defeating Lamar but losing to Radford. Prior to the tournament, UC Davis lost at San Francisco and at Nevada as friendly matches. UC Davis also defeated rival Sacramento State in the Sacramento Showcase in Sacramento, California. In the postseason, UC Davis defeated UC Riverside but lost to Cal State Fullerton in the semifinals of the 2018 Big West Conference men's basketball tournament in Anaheim, California. In addition, the Aggies participated in the 2018 National Invitation Tournament, where they lost to Utah in Salt Lake City, Utah in the first round.

== Roster ==
2018–19 UC Davis Aggies men's basketball team
Players
Coaches

Pos.	#	Name	Height	Weight	Year	Previous school	Hometown
G	0	T.J. Shorts	5 ft 9 in (1.75 m)	160 lb (73 kg)	Sr	Saddleback College	Tustin, California
G	1	Damion Squire	6 ft 0 in (1.83 m)	175 lb (79 kg)	Fr	Wasatch Academy	Montréal, Canada
G	2	Stefan González	6 ft 2 in (1.88 m)	195 lb (88 kg)	Jr	Saint Mary's	Pocatello, Idaho
G	3	Giò Nelson (redshirt)	6 ft 4 in (1.93 m)	186 lb (84 kg)	RS Fr	Centennial High School	Corona, California
G	5	Siler Schneider	6 ft 3 in (1.91 m)	183 lb (83 kg)	Sr	Lansing High School	Lansing, Kansas
G	11	Caleb Fuller	6 ft 5 in (1.96 m)	210 lb (95 kg)	Fr	Barking Abbey School	Ipswich, England
C	13	Matt Neufeld	6 ft 11 in (2.11 m)	225 lb (102 kg)	Jr	Saint Louis	Victoria, Canada
G	20	B.J. Shaw	6 ft 6 in (1.98 m)	180 lb (82 kg)	Fr	Bishop O'Dowd High School	Oakland, California
F	21	Colin Russell	6 ft 10 in (2.08 m)	221 lb (100 kg)	Sr	Casper College	Folsom, California
G	22	Joe Mooney	6 ft 3 in (1.91 m)	187 lb (85 kg)	Jr	Notre Dame College Prep	Wauconda, Illinois
G	23	Rogers Printup	6 ft 4 in (1.93 m)	205 lb (93 kg)	Jr	Lutheran High School	Orange, California
G	24	Delveion Jackson	6 ft 6 in (1.98 m)	210 lb (95 kg)	So	Centennial High School	Boise, Idaho
F	25	A.J. John	6 ft 8 in (2.03 m)	225 lb (102 kg)	Sr	Pepperdine	Santa Rosa, California
G	30	Cameron Ba	6 ft 3 in (1.91 m)	175 lb (79 kg)	Fr	St. Joseph Notre Dame High School	Alameda, California
F	42	Jonah Underwood	6 ft 8 in (2.03 m)	220 lb (100 kg)	Jr	Willow Glen High School	San Jose, California
F	44	Garrison Goode	6 ft 7 in (2.01 m)	225 lb (102 kg)	Sr	Dominican High School	River Hills, Wisconsin

Head coach

- Jim Les (Bradley)

Assistant coach(es)

Legend

- (C) Team captain
- (S) Suspended
- (I) Ineligible
- (W) Walk-on
- Injured
- Current redshirt

Roster
Last update: 17 August 2018

== Schedule ==
Date time, TV	Rank^{#}	Opponent^{#}	Result	Record	High points	High rebounds	High assists	Site (attendance) city, state
Non–conference regular season
November 6, 2018*; 7:00 pm		San Francisco	L 42–76	0–1	8 – Tied	8 – González	3 – Tied	The Pavilion (1,891); Davis, CA
November 9, 2018*; 7:00 pm		San Diego	L 57–76	0–2	17 – Shorts II	9 – John	3 – Tied	The Pavilion (2,123); Davis, CA
November 12, 2018*; 5:00 pm		at Arkansas	L 58–81	0–3	14 – Shorts II	8 – Shorts II	4 – Tied	Bud Walton Arena (13,444); Fayetteville, AR
November 17, 2018*; 12:00 pm, ESPN+		at Texas A&M–CC	W 57-54	1-3	13 – Schneider	7 – Tied	5 – Shorts II	College Park Center (150); Arlington, TX
November 18, 2018*; 10:00 am		at UT Arlington	L 59-68	1-4	15 – Schneider	5 – Tied	5 – Shorts II	College Park Center (1,233); Arlington, TX
November 20, 2018*; 7:05 pm		vs. Sacramento State; Rivalry	L 55-58	1-5	15 – Schneider	6 – Tied	3 – Shorts II	Golden 1 Center (1,545); Sacramento, CA
November 23, 2018*; 4:00 pm, BTN Plus		at Indiana	L 62-76	1-6	16 – Shorts II	6 – Goode	7 – Shorts II	Assembly Hall (13,562); Bloomington, IN
November 29, 2018*; 7:00 pm		Northern Arizona	W 73-57	2-6	21 – Shorts II	6 – Tied	7 – Shorts II	The Pavilion (785); Davis, CA
December 5, 2018*; 5:00 pm, ESPN3		at Northern Illinois	L 62-71	2-7	18 – Shorts II	5 – Tied	7 – Schneider	Conovocation Center (910); DeKalb, IL
December 16, 2018*; 2:00 pm		William Jessup	W 83-65	3-7	17 – Tied	4 – Tied	7 – Squire	The Pavilion (989); Davis, CA
December 22, 2018*; 5:00 pm, P12N		at Arizona	L 68–70	3–8	25 – Shorts II	7 – Shorts II	5 – Schneider	McKale Center (13,576); Tucson, AZ
December 28, 2018*; 7:00 pm		at Loyola Marymount	L 59–77	3–9	19 – Schneider	5 – Neufeld	6 – Squire	Gersten Pavilion (9,261); Los Angeles, CA
December 30, 2018*; 6:00 pm, P12N		at USC	L 55–73	3–10	14 – Shorts	7 – Neufeld	5 – Goode	Galen Center (3,127); Los Angeles, CA
January 5, 2019*; 5:00 pm		Holy Names	W 90–60	4–10	18 – Schneider	6 – Gonzalez	3 – Shorts	The Pavilion (754); Davis, CA
Big West regular season
January 10, 2019; 7:00 pm, ESPN3		at UC Irvine	L 69–71 ^{OT}	4–11 (0–1)	21 – Shorts	10 – Shorts	2 – Shorts	Bren Events Center (1,680); Irvine, CA
January 12, 2019; 4:00 pm, ESPN3		at Long Beach State	L 77–82	4–12 (0–2)	29 – Mooney	6 – Fuller	5 – Shorts	Walter Pyramid (3,002); Long Beach, CA
January 17, 2019; 7:00 p.m.		UC Santa Barbara	L 58–69	4–13 (0–3)	14 – Mooney	5 – Shorts	3 – Goode	The Pavilion (3,189); Davis, CA
January 19, 2019; 5:00 p.m.		Cal Poly; Rivalry	W 75–63	5–13 (1–3)	23 – Schneider	9 – Neufeld	11 – Shorts	The Pavilion (2,090); Davis, CA
January 26, 2019; 9:00 p.m., Spectrum Sports HI		at Hawaii	L 60–80	5–14 (1–4)	17 – Neufeld	6 – Neufeld	8 – Shorts	Stan Sheriff Center (6,265); Honolulu, HI
February 2, 2019; 6:00 pm, ESPN3		at UC Riverside	W 84–71	6–14 (2–4)	23 – Shorts	6 – Gonzalez	6 – Printup	SRC Arena (350); Riverside, CA
February 7, 2019; 7:00 p.m.		at Cal Poly; Rivalry	W 63–53	7–14 (3–4)	18 – Shorts	6 – Neufeld	7 – Shorts	Mott Athletics Center (1,498); San Luis Obispo, CA
February 9, 2019; 9:00 pm, ESPNU		at UC Santa Barbara	W 61–57	8–14 (4–4)	21 – Shorts	5 – Gonzalez	3 – Shorts	The Thunderdome (2,316); Santa Barbara, CA
February 13, 2019; 7:00 p.m.		Cal State Northridge	W 76–59	9–14 (5–4)	21 – Mooney	9 – Shorts	6 – Shorts	The Pavilion (1,687); Davis, CA
February 16, 2019; 7:00 pm		Long Beach State	W 77–73	10–14 (6–4)	16 – Gonzalez	7 – Schneider	6 – Schneider	The Pavilion (1,882); Davis, CA
February 21, 2019; 7:00 pm		at Cal State Fullerton	L 58–62	10–15 (6–5)	27 – Schneider	9 – Mooney	4 – Gonzalez	Titan Gym (843); Fullerton, CA
February 23, 2019; 7:00 pm, ESPN3		at Cal State Northridge	L 76–81 ^{OT}	10–16 (6–6)	23 – Gonzalez	9 – Gonzalez	5 – Squire	Matadome (767); Los Angeles, CA
February 28, 2019; 7:00 pm, ESPNU		UC Irvine	L 48–64	10–17 (6–7)	10 – Neufeld	6 – Goode	2 – Shorts	The Pavilion (3,777); Davis, CA
March 2, 2019; 7:00 p.m.		Cal State Fullerton	W 66–59	11–17 (7–7)	18 – Shorts	8 – Shorts	5 – Shorts	The Pavilion (1,291); Davis, CA
March 7, 2019		Hawaii	L 69-76	11-18 (7-8)	26 – Shorts II	6 – Printup	4 – Shorts II	The Pavilion (1,271); Davis, CA
March 9, 2019; 7:00 p.m.		UC Riverside	L 70–71	11–19 (7–9)	19 – Mooney	7 – Schneider	6 – Mooney	The Pavilion (2,117); Davis, CA
Big West tournament
March 14, 2019; 2:30 pm, ESPN3	(6)	vs. (3) Cal State Fullerton; Quarterfinals	L 71–75 ^{OT}	11–20	28 – Shorts	7 – Neufeld	8 – Shorts	Honda Center (3,656); Anaheim, California
*Non-conference game. ^{#}Rankings from AP Poll. (#) Tournament seedings in parentheses. All times are in Pacific.
