= 2018–19 Cal State Northridge Matadors men's basketball team =

American college basketball season

2018–19 Cal State Northridge Matadors men's basketball
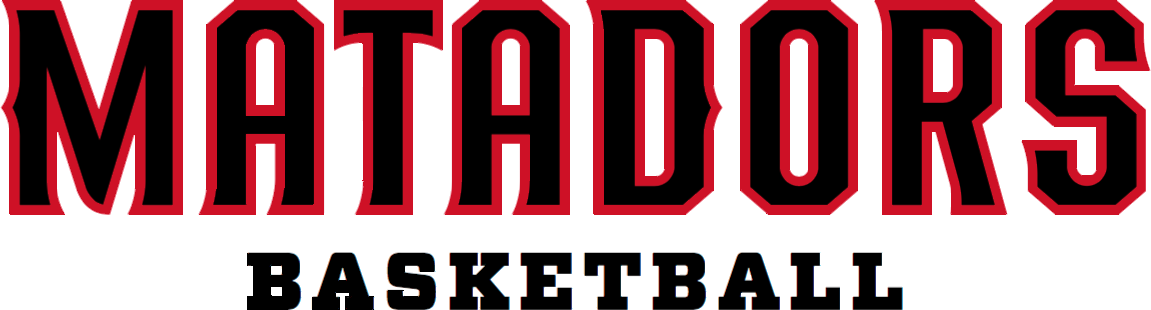

Las Vegas Classic Visitors Bracket champions

CBI, First round
- Conference: Big West Conference
- Record: 13–21 (7–9 Big West)
- Head coach: Mark Gottfried (1st season)
- Assistant coaches: Mo Williams (1st season); Jim Harrick (1st season); Jeff Dunlap (1st season)
- Home arena: Matadome (Capacity: 1,250)

2018–19 Big West men's basketball standings
| | Conf. | | | | Overall |
| Team | W | | L | PCT | W | | L | PCT |
|---|---|---|---|---|---|---|---|---|
| UC Irvine † | 15 | – | 1 | .938 | 31 | – | 6 | .838 |
| UC Santa Barbara | 10 | – | 6 | .625 | 22 | – | 10 | .688 |
| Cal State Fullerton | 10 | – | 6 | .625 | 16 | – | 18 | .471 |
| Hawai'i | 9 | – | 7 | .563 | 18 | – | 13 | .581 |
| Long Beach State | 8 | – | 8 | .500 | 15 | – | 19 | .441 |
| UC Davis | 7 | – | 9 | .438 | 11 | – | 20 | .355 |
| Cal State Northridge | 7 | – | 9 | .438 | 13 | – | 21 | .382 |
| UC Riverside | 4 | – | 12 | .250 | 10 | – | 23 | .303 |
| Cal Poly | 2 | – | 14 | .125 | 6 | – | 23 | .207 |
† 2019 Big West tournament winner

The 2018–19 Cal State Northridge Matadors men's basketball team represented California State University, Northridge in the 2018–19 NCAA Division I men's basketball season. The Matadors, led by first-year head coach Mark Gottfried, competed at the Matadome. CSU Northridge was a member of the Big West Conference, and participated in their 18th consecutive season in that league. They finished the season 13–21, 7–9 in Big West play to finish in a tie for sixth place. They lost in the quarterfinals of the Big West tournament to UC Santa Barbara. They were invited to the College Basketball Invitational where they lost in the first round to Utah Valley.

== Previous season ==
The Matadors finished 6–24 overall, and 3–13 in the conference. During the season, the Matadors participated in the Cancún Challenge under the Mayan division, which was held in Fresno, California, Fairfax, Virginia, and Cancún, Mexico. The Matadors finished in 4th place from losing to Southeast Missouri State and Binghamton. Prior to the tournament, CSU Northridge lost at Fresno State and at George Mason as friendly matches.

== Offseason ==
=== Departures ===
| Name | Number | Pos. | Height | Weight | Year | Hometown | Reason for departure |
|---|---|---|---|---|---|---|---|
| Jalon Pipkins | 0 | G | 6'4" | 180 | Freshman | Paris, TX | Pulled out of 2018 NBA draft did not return. |
| Michael Warren | 1 | G | 6'5" | 180 | Senior | Washington, D.C. | Graduated. |
| Lyrik Shreiner | 3 | G | 6'2" | 210 | RS-Sophomore | Hawthorne, CA | Transferred to DePaul Blue Demons |
| Tavrion Dawson | 4 | F | 6'8" | 202 | Senior | Long Beach, CA | Graduated |
| Zeno Lake | 10 | F | 6'8" | 215 | Junior | Compton, CA | Did not return. |
| Mason Johnson | 13 | G | 6'2" | 185 | Freshman | Oxnard, CA | Walk-On. Did not make roster. |
| Jonathan Guevara | 14 | G | 6'1" | 165 | Junior | Los Angeles, CA | Did not return. |
| Kobe Paras | 21 | G | 6'6" | 200 | Sophomore | Manila, Philippines | Redshirt. Transferred to UP Fighting Maroons in the Philippines. |
| Carl Brown | 13 | G | 6'2" | 185 | Junior | Louisville, KY | Did not return. |
| Reggie Theus Jr. | 24 | F | 6'6" | 217 | Senior | Los Angeles, CA | Graduated. |
| Anthony Swan | 30 | F | 6'7" | 196 | Junior | Los Angeles, CA | Did not return. |

== Roster ==
2018–19 Cal State Northridge Matadors men's basketball team
Players
Coaches

| Pos. | # | Name | Height | Weight | Year | Previous school | Hometown |
|---|---|---|---|---|---|---|---|
| G | 1 | Rodney Henderson | 6 ft 5 in (1.96 m) | 190 lb (86 kg) | Jr | Santiago Canyon College | Carson, California |
| G | 2 | Elijah Harkless | 6 ft 3 in (1.91 m) | 180 lb (82 kg) | Fr | Etiwanda High School | Etiwanda, California |
| G | 3 | Terrell Gomez | 5 ft 8 in (1.73 m) | 160 lb (73 kg) | So | Inglewood High School | Los Angeles, California |
| G | 10 | Darius Brown II | 6 ft 1 in (1.85 m) | 180 lb (82 kg) | Fr | Pasadena High School | Pasadena, California |
| G | 12 | Alex Sokol | 6 ft 5 in (1.96 m) | 175 lb (79 kg) | So | Valley Christian High School | San Jose, California |
| F | 14 | Ron Artest III | 6 ft 7 in (2.01 m) | 215 lb (98 kg) | Fr | Hillcrest Prep (AZ) | New York, New York |
| G | 15 | Cameron Gottfried | 6 ft 3 in (1.91 m) | 180 lb (82 kg) | GS | NC State | Raleigh, North Carolina |
| F | 23 | Teddy Ochieng | 6 ft 8 in (2.03 m) | 200 lb (91 kg) | Fr | Cantwell-Sacred Heart of Mary High School | Nyando, Kenya |
| G | 24 | Avery Martínez | 6 ft 5 in (1.96 m) | 175 lb (79 kg) | Fr | Cantwell-Sacred Heart of Mary High School | San José, Costa Rica |
| F | 25 | Jared Pearre | 6 ft 9 in (2.06 m) | 190 lb (86 kg) | RS Fr | McKinney North High School | McKinney, Texas |
| C | 30 | Michael Ou | 6 ft 9 in (2.06 m) | 220 lb (100 kg) | Fr | Menaul School | Beijing, China |
| G | 32 | Brendan Harrick | 6 ft 5 in (1.96 m) | 190 lb (86 kg) | Fr | Esperanza High School | Anaheim, California |
| C | 34 | Mahamadou Kaba | 7 ft 0 in (2.13 m) | 273 lb (124 kg) | Jr | Balboa High School | Conakry, Guinea |
| F | 35 | Lamine Diane | 6 ft 7 in (2.01 m) | 200 lb (91 kg) | RS Fr | Findlay Prep | Dakar, Senegal |
| C | 42 | Blair Orr | 6 ft 8 in (2.03 m) | 252 lb (114 kg) | RS Sr | Winnipeg | Camarillo, California |

Head coach

- Mark Gottfried (Alabama)

Assistant coach(es)

- Mo Williams (Alabama)
- Jim Harrick (Charleston)
- Jeff Dunlap (UCLA)

Legend

- (C) Team captain
- (S) Suspended
- (I) Ineligible
- (W) Walk-on
- Injured
- Current redshirt

Roster
Last update: 14 September 2018

== Schedule ==
| Date time, TV | Rank^{#} | Opponent^{#} | Result | Record | High points | High rebounds | High assists | Site (attendance) city, state |
Exhibition
| October 25, 2018*; 7:00 pm, CSUN | | Antelope Valley | W 88–77 | | 30 – Diane | 17 – Diane | 7 – Brown | Matadome; Los Angeles, CA |
| November 1, 2018*; 7:00 pm, CSUN | | Cal State Los Angeles | W 89–87 | | 23 – Diane | 14 – Diane | 8 – Harkless | Matadome (818); Los Angeles, CA |
Non–conference regular season
| November 6, 2018*; 7:00 pm, CSUN | | New Mexico | L 84–87 | 0–1 | 34 – Diane | 7 – Diane | 6 – Harkless | Matadome (1,551); Los Angeles, CA |
| November 13, 2018*; 6:00 pm, TheW tv | | at Loyola Marymount | L 64–79 | 0–2 | 15 – Diane | 8 – Diane | 5 – Diane | Gersten Pavilion (862); Los Angeles, CA |
| November 17, 2018*; 6:00 pm, CSUN | | Portland | L 77–80 | 0–3 | 25 – Gomez | 12 – Diane | 7 – Gottfried | Matadome (886); Los Angeles, CA |
| November 20, 2018*; 7:00 pm, CSUN | | Tennessee State | W 80–77 | 1–3 | 28 – Diane | 12 – Diane | 4 – Tied | Matadome (858); Los Angeles, CA |
| November 27, 2018*; 8:00 pm, P12N | | at Washington State | L 94–103 | 1–4 | 32 – Diane | 18 – Diane | 6 – Brown II | Beasley Coliseum (1,909); Pullman, WA |
| December 1, 2018*; 7:00 pm, CSUN | | Sacramento State | L 68–88 | 1–5 | 19 – Diane | 7 – Diane | 3 – Tied | Matadome (812); Los Angeles, CA |
| December 3, 2018*; 7:00 pm, TheW TV | | at Pepperdine | W 90–83 | 2–5 | 29 – Diane | 12 – Diane | 9 – Brown II | Firestone Fieldhouse (1,215); Malibu, CA |
| December 5, 2018*; 7:00 pm, CSUN | | Cal State San Marcos | W 76–72 | 3–5 | 26 – Gomez | 6 – Orr | 7 – Brown II | Matadome (745); Los Angeles, CA |
| December 9, 2018*; 7:00 pm, TheW TV | | at San Diego; Las Vegas Classic | L 68–82 | 3–6 | 19 – Diane | 8 – Diane | 10 – Brown II | Jenny Craig Pavilion (1,456); San Diego, CA |
| December 16, 2018*; 3:00 pm, CSUN | | Pacific | L 77–79 | 3–7 | 23 – Diane | 8 – Diane | 7 – Brown II | Matadome (565); Los Angeles, CA |
| December 19, 2018*; 6:00 pm, WAC Digital | | at New Mexico State; Las Vegas Classic campus game | L 57–92 | 3–8 | 25 – Diane | 10 – Diane | 2 – Tied | Pan American Center (5,334); Las Cruces, NM |
| December 22, 2018*; 11:00 am | | vs. SIU Edwardsville; Las Vegas Classic visitors semifinals | W 85–79 | 4–8 | 22 – Gomez | 11 – Diane | 4 – Tied | Orleans Arena; Las Vegas, NV |
| December 23, 2018*; 1:30 pm | | vs. Rider; Las Vegas Classic visitors championship | W 81–80 | 5–8 | 24 – Diane | 9 – Diane | 2 – Tied | Orleans Arena (2,152); Las Vegas, NV |
| December 29, 2018*; 7:00 pm, CSUN | | Morgan State | W 94–86 | 6–8 | 29 – Gomez | 15 – Diane | 5 – Tied | Matadome (619); Los Angeles, CA |
| January 1, 2019*; 12:00 pm | | at San Diego State | L 60–65 | 6–9 | 23 – Diane | 14 – Diane | 8 – Brown II | Viejas Arena (9,971); San Diego, CA |
| January 5, 2019*; 7:00 pm, CSUN | | Yale | L 90–94 ^{OT} | 6–10 | 35 – Diane | 15 – Diane | 4 – Tied | Matadome (1,138); Los Angeles, CA |
Big West regular season
| January 9, 2019; 7:00 pm, ESPN3 | | at UC Riverside | W 84–83 | 7–10 (1–0) | 32 – Gomez | 8 – Diane | 7 – Diane | SRC Arena (437); Riverside, CA |
| January 12, 2019; 7:00 pm, Big West TV | | at Cal Poly | W 78–74 ^{OT} | 8–10 (2–0) | 23 – Gomez | 15 – Diane | 11 – Brown | Mott Athletics Center (2,513); San Luis Obispo, CA |
| January 17, 2019; 7:00 pm, ESPN3 | | Hawaii | L 79–84 | 8–11 (2–1) | 30 – Gomez | 16 – Diane | 7 – Brown | Matadome (815); Los Angeles, CA |
| January 19, 2019; 3:00 pm, CSUN | | UC Irvine | L 68–74 | 8–12 (2–2) | 21 – Diane | 10 – Brown | 6 – Brown | Matadome (947); Los Angeles, CA |
| January 23, 2019; 7:00 pm, ESPN3 | | Long Beach State | W 86–71 | 9–12 (3–2) | 21 – Gomez | 9 – Pearre | 7 – Brown | Matadome (985); Los Angeles, CA |
| January 30, 2019; 7:00 pm, ESPN3 | | at Cal State Fullerton | L 71–78 | 9–13 (3–3) | 39 – Diane | 13 – Diane | 5 – Brown | Titan Gym (934); Fullerton, CA |
| February 2, 2019; 7:00 pm, CSUN | | Cal Poly | W 83–65 | 10–13 (4–3) | 22 – Diane | 11 – Diane | 8 – Brown | Matadome (1,393); Los Angeles, CA |
| February 6, 2019; 7:00 pm, Big West TV | | at UC Santa Barbara | L 64–70 | 10–14 (4–4) | 28 – Diane | 7 – Henderson | 6 – Brown | The Thunderdome (1,334); Santa Barbara, CA |
| February 13, 2019; 7:00 pm, Big West TV | | at UC Davis | L 59–76 | 10–15 (4–5) | 24 – Gomez | 9 – Diane | 4 – Brown | The Pavilion (1,687); Davis, CA |
| February 16, 2019; 7:00 pm, CSUN | | Cal State Fullerton | L 71–78 | 10–16 (4–6) | 25 – Diane | 17 – Diane | 5 – Brown | Matadome (1,137); Los Angeles, CA |
| February 20, 2019; 7:00 pm, Big West TV | | at Long Beach State | L 78–80 | 10–17 (4–7) | 19 – Brown | 10 – Diane | 5 – Brown | Walter Pyramid (1,848); Long Beach, CA |
| February 23, 2019; 7:00 pm, ESPN3 | | UC Davis | W 81–76 ^{OT} | 11–17 (5–7) | 35 – Diane | 11 – Diane | 6 – Brown | Matadome (767); Los Angeles, CA |
| February 27, 2019; 7:00 pm, CSUN | | UC Riverside | W 70–68 | 12–17 (6–7) | 24 – Gomez | 12 – Diane | 5 – Brown | Matadome (1,020); Los Angeles, CA |
| March 2, 2019; 10:00 pm, Spectrum HI | | at Hawaii | W 84–73 | 13–17 (7–7) | 32 – Gomez | 7 – Diane | 3 – Gomez | Stan Sheriff Center (6,673); Honolulu, HI |
| March 7, 2019; 7:00 pm, ESPN3 | | UC Santa Barbara | L 74–76 | 13–18 (7–8) | 34 – Diane | 13 – Diane | 5 – Brown II | Matadome (1,993); Los Angeles, CA |
| March 9, 2019; 7:30 pm, ESPN3/KDOC-TV | | at UC Irvine | L 74–86 | 13–19 (7–9) | 33 – Diane | 18 – Diane | 4 – Brown | Bren Events Center (3,018); Irvine, CA |
Big West tournament
| March 14, 2019; 12:00 pm, ESPN3 | (7) | vs. (2) UC Santa Barbara; Quarterfinals | L 68–71 | 13–20 | 22 – Diane | 17 – Diane | 4 – Diane | Honda Center (3,656); Anaheim, CA |
College Basketball Invitational
| March 19, 2019*; 6:00 pm, ESPN3 | | at Utah Valley; First round | L 84–92 | 13–21 | 27 – Diane | 7 – Diane | 5 – Gottfried | UCCU Center (375); Orem, UT |
*Non-conference game. ^{#}Rankings from AP Poll. (#) Tournament seedings in parentheses. All times are in Pacific.
