= 2018–19 Long Beach State 49ers men's basketball team =

American college basketball season

2018–19 Long Beach State 49ers men's basketball
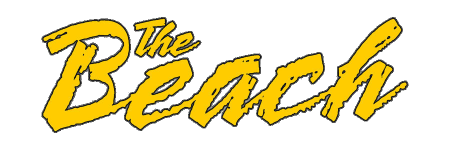
- Conference: Big West Conference
- Record: 15–19 (8–8 Big West)
- Head coach: Dan Monson (12th season)
- Assistant coaches: Myke Scholl; Senque Carey; Bobby Braswell
- Home arena: Walter Pyramid (Capacity: 4,200)

2018–19 Big West men's basketball standings
	Conf.				Overall
Team	W		L	PCT	W		L	PCT
UC Irvine †	15	–	1	.938	31	–	6	.838
UC Santa Barbara	10	–	6	.625	22	–	10	.688
Cal State Fullerton	10	–	6	.625	16	–	18	.471
Hawai'i	9	–	7	.563	18	–	13	.581
Long Beach State	8	–	8	.500	15	–	19	.441
UC Davis	7	–	9	.438	11	–	20	.355
Cal State Northridge	7	–	9	.438	13	–	21	.382
UC Riverside	4	–	12	.250	10	–	23	.303
Cal Poly	2	–	14	.125	6	–	23	.207
† 2019 Big West tournament winner

The 2018–19 Long Beach State 49ers men's basketball team represented California State University, Long Beach in the 2018–19 NCAA Division I men's basketball season. The 49ers, led by twelfth-year head coach Dan Monson, competed in the Walter Pyramid. Long Beach State was a member of the Big West Conference, and participated in their 50th consecutive season in that league.

== Before the season ==
The 49ers finished the season 15–18 overall, and 9–7 in the conference. During the season, the 49ers participated in the AdvoCare Invitational, which was held in Morgantown, West Virginia and Lake Buena Vista, Florida. Long Beach State earned 6th place by defeating Oregon State and losing to Missouri as well as Nebraska. Prior to the tournament, Long Beach State lost in a friendly match at West Virginia. In the postseason, Long Beach State lost to Cal State Fullerton in the quarterfinals of the 2018 Big West Conference men's basketball tournament in Anaheim, California.

Within a few days of the elimination, Dan Monson accepted a five-year contract extension (through the 2022–23 school year) as a result of his past success at Long Beach State. Monson was rehired for multiple reasons, ranging from running the program primarily on sport ethics to his "on the court" results. To this season, Monson led the program to a Big West winning record each season since 2010–11 and participated in the NCAA tournament once.

Greg Floyd Jr. was a four-star recruit who turned down twenty-four other NCAA Division I schools for Long Beach State on September 7, 2016. Floyd was the highest rated incoming 49er since Jacob Thomas and Shelton Boykin, who were both a part of the recruiting class of 2010. On April 9, 2018, the Los Angeles Ballers announced that Floyd was ineligible [through the NCAA] to compete at Long Beach State due to scholastic probation at his former school. As a result, Floyd is currently an athlete for the Ballers, and the NCAA withdrew his commitment.

By July 17, 2018, Long Beach State redesigned the court by emphasizing on the color black, removing The Beach motto for the main athletics logo, and installing darker wood. However, some of the former features of the previous court design still remain in a different fashion, such as the social media hashtags #GoBeach and #LBNation.

== Roster ==
2018–19 Long Beach State 49ers men's basketball team
Players
Coaches

Pos.	#	Name	Height	Weight	Year	Previous school	Hometown
G	1	Ron Freeman (redshirt)	6 ft 6 in (1.98 m)	180 lb (82 kg)	RS Jr	Northwest Florida State College	Los Angeles, California
G/F	2	Jordan Roberts	6 ft 8 in (2.03 m)	195 lb (88 kg)	So	Ridgeview High School	Bakersfield, California
F	4	KJ Byers	6 ft 7 in (2.01 m)	195 lb (88 kg)	Sr	Panola College	Charlotte, North Carolina
C	5	Mason Riggins	6 ft 8 in (2.03 m)	230 lb (104 kg)	Sr	Whitewright High School	Whitewright, Texas
G	10	Bryan Alberts	6 ft 5 in (1.96 m)	200 lb (91 kg)	RS Sr	Gonzaga	Los Angeles, California
G	11	Jordan Griffin	6 ft 3 in (1.91 m)	165 lb (75 kg)	Jr	Centennial High School	Corona, California
F	12	Breyon Jackson	6 ft 8 in (2.03 m)	215 lb (98 kg)	So	Cloud County Community College	Washington, D.C.
G/F	13	Demetrius Mims	6 ft 6 in (1.98 m)	170 lb (77 kg)	Fr	Baltimore Polytechnic Institute	Baltimore, Maryland
G	14	Colin Slater	6 ft 1 in (1.85 m)	175 lb (79 kg)	Jr	Tulane	New Orleans, Louisiana
G	15	Deishuan Booker	6 ft 3 in (1.91 m)	170 lb (77 kg)	Sr	College of Southern Idaho	Las Vegas, Nevada
G	20	Breamon Richard	5 ft 10 in (1.78 m)	160 lb (73 kg)	Sr	Long Beach City College	Los Angeles, California
G	23	Edon Maxhuni	6 ft 2 in (1.88 m)	185 lb (84 kg)	So	Helsinki Basketball Academy	Hyvinkää, Finland
C	23	Temidayo Yussuf (redshirt)	6 ft 7 in (2.01 m)	265 lb (120 kg)	RS Sr	St. Joseph Notre Dame High School	Oakland, California
C	35	Milos Apic (redshirt)	6 ft 10 in (2.08 m)	200 lb (91 kg)	RS Fr	Sandy Spring Friends School	Novi Sad, Serbia

Head coach

- Dan Monson (Idaho)

Assistant coach(es)

- Myke Scholl (Loyola Marymount)
- Senque Carey (New Mexico)
- Bobby Braswell (Cal State Northridge)

Legend

- (C) Team captain
- (S) Suspended
- (I) Ineligible
- (W) Walk-on
- Injured
- Current redshirt

Roster
Last update: 14 July 2018

== Schedule ==
Date time, TV	Rank^{#}	Opponent^{#}	Result	Record	High points	High rebounds	High assists	Site (attendance) city, state
Non-conference regular season
November 9, 2018*; 8:00 pm, P12N		at No. 21 UCLA	L 80–91	0–1	31 – Booker	6 – Byers	4 – Tied	Pauley Pavilion (7,920); Los Angeles, CA
November 10, 2018*; 4:00 pm		Menlo College; Homecoming	W 78–57	1–1	19 – Booker	8 – Tied	3 – Cobb	Walter Pyramid (3,888); Long Beach, CA
November 12, 2018*; 6:00 pm, P12N		at Arizona State; MGM Resorts Main Event	L 58–90	1–2	9 – Griffin	6 – Riggins	5 – Booker	Wells Fargo Arena (8,818); Tempe, AZ
November 16, 2018*; 8:01 pm, SECN		at No. 17 Mississippi State; MGM Resorts Main Event	L 51–79	1–3	8 – Tied	5 – Tied	3 – Booker	Humphrey Coliseum (8,106); Starkville, MS
November 19, 2018*; 1:00 pm		vs. Iona; MGM Resorts Main Event Middleweight semifinals	W 86-85	2-3	18 – Yussuf	10 – Byers	7 – Booker	Cox Pavilion; Paradise, Nevada
November 21, 2018*; 1:00 pm		vs. Utah Valley; MGM Resorts Main Event Middleweight championship	L 72-87	2-4	29 – Booker	6 – Byers	74 – Booker	Cox Pavilion; Paradise, Nevada
November 25, 2018*; 2:00 pm		Oregon State	L 72–75	2–5	15 – Maxhuni	11 – Yussuf	5 – Booker	Walter Pyramid (2,082); Long Beach, CA
November 28, 2018*; 8:00 pm, P12N		at USC	L 65-75	2-6	13 – Tied	7 – Roberts	3 – Alberts	Galen Center (2,031); Los Angeles, CA
December 1, 2018*; 7:00 pm		at San Diego	L 70-74	2-7	28 – Yussuf	14 – Byers	2 – Tied	Jenny Craig Pavilion (1,419); San Diego, CA
December 5, 2018*; 7:00 pm		Southern Utah	W 82-71	3-7	21 – Booker	13 – Yussuf	4 – Booker	Walter Pyramid (1,876); Long Beach, CA
December 8, 2018*		at Fresno State	L 71-92	3-8	18 – Alberts	6 – Tied	3 – Booker	Save Mart Center (5,945); Fresno, CA
December 10, 2018*		at Pacific	L 68-74	3-9	14 – Yussuf	10 – Yussuf	3 – Tied	Alex G. Spanos Center (1,247); Stockton, CA
December 20, 2018*		Pepperdine	W 67-66	4-9	21 – Yussuf	11 – Yussuf	5 – Ross	Walter Pyramid (1,617); Long Beach, CA
December 22, 2018*		Colorado State	W 64-61	5-9	14 – Booker	10 – Riggins	3 – Tied	Walter Pyramid (1,727); Long Beach, CA
December 29, 2018*; 7:30 pm, P12N		at Stanford	L 86-93	5-10	22 – Alberts	8 – Yussuf	8 – Booker	Maples Pavilion (3,452); Stanford, CA
January 5, 2019*; 7:00 pm		Bethesda University	W 124–52	6–10	35 – Alberts	12 – Riggins	11 – Booker	Walter Pyramid (1,867); Long Beach, CA
Big West regular season
January 12, 2019; 4:00 pm, ESPN3		UC Davis	W 82–77	7–10 (1–0)	32 – Booker	12 – Riggins	2 – Booker	Walter Pyramid (3,002); Long Beach, CA
January 16, 2019; 7:00 pm, ESPN3		at UC Irvine	W 80–70	8–10 (2–0)	28 – Booker	7 – Alberts	6 – Booker	Bren Events Center (1,530); Irvine, CA
January 19, 2019; 7:00 p.m.		Cal State Fullerton	L 90–92 ^{OT}	8–11 (2–1)	33 – Booker	11 – Byers	5 – Booker	Walter Pyramid (2,312); Long Beach, CA
January 23, 2019; 7:00 pm, ESPN3		at Cal State Northridge	L 71–86	8–12 (2–2)	20 – Booker	7 – Riggins	5 – Booker	Matadome (985); Los Angeles, CA
January 26, 2019; 7:00 pm, ESPN3		UC Santa Barbara	L 71–82	8–13 (2–3)	25 – Booker	9 – Booker	7 – Booker	Walter Pyramid (2,333); Long Beach, CA
January 31, 2019; 9:00 pm, Spectrum Sports HI		at Hawaii	L 57–74	8–14 (2–4)	18 – Riggins	9 – Byers	3 – Booker	Stan Sheriff Center (5,293); Honolulu, HI
February 2, 2019; 7:00 p.m.		UC Irvine	L 80–82	8–15 (2–5)	29 – Booker	10 – Byers	5 – Booker	Walter Pyramid (2,344); Long Beach, CA
February 7, 2019; 7:00 pm, ESPN3		Hawaii	L 70–77	8–16 (2–6)	18 – Yussuf	10 – Byers	4 – Booker	Walter Pyramid (2,177); Long Beach, CA
February 9, 2019		at Cal Poly	W 76–68 ^{OT}	9–16 (3–6)	23 – Booker	12 – Yussuf	4 – Booker	Mott Athletics Center (1,970); San Luis Obispo, CA
February 13, 2019; 7:00 pm, ESPN3		at Cal State Fullerton	L 82–85	9–17 (3–7)	22 – Booker	8 – Yussuf	5 – Booker	Titan Gym (1,621); Fullerton, CA
February 16, 2019; 7:00 p.m.		at UC Davis	L 73–77	9–18 (3–8)	20 – Booker	11 – Riggins	3 – Roberts	The Pavilion (1,882); Davis, CA
February 20, 2019; 7:00 p.m.		Cal State Northridge	W 80–78	10–18 (4–8)	20 – Alberts	13 – Cobb	4 – Booker	Walter Pyramid (1,848); Long Beach, CA
February 23, 2019; 5:00 p.m.		at UC Riverside	W 71–67 ^{OT}	11–18 (5–8)	18 – Roberts	9 – Yussuf	5 – Cobb	SRC Arena (459); Riverside, CA
February 28, 2019; 7:00 p.m.		at UC Santa Barbara	W 69–64	12–18 (6–8)	26 – Booker	9 – Riggins	4 – Booker	The Thunderdome (3,118); Santa Barbara, CA
March 2, 2019; 7:00 pm, ESPN3		Cal Poly	W 94–85	13–18 (7–8)	31 – Booker	10 – Booker	5 – Booker	Walter Pyramid (2,172); Long Beach, CA
March 6, 2019; 7:00 pm		UC Riverside	W 70–57	14–18 (8–8)	21 – Booker	10 – Yussuf	4 – Booker	Walter Pyramid (2,038); Long Beach, CA
Big West tournament
March 14, 2019; 8:30 pm, ESPN3	(5)	vs. (4) Hawaii; Quarterfinals	W 68–66	15–18	18 – Roberts	9 – Roberts	3 – Booker	Honda Center (3,656); Anaheim, California
March 15, 2019; 6:30 pm, ESPN3	(5)	vs. (1) UC Irvine; Semifinals	L 67–75	15–19	21 – Booker	8 – Yussuf	3 – Booker	Honda Center (4,389); Anaheim, California
*Non-conference game. ^{#}Rankings from AP Poll. (#) Tournament seedings in parentheses. All times are in Pacific.
