= 2018–19 UC Riverside Highlanders men's basketball team =

American college basketball season

2018–19 UC Riverside Highlanders men's basketball
- Conference: Big West Conference
- Record: 10–23 (4–12 Big West)
- Head coach: David Patrick (1st season)
- Assistant coaches: Justin Bell; Mike Magpayo; Michael Czepil
- Home arena: SRC Arena (Capacity: 2,750)

2018–19 Big West men's basketball standings
	Conf.				Overall
Team	W		L	PCT	W		L	PCT
UC Irvine †	15	–	1	.938	31	–	6	.838
UC Santa Barbara	10	–	6	.625	22	–	10	.688
Cal State Fullerton	10	–	6	.625	16	–	18	.471
Hawai'i	9	–	7	.563	18	–	13	.581
Long Beach State	8	–	8	.500	15	–	19	.441
UC Davis	7	–	9	.438	11	–	20	.355
Cal State Northridge	7	–	9	.438	13	–	21	.382
UC Riverside	4	–	12	.250	10	–	23	.303
Cal Poly	2	–	14	.125	6	–	23	.207
† 2019 Big West tournament winner

The 2018–19 UC Riverside Highlanders men's basketball team represented the University of California, Riverside in the 2018–19 NCAA Division I men's basketball season. The Highlanders, led by first-year head coach David Patrick, competed at the SRC Arena. UC Riverside was a member of the Big West Conference, and participated in their 18th consecutive season in that league.

The Highlanders finished the season 10–23 overall, 4–12 in Big West play, finishing in 8th place. In the Big West tournament, they were defeated by UC Irvine in the quarterfinals.

== Before the season ==
The Highlanders finished the 2017–18 season 9–22 overall, and 4–12 in the Big West Conference. In the postseason, they lost to UC Davis in the quarterfinals of 2018 Big West Conference men's basketball tournament.

== Roster ==
2018–19 UC Riverside Highlanders men's basketball team
Players
Coaches

Pos.	#	Name	Height	Weight	Year	Previous school	Hometown
G	0	Dragan Elkaz	6 ft 5 in (1.96 m)	205 lb (93 kg)	Fr	Westfields Sports High School	Green Valley, Australia
G	1	D.J. Sylvester (redshirt)	6 ft 3 in (1.91 m)	185 lb (84 kg)	RS Jr	Morse High School	Victorville, CA
G	2	Jordan Gilliam	6 ft 5 in (1.96 m)	160 lb (73 kg)	So	Salt Lake Community College	Houston, TX
G	3	D.J. McDonald	5 ft 11 in (1.8 m)	175 lb (79 kg)	Fr	Bishop Alemany High School	Sylmar, CA
F	10	Ajani Kennedy	6 ft 8 in (2.03 m)	200 lb (91 kg)	So	Rancho Verde High School	Moreno Valley, CA
F	11	Zac Watson	6 ft 7 in (2.01 m)	210 lb (95 kg)	Fr	Liberty High School	Plano, TX
F	13	Eric Rwahwire (redshirt)	6 ft 5 in (1.96 m)	210 lb (95 kg)	RS Jr	Saddleback Church	Toronto, ON
G	15	Dikymbe Martin	6 ft 1 in (1.85 m)	170 lb (77 kg)	Jr	John W. North High School	Riverside, CA
G	22	Dominick Pickett (redshirt)	6 ft 3 in (1.91 m)	210 lb (95 kg)	RS So	Rancho Verde High School	Moreno Valley, CA
F	24	Kendall Stubblefield	6 ft 5 in (1.96 m)	225 lb (102 kg)	Fr	Bellarmine College Preparatory	San Jose, CA
C	25	Callum McRae	7 ft 1 in (2.16 m)	275 lb (125 kg)	Fr	Palmerston North Boys' High School	Palmerston North, New Zealand
G	31	Ryker Pierce (redshirt)	6 ft 5 in (1.96 m)	205 lb (93 kg)	RS Sr	Cowley Community College	Rexburg, ID
C	32	Menno Dijkstra	7 ft 0 in (2.13 m)	230 lb (104 kg)	Sr	Canarias Basketball Academy	Moerdijk, Netherlands
G	35	George III Willborn	6 ft 3 in (1.91 m)	195 lb (88 kg)	So	UTSA	Chicago, IL

Head coach

- David Patrick (Lafayette–Louisiana)

Assistant coach(es)

- Justin Bell (UC Riverside)
- Mike Magpayo (UC Santa Barbara)
- Michael Czepil (Nicholls State)

Legend

- (C) Team captain
- (S) Suspended
- (I) Ineligible
- (W) Walk-on
- Injured
- Current redshirt

Roster
Last update: 4 March 2025

== Schedule ==
Date time, TV	Rank^{#}	Opponent^{#}	Result	Record	High points	High rebounds	High assists	Site (attendance) city, state
Non–conference regular season
6 November 2018*; 6:00 p.m., P12N		at Oregon State	L 59–72	0–1	20 – Martin	6 – McRae	5 – Gilliam	Gill Coliseum (3,590); Corvallis, OR
10 November 2018*; 7:05 p.m.		at Portland State	L 64–71	0–2	11 – tied	6 – Dijkstra	8 – Gilliam	Viking Pavilion (1,424); Portland, OR
13 November 2018*; 7:00 p.m.		at UNLV	L 51–72	0–3	14 – Martin	6 – tied	2 – tied	Thomas & Mack Center (7,327); Paradise, NV
17 November 2018*; 4:00 p.m.		UC Merced; Homecoming	W 63-53	1-3	13 – tied	8 – Rwahire	4 – Gilliam	SRC Arena (1,576); Riverside, CA
22 November 2018*; 12:30 p.m.		at Pacific; Tiger Turkey Tip-Off	L 54-74	1-4	20 – Martin	6 – tied	2 – tied	Alex G. Spanos Center (384); Stockton, CA
23 November 2018*; 8:00 p.m.		vs. Elon; Tiger Turkey Tip-Off	W 77-64	2-4	17 – Gilliam	6 – tied	3 – Gilliam	Alex G. Spanos Center (1,663); Stockton, CA
24 November 2018*; 5:30 p.m.		vs. Abilene Christian; Tiger Turkey Tip-Off	L 48-60	2-5	17 – Martin	6 – tied	3 – Gilliam	Alex G. Spanos Center (254); Stockton, CA
29 November 2018*; 7:00 p.m.		California Baptist	L 70-80	2-6	18 – tied	6 – Martin	3 – Gilliam	SRC Arena (1,328); Riverside, CA
2 December 2018*; 11:30 a.m., ESPN+		at Valparaiso	L 73-82	2-7	21 – Martin	6 – Pickett	3 – tied	Athletics–Recreation Center (2,112); Valparaiso, IN
6 December 2018*; 7:00 p.m.		Pepperdine	W 75-71	3-7	22 – Martin	6 – Dijkstra	4 – tied	SRC Arena (414); Riverside, CA
16 December 2018*; 12:00 p.m.		at UTEP	L 56-68	3-8	19 – Martin	7 – Kennedy	4 – tied	Don Haskins Center (4,454); El Paso, TX
19 December 2018*; 7:00 p.m.		Life Pacific College	W 87–50	4–8	13 – Kennedy	7 – McRae	6 – Pickett	SRC Arena (147); Riverside, CA
22 December 2018*; 5:00 p.m.		Loyola Marymount	W 60–53	5–8	18 – Martin	6 – Pickett	8 – Pickett	SRC Arena (339); Riverside, CA
28 December 2018*; 6:00 p.m.		at Air Force	L 60–72	5–9	17 – Martin	5 – Kennedy	5 – Martin	Clune Arena (1,366); Colorado Springs, CO
30 December 2018*; 1:00 p.m., ESPN3		at Western Michigan	L 64–73	5–10	22 – Kennedy	8 – Watson	3 – Martin	University Arena (2,085); Kalamazoo, MI
4 January 2018*; 7:00 p.m.		Bethesda University	W 112–47	6–10	25 – Watson	13 – Dijkstra	9 – Gilliam	SRC Arena (310); Riverside, CA
Big West regular season
9 January 2019; 7:00 p.m., ESPN3		Cal State Northridge	L 83–84	6–11 (0–1)	25 – Martin	8 – Kennedy	6 – Martin	SRC Arena (437); Riverside, CA
12 January 2019; 7:00 p.m.		at UC Santa Barbara	L 64–72	6–12 (0–2)	19 – Kennedy	7 – Pickett	4 – McDonald	The Thunderdome (1,526); Santa Barbara, CA
17 January 2019; 7:00 p.m.		at Cal State Fullerton	L 61–69	6–13 (0–3)	13 – Pickett	5 – Pickett	5 – Martin	Titan Gym (669); Fullerton, CA
19 January 2019; 5:00 p.m., ESPN3		Hawaii	W 75–71	7–13 (1–3)	25 – Elkaz	5 – McRae	5 – Martin	SRC Arena (453); Riverside, CA
23 January 2019; 7:00 p.m.		at Cal Poly	W 74–51	8–13 (2–3)	15 – Kennedy	10 – Pickett	5 – Pickett	Mott Athletics Center (1,622); San Luis Obispo, CA
26 January 2019; 7:00 p.m.		at UC Irvine	L 64–82	8–14 (2–4)	16 – Martin	10 – McRae	4 – McDonald	Bren Events Center (1,725); Irvine, CA
31 January 2019; 7:00 p.m., ESPN3		Cal Poly	L 45–71	8–15 (2–5)	10 – McRae	7 – Dijkstra	4 – Martin	SRC Arena (780); Riverside, CA
2 February 2019; 6:00 p.m., ESPN3		UC Davis	L 71–84	8–16 (2–6)	15 – Gilliam	6 – Gilliam	5 – Watson	SRC Arena (350); Riverside, CA
9 February 2019; 5:00 p.m.		Cal State Fullerton	L 54–77	8–17 (2–7)	16 – Martin	7 – Watson	3 – Pickett	SRC Arena (1,076); Riverside, CA
14 February 2019; 7:00 p.m., ESPN3		UC Santa Barbara	W 71–57	9–17 (3–7)	18 – Martin	7 – Pickett	5 – Pickett	SRC Arena (466); Riverside, CA
16 February 2019; 10:00 p.m.		at Hawaii	L 64–87	9–18 (3–8)	22 – Martin	4 – Dijkstra	3 – Martin	Stan Sheriff Center (6,636); Honolulu, HI
23 February 2019; 5:00 p.m.		Long Beach State	L 67–71 ^{OT}	9–19 (3–9)	16 – McRae	10 – McRae	5 – Martin	SRC Arena (459); Riverside, CA
27 February 2019; 7:00 p.m.		at Cal State Northridge	L 78–80	9–20 (3–10)	20 – McRae	14 – McRae	6 – Martin	Matadome (1,020); Los Angeles, CA
2 March 2019; 5:00 p.m.		UC Irvine	L 47–68	9–21 (3–11)	12 – Elkaz	12 – McRae	3 – Gilliam	SRC Arena (686); Riverside, CA
6 March 2019; 7:00 p.m.		at Long Beach State	L 57–70	9–22 (3–12)	12 – McDonald	8 – McRae	2 – McDonald	Walter Pyramid (2,038); Long Beach, CA
9 March 2019; 7:00 p.m.		at UC Davis	W 71–70	10–22 (4–12)	17 – Martin	10 – Dijkstra	3 – Pickett	The Pavilion (2,117); Davis, CA
Big West tournament
14 March 2019; 6:00 p.m., ESPN3	(8)	vs. (1) UC Irvine; Quarterfinals	L 44–63	10–23	11 – Gilliam	10 – Dijkstra	3 – McRae	Honda Center (3,656); Anaheim, CA
*Non-conference game. ^{#}Rankings from AP Poll. (#) Tournament seedings in parentheses. All times are in Pacific.
