= 2018–19 Cal State Fullerton Titans men's basketball team =

American college basketball season

2018–19 Cal State Fullerton Titans men's basketball

CIT, First round
- Conference: Big West Conference
- Record: 16–18 (10–6 Big West)
- Head coach: Dedrique Taylor (6th season)
- Assistant coaches: John Smith (6th season); Danny Sprinkle (6th season); Antonio Santos
- Home arena: Titan Gym (Capacity: 4,000)

2018–19 Big West men's basketball standings
	Conf.				Overall
Team	W		L	PCT	W		L	PCT
UC Irvine †	15	–	1	.938	31	–	6	.838
UC Santa Barbara	10	–	6	.625	22	–	10	.688
Cal State Fullerton	10	–	6	.625	16	–	18	.471
Hawai'i	9	–	7	.563	18	–	13	.581
Long Beach State	8	–	8	.500	15	–	19	.441
UC Davis	7	–	9	.438	11	–	20	.355
Cal State Northridge	7	–	9	.438	13	–	21	.382
UC Riverside	4	–	12	.250	10	–	23	.303
Cal Poly	2	–	14	.125	6	–	23	.207
† 2019 Big West tournament winner

The 2018–19 Cal State Fullerton Titans men's basketball team represented California State University, Fullerton in the 2018–19 NCAA Division I men's basketball season. The Titans were led by sixth-year head coach Dedrique Taylor and competed at the Titan Gym. CSU Fullerton was a member of the Big West Conference, and participated in their 45th consecutive season in that league. They finished the season 16–18, 10–6 in Big West play to finish in a tie for second place. On March 15, Fullerton defeated UCSB to reach the finals of the Big West tournament, where they played top-seeded UC Irvine in an attempt to reach the NCAA tournament for the second successive year; however, the Titans were handily defeated by the Anteaters, 92–64, in a rematch of the previous year's championship. They were invited to the CollegeInsider.com Tournament where they lost in the first round to Cal State Bakersfield.

== Previous season ==
The Titans finished 20–12 overall, and 10–6 in the conference. During the season, the Titans participated in the Wooden Legacy, which was held in Fullerton, California. The Titans finished in 5th place from defeating Harvard and Sacramento State but losing to Georgia. In the postseason, CSU Fullerton defeated Long Beach State, UC Davis, and UC Irvine to become champions of the 2018 Big West Conference men's basketball tournament in Anaheim, California. In addition, the Titans participated in the 2018 NCAA Division I men's basketball tournament, where they lost to Purdue in Detroit, Michigan in the first round.

== Roster ==
2018–19 Cal State Fullerton Titans men's basketball team
Players
Coaches

Pos.	#	Name	Height	Weight	Year	Previous school	Hometown
G	0	Kyle Allman Jr.	6 ft 4 in (1.93 m)	182 lb (83 kg)	Sr	C.T.E.A. High School	New York, New York
G	1	Jamal Smith	6 ft 3 in (1.91 m)	170 lb (77 kg)	Jr	Rancho Verde High School	Moreno Valley, California
G	2	Daniel Venzant	5 ft 10 in (1.78 m)	163 lb (74 kg)	So	Midland High School	Midland, Texas
F	5	Davon Clare	6 ft 5 in (1.96 m)	220 lb (100 kg)	Jr	Harker Heights High School	Killeen, Texas
G	10	Austen Awosika	6 ft 3 in (1.91 m)	193 lb (88 kg)	Jr	Ayala High School	Chino Hills, California
G	11	Wayne Arnold	6 ft 4 in (1.93 m)	170 lb (77 kg)	Fr	Dominguez High School	Los Angeles, California
G	12	Landon Kirkwood	6 ft 3 in (1.91 m)	184 lb (83 kg)	So	Brooklyn Center High School	Brooklyn Park, Minnesota
G	14	Khalil Ahmad	6 ft 3 in (1.91 m)	209 lb (95 kg)	Sr	Centennial High School	Corona, California
G	15	José García	6 ft 3 in (1.91 m)	180 lb (82 kg)	So	Los Alamitos High School	Los Alamitos, California
F	21	Dominik Heinzl	6 ft 7 in (2.01 m)	239 lb (108 kg)	Sr	Laramie County Community College	Prague, Czech Republic
F	22	Amel Kuljuhovic	6 ft 10 in (2.08 m)	255 lb (116 kg)	Jr	Lake Land College	Waterloo, Iowa
F	23	Gaber Ozegovic (redshirt)	6 ft 6 in (1.98 m)	195 lb (88 kg)	RS Fr	Slovene Littoral	Kranj, Slovenia
F	24	Josh Pitts	6 ft 9 in (2.06 m)	248 lb (112 kg)	So	Memorial High School	San Antonio, Texas
F	33	Johnny Wang	6 ft 9 in (2.06 m)	245 lb (111 kg)	So	Santa Margarita Catholic High School	Beijing, China
F	34	Jackson Rowe	6 ft 7 in (2.01 m)	210 lb (95 kg)	Jr	Wasatch Academy	Toronto, Canada

Head coach

- Dedrique Taylor (UC Davis)

Assistant coach(es)

- John Smith (Dominican (CA))
- Danny Sprinkle (Montana State)
- Anthony Santos (Cal State Fullerton)

Legend

- (C) Team captain
- (S) Suspended
- (I) Ineligible
- (W) Walk-on
- Injured
- Current redshirt

Roster
Last update: 28 September 2018

== Schedule ==
Date time, TV	Rank^{#}	Opponent^{#}	Result	Record	High points	High rebounds	High assists	Site (attendance) city, state
Exhibition
November 3, 2018*; 2:00 pm		at San Diego Christian	W 93–59		19 – Allman	8 – Smith	5 – Tied	Titan Gym (472); Fullerton, CA
Non–conference regular season
November 6, 2018*; 6:00 pm, P12N		at Arizona State	L 94–102 ^{2OT}	0–1	35 – Allman	7 – Tied	7 – Awosika	Wells Fargo Arena (9,145); Tempe, AZ
November 10, 2018*; 2:00 pm		West Coast Baptist	W 106–53	1–1	23 – Arnold	7 – Rowe	5 – Tied	Titan Gym (667); Fullerton, CA
November 15, 2018*; 1:30pm, ESPN3		vs. UCF; Myrtle Beach Invitational quarterfinals	L 52–68	1–2	15 – Ahmad	4 – Tied	4 – Awosika	HTC Center (1,317); Myrtle Beach, SC
November 16, 2018*; 11:00am, ESPN3		vs. Wake Forest; Myrtle Beach Invitational consolation semifinals	L 59–66	1–3	20 – Ahmad	9 – Clare	8 – Allman	HTC Center (955); Myrtle Beach, SC
November 18, 2018*; 12:30pm, ESPN3		vs. Monmouth; Myrtle Beach Invitational 7th place game	W 87–63	2–3	40 – Ahmad	10 – Rowe	7 – Awosika	HTC Center (780); Myrtle Beach, SC
November 21, 2018*; 7:00pm		at Hofstra	L 71–80	2–4	38 – Allman	11 – Rowe	3 – Tied	Mack Sports Complex (1,153); Hempstead, NY
November 24, 2018*; 7:05 pm		at Sacramento State	L 82–87 ^{OT}	2–5	17 – Rowe	10 – Awosika	4 – Tied	The Nest (538); Sacramento, CA
December 1, 2018*; 6:00 pm		California Lutheran	W 99–60	3–5	29 – Ahmad	6 – Tied	7 – Rowe	Titan Gym (3,131); Fullerton, CA
December 5, 2018*; 7:00 pm		Loyola Marymount	L 49–59	3–6	14 – Allman Jr.	8 – Tied	5 – Awosika	Titan Gym (1,024); Fullerton, CA
December 10, 2018*		at Saint Mary's	L 66–81	3–7	19 – Awosika	4 – Tied	5 – Awosika	McKeon Pavilion (2,429); Moraga, CA
December 16, 2018*; 1:00 pm		at San Francisco	L 54–68	3–8	14 – Allman	7 – Kuljuhovic	3 – Smith	Sobrato Center (1,581); San Francisco, CA
December 22, 2018*; 11:00AM, BTN		at No. 25 Nebraska	L 62–86	3–9	16 – Allman	9 – Awosika	1 – 8 Tied	Pinnacle Bank Arena (15,088); Lincoln, NE
December 29, 2018*; 6:00 pm		Portland	W 79–64	4–9	26 – Allman	11 – Awosika	7 – Awosika	Titan Gym (783); Fullerton, CA
January 1, 2019*; 7:00 pm, P12N		at Washington	L 76–84	4–10	28 – Ahmad	11 – Rowe	9 – Awosika	Edumundson Pavilion (5,083); Seattle, WA
Big West regular season
January 9, 2019; 9:00 pm, Spectrum HI		at Hawaii	L 68–79	4–11 (0–1)	24 – Ahmad	8 – Awosika	2 – Awosika	Stan Sheriff Center (4,971); Honolulu, HI
January 12, 2019; 6:00 pm		UC Irvine	L 46–63	4–12 (0–2)	17 – Awosika	7 – Ahmad	2 – Clare	Titan Gym (1,347); Fullerton, CA
January 17, 2019; 7:00 p.m.		UC Riverside	W 69–61	5–12 (1–2)	21 – Allman	5 – Arnold	4 – Allman	Titan Gym (669); Fullerton, CA
January 19, 2019; 7:00 p.m.		at Long Beach State	W 92–90 ^{OT}	6–12 (2–2)	30 – Allman	9 – Rowe	5 – Awosika	Walter Pyramid (2,312); Long Beach, CA
January 24, 2019; 7:00 p.m.		UC Santa Barbara	W 81–60	7–12 (3–2)	21 – Allman	12 – Rowe	5 – Awosika	Titan Gym (879); Fullerton, CA
January 26, 2019; 7:00 p.m.		at Cal Poly	W 80–63	8–12 (4–2)	18 – Ahmad	9 – Rowe	4 – Awosika	Mott Athletics Center (1,990); San Luis Obispo, CA
January 30, 2019; 7:00 pm, ESPN3		Cal State Northridge	W 78–71	9–12 (5–2)	27 – Ahmad	14 – Rowe	5 – Rowe	Titan Gym (934); Fullerton, CA
February 6, 2019; 7:00 pm, ESPN3		at UC Irvine	L 53–60	9–13 (5–3)	22 – Ahmad	7 – Rowe	2 – Awosika	Bren Events Center (1,383); Irvine, CA
January 9, 2019; 5:00 p.m.		at UC Riverside	W 77–54	10–13 (6–3)	30 – Allman	10 – Rowe	11 – Awosika	SRC Arena (1,076); Riverside, CA
February 13, 2019; 7:00 pm, ESPN3		Long Beach State	W 85–82	11–13 (7–3)	19 – Ahmad	11 – Rowe	7 – Allman	Titan Gym (1,621); Fullerton, CA
February 16, 2019; 7:00 p.m.		at Cal State Northridge	W 78–71	12–13 (8–3)	25 – Allman	7 – Rowe	5 – Allman	Matadome (1,137); Los Angeles, CA
February 21, 2019; 7:30 p.m.		UC Davis	W 62–58	13–13 (9–3)	15 – Ahmad	9 – Rowe	6 – Awosika	Titan Gym (843); Fullerton, CA
February 23, 2019; 7:00 p.m.		at UC Santa Barbara	L 67–82	13–14 (9–4)	27 – Ahmad	5 – Rowe	3 – Allman	The Thunderdome (1,897); Santa Barbara, CA
February 28, 2019; 7:00 p.m., ESPN3		Cal Poly	W 86–75	14–14 (10–4)	25 – Allman	13 – Rowe	4 – Allman	Titan Gym (831); Fullerton, CA
March 2, 2019; 7:00 p.m.		at UC Davis	L 59–66	14–15 (10–5)	18 – Ahmad	11 – Rowe	3 – Awosika	The Pavilion (1,291); Davis, CA
March 9, 2019; 6:30 pm, ESPN3		Hawaii	L 59–71	14–16 (10–6)	16 – Rowe	6 – Awosika	6 – Awosika	Titan Gym (1,369); Fullerton, CA
Big West tournament
March 14, 2019; 2:30 pm, ESPN3	(3)	vs. (6) UC Davis; Quarterfinals	W 75–71 ^{OT}	15–16	32 – Ahmad	8 – Rowe	4 – Rowe	Honda Center (3,656); Anaheim, California
March 15, 2019; 8:59 pm, ESPNU	(3)	vs. (2) UC Santa Barbara; Semifinals	W 64–58	16–16	28 – Ahmad	6 – Ahmad	2 – Clare	Honda Center (4,389); Anaheim, California
March 16, 2019; 8:59 pm, ESPN2	(3)	vs. (1) UC Irvine; Championship	L 64–92	16–17	16 – Allman	5 – Rowe	2 – Rowe	Honda Center (5,867); Anaheim, California
CollegeInsider.com Postseason tournament
March 21, 2019*; 7:00 pm		Cal State Bakersfield; First round – Riley Wallace Classic	L 58–66	16–18	20 – Ahmed/Rowe	11 – Rowe	4 – Clare	Titan Gym (677); Fullerton, CA
*Non-conference game. ^{#}Rankings from AP Poll. (#) Tournament seedings in parentheses. All times are in Pacific.
