= 2018–19 Cal Poly Mustangs men's basketball team =

American college basketball season

2018–19 Cal Poly Mustangs men's basketball
- Conference: Big West Conference
- Record: 6–23 (2–14 Big West)
- Head coach: Joe Callero (10th season)
- Assistant coaches: Mitch Reaves (10th season); Kevon Davis (1st season); David Hanson (1st season); Jamal Johnson (1st season)
- Home arena: Mott Athletics Center (Capacity: 3,032)

2018–19 Big West men's basketball standings
	Conf.				Overall
Team	W		L	PCT	W		L	PCT
UC Irvine †	15	–	1	.938	31	–	6	.838
UC Santa Barbara	10	–	6	.625	22	–	10	.688
Cal State Fullerton	10	–	6	.625	16	–	18	.471
Hawai'i	9	–	7	.563	18	–	13	.581
Long Beach State	8	–	8	.500	15	–	19	.441
UC Davis	7	–	9	.438	11	–	20	.355
Cal State Northridge	7	–	9	.438	13	–	21	.382
UC Riverside	4	–	12	.250	10	–	23	.303
Cal Poly	2	–	14	.125	6	–	23	.207
† 2019 Big West tournament winner

The 2018–19 Cal Poly Mustangs men's basketball team represented California Polytechnic State University in the 2018–19 NCAA Division I men's basketball season. The Mustangs were led by tenth-year head coach Joe Callero and played their home games at the Mott Athletics Center. Cal Poly was a member of the Big West Conference, and participated in their 23rd consecutive season in that league. They finished the season 6–23 overall, 2–14 in Big West play to finish in ninth place. They failed to qualify for the Big West Conference tournament. On March 6, 2019, it was announced that head coach Joe Callero would not be retained after his 10th season. He compiled a record of 126–184 while at Cal Poly.

== Previous season ==
The Mustangs finished 9–22, and 4–12 in the conference. During the season, the Mustangs participated in the Great Alaska Shootout, which was held in Santa Clara, California and Anchorage, Alaska. The Mustangs finished in 3rd place by defeating the College of Charleston but losing to Central Michigan and Idaho. Prior to the tournament, Cal Poly won at Santa Clara as a friendly match. In the postseason, Cal Poly lost to rival UC Santa Barbara in the quarterfinals of the 2018 Big West Conference men's basketball tournament in Anaheim, California.

== Roster ==
2018–19 Cal Poly Mustangs men's basketball team
Players
Coaches

Pos.	#	Name	Height	Weight	Year	Previous school	Hometown
G	1	Job Alexander	6 ft 4 in (1.93 m)	200 lb (91 kg)	Jr	Trinidad State Junior College	Brown Deer, Wisconsin
G	3	Donovan Fields	5 ft 10 in (1.78 m)	160 lb (73 kg)	Sr	Odessa College	Newburgh, New York
G/F	5	Mark Crowe	6 ft 5 in (1.96 m)	205 lb (93 kg)	So	Woodrow Wilson High School	Dallas, Texas
G	10	Jared Roce (redshirt)	5 ft 10 in (1.78 m)	180 lb (82 kg)	RS Fr	Central Catholic High School	Modesto, California
G	11	Marcellus Garrick	6 ft 4 in (1.93 m)	190 lb (86 kg)	Sr	Allan Hancock College	Columbia, South Carolina
F	13	Daxton Carr	6 ft 7 in (2.01 m)	200 lb (91 kg)	Fr	Highland High School	Pocatello, Idaho
F	14	Tuukka Jaakkola	6 ft 10 in (2.08 m)	240 lb (109 kg)	Fr	Helsinki Basketball Academy	Helsinki, Finland
G	22	Colin McCarthy	6 ft 3 in (1.91 m)	190 lb (86 kg)	Fr	Junípero Serra High School	Redwood City, California
F	23	Karlis Garoza	6 ft 9 in (2.06 m)	230 lb (104 kg)	So	Liepāja Secondary School	Saldus, Latvia
G	24	Junior Ballard	6 ft 3 in (1.91 m)	200 lb (91 kg)	Fr	Modesto Christian School	Modesto, California
F	30	Hank Hollingsworth	6 ft 10 in (2.08 m)	235 lb (107 kg)	Jr	Chelan High School	Chelan, Washington
F	31	Nolan Taylor (redshirt)	6 ft 7 in (2.01 m)	260 lb (118 kg)	RS Jr	Pepperdine	Keller, Texas
F	33	Kyle Colvin	6 ft 6 in (1.98 m)	200 lb (91 kg)	Fr	Mission College Preparatory High School	San Luis Obispo, California
G/F	35	Jakub Niziol	6 ft 7 in (2.01 m)	210 lb (95 kg)	Sr	Howard College	Wrocław, Poland

Head coach

- Joe Callero (Central Washington)

Assistant coach(es)

- Mitch Reaves (Washington State)
- Kevon Davis (West Chester)
- David Hanson (Cal Poly)
- Jamal Johnson (Cal Poly)

Legend

- (C) Team captain
- (S) Suspended
- (I) Ineligible
- (W) Walk-on
- Injured
- Current redshirt

Roster
Last update: 15 August 2018

== Schedule ==
Date time, TV	Opponent	Result	Record	High points	High rebounds	High assists	Site (attendance) city, state
Non–conference regular season
November 7, 2018*; 7:05 pm	Menlo College	W 82–75	1–0	30 – Fields	12 – Niziol	8 – Niziol	Mott Athletics Center (1,121); San Luis Obispo, CA
November 11, 2018*; 2:00 pm, P12N	at Arizona	L 61–82	1–1	16 – Garrick	5 – Crowe	2 – Tied	McKale Center (13,995); Tucson, AZ
November 16, 2018*	at Sacramento State	Cancelled					The Nest; Sacramento, CA
November 19, 2018*; 6:00 pm	at Washington State	L 70–84	1–2	22 – Fields	5 – Tied	7 – Fields	Beasley Coliseum (1,774); Pullman, WA
November 21, 2018*; 4:30pm	vs. Texas State; Portland Classic	L 42–54	1–3	11 – Fields	6 – Garoza	3 – Fields	Chiles Center; Portland, OR
November 23, 2018*; 7:00pm	at Portland; Portland Classic	L 67–72	1–4	13 – Jaakkola	7 – Niziol	3 – Tied	Chiles Center (1,320); Portland, OR
November 24, 2018*; 2:30pm	vs. USC Upstate; Portland Classic	W 75–74 ^{OT}	2–4	21 – Fields	12 – Hollingsworth	7 – Fields	Chiles Center; Portland, OR
December 1, 2018*; 12:00pm	at Fresno State	L 67–76	2–5	22 – Crowe	10 – Carr	4 – Fields	Save Mart Center (4,724); Fresno, CA
December 8, 2018*; 7:00pm	Bethune–Cookman	W 80–78 ^{OT}	3–5	28 – Fields	7 – Hollingsworth	4 – Fields	Mott Athletics Center (1,326); San Luis Obispo, CA
December 15, 2018*; 7:00 pm, P12N	at California	L 66–67	3–6	26 – Fields	8 – Hollingsworth	3 – Fields	Haas Pavilion (3,907); Berkeley, CA
December 18, 2018*; 7:00pm, ESPN3	at Cal State Bakersfield	L 61–74	3–7	21 – Ballard	6 – Ballard	5 – Fields	Icardo Center (1,987); Bakersfield, CA
December 21, 2018*; 7:00pm	UT Arlington	L 70–75 ^{OT}	3–8	18 – Tied	7 – Ballard	4 – Alexander	Mott Athletics Center (1,515); San Luis Obispo, CA
December 29, 2018*; 11:00am, ESPN+	at Siena	L 54–75	3–9	13 – Crowe	6 – Carr	7 – Fields	Times Union Center (5,768); Albany, NY
January 4, 2019*; 7:00pm	Holy Names	W 68–47	4–9	19 – Garrick	8 – Garoza	6 – Fields	Mott Athletics Center (1,242); San Luis Obispo, CA
Big West regular season
January 9, 2019; 7:00pm	at UC Santa Barbara; Rivalry	L 56–65	4–10 (0–1)	19 – Fields	5 – Niziol	8 – Fields	The Thunderdome (4,816); Santa Barbara, CA
January 12, 2019; 7:00pm	Cal State Northridge	L 74–78 ^{OT}	4–11 (0–2)	30 – Fields	10 – Niziol	7 – Fields	Mott Athletics Center (2,513); San Luis Obispo, CA
January 19, 2019; 5:00 p.m.	at UC Davis; Rivalry	L 63–75	4–12 (0–3)	16 – Crowe	5 – Carr	5 – Fields	The Pavilion (2,090); Davis, CA
January 23, 2019; 7:00pm	UC Riverside	L 51–74	4–13 (0–4)	15 – Fields	4 – Fields	4 – Fields	Mott Athletics Center (1,622); San Luis Obispo, CA
January 26, 2019; 7:00pm	Cal State Fullerton	L 63–80	4–14 (0–5)	15 – Niziol	7 – Niziol	3 – Fields	Mott Athletics Center (1,990); San Luis Obispo, CA
January 31, 2019; 7:00 pm, ESPN3	at UC Riverside	W 71–45	5–14 (1–5)	18 – Garrick	7 – Crowe	6 – Alexander	SRC Arena (780); Riverside, CA
February 2, 2019; 7:00pm	at Cal State Northridge	L 65–83	5–15 (1–6)	12 – Garrick	10 – Crowe	4 – Fields	Matadome (1,393); Los Angeles, California
February 7, 2019; 7:00pm	UC Davis; Rivalry	L 53–63	5–16 (1–7)	17 – Fields	6 – Crowe	3 – Fields	Mott Athletics Center (1,498); San Luis Obispo, CA
February 9, 2019; 7:00pm	Long Beach State	L 68–76 ^{OT}	5–17 (1–8)	23 – Fields	12 – Garoza	3 – Crowe	Mott Athletics Center (1,970); San Luis Obispo, CA
February 14, 2019; 10:00pm, Spectrum HI	at Hawaii	L 54–75	5–18 (1–9)	15 – Garrick	6 – Crowe	4 – Fields	Stan Sheriff Center (4,995); Honolulu, HI
February 21, 2019; 7:00pm	at UC Irvine	L 47–74	5–19 (1–10)	12 – Fields	5 – Carr	2 – Fields	Bren Events Center (1,396); Irvine, CA
February 23, 2019; 7:00pm	Hawaii	W 88–80	6–19 (2–10)	28 – Fields	7 – Garoza	4 – Fields	Mott Athletics Center (2,310); San Luis Obispo, CA
February 28, 2019; 7:00pm, ESPN3	at Cal State Fullerton	L 75–86	6–20 (2–11)	22 – Fields	8 – Alexander	2 – Fields	Titan Gym (831); Fullerton, CA
March 2, 2019; 7:00 pm, ESPN3	at Long Beach State	L 85–94	6–21 (2–12)	30 – Garrick	10 – Garoza	3 – Alexander	Walter Pyramid (2,172); Long Beach, CA
March 7, 2019; 7:00pm	UC Irvine	L 72–110	6–22 (2–13)	27 – Garrick	6 – Garoza	5 – Fields	Mott Athletics Center (1,932); San Luis Obispo, CA
March 9, 2019; 7:00pm	UC Santa Barbara; Rivalry	L 82–92	6–23 (2–14)	23 – Fields	10 – Crowe	4 – Fields	Mott Athletics Center (2,713); San Luis Obispo, CA
*Non-conference game. ^{#}Rankings from AP Poll. (#) Tournament seedings in parentheses. All times are in Pacific.
