= 2018–19 UC Irvine Anteaters men's basketball team =

American college basketball season

2018–19 UC Irvine Anteaters men's basketball

Big West regular season champions Big West tournament champions

NCAA tournament, Second Round
- Conference: Big West Conference
- Record: 31–6 (15–1 Big West)
- Head coach: Russell Turner (9th season)
- Assistant coaches: Blaine Taylor; Ryan Badrtalei; Michael Wilder; Pat Flesher
- Home arena: Bren Events Center (Capacity: 5,000)

2018–19 Big West men's basketball standings
	Conf.				Overall
Team	W		L	PCT	W		L	PCT
UC Irvine †	15	–	1	.938	31	–	6	.838
UC Santa Barbara	10	–	6	.625	22	–	10	.688
Cal State Fullerton	10	–	6	.625	16	–	18	.471
Hawai'i	9	–	7	.563	18	–	13	.581
Long Beach State	8	–	8	.500	15	–	19	.441
UC Davis	7	–	9	.438	11	–	20	.355
Cal State Northridge	7	–	9	.438	13	–	21	.382
UC Riverside	4	–	12	.250	10	–	23	.303
Cal Poly	2	–	14	.125	6	–	23	.207
† 2019 Big West tournament winner

The 2018–19 UC Irvine Anteaters men's basketball team represented the University of California, Irvine in the 2018–19 NCAA Division I men's basketball season. The Anteaters were led by ninth-year head coach Russell Turner competing in the Bren Events Center. UC Irvine is a member of the Big West Conference, and participated in their 41st consecutive season in that league. The team finished the season with many new records that included a new school record of 31-6, longest game winning streak (17), and first ever NCAA Tournament win over Kansas State in the South Region 1st Round before falling to Oregon in the 2nd Round. Jonathan Galloway became the new program record holder of rebounds (969), career games won (95), career games played (146). Max Hazzard broke the Bren Events Center record for most three pointers made in a game on December 15 against Denver (10) and the team broke the school record for most threes made in a game that night with 18. Evan Leonard set a school record of 44 consecutive free throws made that ended in the NCAA Tournament 2nd Round vs Oregon. The team finished 2nd in the 2018 Asia-Pacific University Basketball Challenge prior to the season and the 2019 Gulf Coast Showcase during the regular season. The team won its 4th regular season title in 6 seasons on March 2, 2019 in a win over UC Riverside. The team won its second Big West tournament title with wins over UC Riverside, Long Beach State, and Cal State Fullerton.

== Previous season ==
The Anteaters finished the season 18–17 overall, and 11–5 in the conference. During the season, the Anteaters participated in the Las Vegas Invitational, which was held in Manhattan, Kansas, Tempe, Arizona, and Paradise, Nevada. UC Irvine finished 7th place by defeating Northern Arizona and losing to Rider. Prior to the tournament, UC Irvine lost at Kansas State and at Arizona State. UC Irvine also defeated Idaho in the Vandal Holiday Hoops Classic in Boise, Idaho. In the postseason, UC Irvine defeated Hawaii and UC Santa Barbara but lost to Cal State Fullerton in the championship of the 2018 Big West Conference men's basketball tournament in Anaheim, California.

The Anteaters competed from August 5 through August 12 in the 2018 Asia-Pacific University Basketball Challenge, hosted by the KBA and Yonsei University. This is the 5th edition of the tournament and UC Irvine is the 1st NCAA Division I school invited. Gonzaga were the original invitees but could not make the tournament and they along with the KBA offered the spot to UC Irvine. In the competition, UC Irvine faced hosts Yonsei University, De La Salle University from the Philippines, the Japanese national university team, the Chinese Taipei national university selection team, and the Russian national university team in a round-robin format. The competition was played under FIBA rules, which differ from NCAA rules. UC Irvine was defeated in the final game of the round robin tournament to Russia 92–91. Both teams had a 4–1 record, but Russia took the Gold Medal by winning the head-to-head match up.

Incoming freshman Aiden Krause did not partake in this tournament as he represented the Australia U-18 team in the 2018 FIBA Asia U-18 Championship in the same period. Australia won the competition and qualified for the 2019 FIBA Under-19 Basketball World Cup.

== Roster ==
2018–19 UC Irvine Anteaters men's basketball team
Players
Coaches

Pos.	#	Name	Height	Weight	Year	Previous school	Hometown
F	0	JC Butler (W)	6 ft 5 in (1.96 m)	200 lb (91 kg)	Fr	Prairie School	Racine, Wisconsin
G	1	Devin Cole (W) (redshirt)	5 ft 11 in (1.8 m)	170 lb (77 kg)	Fr	Buena High School	Ventura, California
G	2	Max Hazzard	5 ft 10 in (1.78 m)	170 lb (77 kg)	RS Jr	Loyola High School	Los Angeles, California
G	3	Robert Cartwright	6 ft 2 in (1.88 m)	180 lb (82 kg)	GS	Stanford	Pasadena, California
G	4	Aiden Krause (redshirt)	6 ft 4 in (1.93 m)	198 lb (90 kg)	Fr	Australian Institute of Sport	Mackay, QLD, Australia
F	5	Jonathan Galloway (C)	6 ft 10 in (2.08 m)	235 lb (107 kg)	GS	Salesian High School	Brentwood, California
F	11	John Edgar Jr.	6 ft 5 in (1.96 m)	217 lb (98 kg)	Jr	Ayala High School	Chino Hills, California
G	14	Evan Leonard	6 ft 1 in (1.85 m)	190 lb (86 kg)	Jr	Cerritos High School	Cerritos, California
G	23	Darrian Traylor	6 ft 4 in (1.93 m)	210 lb (95 kg)	RS Jr	Centennial High School	Las Vegas, Nevada
G	24	Eyassu Worku	6 ft 2 in (1.88 m)	170 lb (77 kg)	Jr	Los Alamitos High School	Artesia, California
G	25	Spencer Rivers (W)	6 ft 2 in (1.88 m)	200 lb (91 kg)	Sr	Winter Park High School	Winter Park, Florida
C	35	Solomon Ruddell	7 ft 1 in (2.16 m)	255 lb (116 kg)	So	The Hill School	Los Osos, California
F	40	Collin Welp	6 ft 9 in (2.06 m)	235 lb (107 kg)	So	Seattle Preparatory School	Seattle, Washington
F	42	Tommy Rutherford	6 ft 8 in (2.03 m)	220 lb (100 kg)	Jr	Grossmont High School	El Cajon, California
F	50	Elston Jones	6 ft 9 in (2.06 m)	275 lb (125 kg)	RS Sr	Utah State	Goodyear, Arizona
C	55	Brad Greene (redshirt)	6 ft 10 in (2.08 m)	320 lb (145 kg)	Jr	Lone Pine High School	Lone Pine, California

Head coach

- Russell Turner (Hampden–Sydney)

Assistant coach(es)

- Blaine Taylor (Montana)
- Ryan Badrtalei (UCLA)
- Michael Wilder (UC Irvine)

Legend

- (C) Team captain
- (S) Suspended
- (I) Ineligible
- (W) Walk-on
- Injured
- Current redshirt

Roster
Last update: July 19, 2018

== Schedule ==
Date time, TV	Rank^{#}	Opponent^{#}	Result	Record	High points	High rebounds	High assists	Site (attendance) city, state
2018 Asia-Pacific University Basketball Challenge
August 5, 2018*; 1:30 am, Naver TV		at South Korea	W 92–90 ^{OT}	1–0	18 – Edgar Jr.	10 – Jones	5 – Cartwright	Jamsil Students' Gymnasium; Seoul, South Korea
August 6, 2018*; 11:00 pm, Naver TV		vs. Japan U22	W 104–58	2–0	18 – Welp	18 – Greene	7 – Worku	Jamsil Students' Gymnasium; Seoul, South Korea
August 7, 2018*; 9:00 pm, Naver TV		vs. Philippines	W 102–58	3–0	22 – Edgar Jr.	11 – Jones	10 – Cartwright	Jamsil Students' Gymnasium; Seoul, South Korea
August 10, 2018*; 11:00 pm, Naver TV		vs. Chinese Taipei U22	W 81–72	4–0	18 – Tied	14 – Tied	6 – Worku	Jamsil Students' Gymnasium; Seoul, South Korea
August 12, 2018*; 1:30 am, Naver TV		vs. Russia U22; Gold Medal Game	L 91–92	4–1	17 – Butler	11 – Rutherford	9 – Worku	Jamsil Students' Gymnasium; Seoul, South Korea
Exhibition
November 2, 2018*; 7:00 pm		La Verne	W 112–57		20 – Worku	9 – Jones	11 – Cartwright	Bren Events Center (771); Irvine, California
Non-conference regular season
November 6, 2018*; 7:00 pm, Big West TV		Idaho	W 86–68	1–0	18 – Worku	9 – Tied	6 – Worku	Bren Events Center (1,058); Irvine, California
November 9, 2018*; 6:30 pm, SEC+		at Texas A&M	W 74–73	2–0	19 – Hazzard	8 – Galloway	6 – Worku	Reed Arena (7,689); College Station, TX
November 12, 2018*; 7:00 pm, Big West TV		Life Pacific College; Gulf Coast Showcase Regional Campus Game	W 87–53	3–0	15 – Tied	14 – Galloway	5 – Edgar Jr.	Bren Events Center (814); Irvine, CA
November 15, 2018*; 7:00 pm, TheW.TV		at Santa Clara	W 61–49	4–0	12 – Welp	8 – Jones	3 – Tied	Leavey Center (1,304); Santa Clara, CA
November 19, 2018*; 10:30 am		vs. UTSA; Gulf Coast Showcase Quarterfinals	W 65–56	5–0	17 – Cartwright	7 – Tied	2 – Tied	Hertz Arena (338); Estero, Florida
November 20, 2018*; 2:00 pm		vs. Tulane; Gulf Coast Showcase Semifinals	W 67–55	6–0	15 – Welp	12 – Galloway	4 – Tied	Hertz Arena (498); Estero, Florida
November 21, 2018*; 4:30 pm		vs. Toledo; Gulf Coast Showcase Championship	L 60–67	6–1	16 – Edgar Jr.	11 – Galloway	3 – Cartwright	Hertz Arena (1,031); Estero, Florida
November 28, 2018*; 7:00 pm, TheW.TV		at Saint Mary's	W 80–75	7–1	22 – Leonard	6 – Rutherford	2 – Tied	McKeon Pavilion (2,511); Moraga, CA
December 1, 2018*; 7:00 pm, Big West TV		Utah State	L 65–89	7–2	11 – Worku	5 – Galloway	3 – Worku	Bren Events Center (1,812); Irvine, CA
December 5, 2018*; 7:00 pm, WAC Digital		at California Baptist	W 69–66	8–2	14 – Rutherford	10 – Galloway	3 – Hazzard	CBU Events Center (2,833); Riverside, CA
December 8, 2018*; 7:00 pm, Big West TV		Montana	W 60–51	9–2	18 – Leonard	7 – Tied	3 – Hazzard	Bren Events Center (1,237); Irvine, CA
December 15, 2018*; 7:00 pm, Big West TV		Denver	W 86–52	10–2	32 – Hazzard	7 – Jones	7 – Worku	Bren Events Center (2,371); Irvine, CA
December 19, 2018*; 4:00 pm, ESPN+		at Eastern Michigan	W 52–48	11–2	14 – Hazzard	10 – Tied	2 – Tied	Convocation Center (1,187); Ypsilanti, MI
December 21, 2018*; 3:30 pm, FS1		at Butler	L 54–71	11–3	8 – Rutherford	7 – Galloway	2 – Galloway	Hinkle Fieldhouse (7,732); Indianapolis, IN
December 29, 2018*; 7:00 pm, TheW.TV		at Pacific	L 75–84 ^{OT}	11–4	28 – Hazzard	12 – Jones	3 – Cartwright	Alex G. Spanos Center (1,425); Stockton, CA
January 3, 2019*; 7:00 pm, Big West TV		UTRGV	W 85–74	12–4	23 – Hazzard	11 – Jones	7 – Worku	Bren Events Center (1,694); Irvine, CA
Big West regular season
January 10, 2019; 7:00 pm, ESPN3		UC Davis	W 71–69 ^{OT}	13–4 (1–0)	22 – Leonard	10 – Galloway	8 – Cartwright	Bren Events Center (1,680); Irvine, CA
January 12, 2019; 7:00 pm, Big West TV		at Cal State Fullerton	W 63–46	14–4 (2–0)	12 – Welp	11 – Galloway	2 – Tied	Titan Gym (1,347); Fullerton, CA
January 16, 2019; 7:00 pm, ESPN3		Long Beach State; Black&Blue Rivalry	L 70–80	14–5 (2–1)	16 – Leonard	14 – Galloway	4 – Tied	Bren Events Center (1,530); Irvine, CA
January 19, 2019; 3:00 pm, Big West TV		at Cal State Northridge	W 74–68	15–5 (3–1)	17 – Worku	9 – Jones	2 – Worku	Matadome (947); Los Angeles, CA
January 24, 2019; 10:00 pm, Spectrum Sports HI		at Hawaii	W 75–74 ^{OT}	16–5 (4–1)	17 – Leonard	9 – Galloway	4 – Hazzard	Stan Sheriff Center (5,602); Honolulu, HI
January 26, 2019; 7:00 pm, ESPN3		UC Riverside	W 82–64	17–5 (5–1)	14 – Jones	10 – Galloway	6 – Worku	Bren Events Center (1,725); Irvine, CA
January 31, 2019; 8:00 pm, ESPNU		at UC Santa Barbara	W 66–62 ^{OT}	18–5 (6–1)	15 – Hazzard	9 – Rutherford	3 – Tied	The Thunderdome (2,842); Santa Barbara, CA
February 2, 2019; 7:00 pm, Big West TV		at Long Beach State; Black&Blue Rivalry	W 82–80	19–5 (7–1)	18 – Leonard	7 – Welp	4 – Tied	Walter Pyramid (2,344); Long Beach, CA
February 6, 2019; 7:00 pm, ESPN3		Cal State Fullerton	W 60–53	20–5 (8–1)	19 – Hazzard	11 – Galloway	4 – Worku	Bren Events Center (1,383); Irvine, CA
February 9, 2019; 7:00 pm, ESPN3		Hawaii; Homecoming	W 67–56	21–5 (9–1)	13 – Hazzard	13 – Galloway	7 – Worku	Bren Events Center (3,524); Irvine, CA
February 16, 2019; 9:00 pm, ESPN2		UC Santa Barbara	W 83–70	22–5 (10–1)	23 – Leonard	11 – Galloway	2 – Tied	Bren Events Center (2,087); Irvine, CA
February 21, 2019; 7:00 pm, ESPN3		Cal Poly	W 74–47	23–5 (11–1)	14 – Tied	8 – Welp	5 – Hazzard	Bren Events Center (1,396); Irvine, CA
February 28, 2019; 8:00 pm, ESPNU		at UC Davis	W 64–48	24–5 (12–1)	12 – Jones	12 – Jones	3 – Worku	The Pavilion (3,777); Davis, CA
March 2, 2019; 5:00 pm, Big West TV		at UC Riverside	W 68–47	25–5 (13–1)	14 – Leonard	11 – Galloway	4 – Hazzard	SRC Arena (686); Riverside, CA
March 7, 2019; 7:00 pm, Big West TV		at Cal Poly	W 110–72	26–5 (14–1)	19 – Welp	8 – Jones	8 – Hazzard	Mott Athletics Center (1,932); San Luis Obispo, CA
March 9, 2019; 7:30 pm, ESPN3/KDOC-TV		Cal State Northridge	W 86–74	27–5 (15–1)	17 – Leonard	11 – Galloway	5 – Hazzard	Bren Events Center (3,018); Irvine, CA
Big West tournament
March 14, 2019; 6:00 pm, ESPN3	(1)	vs. (8) UC Riverside; Quarterfinals	W 63–44	28–5	15 – Welp	7 – Welp	5 – Cartwright	Honda Center (3,656); Anaheim, California
March 15, 2019; 6:30 pm, ESPN3	(1)	vs. (5) Long Beach State; Semifinals/Rivalry	W 75–67	29–5	17 – Cartwright	7 – Jones	2 – Tied	Honda Center (4,389); Anaheim, California
March 16, 2019; 8:59 pm, ESPN2	(1)	vs. (3) Cal State Fullerton; Championship	W 92–64	30–5	23 – Tied	5 – Tied	5 – Hazzard	Honda Center (5,867); Anaheim, California
NCAA tournament
March 22, 2019*; 11:00 am, TBS	(13 S)	vs. (4 S) No. 18 Kansas State; First Round	W 70–64	31–5	19 – Tied	6 – Leonard	4 – Leonard	SAP Center (14,331); San Jose, CA
March 24, 2019*; 6:40 pm, TBS	(13 S)	vs. (12 S) Oregon; Second Round	L 54–73	31–6	14 – Cartwright	11 – Galloway	2 – Tied	SAP Center (14,802); San Jose, CA
*Non-conference game. ^{#}Rankings from AP Poll. (#) Tournament seedings in parentheses. S=South. All times are in Pacific.
