= 2018–19 UC Santa Barbara Gauchos men's basketball team =

American college basketball season

2018–19 UC Santa Barbara Gauchos men's basketball
- Conference: Big West Conference
- Record: 22–10 (10–6 Big West)
- Head coach: Joe Pasternack (2nd season)
- Assistant coaches: John Rillie; Louis Reynaud; Ben Tucker
- Home arena: The Thunderdome (Capacity: 5,600)

2018–19 Big West men's basketball standings
	Conf.				Overall
Team	W		L	PCT	W		L	PCT
UC Irvine †	15	–	1	.938	31	–	6	.838
UC Santa Barbara	10	–	6	.625	22	–	10	.688
Cal State Fullerton	10	–	6	.625	16	–	18	.471
Hawai'i	9	–	7	.563	18	–	13	.581
Long Beach State	8	–	8	.500	15	–	19	.441
UC Davis	7	–	9	.438	11	–	20	.355
Cal State Northridge	7	–	9	.438	13	–	21	.382
UC Riverside	4	–	12	.250	10	–	23	.303
Cal Poly	2	–	14	.125	6	–	23	.207
† 2019 Big West tournament winner

The 2018–19 UC Santa Barbara Guachos men's basketball team represented the University of California, Santa Barbara in the 2018–19 NCAA Division I men's basketball season. The Gauchos were led by second-year head coach Joe Pasternack and competed in The Thunderdome. UC Santa Barbara was a member of the Big West Conference, and participated in their 48th season in that league.

== Before the season ==
The Gauchos finished the season 23–9 overall, and 11–5 in the conference. During the season, the Gauchos participated in the Legends Classic under the subregionals division, which was held in Pittsburgh, Pennsylvania, College Station, Texas, and Las Vegas, Nevada. The Gauchos finished as champions by defeating Pepperdine and Montana. Prior to the tournament, UC Santa Barbara lost at Pittsburgh and at Texas A&M as friendly matches. In the postseason, UC Santa Barbara defeated rival Cal Poly but lost to UC Irvine in the semifinals of the 2018 Big West Conference men's basketball tournament in Anaheim, California.

== Roster ==
2018–19 UC Santa Barbara Gauchos men's basketball team
Players
Coaches

Pos.	#	Name	Height	Weight	Year	Previous school	Hometown
G	0	Sékou Touré	6 ft 5 in (1.96 m)	190 lb (86 kg)	Fr	Coliseum College Prep Academy	Conakry, Guinea
G	1	Ar'mond Davis	6 ft 6 in (1.98 m)	193 lb (88 kg)	GS	Alabama	Tacoma, Washington
F	2	Jarriesse Blackmon	6 ft 7 in (2.01 m)	211 lb (96 kg)	Sr	Layton High School	Layton, Utah
G	3	JaQuori McLaughlin	6 ft 4 in (1.93 m)	185 lb (84 kg)	So	Oregon State	Tacoma, Washington
G	4	Devearl Ramsey	5 ft 10 in (1.78 m)	170 lb (77 kg)	So	Nevada	Los Angeles, California
F	5	Jay Nagle	6 ft 7 in (2.01 m)	165 lb (75 kg)	Fr	Wood High School	Vacaville, California
F	10	Maxwell Kupchak	6 ft 7 in (2.01 m)	201 lb (91 kg)	Sr	Brentwood School	Los Angeles, California
F	12	Amadou Sow	6 ft 9 in (2.06 m)	225 lb (102 kg)	Fr	Coliseum College Prep Academy	Bamako, Mali
G	13	Mateen Hirbod	6 ft 1 in (1.85 m)	195 lb (88 kg)	So	Houston	Danville, California
F	14	Ami Lakoju	6 ft 9 in (2.06 m)	265 lb (120 kg)	Sr	St. Luke's School	New York, New York
G	15	Mobeen Hirbod	6 ft 1 in (1.85 m)	160 lb (73 kg)	Fr	Bentley School	Danville, California
G	21	Max Heidegger	6 ft 2 in (1.88 m)	181 lb (82 kg)	Jr	Oaks Christian School	Malibu, California
G	23	Christian Terrell	6 ft 5 in (1.96 m)	195 lb (88 kg)	Jr	Sacramento Charter High School	Sacramento, California
G	34	Zack Moore	6 ft 5 in (1.96 m)	200 lb (91 kg)	Jr	Seattle	Bellevue, Washington
F	35	Robinson Idehen	6 ft 10 in (2.08 m)	225 lb (102 kg)	So	Trinity Valley Community College	London, England
F	40	Andrew Pickles	6 ft 8 in (2.03 m)	225 lb (102 kg)	Jr	Mercer Island High School	Seattle, Washington
G	—	Brandon Cyrus (redshirt)	6 ft 5 in (1.96 m)	190 lb (86 kg)	RS Jr	DePaul	Oakville, Canada

Head coach

- Joe Pasternack (Indiana)

Assistant coach(es)

- John Rillie (Gonzaga)
- Louis Reynaud (San Francisco State)
- Ben Tucker (Arizona)

Legend

- (C) Team captain
- (S) Suspended
- (I) Ineligible
- (W) Walk-on
- Injured
- Current redshirt

Roster
Last update: 13 August 2018

== Schedule ==
Date time, TV	Rank^{#}	Opponent^{#}	Result	Record	High points	High rebounds	High assists	Site (attendance) city, state
Non–conference regular season
November 6, 2018*; 7:00 pm, ATTSNRM		at Wyoming	W 76–66	1–0	17 – McLaughlin	11 – Sow	4 – Ramsey	Arena-Auditorium (3,373); Laramie, WY
November 11, 2018*; 1:00 pm, ESPN+		at North Dakota State	L 63–82	1-1	13 – Ramsey	6 – Terrell	2 – McLaughlin	Scheels Center (1,962); Fargo, ND
November 13, 2018*; 7:00 pm, Big West TV		Cal Lutheran	W 88-32	2-1	16 – Lakoju	8 – Touré	7 – Moore	The Thunderdome; Santa Barbara, CA
November 17, 2018*; 2:00 pm, Big West TV		Montana State	W 88-69	3-1	22 – Davis	8 – Sow	8 – Ramsey	The Thunderdome (2,387); Santa Barbara, CA
November 23, 2018*; 4:00 pm		vs. Portland State; Vandal Holiday Hoops Classic	W 76-69	4-1	20 – Davis	9 – Blackmon	5 – McLaughlin	CenturyLink Arena; Boise, ID
November 24, 2018*; 6:00 pm		vs. Idaho; Vandal Holiday Hoops Classic	W 66-55	5-1	18 – Davis	10 – Blackmon	5 – McLaughlin	CenturyLink Arena; Boise, ID
November 29, 2018*; 7:00 pm, Big West TV		Sacramento State	W 75-58	6-1	14 – Tied	6 – Tied	4 – Ramsey	The Thunderdome (1,516); Santa Barbara, CA
December 2, 2018*; 5:00 pm, P12N		at Washington	L 63-67	6-2	20 – Davis	10 – Davis	5 – Nowell	Alaska Airlines Arena (6,533); Seattle, WA
December 8, 2018*; 7:00 pm		UAPB	W 55-45	7-2	12 – Sow	11 – Sow	5 – McLaughlin	The Thunderdome (1,582); Santa Barbara, CA
December 15, 2018*; 12:00 pm, ESPN+		at Rice	W 99-89 ^{OT}	8-2	22 – Tied	6 – Tied	4 – McLaughlin	Tudor Fieldhouse (2,000); Houston, TX
December 19, 2018*; 5:00 pm		at Omaha	L 74–85	8–3	26 – Davis	9 – Sow	3 – Ramsey	Baxter Arena (1,817); Omaha, NE
December 22, 2018*; 2:00 pm		Idaho State	W 84–65	9–3	19 – Davis	5 – Blackmon	8 – Heidegger	The Thunderdome (1,214); Santa Barbara, CA
December 29, 2018*; 7:00 pm		San Francisco	W 73–71	10–3	21 – Sow	9 – Sow	6 – Ramsey	The Thunderdome (1,712); Santa Barbara, CA
January 2, 2019*; 7:00 pm		Bethesda University	W 109–47	11–3	20 – Nagle	11 – Lakoju	6 – Terrell	The Thunderdome (846); Santa Barbara, CA
Big West regular season
January 9, 2019; 7:00 pm		Cal Poly; Rivalry	W 65–56	12–3 (1–0)	19 – Ramsey	8 – Idehen	3 – Ramsey	The Thunderdome (4,816); Santa Barbara, CA
January 12, 2019; 7:00 pm		UC Riverside	W 72–64	13–3 (2–0)	22 – Sow	9 – Sow	5 – McLaughlin	The Thunderdome (1,526); Santa Barbara, CA
January 17, 2019; 7:00 p.m.		at UC Davis	W 69–58	14–3 (3–0)	23 – Davis	8 – Davis	2 – Davis	The Pavilion (3,189); Davis, CA
January 24, 2019; 7:00 p.m.		at Cal State Fullerton	L 60–81	14–4 (3–1)	16 – Ramsey	8 – McLaughlin	4 – Ramsey	Titan Gym (879); Fullerton, CA
January 26, 2019; 7:00 pm, ESPN3		at Long Beach State	W 82–71	15–4 (4–1)	24 – Davis	11 – Davis	6 – Heidegger	Walter Pyramid (2,333); Long Beach, CA
January 31, 2019; 8:00 pm, ESPNU		UC Irvine	L 62–66 ^{OT}	15–5 (4–2)	13 – Sow	7 – Blackmon	4 – Heidegger	The Thunderdome (2,842); Santa Barbara, CA
February 2, 2019; 10:00 pm, Spectrum HI		at Hawaii	W 75–54	16–5 (5–2)	20 – Sow	11 – Sow	6 – Ramsey	Stan Sheriff Center (6,060); Honolulu, HI
February 6, 2019; 7:00 p.m.		Cal State Northridge	W 70–64	17–5 (6–2)	26 – Heidegger	9 – Sow	4 – Blackmon	The Thunderdome (1,334); Santa Barbara, CA
February 9, 2019; 9:00 pm, ESPNU		UC Davis	L 57–61	17–6 (6–3)	11 – Heidegger	7 – Sow	5 – Heidegger	The Thunderdome (2,316); Santa Barbara, CA
February 14, 2019; 7:00 pm, ESPN3		at UC Riverside	L 57–71	17–7 (6–4)	14 – Davis	6 – Davis	2 – McLaughlin	SRC Arena (466); Riverside, CA
February 16, 2019; 9:00 pm, ESPN2		at UC Irvine	L 70–83	17–8 (6–5)	17 – Heidegger	6 – Ramsey	3 – Heidegger	Bren Events Center (2,087); Irvine, CA
February 21, 2019; 8:00 pm, ESPNU		Hawaii	W 79–61	18–8 (7–5)	18 – Sow	8 – Sow	8 – McLaughlin	The Thunderdome (1,877); Santa Barbara, CA
February 23, 2019; 7:00 p.m.		Cal State Fullerton	W 82–67	19–8 (8–5)	19 – Heidegger	7 – Davis	7 – McLaughlin	The Thunderdome (1,897); Santa Barbara, CA
February 28, 2019; 7:00 p.m.		Long Beach State	L 64–69	19–9 (8–6)	17 – Heidegger	15 – Sow	5 – McLaughlin	The Thunderdome (3,118); Santa Barbara, CA
March 7, 2019; 7:00 pm, ESPN3		at Cal State Northridge	W 76–74	20–9 (9–6)	23 – Heidegger	8 – Heidegger	3 – Heidegger	Matadome (1,993); Los Angeles, CA
March 9, 2019; 7:00 p.m.		at Cal Poly; Rivalry	W 92–82	21–9 (10–6)	23 – Sow	17 – Davis	5 – Ramsey	Mott Athletics Center (2,713); San Luis Obispo, CA
Big West tournament
March 14, 2019; 12:00 pm, ESPN3	(2)	vs. (7) Cal State Northridge; Quarterfinals	W 71–68	22–9	19 – Davis	11 – Sow	2 – McLaughlin	Honda Center (3,656); Anaheim, California
March 15, 2019; 8:59 pm, ESPNU	(2)	vs. (3) Cal State Fullerton; Semifinals	L 58–64	22–10	14 – Heidegger	7 – Davis	2 – Blackmon	Honda Center (4,389); Anaheim, California
*Non-conference game. ^{#}Rankings from AP Poll. (#) Tournament seedings in parentheses. All times are in Pacific.
