= 2019 Big West Conference men's basketball tournament =

- Classification: Division I
- Season: 2018–19
- Teams: 8
- Site: Honda Center; Anaheim, California
- Champions: UC Irvine (2nd title)
- Winning coach: Russell Turner (2nd title)
- MVP: Max Hazzard (UC Irvine)
- Television: ESPN3; ESPNU; ESPN2

2018–19 Big West men's basketball standings
	Conf.				Overall
Team	W		L	PCT	W		L	PCT
UC Irvine †	15	–	1	.938	31	–	6	.838
UC Santa Barbara	10	–	6	.625	22	–	10	.688
Cal State Fullerton	10	–	6	.625	16	–	18	.471
Hawai'i	9	–	7	.563	18	–	13	.581
Long Beach State	8	–	8	.500	15	–	19	.441
UC Davis	7	–	9	.438	11	–	20	.355
Cal State Northridge	7	–	9	.438	13	–	21	.382
UC Riverside	4	–	12	.250	10	–	23	.303
Cal Poly	2	–	14	.125	6	–	23	.207
† 2019 Big West tournament winner

The 2019 Big West Conference men's basketball tournament was the postseason men's basketball tournament for the Big West Conference of the 2018–19 NCAA Division I men's basketball season. It was held from March 14 through March 16, 2019 at the Honda Center in Anaheim, California. UC Irvine defeated Cal State Fullerton 92–64 in the championship game to win the tournament, and received the conference's automatic bid to the NCAA tournament. The championship was the second for UC Irvine in the Big West, last winning it in 2015.

== Seeds ==
The top eight conference teams were eligible for the tournament. Teams were seeded by record within the conference, with a tiebreaker system to seed teams with identical conference records. Teams were reseeded after the quarterfinals.

Seed	School	Conference	Tiebreaker
1	UC Irvine	15–1	
2	UC Santa Barbara	10–6	2–0 vs Hawaii
3	Cal State Fullerton	10–6	0–2 vs Hawaii
4	Hawaii	9–7	
5	Long Beach State	8–8	
6	UC Davis	7–9	1–1 vs UCSB
7	Cal State Northridge	7–9	0–2 vs. UCSB
8	UC Riverside	4–12	
DNQ	Cal Poly	2–14	

== Schedule and results ==
Game	Time	Matchup	Score	Television
Quarterfinals – Thursday, March 14
1	12:00 pm	No. 2 UC Santa Barbara vs. No. 7 Cal State Northridge	71–68	ESPN3
2	2:30 pm	No. 3 Cal State Fullerton vs. No. 6 UC Davis	75–71	ESPN3
3	6:00 pm	No. 1 UC Irvine vs. No. 8 UC Riverside	63–44	ESPN3
4	8:30 pm	No. 4 Hawaii vs. No. 5 Long Beach State	66–68	ESPN3
Semifinals – Friday, March 15
5	6:30 pm	No. 1 UC Irvine vs. No. 5 Long Beach State	75–67	ESPN3/ESPNU
6	9:00 pm	No. 2 UC Santa Barbara vs. No. 3 Cal State Fullerton	58–64	ESPNU
Championship – Saturday, March 16
7	8:30 pm	No. 1 UC Irvine vs. No. 3 Cal State Fullerton	92–64	ESPN2
Game times in PT. Rankings denote tournament seeding. All games held at Honda Center, Anaheim, California

== Bracket ==
Quarterfinals; Thursday, March 14; ESPN3
1	UC Irvine	63
8	UC Riverside	44
4	Hawaii	66
5	Long Beach State	68
(Pairings are reseeded after the first round)
2	UC Santa Barbara	71
7	Cal State Northridge	68
3	Cal State Fullerton	75
6	UC Davis	71

Semifinals; Friday, March 15; ESPNU (re-seeded)
1	UC Irvine	75
5	Long Beach State	67
2	UC Santa Barbara	58
3	Cal State Fullerton	64

Championship; Saturday, March 16; ESPN2
1	UC Irvine	92
3	Cal State Fullerton	64
