= Sacramento State Hornets men's basketball =

Basketball team at California State University, Sacramento in Sacramento, California

2026–27 Sacramento State Hornets men's basketball team
- University: California State University, Sacramento
- First season: 1948–49; 78 years ago
- Athletic director: Mark Orr
- Head coach: Mike Bibby; 2nd season, 10–21 (.323)
- Location: Sacramento, California
- Arena: Hornet Pavilion (capacity: 3,000)
- NCAA division: Division I
- Conference: Big West
- Nickname: Hornets
- Colors: Green and gold
- All-time record: 848–1,195 (.415)

NCAA Division I tournament runner-up
- 1962*
Other NCAA Division I tournament results
Third place	1962*
Final Four	1962*
Elite Eight	1962*
Sweet Sixteen	1962*
Appearances	1959*, 1962*, 1970*, 1988*

Uniforms
Home	Away
- * at Division II level

The Sacramento State Hornets men's basketball team represents California State University, Sacramento, located in Sacramento, California. The program competes in the Big West Conference (Big West) in Division I of the National Collegiate Athletic Association (NCAA). The Hornets play their home games at Hornet Pavilion. The Hornets have yet to play in the NCAA Division I Tournament or the National Invitation Tournament (NIT). They are currently coached by Mike Bibby and that same year, former NBA star Shaquille O'Neal took over as the GM of basketball operations at the university. They were members of the Big Sky Conference from 1999 to 2026.

== Postseason ==
=== CIT results ===
The Hornets have appeared in the CollegeInsider.com Postseason Tournament (CIT) once, with a record of 1–1.

Year	Round	Opponent	Result
2015	First round Second Round	Portland; Northern Arizona	W 73–66; L 73–78

=== NCAA Division II Tournament results ===
The Hornets appeared in the NCAA Division II Tournament four times, with a combined record of 4–7.

Year	Round	Opponent	Result
1959	Regional semifinals Regional 3rd Place	Cal State Los Angeles; Willamette	L 57–83; L 57–76
1962	Regional semifinals Regional Finals; Elite Eight; Final Four; Championship	Seattle Pacific; Cal Poly Pomona; Valparaiso; Nebraska Wesleyan; Mount Saint Mary's	W 68–57; W 73–65; W 61–54; W 74–73 ^{2OT} L 57–58 ^{OT}
1970	Regional semifinals Regional 3rd Place	UC Riverside; Boise State	L 62–67; L 61–63
1988	Regional semifinals Regional 3rd Place	Cal State Hayward; Cal State Bakersfield	L 85–96; L 89–90

== Facilities ==
=== Hornet Pavilion ===
The men's basketball team plays in the 3,000 seat Hornet Pavilion since 2025.

=== The Nest ===
The men’s basketball team played in the 1,012 seat facility from 1955 to 2025.

== Coaches ==
The Sacramento State men's basketball team has had 17 head coaches, with four head coaches being interim.

Head Coach	Years	Record	Pct.
Warren Conrad	1948–1952	33–40	.452
Hal Wolf	1952–1956; 1957–1959	63–71	.470
Harvey Roloff	1956–1957	10–12	.455
Everett Shelton	1959–1968	117–118	.498
Jack Heron	1968–1978; 1979–1984	196–258	.432
Elmo Slider (interim)	1977–1979	9–25	.264
Fred Lewis (interim)	1984–1985	7–23	.233
Bill Brown	1985–1987	17–27	.447
Joseph Anders	1987–1992	75–86	.466
Don Newman	1992–1997	20–114	.142
Tom Abatemarco	1997–2000	13–66	.165
Jerome Jenkins	2000–2008	80–147	.352
Brian Katz	2008–2021	150–232	.392
Brandon Laird (interim)	2021–2022	11–18	.379
David Patrick	2022–2024	24–42	.364
Michael Czepil (interim)	2024–2025	7–25	.467
Mike Bibby	2025–present	10–21	.219

== Notable players ==
- Mikh McKinney (born 1992), basketball player for the Astros de Jalisco of the CIBACOPA
- Cody Demps (born 1993) - basketball player for the Hapoel Be'er Sheva of the Israeli Premier League
- Nick Hornsby (born 1995) - basketball player for the Dorados de Chihuahua of the Liga Nacional de Baloncesto Profesional
- Eric Stuteville (born 1995), first overall pick in the 2017 NBA G League Draft
- Izayah Le'afa (born 1996), basketball player for the Wellington Saints of the New Zealand National Basketball League
- Joshua Patton (born 1997), basketball player for the Górnik Wałbrzych of the Polish Basketball League
- Jonathan Komagum (born 1998), basketball player for the Gostivar of the Macedonian League
- Xavier Ford (born 2000), basketball player for the Borneo Hornbills of the Indonesian Basketball League
- Mikey Williams (born 2004), current Hornet guard, former four-star recruit

== Conferences ==
Years	Conferences	Win–loss	Pct.
1948–1954	None	—	—
1954–1981	Far Western Conference (FWC)		
1982–1994	Northern California Athletic Conference (NCAC)		
1995–1996	American West Conference (AWC)		
1996–2026	Big Sky Conference		
2026–present	Big West Conference (BWC)		
