= Jerome Jenkins =

Biographical details
- Born: July 2, 1967 (age 59); Los Angeles, California, U.S.

Playing career
- 1986–1987: Los Angeles CC
- 1987–1988: Southwestern Oregon CC
- 1988–1990: Regis
- Position: Point guard

Coaching career (HC unless noted)
- 1990–1991: Regis (asst.)
- 1993–1997: Diablo Valley CC (asst.)
- 1997–1999: Eastern Washington (asst.)
- 1999–2000: Sacramento State (asst.)
- 2000–2008: Sacramento State
- 2008–Present: Santa Monica CC

Head coaching record
- Overall: 80–147 (college); 95–93 (junior college)

Jerome Martin Jenkins (born July 2, 1967) is a former head men's basketball coach at California State University, Sacramento. His contract was not renewed following the 2007–2008 season. Jenkins played collegiately for Lonnie Porter at Regis University.

== Head coaching record ==
=== College ===
Record table
Season	Team	Overall	Conference	Standing	Postseason
Sacramento State Hornets (Big Sky Conference) (2000–2008)
2000–01	Sacramento State	5–22	2–14	7th	
2001–02	Sacramento State	9–19	3–11	T-6th	
2002–03	Sacramento State	12–17	5–9	T-6th	
2003–04	Sacramento State	13–15	7–7	T-2nd	
2004–05	Sacramento State	12–16	8–6	3rd	
2005–06	Sacramento State	15–15	5–9	5th	
2006–07	Sacramento State	10–19	5–11	6th	
2007–08	Sacramento State	4–24	2–14	9th	
Sacramento State:		80–147	37–81		
Total:		80–147			
National champion Postseason invitational champion Conference regular season champion Conference regular season and conference tournament champion Division regular season champion Division regular season and conference tournament champion Conference tournament champion

=== Junior college ===
Record table
Season	Team	Overall	Conference	Standing	Postseason
Santa Monica Corsairs (Western State Conference) (2008–present)
2008–09	Santa Monica	9–20	1–11	7th (South)	
2009–10	Santa Monica	12–15	4–8	6th (South)	
2010–11	Santa Monica	20–8	10–2	1st (South)	CCCAA SoCal Regionals Second Round
2011–12	Santa Monica	15–13	6–6	3rd (South)	
2012–13	Santa Monica	15–9	6–4	T-2nd (South)	
2013–14	Santa Monica	14–12	3–9	6th (South)	
2014–15	Santa Monica	10–16	5–9	6th (South)	
Santa Monica:		95–93	35–49		
Total:		95–93			
National champion Postseason invitational champion Conference regular season champion Conference regular season and conference tournament champion Division regular season champion Division regular season and conference tournament champion Conference tournament champion
