= Michael Czepil =

Australian basketball coach

Current position
- Title: Head coach
- Team: BA Centre of Excellence
- Conference: NBL1 East

Biographical details
- Born: 5 June 1986 (age 40); Melbourne, Australia

Playing career
- 2005–2009: Nicholls

Coaching career (HC unless noted)
- 2010–2013: Nicholls (assistant)
- 2015–2017: Werribee Devils
- 2016–2018: Basketball Victoria High Performance
- 2018–2022: UC Riverside (assistant)
- 2021–2022: UC Riverside (associate HC)
- 2022–2024: Sacramento State (associate HC)
- 2024–2025: Sacramento State (interim HC)
- 2026–present: BA Centre of Excellence

Head coaching record
- Overall: 7–25 (.219)

Michael Czepil (ZEH-pull; born 5 June 1986) is an Australian basketball coach and former player who is currently the head coach for the BA Centre of Excellence men's team. Czepil was the interim head coach for the Sacramento State Hornets men's basketball team during the 2024–25 season.

== Early life and college ==
Michael Czepil was born on 5 June 1986, and is from the Melbourne suburb of Hoppers Crossing. After attending Thomas Carr College for secondary school, Czepil attended Nicholls State University, where he played basketball. While at Nicholls, Czepil's college career was hampered by injuries.

== Coaching career ==
Following his playing career at Nicholls, Czepil became an assistant coach for the basketball team in 2010. In 2015, Czepil became the head coach of the Werribee Devils, a team in the Australian semi-professional basketball league, the Big V. Concurrently with his time at Werribee, Czepil also coached the Basketball Victoria high performance team, which eventually led to him resigning from Werribee due to time constraints. In 2018, Czepil led the U18 Australian National Team at the Albert Schweitzer Tournament in Germany. Czepil returned to American basketball in 2018 when he became an assistant basketball coach for the UC Riverside Highlanders men's basketball team. In 2021, Czepil was promoted to associate head basketball coach for UC Riverside. Czepil followed former UC Riverside head coach David Patrick to Sacramento State, where he became the associate head basketball coach. Before the 2024–25 season, Patrick left Sacramento State for a position on the LSU Tigers men's basketball team, causing Czepil to be named interim head coach for Sacramento State. Czepil heavily recruited many Australian basketball players to Sacramento State shortly after becoming interim head coach. Czepil finished his season as interim head coach with a 7–25 record.

On 22 June 2026, Czepil was appointed head coach of the BA Centre of Excellence men's team in the NBL1 East.

== Head coaching record ==
Record table
Season	Team	Overall	Conference	Standing	Postseason
Sacramento State (Big Sky) (2024–2025)
2024–25	Sacramento State	7–25	3–15	10th	
Sacramento State:		7–25 (.219)	3–15 (.167)		
Total:		7–25 (.219)			
National champion Postseason invitational champion Conference regular season champion Conference regular season and conference tournament champion Division regular season champion Division regular season and conference tournament champion Conference tournament champion
