= Jack Heron (basketball) =

American basketball player and coach (1926–2012)

Biographical details
- Born: July 28, 1926
- Died: January 10, 2012 (aged 85); Dubois, Wyoming, U.S.

Playing career
- 1947–1949: Whitman
- 1949–1950: Sacramento State
- Position: Guard

Coaching career (HC unless noted)
- 1964–1968: Sacramento State (assistant)
- 1968–1978: Sacramento State
- 1979–1984: Sacramento State

Head coaching record
- Overall: 196–258

Jack E. Heron (July 28, 1926 – January 10, 2012) was an American basketball coach. He is the winningest coach in Sacramento State University history.

Heron, from Worland, Wyoming, played collegiately for Whitman College and Sacramento State. After coaching at the high school level in Shoshoni, Wyoming, and Sacramento, Heron joined Everett Shelton's staff at Sacramento State.

Following Shelton's retirement in 1968, Heron was named head coach, a position he held until 1984 (with the exception of the 1978–79 season, which he missed due to illness). Heron amassed a record of 196–258 (.432), making him the school's all-time leader in wins.

Heron died on January 10, 2012, in his home in Dubois, Wyoming.
