= David Patrick (basketball) =

Australian basketball coach (born 1976)

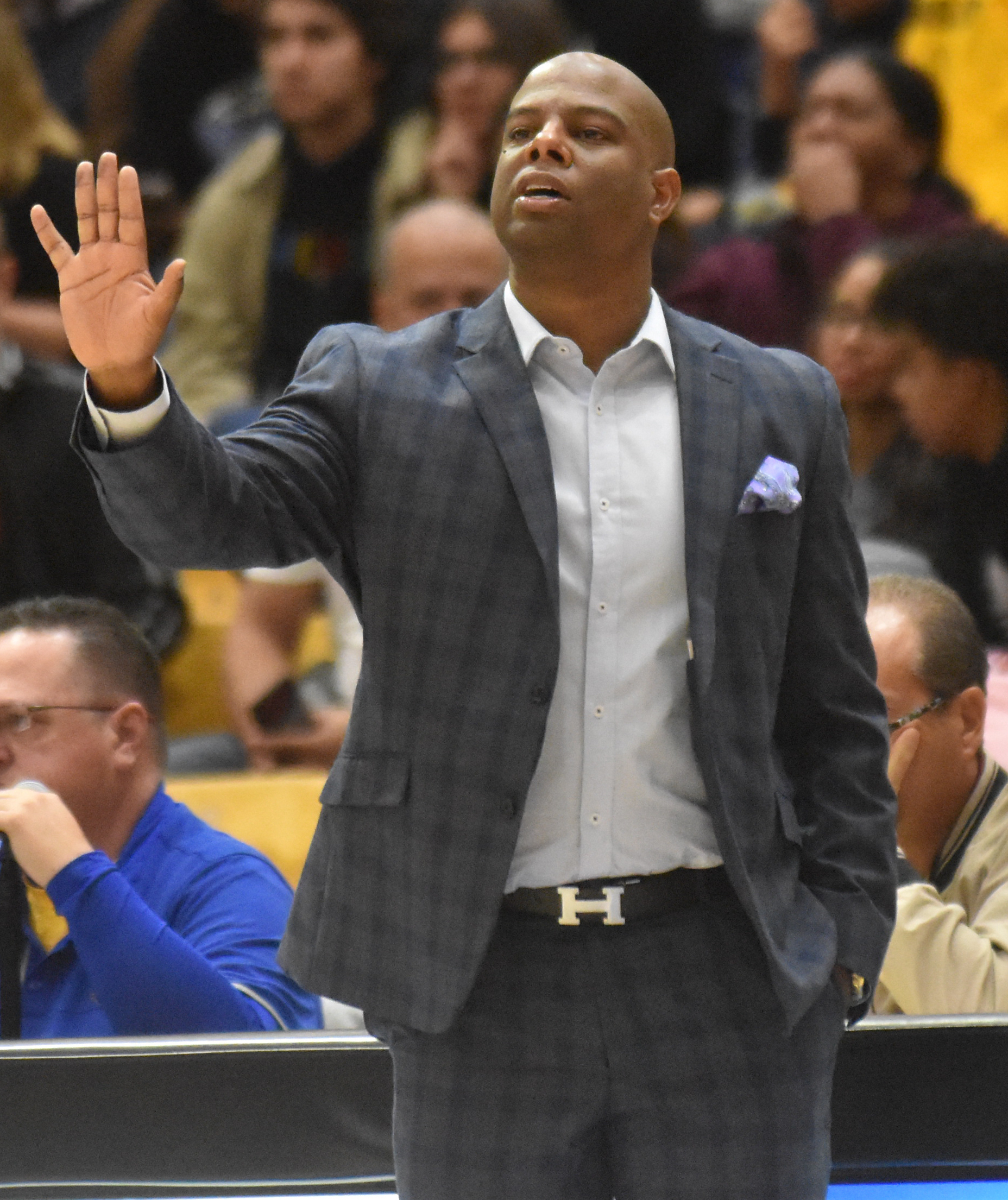

Current position
- Title: Associate head coach
- Team: Arizona State
- Conference: Big 12

Biographical details
- Born: 21 February 1976 (age 50); Hamilton, Bermuda

Playing career
- 1995–1996: Syracuse
- 1997–2000: Southwestern Louisiana/ Louisiana–Lafayette
- 2000–2001: Canberra Cannons
- 2001–2003: Chester Jets
- 2003–2005: Castellion Castellón de la Plana, Spain

Coaching career (HC unless noted)
- 2005–2006: Nicholls State (assistant)
- 2006–2010: St. Mary's (assistant)
- 2012–2016: LSU (assistant)
- 2016–2018: TCU (assistant)
- 2018–2020: UC Riverside
- 2020–2021: Arkansas (assoc. HC)
- 2021–2022: Oklahoma (assoc. HC)
- 2022–2024: Sacramento State
- 2024–2026: LSU (assoc. HC)
- 2026–present: Arizona State (assoc. HC)
- International: career
- 2019–2021: Australia (assistant)

Administrative career (AD unless noted)
- 2010–2012: Houston Rockets (personnel scout)

Head coaching record
- Overall: 51–80 (.389)

David Alexander Patrick (born 21 February 1976) is an Australian college basketball coach who is the associate head coach at Arizona State. He is the former head coach of the Sacramento State Hornets men's basketball team and the UC Riverside Highlanders men's basketball team. He is the godfather of NBA player Ben Simmons.

== Playing career ==
Born in Bermuda, and raised in Melbourne, Australia, Patrick arrived stateside in 1994, enrolling at Chapel Trafton High School in Baton Rouge, Louisiana, where he was district MVP and First Team All-Parish, while also being selected to play in the Louisiana State High School All-Star Game. In addition, Patrick continued to compete for Australia at the youth national level.

Patrick attended Syracuse for one season where he was part of the Orange's 1996 NCAA tournament Final Four team, before transferring to play his remaining three years of eligibility at Southwestern Louisiana (later Louisiana–Lafayette).

After college, Patrick returned to Australia where he played professionally for one season with the Canberra Cannons of the National Basketball League, and also had stops in England with the Chester Jets, and in Spain with Castellion before taking up coaching.

== Coaching career ==
=== College ===
Patrick's first stop as an Assistant was at Nicholls State University, where he worked for head coach JP Piper. In 2006 Patrick joined Saint Mary's College During his time at Saint Mary's they made multiple NCAA tournaments, including a 2010 NCAA Sweet 16 appearance. In four seasons at St Mary's the team went 98-35 and compiled 2 NCAA Tournaments and an NIT Quarterfinal berth. In 2012, Patrick joined the staff of LSU under Johnny Jones, where he was pivotal in bringing Ben Simmons, his godson, to the Tigers. During his time at LSU they made the 2014 NIT, and 2015 NCAA Tournament where they eventually lost to North Carolina State 66–65. Patrick spent four seasons at LSU where the team went 80-51 during that span.

After four seasons at LSU, Patrick joined Jamie Dixon's staff at TCU in 2016. In 2017 they were NIT Champions for the first time in school history. In 2018 the school reached the NCAA Tournament for the first time in 20 years.

On 14 March 2018, Patrick was named the head coach at UC Riverside. His inaugural season saw the Highlanders break several program records including 279 three-point shots culminating in a .379 three-point shooting percentage which was the best in the Big West Conference and top 30 (28th) in the nation. In 2019-20 UC Riverside won 17 games which is tied for the most Division 1 wins in school history. They started the season with a 66–47 win at the University of Nebraska–Lincoln in the Big Ten Conference The team finished 8th Nationally in Scoring Defense 60.6ppg, and 1st in the Big West. The season was cut short on 10 March, due to concerns over the coronavirus pandemic. In his two years at UC Riverside, Patrick currently holds the best 2-year start in school history.

On July 1, 2020, Patrick joined the staff of Eric Musselman as the associate head coach at Arkansas.

=== International ===
Patrick was named as an assistant coach in 2019 to the Australian men's national basketball team. The team competed in the 2019 FIBA World Cup, where they made it to the semifinals, eventually finishing 4th. Patrick was also named to the staff of the Australian national team for the 2020 Summer Olympics. However, he was later replaced by John Rillie due to an Achilles injury.

Patrick remained on the Boomers' coaching staff in 2025 under new coach Adam Caporn.

== Head coaching record ==
Record table
Season	Team	Overall	Conference	Standing	Postseason
UC Riverside (Big West) (2018–2020)
2018–19	UC Riverside	10–23	4–12	8th	
2019–20	UC Riverside	17–15	7–9	5th	
UC Riverside:		27–38 (.415)	11–21 (.344)		
Sacramento State (Big Sky) (2022–2024)
2022–23	Sacramento State	14–18	7–11	6th	
2023–24	Sacramento State	10–24	4–14	10th	
Sacramento State:		24–42 (.364)	11–25 (.306)		
Total:		51–80 (.389)			
National champion Postseason invitational champion Conference regular season champion Conference regular season and conference tournament champion Division regular season champion Division regular season and conference tournament champion Conference tournament champion
