= Spectrum OC16 =

- Country: United States
- Broadcast area: Hawaii
- Headquarters: Honolulu, Hawaii

Programming
- Picture format: 1080i (HDTV); 480i (SDTV)

Ownership
- Owner: Charter Communications

Links
- Website: oc16.tv and ocsports.tv

Spectrum OC16 is a Hawaiian television channel owned by Charter Communications (which acquired Oceanic Time Warner Cable in 2016), based in Honolulu, Hawaii, United States and broadcasts to the state of Hawaii on Oceanic channel 12/digital 1012 for general interests, on channel 16/digital 1016 (also known as Spectrum Sports Hawaii) for sports programming, and on channel 255 for pay-per-view events, particularly University of Hawaii football. The channels are available nationwide on the mainland for Spectrum subscribers via its app through channels 2203/2204 respectively.

== Background ==
The channel, which was first launched as a cable access channel in 1976, offers a local alternative to the traditional produced television offerings featuring two channels, one operating on channel 12 that broadcasts in-house shows geared towards Hawaiians, while a second channel on channel 16 is devoted to local sports, including athletic events from the University of Hawaii until 2026. Both channels are also offered in HD and can be viewed on its in-demand channels on Spectrum's digital services.

In addition, Spectrum also offered a pay-per-view channel on channel 255 for select University of Hawaii football games, which was discontinued in 2025.

=== Oc 16 in-house programming ===
==== Entertainment ====
- Fashion Sense by Valerie
- Brown Bags to Stardom
- Da Braddahs and Friends
- Dis n Dat (This and that)
- Eh, u da kine, ah
- It's a Hawaii Thing
- The Champ Show
- Ken Yo Dama
- Miss Hawaii Pageant
- Overdrive Live
- Pakele Live
- Hawaii Reel Stories
- Tiny TV

==== Cooking ====
- Cooking Hawaii Style
- Cooking With Cutty
- Hawaiian Grown/Hawaiian Grown Kitchen

==== Personal Interests/Hobbies ====
- Crazy Deals TV
- The Pet Hui
- Island Driver TV
- Joy of Crafting
- Hawaii's Wedding Professionals
- Showcase Hawaii
- Think Tech
- Upside-Down Pilates
- Wedding of a Lifetime
- Career Changers

==== Travelling ====
- Outside Hawaii
- Ultimate Japan

==== Educational/Family Oriented ====
- Building Blocks for Tots
- If I Neva Do D.A.T. (Drugs, Alcohol, Tobacco)
- Outstanding Educator
- Play Smart Hawaii
- Russell The Rooster
- School Spirit, Professional Pride
- Teach It Hawaii

=== Oc 16 sports programming ===
- University of Hawaii athletic events (until 2026)
- OC16 High School Sporting events
- Billabong Surf TV
- Flhi Girlz
- Hawaii Goes Fishing
- Hawaii Skin Diver
- Hawaii Xtreme Sports
- Inside OC16 Sports Rewind
- Kai Wahine
- Molokai Hoe
- Na Wahine O Ke Kai
- OC 16 Daily Surf Report
- Ocean Paddler TV
- PacWest Magazine
- Soul Surfers
- Sports People Hawaii
- Xterra Adventures
- What SUP
