= Gabriel Hughes =

American baseball player (born 2001)

Colorado Rockies – No. 43
- Pitcher
- Born: August 22, 2001 (age 25); Anchorage, Alaska, U.S.
- Bats: Right Throws: Right

MLB debut
- July 3, 2026, for the Colorado Rockies

MLB statistics (through 2026 season)
- Win–loss record: 0–8
- Earned run average: 6.33
- Strikeouts: 56
- Stats at Baseball Reference

Teams
- Colorado Rockies (2026–present)

Gabriel Alexander Hughes (born August 22, 2001) is an American professional baseball pitcher for the Colorado Rockies of Major League Baseball (MLB). He played college baseball at Gonzaga University and was selected by the Rockies in the first round of the 2022 MLB draft. He debuted in MLB in 2026.

== Amateur career ==
Hughes graduated from Renaissance High School in Meridian, Idaho. The school did not offer any athletic programs, so Hughes played baseball for Rocky Mountain High School in Meridian. In 2018, his junior year, he had a 7–1 win–loss record with a 1.84 earned run average (ERA) and 59 strikeouts while batting .461. He was named the Idaho Gatorade Baseball Player of the Year. As a senior in 2019, he went 7–1 with a 0.95 ERA and 65 strikeouts alongside batting .365 with seven home runs and was named the Idaho Gatorade Baseball Player of the Year for the second straight season. That summer, he played in the West Coast League for the Bellingham Bells. Unselected in the 2019 Major League Baseball draft, he enrolled at Gonzaga University to play college baseball for the Gonzaga Bulldogs.

As a freshman at Gonzaga in 2020, Hughes had a 0.77 ERA with 13 strikeouts over 13 2/3 innings before the season was cancelled due to the COVID-19 pandemic. That summer, he briefly played in the Northwoods League for the Great Lakes Resorters, a temporary Covid pod team based in Traverse City, Michigan. In 2021, as a redshirt freshman, he started ten games and went 4–3 with a 3.23 ERA and 67 strikeouts over 61 1/3 innings while also starting 31 games at first base, batting .247 with three home runs. His season ended early after breaking a knuckle while batting. That summer, he was selected to play for the U.S. Collegiate National Team. Hughes entered the 2022 season as a preseason All-American and Gonzaga's number one starter. He also switched his focus solely to pitching after being a two-way player in previous seasons. He started 15 games during the season and went 8–3 with a 3.21 ERA and 138 strikeouts over 98 innings. Following the season, he traveled to San Diego where he participated in the draft combine.

== Professional career ==
The Colorado Rockies selected Hughes in the first round with the tenth overall selection of the 2022 Major League Baseball draft. He signed with the team for $4 million. He made his professional debut with the Fresno Grizzlies of the Single-A California League with whom he made one appearance, pitching three scoreless innings. Hughes opened 2023 with the Spokane Indians of the High-A Northwest League. In early June, he was promoted to the Hartford Yard Goats of the Double-A Eastern League. In July, it was announced Hughes would undergo Tommy John surgery, ending his season. In 14 starts between the two teams, he went 6–5 with a 6.21 ERA and 83 strikeouts over 66 2/3 innings.

Hughes returned to play in the Arizona Fall League in late 2024. He started 2025 with Hartford before earning a promotion to the Albuquerque Isotopes of the Triple-A Pacific Coast League in late May after going 1–3 with a 3.07 ERA and 37 strikeouts in 41 innings. In 14 starts for the Isotopes, he posted a 4–3 record and 5.11 ERA with 48 strikeouts across 61 2/3 innings pitched. On November 18, the Rockies added Hughes to their 40-man roster to protect him from the Rule 5 draft. Hughes was optioned to Albuquerque to begin the 2026 season. He was placed on the injured list on April 30, and began a rehab assignment with Spokane on May 29. Hughes returned to pitch with Albuquerque and had a 2–1 record, a 5.31 ERA, and 48 strikeouts over 40 2/3 innings.

On July 1, 2026, the Rockies promoted Hughes to the major leagues for the first time. He made his MLB debut on July 3 at Coors Field against the San Francisco Giants and struck out one batter across three scoreless innings of relief in a 15–3 Rockies win, and was awarded the save. Hughes made his first career start on July 8 against the Los Angeles Dodgers at Dodger Stadium and gave up three earned runs, two walks, and four hits alongside seven strikeouts across six innings. For the Rockies, he pitched in 14 games (13 starts) and ended the season with a 0–8 record, a 6.33 ERA, and 56 strikeouts over 64 innings.

== Personal life ==
Hughes's brother Jacob pitched in college for the Oregon Ducks and Loyola Marymount Lions and professionally for the Boise Hawks. They also have four adopted siblings. Both their parents are obstetrician gynecologists. Their grandfather, Donald Hughes, played in the Detroit Tigers minor league system from 1960 to 1962.

Hughes's mother is from Belize. She speaks Spanish, which Hughes began learning in high school, later practicing with his minor league teammates.

Hughes graduated from Gonzaga in three years with a degree in biology and has considered attending medical school.
