= Owyhee High School =

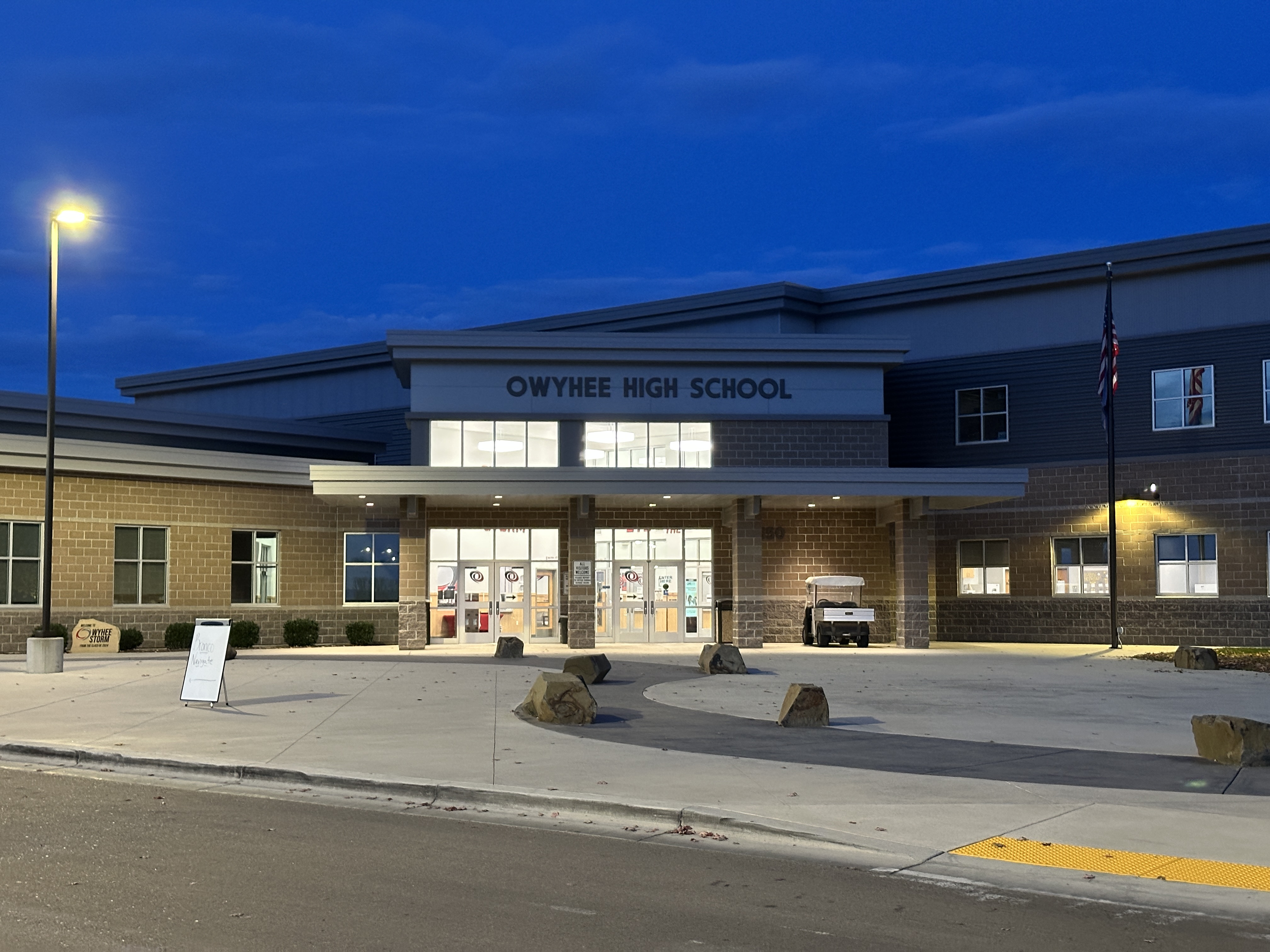

Location
- 3650 N. Owyhee Storm Ave; Meridian, Idaho 83646; United States; 43.6383°N 116.4822°W

Information
- Type: Public
- Opened: August 26, 2021
- School district: West Ada S.D. (#2)
- Principal: Rachel Edwards
- Grades: 9-12
- Colors: Red, Dark Gray
- Fight song: Mighty Owyhee
- Athletics conference: IHSAA Class 6A, Southern Idaho (6A) (SIC)
- Nickname: Storm
- Rival: Rocky Mountain, Eagle
- Newspaper: STORMCAST
- Yearbook: The Eye
- Website: https://www.westada.org/o/Owyhee

Owyhee High School is a high school serving grades 9-12 located in Meridian, Idaho, United States. Opening in 2021, it is the newest of the six high schools within the West Ada School District, and serves the furthest west portions of Ada County, including parts of Meridian and Star. When the school first opened, it had an enrollment of approximately 1,500 students.

== Extracurriculars ==
Owyhee hosts many clubs, including, but not limited to, FFA, FCCLA, BPA, IYA, HOSA, Art Club, Rocket Club, TSA.

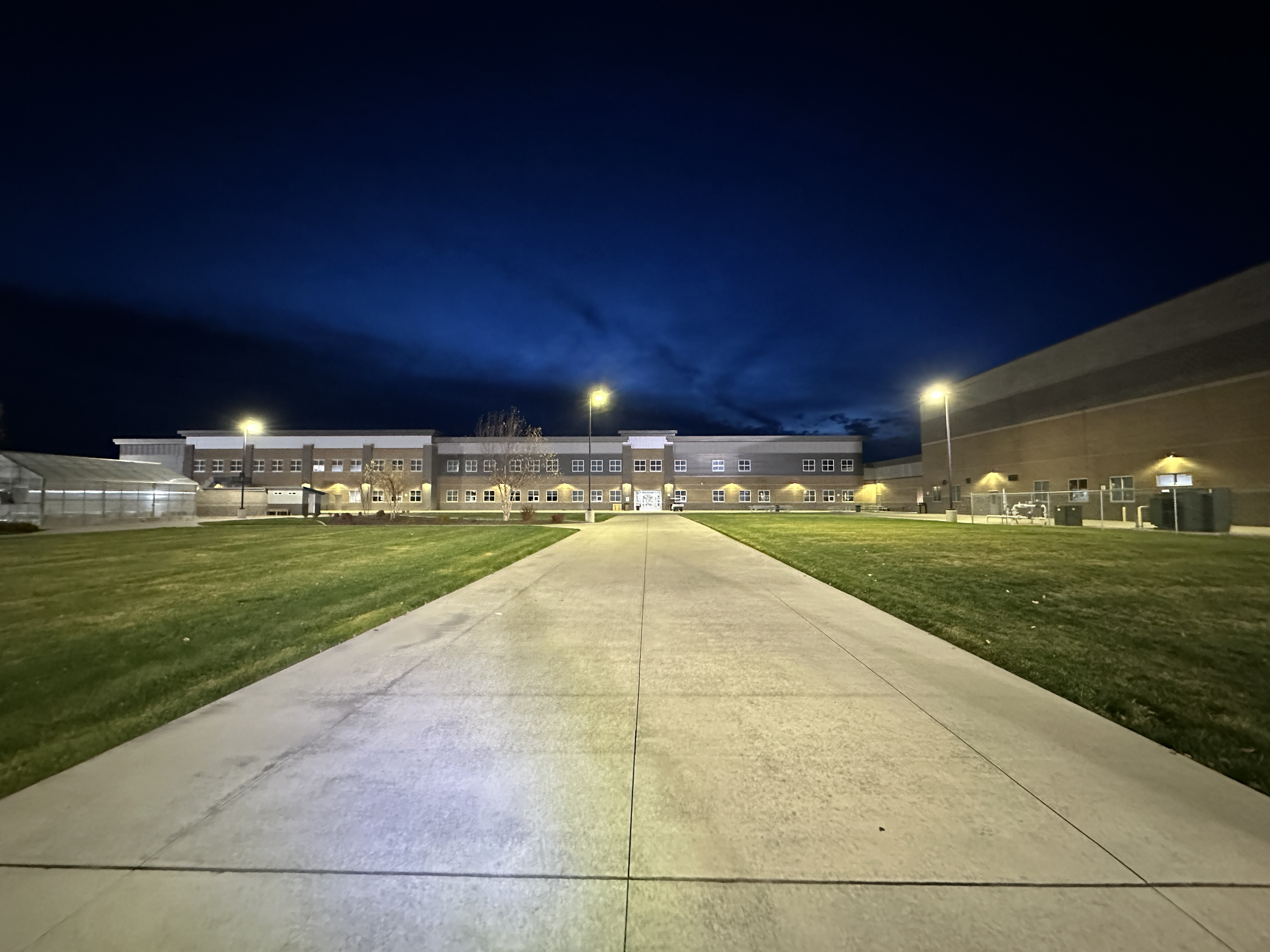
View of Owyhee High School's Eastern side

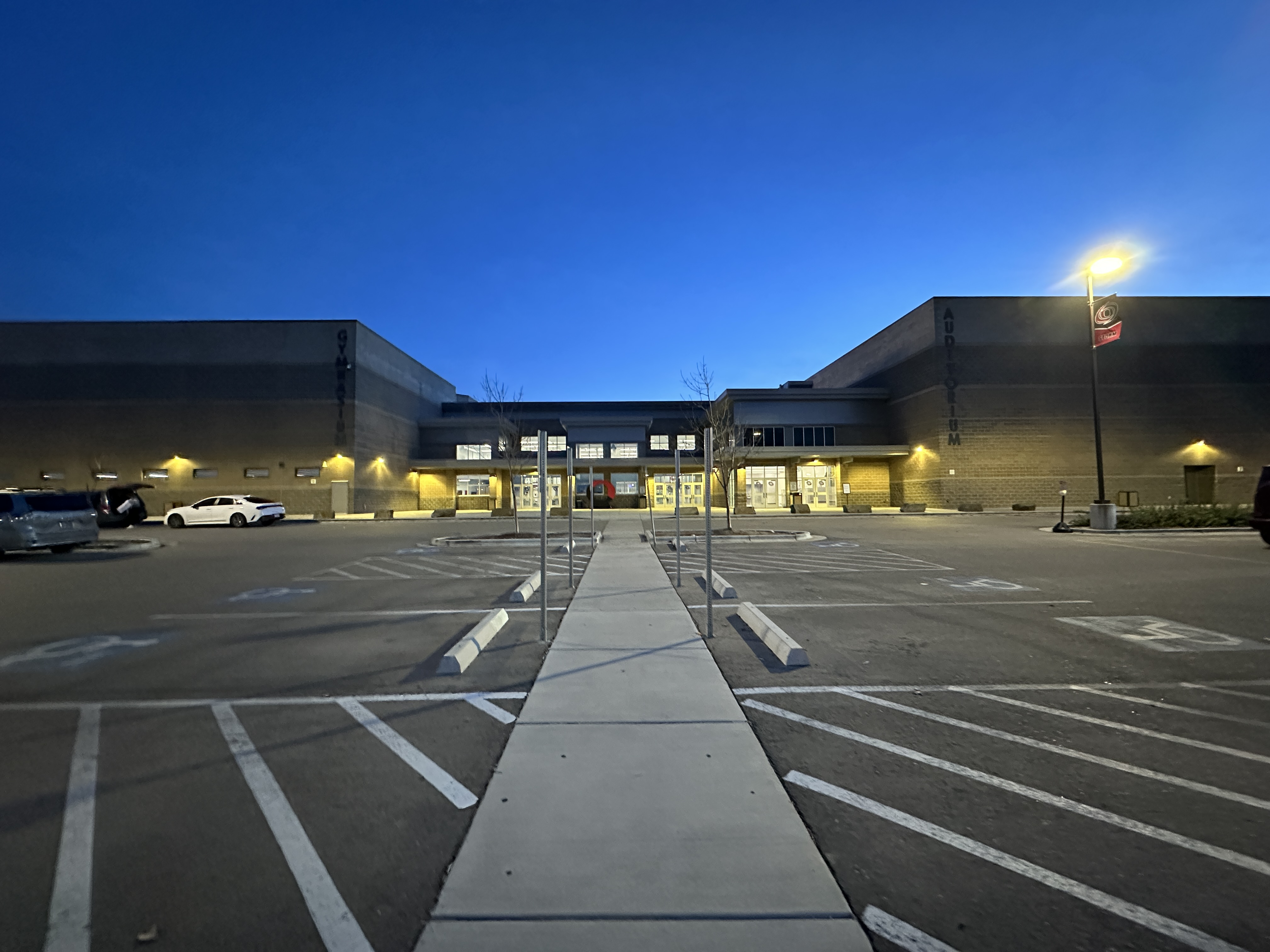
The gymnasium and auditorium of Owyhee High School

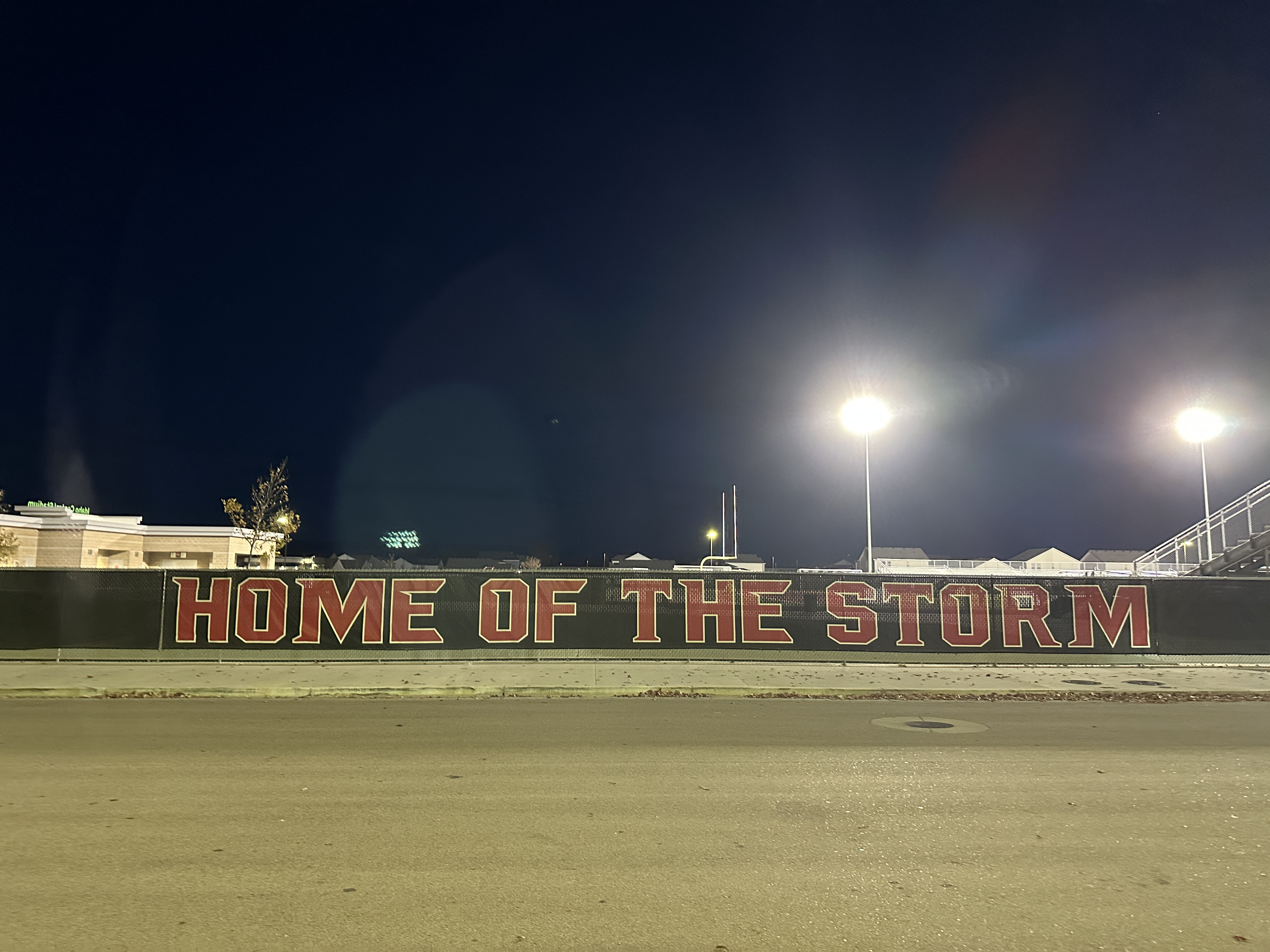
Home of the storm banner for Owyhee High School

== Athletics ==
Owyhee fields 31 athletics and activities programs (mix of club and state-sanctioned programs). Owyhee's state-sanctioned teams compete in IHSAA Class 6A, for the largest schools in the state, and are members of the Southern Idaho Conference (6A) (SIC). The school colors are red, dark grey, and white, and the school's mascot is the Storm. The fight song is called Mighty Owyhee and is played to the tune of Mighty Oregon.

=== State titles ===
==== Boys ====
Basketball (3): 2022, 2024, 2025

Baseball (3): 2022, 2023, 2024 (Independent tournament; IHSAA did not sponsor a state baseball tournament until the 2025 season)

Swimming (1): 2025

==== Girls ====
Softball (2): 2023, 2025

Soccer (1): 2023

Basketball (1): 2025

==== Activities ====
Dance (3): 2023, 2024, 2025
