= Mountain View High School (Idaho) =

Location
- 2000 Millennium Way; Meridian, Idaho 83642; United States; 43.587°N 116.368°W

Information
- Type: Public
- Established: 2003, 23 years ago
- School district: West Ada S.D. (#2)
- Principal: Karen Rice
- Teaching staff: 113.17 (FTE)
- Grades: 9–12
- Enrollment: 2,521 (2023-2024)
- Student to teacher ratio: 22.28
- Colors: Navy, Kelly green, and silver
- Athletics: IHSAA Class 6A
- Athletics conference: Southern Idaho (6A) (SIC)
- Mascot: Maverick / Bull
- Nickname: Mavericks
- Rivals: Meridian, Rocky Mountain
- Newspaper: KBUL-14
- Yearbook: The View
- Elevation: 2,650 ft (810 m) AMSL
- Website: Mountain View HS
- Last updated: 5/17/2026

Location in the United States
Location in Idaho

Mountain View High School is a four-year public secondary school, located in Meridian, Idaho. Opened twenty-three years ago in the fall of 2003, it is the fourth of six traditional high schools in the West Ada School District (#2) and serves its southern portion. The school colors are Navy Blue, Kelly Green, and Silver, and the mascot is the maverick.

== Athletics ==
Mountain View competes in the IHSAA Class 6A, for the largest schools in the state, and is a member of the Southern Idaho Conference 6A (SIC). In 2012, Mountain View had the largest enrollment in the state, followed by neighboring Rocky Mountain.

=== The Stinky Sneaker ===
The Stinky Sneaker is a rivalry basketball game between MVHS and Meridian High School. It is a spirit competition with 3 categories: spirit, sportsmanship, and decorations.

Wins

- 2006
- 2007
- 2008
- 2009
- 2010
- 2011
- 2023
- 2024

=== State titles ===
- Marching Band (2): fall 2023, 2025

Boys

- Cross Country (3): fall 2006, 2014, 2015
- Track (2): 2025, 2026
- Football (1): fall 2016
- Soccer (1): fall 2006
- Basketball (1): 2011
- Wrestling (1): 2008
- Lacrosse (1): 2013
- Rugby (2): 2014, 2016
- Baseball (1): 2019

Girls

- Basketball (3): 2015, 2016, 2020
- Cross Country (3): fall 2008, 2010, 2016
- Track (8): 2009, 2011, 2012, 2014, 2017, 2018, 2025, 2026

== Notable alumni ==
- Lexy Halladay-Lowry
- Tyler Shoemaker
