= Rasean Jones =

American football player

No. 19 – Boise State Broncos
- Position: Wide receiver
- Class: Freshman

Personal information
- Listed height: 6 ft 2 in (1.88 m)
- Listed weight: 215 lb (98 kg)

Career information
- High school: Rocky Mountain (Meridian, Idaho)
- College: Boise State (2026–present)
- Stats at ESPN

Rasean Jones is an American football wide receiver for the Boise State Broncos.

== Early life ==
Jones attended Baker High School in Baker City, Oregon, and Rocky Mountain High School in Meridian, Idaho. He earned second-team all-state honors in football and was a three-time state champion hurdler in Oregon. Jones committed to play college football for the Boise State Broncos.

== College career ==
Jones competed for immediate playing time as a true freshman at Boise State in 2026. Heading into the season opener, he was announced as a starting wide receiver. In his debut, Jones caught four passes for 76 yards in a loss to Oregon.
