= Meridian High School (Idaho) =

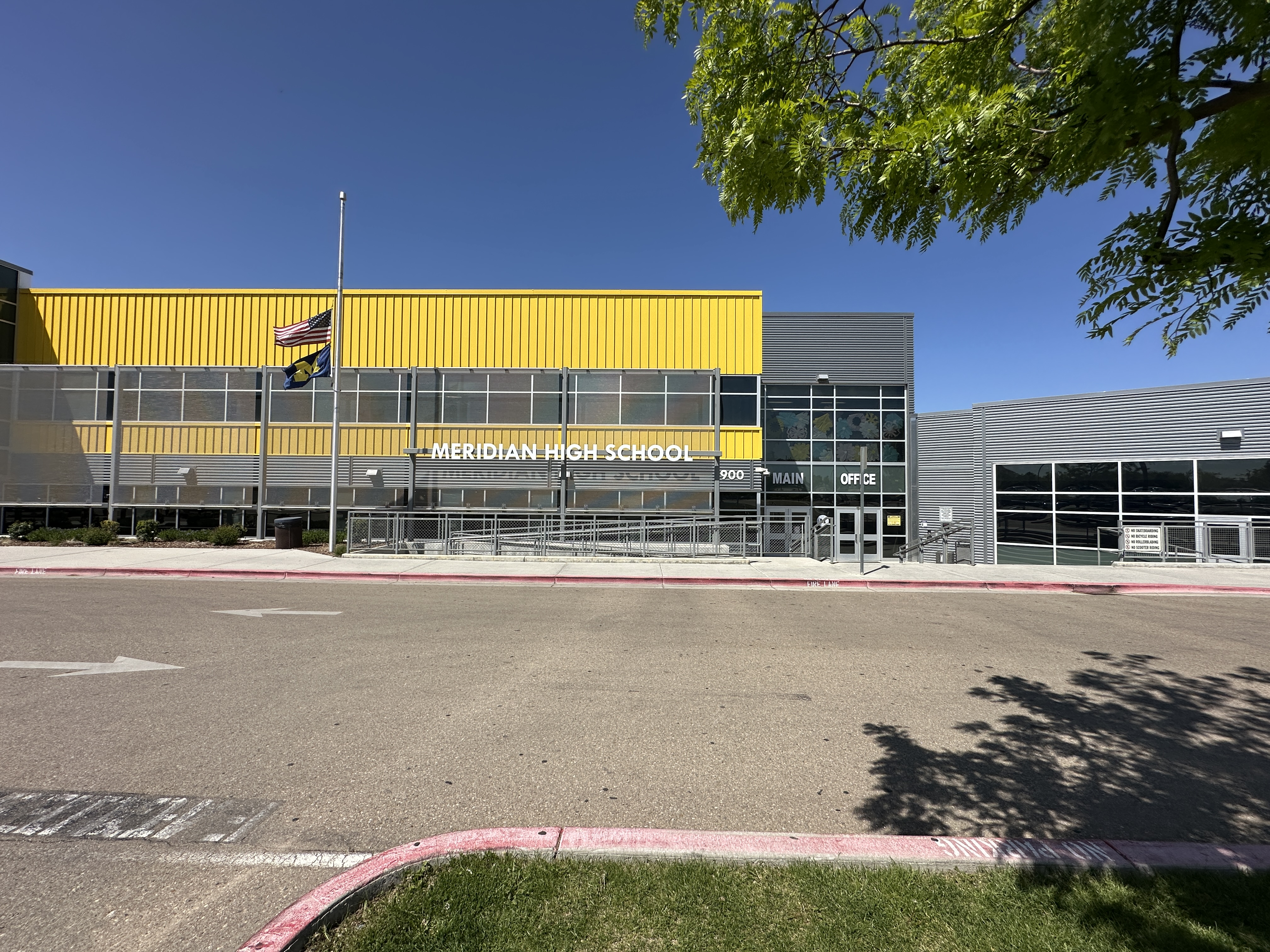

Location
- 1900 West Pine Avenue; Meridian, Idaho 83642; United States; 43°36′47″N 116°25′01″W

Information
- Type: Public
- Founded: 1904, 1975 (current)
- School district: West Ada
- Principal: Brian Murphy
- Teaching staff: 95.17 (FTE)
- Grades: 9–12
- Enrollment: 1,823 (2023–2024)
- Student to teacher ratio: 19.16
- Colors: Blue & Gold
- Athletics: IHSAA Class 5A
- Athletics conference: Southern Idaho (5A) (SIC)
- Nickname: Warriors
- Rival: Mountain View
- Yearbook: Mana Ha Sa
- Elevation: 2,560 ft (780 m) AMSL
- Website: www.westada.org/mhs

Meridian High School is a four-year public secondary school within the West Ada School District located in Meridian, Idaho, comprising grades 9–12.

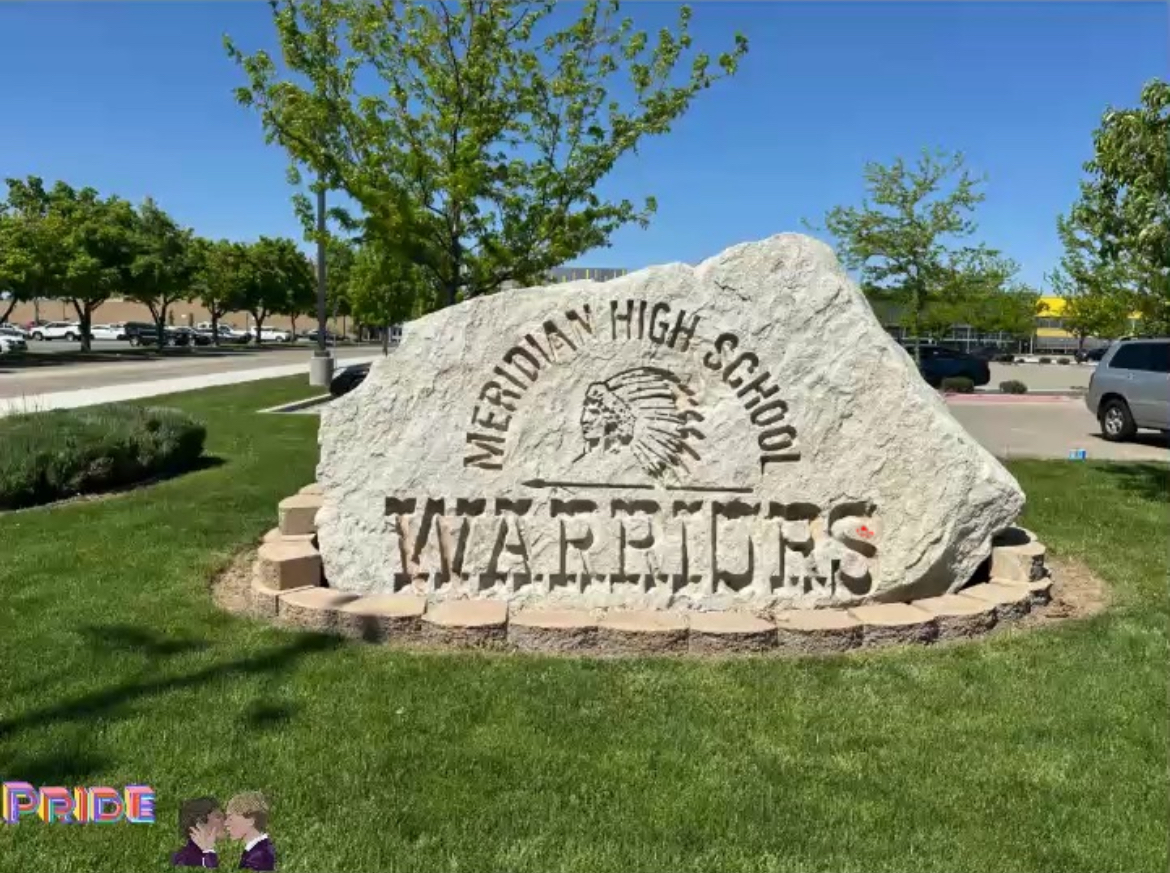
Rock located outside of the main entrance.

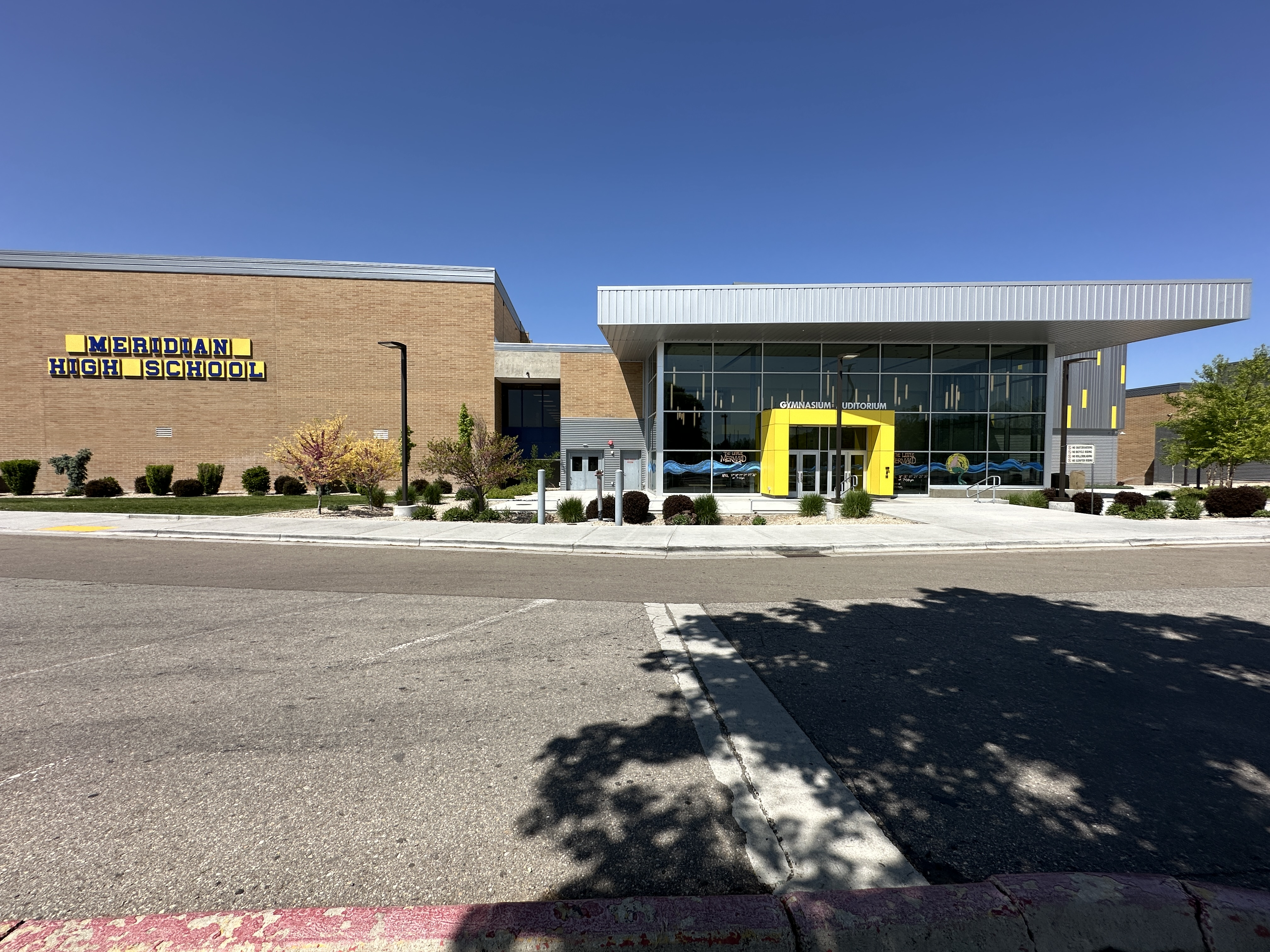
The gymnasium and auditorium of Meridian High School in Idaho

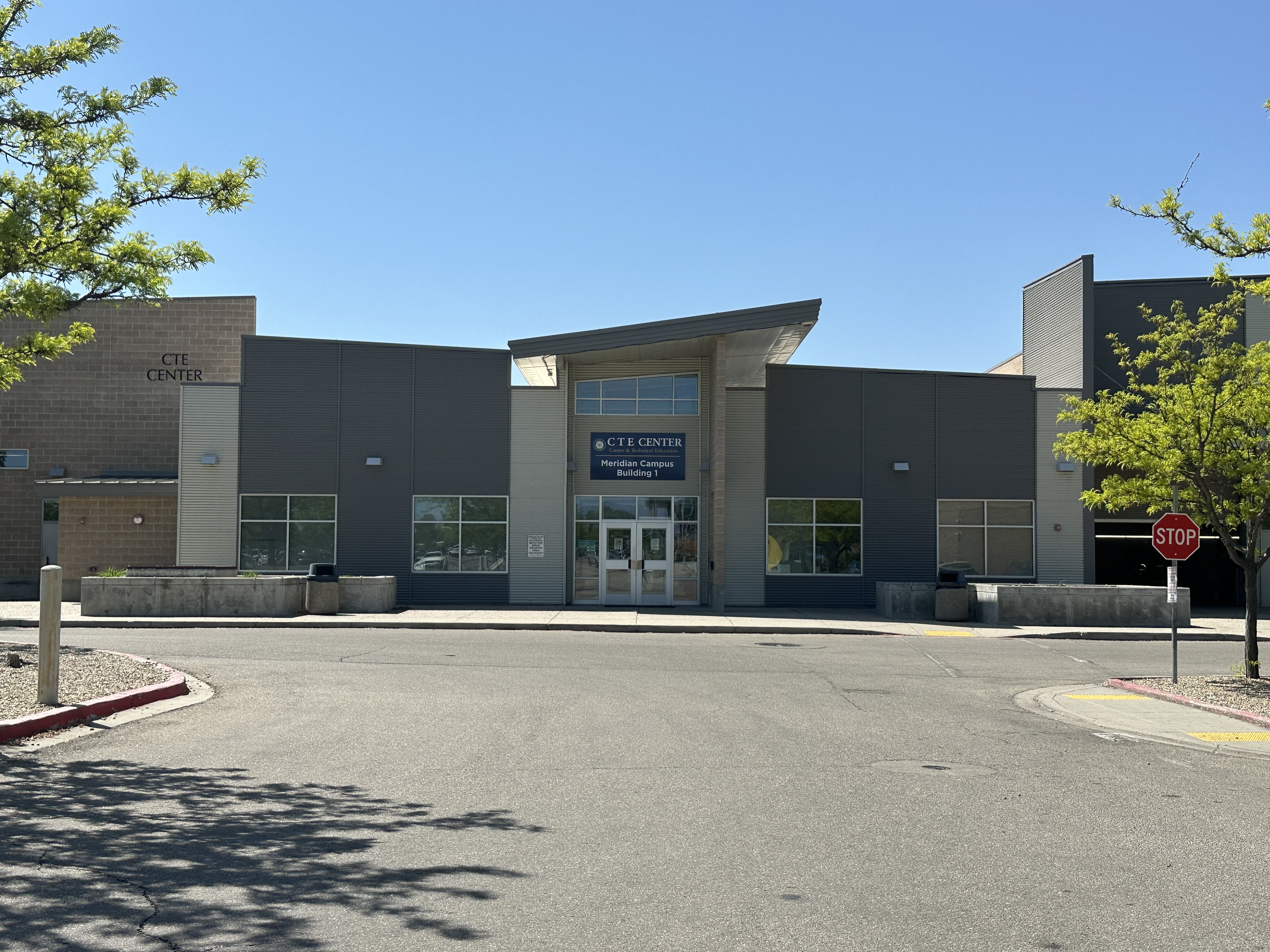
Building 1 of the Career & Technical Education (CTE) center of Meridian High School in Idaho

== History ==
The school began classes in the year of 1904 at the corners of Pine Street and Meridian Road, in a one-room schoolhouse. Meridian High was the first high school in the Meridian area. During most of the twentieth century, Meridian and surrounding areas were separated from Boise to the east by a significant amount of agricultural land, which later became developed.

In 1975, a larger, more modern campus (initially containing four buildings) was built at the present location, at the intersection of Pine Ave. and Linder Rd. With enrollment already exceeding capacity when the new campus opened, an addition to the classroom building was completed the following year. Growth continued into the mid-1980s, forcing the school to adopt a split-shift schedule to accommodate the 2,400 students attending a facility built for 1,800.

Until 1987, it was the only high school in the Meridian (West Ada) school district, and had the largest enrollment in the state. With rapid growth in the Meridian and west Boise area, four additional high schools in the district opened in the next two decades to relieve congestion.

In the fall of 2007, a new PTC building was constructed, housing three new shops and adding additional space for students and faculty. Additional space for the Future Farmers of America (FFA) was also established.

== Athletics ==
The Warriors have won over 60 district and 39 state championships. The most recent additions were the 5A state wrestling (spring 2022) and state and national dance championships.

- Fall sports: soccer, football, cross country, volleyball, golf, rugby
- Winter sports: wrestling, basketball, ski boarding
- Spring sports: baseball, softball, tennis, track, and lacrosse
- Year-round sports and activities: swimming, cheer, dance, competitive speech and debate

=== State titles ===
Boys

- Football (3): fall 1986, 2005, 2007 (official with introduction of playoffs, fall 1979)
  - (unofficial poll titles - 0) (poll introduced in 1963, through 1978)
- Cross Country (3): fall 1986, 1998, 2001 (introduced in 1964)
- Basketball (4): 1979, 1983, 1992, 2021
- Wrestling (9): 1983, 1985, 1986, 1987, 2021, 2022, 2023, 2024, 2026 (introduced in 1958)
- Baseball (2): 1985, 1987 (records not kept by IHSAA, state tourney introduced in 1971)
- Track (2): 1986, 1987 l
- Golf (4): 1983, 2001, 2002, 2003 (introduced in 1956)
- Soccer (2): 1995, 2002
- Ice Hockey (2): 2000, 2001

Girls

- Cross Country (4): fall 1999, 2000, 2001, 2002 (introduced in 1974)
- Volleyball (1) fall 1981 (introduced in 1976)
- Basketball (4): 1980, 1981, 1982, 1983 (introduced in 1976)
- Track (1): 1986 (introduced in 1971)

Combined

- Tennis (3): 1963, 1964, 1983 (introduced in 1963, combined team until 2008)

== School newspaper ==
The Meridian High Newspaper, the Warwhoop, has history dating back to the 1940s. The current layout design program used is Adobe InDesign CS3. The Warwhoop historic papers collection is located at Meridian High School in the newspaper room.

== Yearbook ==
The school's yearbook is called the Mana Ha Sa which is said to be how MHS is pronounced by some unspecified Native Americans. The current layout design program used is Adobe InDesign CS3.

== Bands ==
The band program consists of: Warrior Marching Band, Warrior Pep Band, Symphonic Band, Varsity Jazz Band, Percussion Ensemble, Jazz Combo and Concert Band.

== Notable alumni ==
- Gracie Pfost (attended, '24) - state's first woman in Congress (1953–63)
- Vern Law ('48) - MLB pitcher, 162 wins
- Ron Packard ('49) - congressman from southern California (1983–2001)
- William Agee ('56) - business executive
- Jerry Bowers ('74) - NASCAR driver
- Russ Fulcher ('80) - congressman from Idaho's first district (2019–present)
- James Smith ('91) - commander of Peterson-Schriever Garrison of U.S. Space Force
- Max Butler - former security consultant and online hacker arrested for theft
- Kyle Brotzman - Boise State placekicker (2007–10)
