= Meridian Medical Arts Charter High School =

Coordinates: 43°38′21″N 116°22′21″W

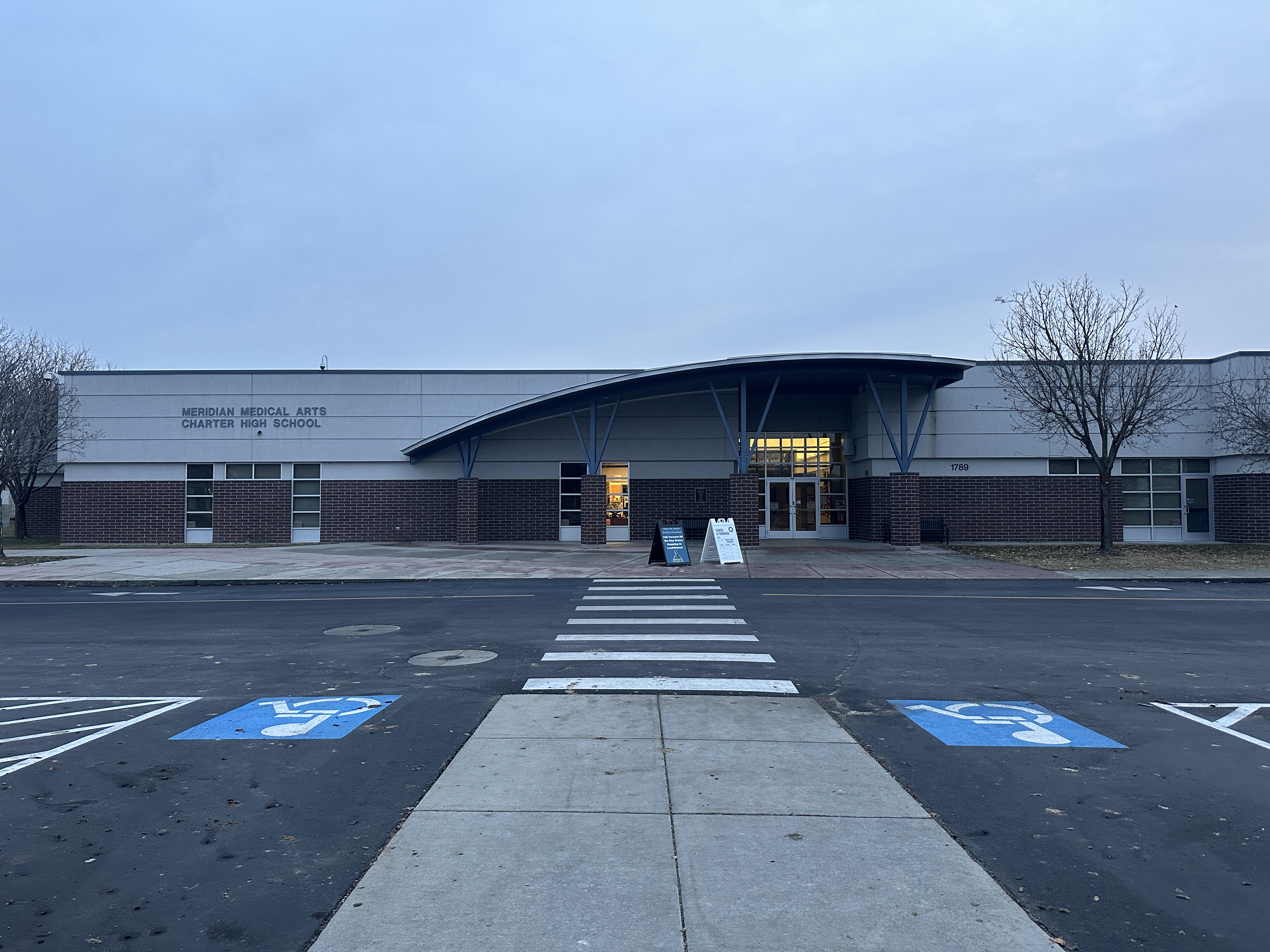
- View of entrance in 2026

Location
- 1789 East Heritage Park Lane; Meridian, Idaho 83646; United States

Information
- Type: Charter
- Motto: Academic excellence -- Learning for Health Sciences
- Established: Fall 2003
- School district: West Ada School District
- Principal: Benjamin Michael Merrill
- Faculty: 14.00 (FTE)
- Grades: 9-12
- Enrollment: 198 (2018–19)
- Student to teacher ratio: 14.14
- Colors: Maroon, Navy Blue, and Silver
- Mascot: Guardian Knight
- Website: MMACHS

Meridian Medical Arts Charter High School is a charter high school commissioned by the West Ada School District. Meridian Medical Arts Charter High School has a separate board of trustees and policies than the West Ada School District. Included in its program are an associates degree (Associate of Science in Health Science) through Idaho State University, a wide array of concurrent credit opportunities, and certifications in MA, EMT, Pharmacy Technician. MMACHS is designed to help springboard alumni into their Pre-Med, Nursing, Paramedics, and Medical Assisting degrees. Meridian Medical Arts Charter High School was ranked the #1 Public Charter High School in Idaho and #68 ranked Public Charter High School in the US by Niche in 2025.

The school shares a campus with Meridian Technical Charter High School (MTCHS). The two schools do not share classes; lunch is provided within the MMACHS cafeteria, and busing is provided at MTCHS.
