= Meridian Technical Charter High School =

Coordinates: 43°38′21″N 116°22′21″W

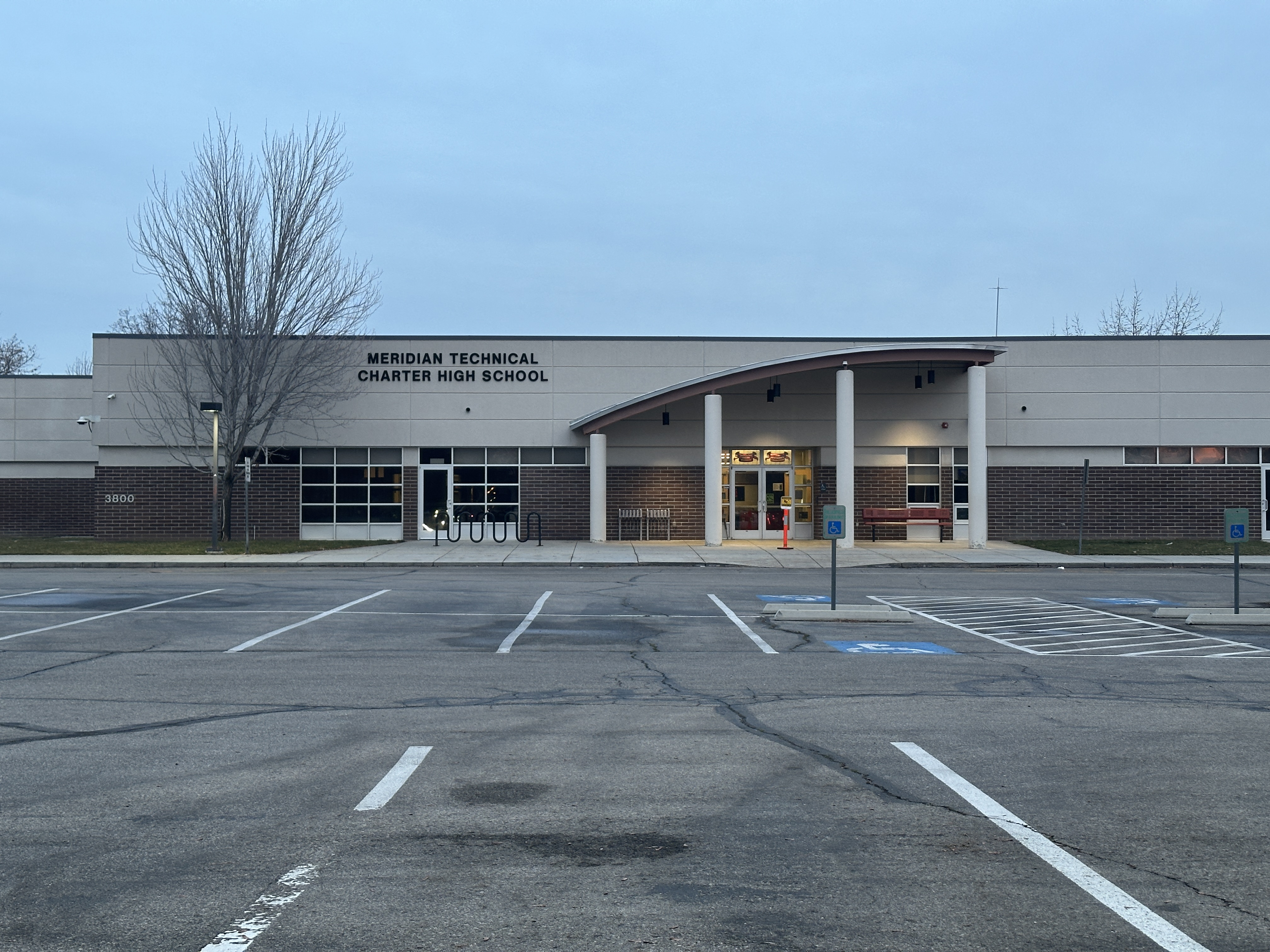
- View of entrance in 2026

Location
- 3800 North Locust Grove Road; Meridian, Idaho 83646; United States

Information
- Type: Charter
- Established: 1999
- School district: West Ada School District
- Principal: Craig Miller
- Faculty: 14.00 (FTE)
- Grades: 9–12
- Enrollment: 201 (2018–19)
- Student to teacher ratio: 14.36
- Colors: Black and red
- Mascot: Dragons
- Website: www.mtchs.org

Meridian Technical Charter High School (MTCHS) is a high school located in Meridian, Idaho, United States. The student population is 170–200 students, with a maximum of seventy students per grade. The school shares a campus with Meridian Medical Arts Charter High School (MMACHS). The two schools do not share classes; lunch is provided within the MMACHS cafeteria, and busing is provided at MTCHS. The school was originally known as Meridian Charter High School, which was changed to avoid confusion with nearby Meridian Medical Arts Charter High School.

== Purpose ==
The purpose of MTCHS is to educate students in the fields of technology. The technical courses offered are programming, graphic arts, networking, engineering and electronics. College level classes are also offered, which allow students to graduate with college credits, certifications, or even the possibility of a college degree (with an extended and per-student curriculum). MTCHS requires that students complete an internship of 280 hours either in the summer before, or during their senior year. Internships have been completed in the past with major Boise area companies like HP, Micron Technology and Urban Design.

== Focus areas ==
Over the course of their high school career, each student will gradually become more specialized in an area of technology. After their freshman year, a student chooses between the Hardware and Software pathways, each of which contains two of the four major focus areas. At the end of sophomore year, students once again split into one of the two focus areas within their current pathway. The different paths represent different technical electives that the student takes during their junior and senior years. Paths are as listed below:

- Computer Networking
  - Topics include computer repair, networking, administering servers, network design, firewalls, and network security.
- Media Arts
  - Topics include graphic design, print design, web site development, video production, and photography.
- Computer Programming
  - Topics include JavaScript, XML, CSS, HTML, ASP.net, C#, Java, databases, SQL, PHP, and Software Development.
- Electronics/Engineering
  - Topics include electronics, robotics, microcontrollers, soldering, technician training, problem-solving, troubleshooting, CAD.

== Curriculum ==
MTCHS has high standards for its students. In the past MTCHS has had a higher grading school than most schools. Since the school provides many dual enrollment classes with surrounding universities, it was misleading and confusing having MTCHS grades not match up with the college grades. As of the 2013-14 school year, the grading scale has changed to match a typical school's grading system.

MTCHS still imposed the no credit system, but the letter grades are those of most public schools:

90–100: A
80–89: B
70–79: C
0–69: NC (No Credit)
