= Centennial High School (Idaho) =

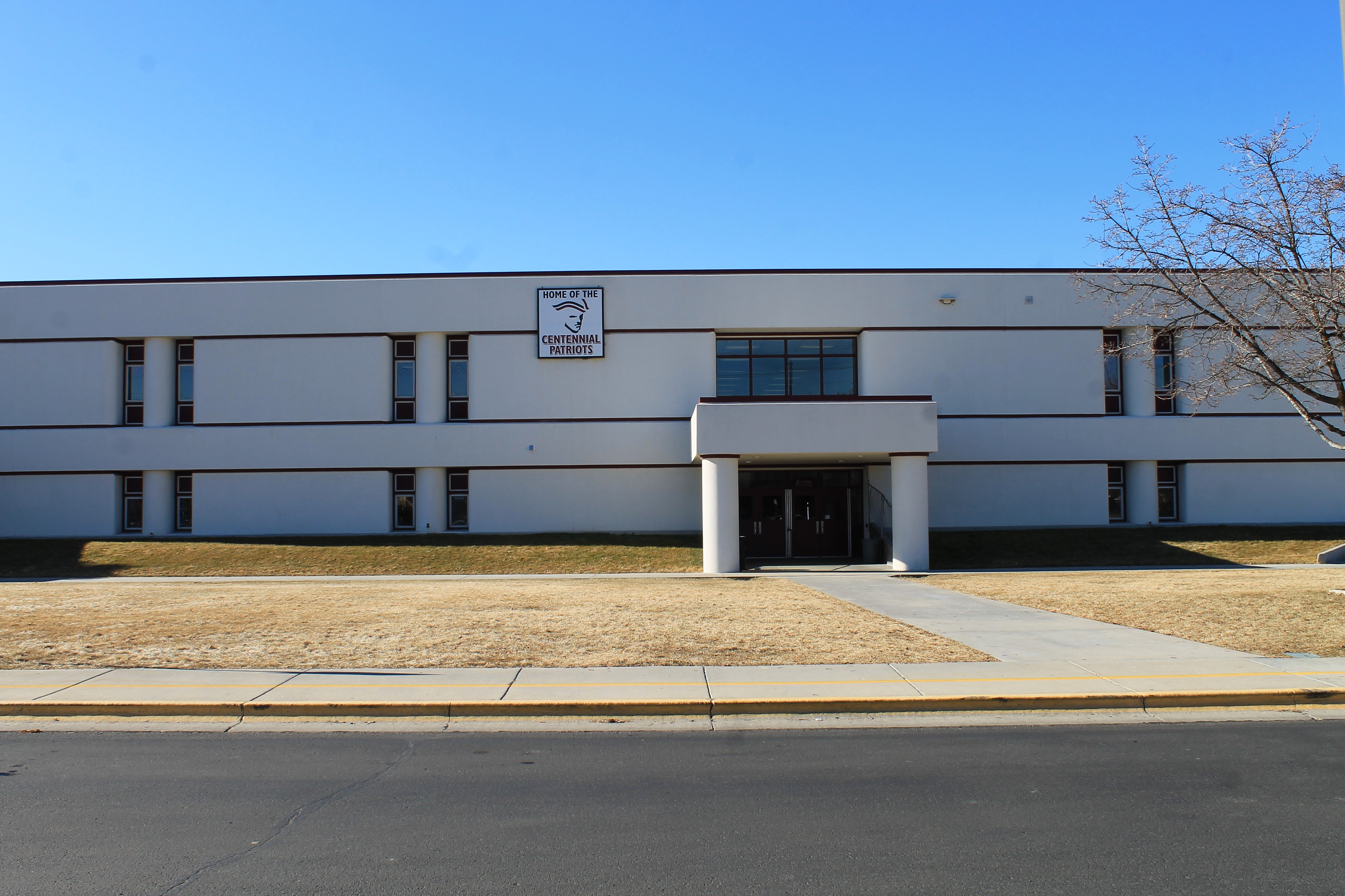

Location
- 12400 West McMillan Road; Boise, Idaho 83713; United States; 43°39′0″N 116°20′10″W

Information
- Type: Public, four-year
- Established: 1987; 39 years ago
- School district: West Ada S.D. (#2)
- Principal: Ryan Wilhite
- Teaching staff: 85.68 (on an FTE basis)
- Grades: 9–12
- Enrollment: 1,743 (2024–2025)
- Student to teacher ratio: 20.34
- Colors: Maroon & Silver
- Athletics: IHSAA Class 5A
- Athletics conference: Southern Idaho (5A) (SIC)
- Mascot: Patriot
- Feeder schools: Lewis & Clark Middle School; Lowell Scott Middle School
- YouTube Channel: KCTV Centennial
- TikTok Account: CentennialHighPatriots
- Website: School Website

Centennial High School is a four-year public secondary school in Boise, Idaho. Although located in Boise, it is part of the West Ada School District; at the time of its construction, CHS was in unincorporated Ada County. The West Ada district's second of six traditional high schools, Centennial opened in 1987 and serves neighborhoods in northwestern Boise and northeastern Meridian. The centennial of Idaho statehood was observed in 1990.

The school colors of Centennial are maroon and silver, and its mascot is a patriot.

== Demographics ==
The demographic breakdown of the 1,931 students enrolled in 2022-23 was:

- Male - 50.9%
- Female - 49.1%

Racial Demographics of the School Population by Percent and Number of Students
Race	Percent	Students
White	73.74%	1,424
Hispanic	12.38%	239
Asian	4.71%	91
Multiracial	4.40%	85
Black	3.99%	77
American Indian/Alaska Native	0.62%	12
Native Hawaiian/Pacific Islander	0.16%	3

21.7% of the students were eligible for free or reduced lunch.

== Athletics and activities ==
Among the largest schools in the state, it competes in athletics and activities in IHSAA Class 5A in the Southern Idaho Conference (5A) (SIC).

=== State titles ===
Boys

- Football (4): fall 1988, 1996, 1999, 2003
- Cross Country (5): fall 1991, 1992, 1993, 1994, 1999
- Soccer (4): fall 2000, 2004, 2005, 2006, 2009 (introduced in 2000)
- Basketball (2): 1995, 2003
- Wrestling (3): 1989, 2007, 2013
- Track (6): 1988, 1989, 1990, 1991, 1992, 1999
- Golf (1): 1994
- Hockey (2): 2012, 2013
- Tennis - (combined until 2008, see below)

Girls

- Cross Country (3): fall 1991, 1993, 1994
- Soccer (2): fall 2014, 2015 (introduced in 2000)
- Volleyball (2): fall 1993, 2001
- Basketball (5): 1993, 1996, 1998, 2004, 2006
- Softball (1): 1997 (introduced in 1997)
- Golf (4): 1990, 1991, 1992, 1993
- Tennis (1): 2008 (combined team until 2008)

Combined

- Tennis (7): 1991, 1994, 1995, 1996, 1997, 1998, 1999 (combined until 2008)
- Debate (1): 2013
- Drama (8): 2002, 2003, 2004, 2005, 2006, 2007, 2008, 2009

== Notable alumni ==
- Andrew Holmes (soldier), Responsible for the Maywand District murders
- Rick Bauer, former professional baseball player (Baltimore Orioles, Texas Rangers, Cleveland Indians)
- Sofia Huerta, soccer; Mexico women's national football team and US women's national soccer team
- Aaron Paul, actor (best known as Jesse Pinkman on the AMC series Breaking Bad)
- Logan Emory, soccer - MLS - Los Angeles Galaxy
- Brock Forsey, football - National Football League (NFL) - (Chicago Bears, Miami Dolphins, Washington Redskins)
