= West Ada School District =

School district in Idaho, United States

West Ada School District #2

Address
- 1303 E Central Dr Meridian, ID 83642 Meridian, Idaho Western Ada County, Idaho United States

District information
- Type: Public
- Motto: "Preparing Today's Students for Tomorrow's Challenges"
- Grades: K-12
- Established: 1945
- Superintendent: Derek Bub
- Budget: $364,896,418 (2024-25)

Students and staff
- Students: 38,906 (2023-24)
- Athletic conference: Southern Idaho Conference - 6A (IHSAA)

Other information
- Website: westada.org

The West Ada School District #2, long known as the Meridian School District, is a school district based in Meridian, Idaho. In addition to Meridian, the district operates public schools in Eagle, Star and western Boise. It is the largest school district in Idaho. In 2025, the district received widespread attention for banning "Everyone is welcome here" posters that depicted children's hands in all skin colors.

In June 2014, the district board of trustees voted to change the common name of the district, previously known as the Meridian School District, to West Ada School District. The official name, Joint School District No. 2, remains unchanged.

== District information ==
The West Ada School District educates more than 35,000 students in 49 schools over an area of 382 square miles (990 km^{2}). The district has grown by more than 5,000 students in the last five years. West Ada School District schools range in enrollment from 100 to over 2,000 students. School buildings vary in age with the oldest being more than 50 years old.

In Ada County the district includes:

- All of: Avimor
- Most of: Meridian, Eagle, Star
- Portions of: Boise, Garden City, Kuna

The district extends into Canyon County, where it includes portions of Nampa and Star. West Ada School District announced its plans to move forward with building a second elementary school in Star.

== Governance ==
The district is administered by a five-member Board of Trustees elected by voters residing within the district's boundaries. Each of the five trustees represent specific geographic zones in the district. They receive no salaries or benefits and are elected to a four-year term.

Zone	Trustee (as of 2026)
1	Lori Frasure (Chair)
2	Evelyn McCullough
3	Meghan Brown
4	David Binetti
5	Rene Ozuna (Vice-Chair)

== History ==
Timeline

- 1945 - School districts reorganized to reduce 1,082 school districts in Idaho to 301 districts.
- 1950 - District named "Class A School District No. 2."
- 1963 - The District’s name was officially changed to its current name, "Joint School District No. 2."
- 2005 - Total enrollment for the district reached over 30,000.
- 2007 - The district moved into its new offices, consolidating seven different office locations.
- 2014 - Colloquial name changed from "Meridian School District" to "West Ada School District."

=== "Everyone is welcome here" controversy ===
In March 2025, West Ada School District administrators asked a teacher to remove a classroom poster deemed in violation of District Policy requiring all displays be "content neutral". The poster had hung for several years and read "Everyone is welcome here" with depictions of children's hands of all skin colors. The teacher refused to do so, and challenged the District's decision on a local news station.

In May 2025, after accepting a position with the Boise School District, the teacher resigned from the West Ada School District and removed the signs, pledging to put them up in her new classroom. The poster was deemed by Idaho Attorney General Raúl Labrador in June 2025 to be in violation of Idaho State Law 33-143 prohibiting controversial displays on public school property. In February 2026, the teacher filed a federal lawsuit claiming violation of First Amendment rights. The lawsuit is currently pending before David Nye in the United States District Court for the District of Idaho.

=== Superintendents ===
Superintendents	Years
L.A. Thomas	1950–1953
Roy G. Denton	1953–1963
J. Lowell Scott	1964–1973
August M. Hein	1973–1985
Nick Hallett	1985–1992
Bob L. Haley	1992–1998
Christine H. Donnell	1998–2004
Linda Clark	2004–2015
Mary Ann Ranells	2016–2021
Derek Bub	2021–Present

== High schools ==
There are currently seven high schools and six alternative schools in the district, five of which are classified 5A by the Idaho High School Activities Association.

=== Boise ===
- Centennial High School - (1987)

=== Meridian ===
- Central Academy (Alternative)
- Idaho Fine Arts Academy
- Meridian Academy (Alternative)
- Meridian High School - (1904, Rebuilt 1975, Modernized 2007)
- Meridian Medical Arts Charter High School - (2003) (Alternative)
- Meridian Technical Charter High School - (1999) (Alternative)
- Mountain View High School - (2003)
- Owyhee High School - (2021)
- Rebound School of Opportunity (Alternative) (Grade 10-12)
- Renaissance High School- (2009) (Alternative)
- Rocky Mountain High School - (2008)

=== Eagle ===
- Eagle Academy (Alternative)
- Eagle High School - (1995)
- North Star Public Charter School (Alternative)

== Middle schools ==
There are currently 7 middle schools & 2 alternatives in the district.

=== Star ===
- Star Middle School

=== Meridian ===
- Heritage Middle School (2007)
- Lewis & Clark Middle School
- Meridian Middle School (1904, 1975)
- Sawtooth Middle School (2004)
- Victory Middle School (2016)

=== Boise ===
- Lake Hazel Middle School (1977) and is currently being remodeled as of May 2026, projected to finish in 2 years.
- Lowell Scott Middle School (1972)

=== Eagle ===
- Eagle Middle School

=== Alternatives (Meridian) ===
- Crossroads Middle School
- Pathways Middle School

== Elementary schools ==
There are currently 32 elementary schools in the district.

=== Meridian ===
- Barbara Morgan STEM Academy
- Chaparral Elementary
- Chief Joseph School of the Arts
- Discovery Elementary
- Hillsdale Elementary
- Hunter Elementary
- Mary McPherson Elementary
- Meridian Elementary
- Paramount Elementary
- Peregrine Elementary
- Pleasant View Elementary
- Ponderosa Elementary
- Prospect Elementary
- River Valley Elementary
- Siena Elementary

=== Boise ===
- Cecil D. Andrus Elementary
- Christine Donnell School of the Arts
- Desert Sage Elementary
- Eliza Hart Spalding (Spalding) Elementary
- Frontier Elementary
- Gateway School of Language and Culture
- Joplin Elementary
- Lake Hazel Elementary
- Pepper Ridge Elementary
- Pioneer School of the Arts
- Silver Sage Elementary
- Summerwind School of Math & Science
- Ustick Elementary

=== Eagle ===
- Eagle Elementary School of the Arts
- Eagle Hills Elementary
- Galileo STEM Academy*
- Seven Oaks Elementary

=== Star ===
- Star Elementary
- Independence Elementary

*Galileo STEM Academy is both a middle school and an elementary school
