= Renaissance High School (Idaho) =

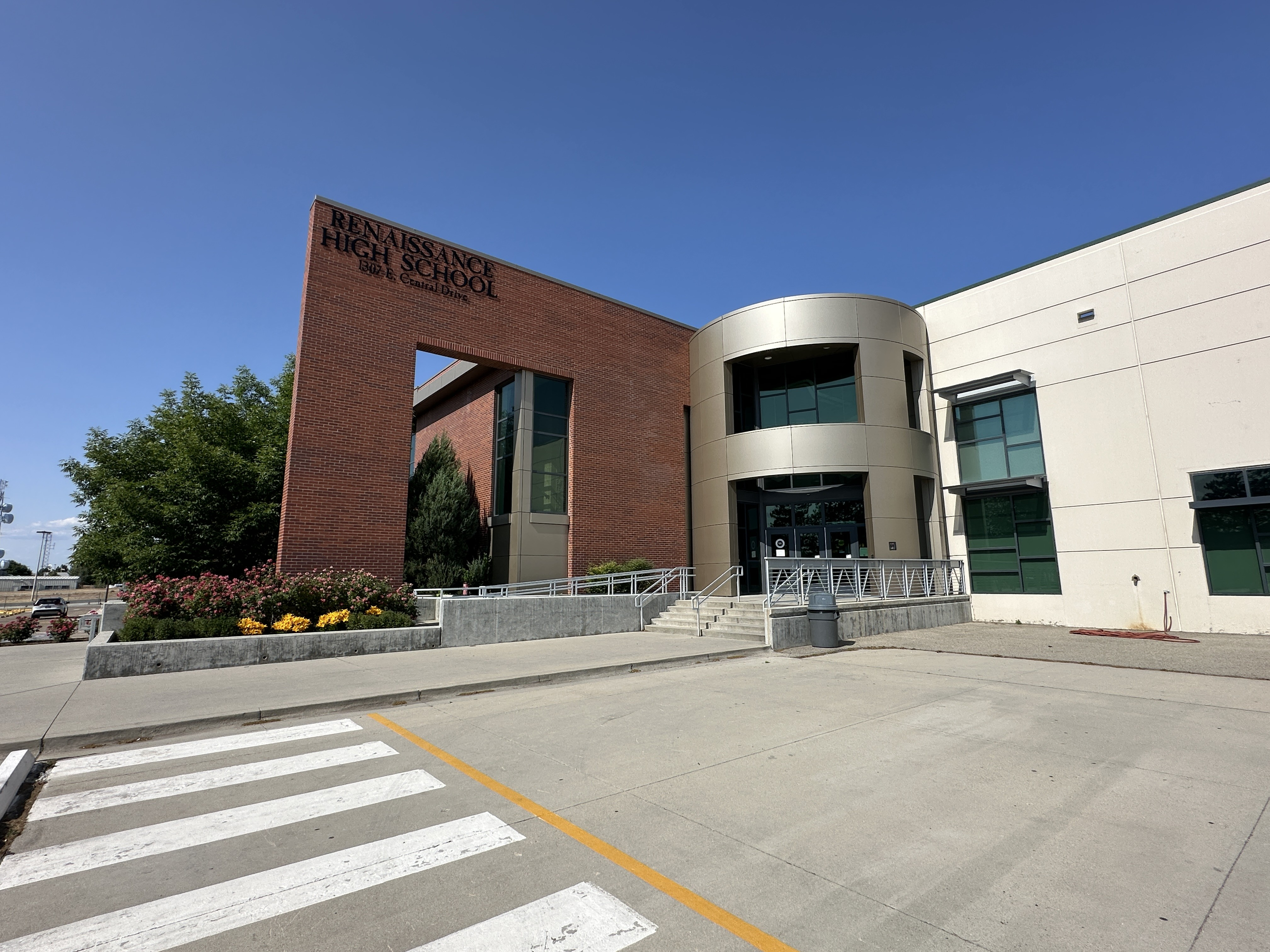
- Entrance to Renaissance High School

Location
- 1307 East Central Drive; Meridian, Idaho 83642; United States; 43°35′43″N 116°22′42″W

Information
- Type: Public secondary
- Established: 2009
- School district: West Ada School District
- Principal: Angela Edde
- Teaching staff: 45.14 (on an FTE basis)
- Enrollment: 672 (2023-2024)
- Student to teacher ratio: 14.89
- Colors: Cardinal and gold
- Nickname: Voyagers
- Website: www.westada.org/o/rhs

Renaissance High School (RHS) is a four-year public magnet high school within the West Ada School District located in Meridian, Idaho, United States.

== Academics ==
Dual high school-college enrollment is available with Idaho State University. It is possible for one to receive an associate of arts degree concurrent with their high school diploma.

Students also have the choice to take international baccalaureate (IB) classes. Options include either the IB Diploma Programme or the IB Career Programme.

Renaissance is also the host of several Career and Technical Education (CTE) programs, and students travel from other West Ada schools in order to attend these classes.

== Demographics ==
The demographic breakdown of the 658 students enrolled in 2023-2024 was:

- Male - 47%
- Female - 53%
- White - 72.3%
- Hispanic - 11.2%
- Asian - 9.6%
- Multiracial- 5.3%
- African American - 1.1%
- Pacific Islander - 0.3%
- Native American - 0.2%
