= Jeb Putzier =

American football player (born 1979)

No. 88, 87, 80
- Position: Tight end

Personal information
- Born: January 20, 1979 (age 47); Eagle, Idaho, U.S.
- Listed height: 6 ft 4 in (1.93 m)
- Listed weight: 256 lb (116 kg)

Career information
- High school: Eagle
- College: Boise State
- NFL draft: 2002: 6th round, 191st overall pick

Career history
- Denver Broncos (2002–2005); Houston Texans (2006–2007); Seattle Seahawks (2008); Denver Broncos (2008); Hartford Colonials (2010)*; Omaha Nighthawks (2010)
- * Offseason or practice squad member only

Awards and highlights
- First-team All-WAC (2001); Second-team All-Big West (1999)

Career NFL statistics
- Receptions: 96
- Receiving yards: 1,251
- Receiving touchdowns: 3
- Stats at Pro Football Reference

Jebediah Lee Putzier (pronounced PUTT-zeer) (born January 20, 1979) is an American former professional football player who was a tight end in the National Football League (NFL). He played college football for the Boise State Broncos and was selected by the Denver Broncos in the sixth round of the 2002 NFL draft. Putzier also played for the Houston Texans, Seattle Seahawks, and the UFL's Omaha Nighthawks.

== Early life ==
Putzier attended Eagle High School in his hometown Eagle, Idaho. In addition to playing football, Putzier also garnered athletic letters in basketball, track and baseball.

== College career ==
At Boise State University , Putzier initially walked on to the Broncos football team. After playing wide receiver for the first three years of his career, Putzier switched to tight end. He led all college tight ends with twelve touchdown receptions his senior season, and garnered all-Western Athletic Conference honors. The season was highlighted by a three-touchdown effort against Tulsa.

== Professional career ==
=== Denver Broncos (first stint) ===
Putzier was selected by the Denver Broncos in the sixth round (191st overall) of the 2002 NFL draft. After only recording four receptions his first two years, he contributed to the Broncos in 2004 with 36 catches. His play earned him a 5-year $12.5 million offer sheet from the New York Jets which the Broncos matched. Despite putting up 37 receptions in 2005 the Broncos released him in spring 2006 in what was considered to be a salary cap purge.

=== Houston Texans ===
Putzier signed with the Houston Texans in 2006, coming back to former Broncos offensive coordinator Gary Kubiak. After losing spots on the depth chart in 2007, the Texans released Putzier on February 20, 2008.

=== Seattle Seahawks ===
On March 4, 2008, Putzier was signed by the Seattle Seahawks. After appearing in seven games for the team, he was released on November 25.

=== Denver Broncos (second stint) ===
Late in the 2008 season, Putzier signed with the Broncos. He was resigned on March 16, 2009, but was cut late in 2009 training camp.

=== Hartford Colonials ===
After not playing for any professional team in 2009, Putzier signed to play in the United Football League. He was released by the Hartford Colonials on June 16, 2010.

=== Omaha Nighthwaks ===
Putzier played in the 2010 UFL season with the Omaha Nighthawks. On October 2, Putzier caught a game-winning touchdown from Jeff Garcia to defeat the Sacramento Mountain Lions. Putzier tied for the league lead in receiving touchdowns in 2010, scoring three on the year.

== Personal life ==
Putzier also played basketball at Boise State and majored in English.

Putzier is married, divorced and remarried. Due to concussions and cortisone shots, he had to quit his job for a medical equipment company. After a suicide attempt, Putzier was later diagnosed with post-concussion syndrome.
