= Rocky Mountain High School (Idaho) =

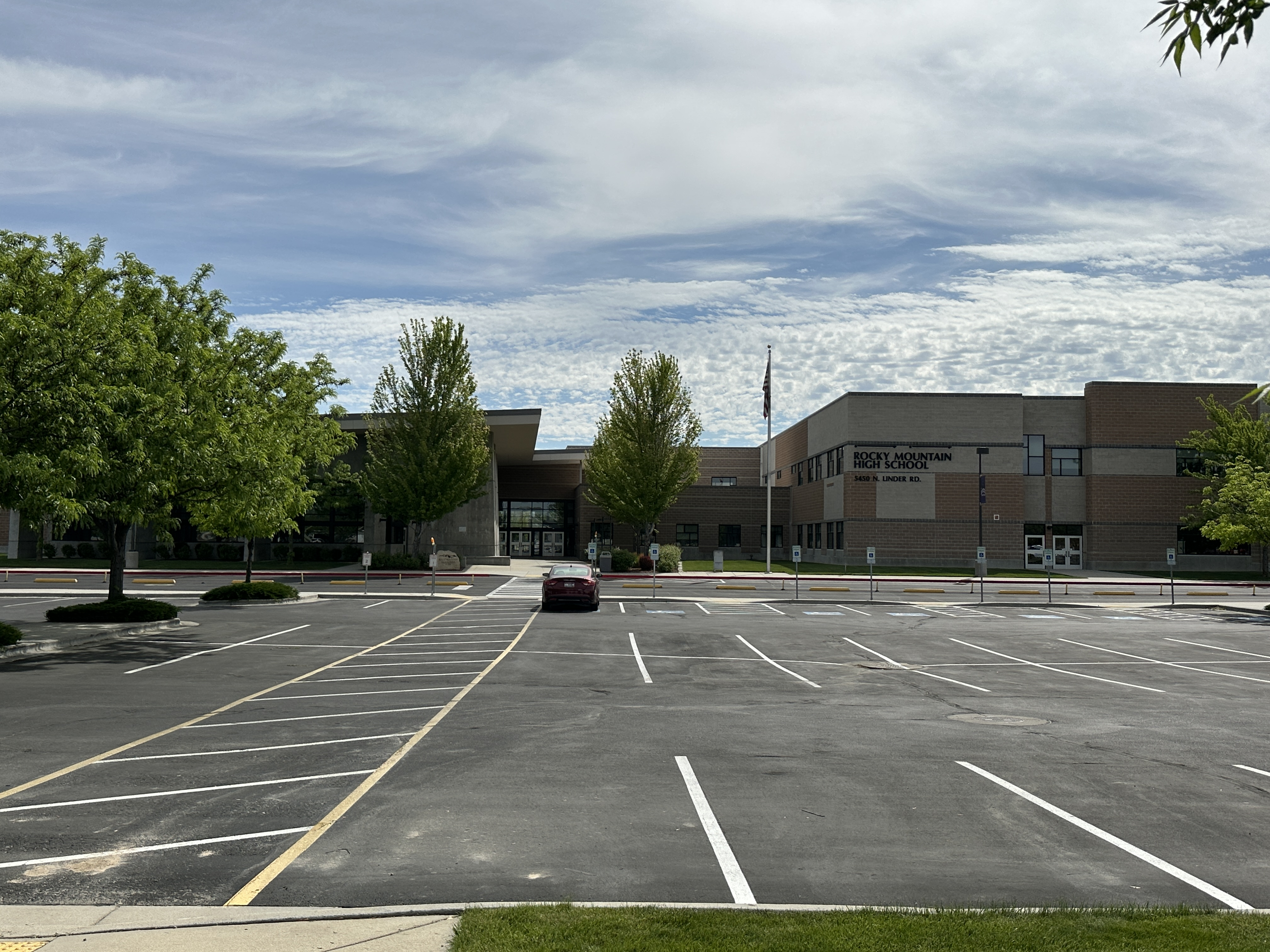
- View from west of main entrance in 2025

Location
- 5450 North Linder Road; Meridian, Idaho 83646; United States; 43°39′14″N 116°24′43″W

Information
- Type: Public
- Established: 2008; 18 years ago
- School district: West Ada S.D. (#2)
- Principal: Scott Connors
- Teaching staff: 80.42 (FTE)
- Grades: 9–12
- Enrollment: 1,848 (2024–2025)
- Student to teacher ratio: 22.98
- Colors: Purple, black, and silver
- Athletics: IHSAA Class 5A
- Athletics conference: Southern Idaho (6A) (SIC)
- Nickname: Grizzlies
- Elevation: 2,570 ft (783 m) AMSL
- Website: www.westada.org/o/rmhs

Rocky Mountain High School is a four-year public secondary school in Meridian, Idaho, west of Boise. Opened in the fall of 2008, it is the fifth of six traditional high schools in the West Ada School District. As of 2015, Rocky Mountain has had the largest enrollment in the state, beating out neighboring rival Mountain View. The school colors are purple, black and silver and the mascot is a Grizzly bear.

== Demographics ==
The demographic breakdown of the 2,455 students enrolled in 2020-2021 was:

- Male - 51.4%
- Female - 48.6%
- Native American/Alaskan - 0.2%
- Native Hawaiian/Pacific islanders - 0.5%
- Asian - 2.0%
- Black - 0.9%
- Hispanic - 8.8%
- White - 84.0%
- Two or More Races - 3.6%

14.1% of students were eligible for free or reduced lunch.

== Athletics ==
IHSAA Class 5A, District III
Southern Idaho Conference (5A) (SIC)

The Grizzlies have achieved notable success in cross country, with the boys' teams securing 5th (2018), 1st (2021), 3rd (2022, 2024), and 4th (2023) places at the NXR Northwest meet. Additionally, in 2021, the boys' team placed 22nd at the Garmin Runninglane Cross Country Championships.

The girls' teams have finished 4th twice (2022, 2023), 2nd once (2021), and 1st once (2024) at the NXR Northwest meet.

=== State titles ===
Boys

- Soccer (1): 2018
- Football (3): 2015, 2018, 2020
- Basketball (2): 2017, 2018
- Cross Country (6): 2012, 2016, 2017, 2018, 2021, 2022
- Baseball (2): 2012, 2017
- Tennis: 2022
- Track (9): 2011, 2012, 2013, 2014, 2016, 2017, 2018, 2019, 2021
- Hockey (3): 2017, 2018, 2019

Girls

- Soccer (3): 2011, 2018, 2019
- Volleyball (1): 2010
- Marching Band (1): 2026

== Notable Alumni ==
- Rasean Jones (2026), college football player
