= Eagle High School =

Public secondary school in Eagle, Idaho

Location
- 574 N. Park Lane; Eagle, Idaho; United States; 43.701°N 116.402°W

Information
- Type: Public, four-year
- Established: 1995; 31 years ago
- School district: West Ada S.D. (#2)
- Principal: Susan McInerney
- Teaching staff: 80.15 (FTE)
- Grades: 9–12
- Enrollment: 1,803 (2023–2024)
- Student to teacher ratio: 22.50
- Colors: Green & silver
- Athletics: IHSAA Class 6A
- Athletics conference: Southern Idaho (5A) (SIC)
- Mascot: Mustang
- Newspaper: Stampede
- Yearbook: Legacy
- Feeder schools: Eagle Middle School, Star Middle School
- Elevation: 2,530 ft (770 m) AMSL
- Website: www.westada.org/ehs

Eagle High School (EHS) is a four-year public secondary school in Eagle, Idaho, United States, a suburb northwest of Boise. EHS opened 31 years ago in August 1995, the third of six traditional high schools in the West Ada School District. The school colors are green and silver and its mascot is a mustang. Eagle's enrollment in 2019 was approximately 2,100.

== Awards and recognition ==
In 2006, the Eagle High School Broadcasting program, overseen by Jim Seaney and run by Nigel Goodwin, won a National High School Division Emmy for public service announcements on teen dating violence.

In 1996, Eagle High School choirs began to win trophies under the direction of R. John Hamilton. Notable achievements that year included the Sweepstakes (all-division) award for the varsity women's jazz choir and a first place division award for the varsity jazz choir at the historic Lionel Hampton Jazz Festival at the University of Idaho, Moscow.

Starting in 2003, with the hiring of Seth McMullen (former Idaho ACDA president) as choral director, the Eagle High School choral union became a powerhouse and received awards and commendations for excellence at local and regional choral festivals, including invitations to perform at the Idaho Music Educator Association's 2004 state conference and the 2008 ACDA NW Conference in Vancouver.

In 2010, the Eagle High School Orchestra won first place in its division at Heritage Festival after performing at Fullerton College. After the performance the orchestra was allowed to apply to visit and perform at Carnegie Hall as part of the 2011 National Invitational Bands & Orchestra Festival. Eagle High was one of the 17 high schools allowed to go and play at Carnegie hall out of the 500 that applied. Finally in 2012, the Eagle High School Orchestra competed at the Heritage Festival in Anaheim, California, and won first place along with other awards.

Eagle High School's band program has doubled in enrollment since the arrival of director T.J. Eriksen in fall 2008. The EHS Band program offers four academic ensembles including Varsity Marching/Symphonic band, Varsity Jazz Band (Eagle High School Jazz Orchestra), Concert Band and Jazz band II. In spring 2012, the Varsity Jazz Band was invited to perform at the Idaho Music Education Association conference in Coeur d'Alene. The following fall, the Thundering Mustang Band was featured in a performance with the Boise Philharmonic. The Thundering Mustang Band has won many division titles and captions at regional marching competitions. Through a local grant, the EHS band program has had musicians from the Boise Philharmonic woodwind quintet and brass quintet in the classroom for sectionals, side-by-side rehearsals and performances twice a year since 2010.

In support of creating new music, the EHS band program has commissioned four original works since 2009.

In 2011, The Eagle High Drama Class won State Championship under the direction of Tracy Harrison.

In 2010 and 2011, the Eagle High Speech and Debate Team won the state debate competition.

== Athletics ==
Eagle competes in athletics in Idaho High School Activities Association Class 5A for the largest schools in the state. EHS is a member of the Southern Idaho Conference (5A) (SIC), the state's largest and most competitive conference.

=== State titles ===
Boys

- Football (3): 1998 (4A), 2001, 2009
- Wrestling (4): 2001, 2003, 2004, 2005
- Baseball (2): 2003, 2011
- Golf (7): 2008, 2010, 2011, 2012, 2013, 2014, 2015
- Cross country (1): 2010
- Track and field (6): 2000, 2001, 2002, 2003, 2008, 2010

Girls

- Soccer (2): 2004, 2005
- Volleyball (5): 2002, 2006, 2007, 2008, 2009
- Softball (5): 2000, 2002, 2003, 2004, 2008
- Golf (1): 2003
- Track and field (5): 1997, 2002, 2009, 2010, 2013
- Cheer (3): Co-ed 2005, All-girl 2006, 2008

In 2006, Eagle High School was the first high school in Idaho to install an artificial turf football field on its campus. The project cost $500,000 and was funded entirely by donations, half of which was raised by the Eagle High Booster Club.

== Notable alumni ==
- Luke Barats, member of the Spokane-based sketch-comedy duo Barats and Bereta
- Erik Fisher, alpine ski racer, U.S. Ski Team
- Taylor Kelly, Arizona State quarterback
- Jeb Putzier, former NFL tight end
- Derek Schouman, former NFL tight end for the New Orleans Saints
- Scott Jorgensen, Mixed Martial Arts fighter
