= Meridian, Idaho =

City in Idaho, United States

- City
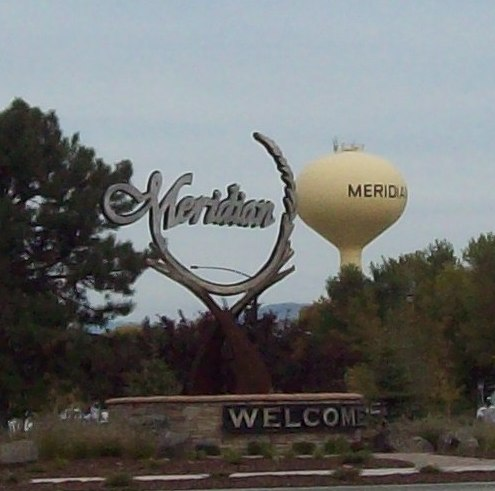
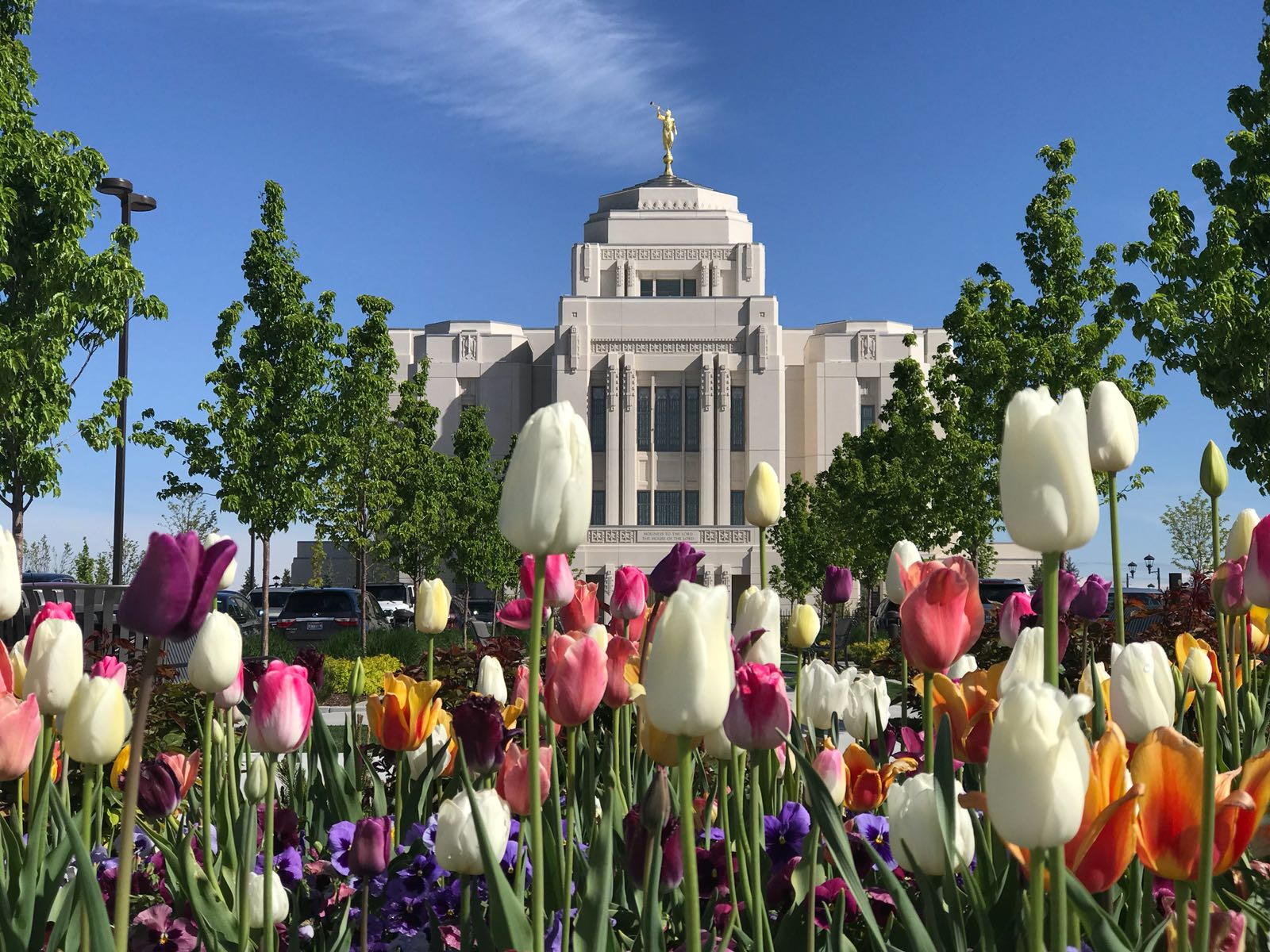
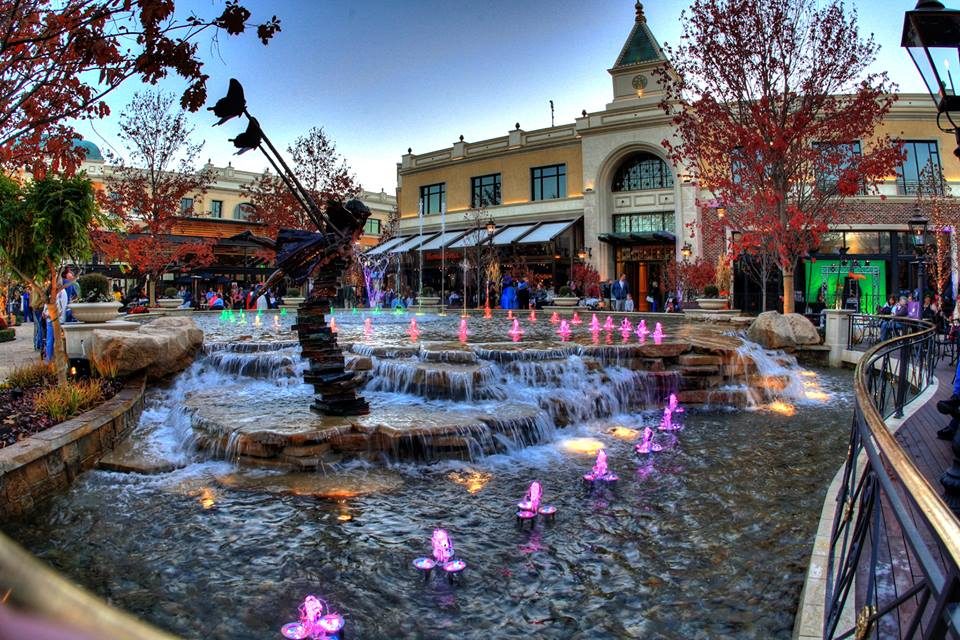
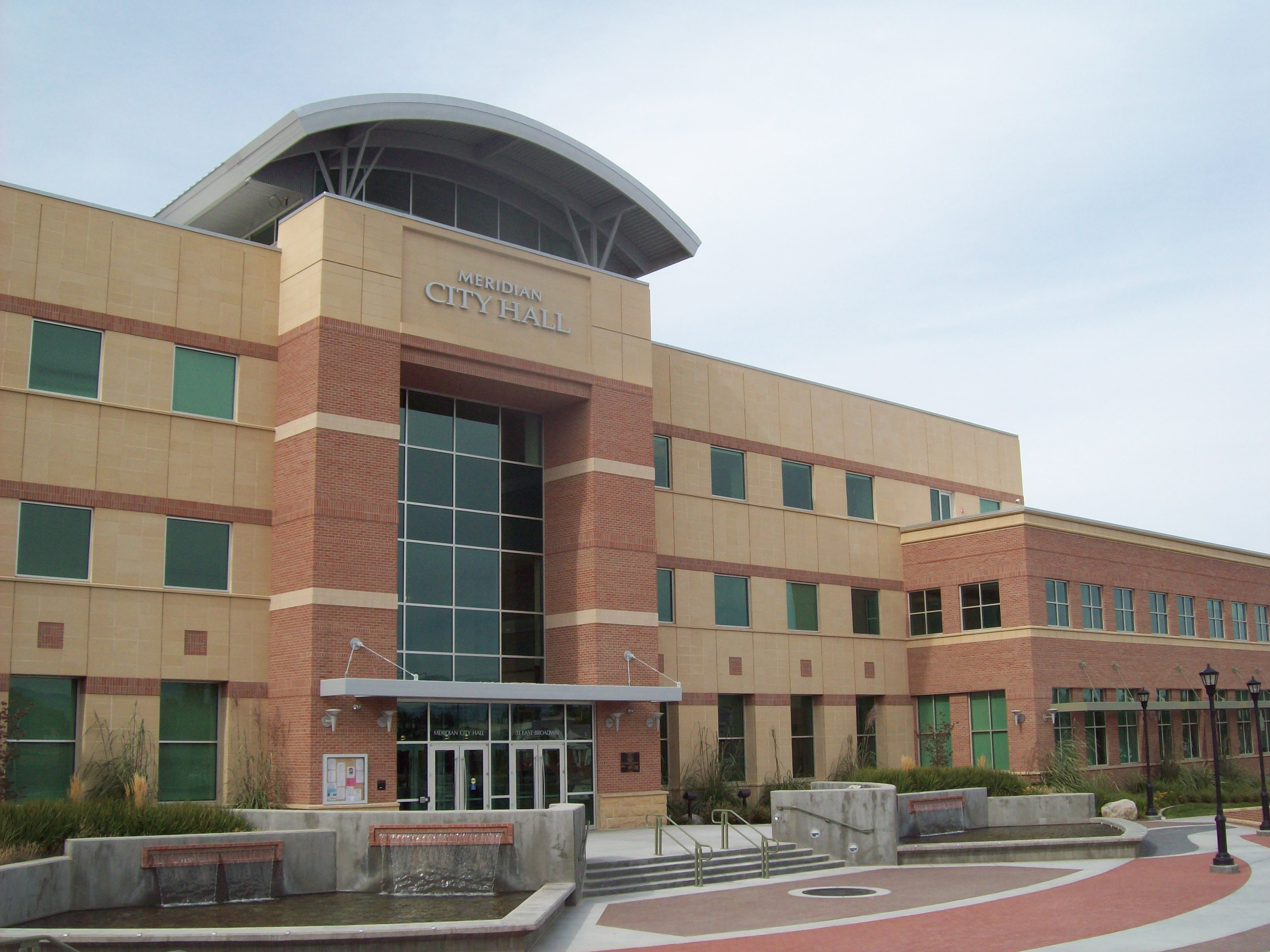

- Flag Logo
- Nickname: The Center of the Treasure Valley
- Motto: "Built for business . . . designed for living"
- Location of Meridian in Ada County, Idaho
- Coordinates: 43°36′51″N 116°23′56″W
- Country: United States
- State: Idaho
- County: Ada
- Established: 1891
- Founded: 1893
- Incorporated as a village: 1903
- Incorporated as a city: 1909

Area
  - City: 36.39 sq mi (94.25 km^{2})
  - Land: 36.31 sq mi (94.05 km^{2})
  - Water: 0.077 sq mi (0.20 km^{2})
- Elevation: 2,599 ft (792 m)

Population (2020)
  - City: 117,635
  - Estimate (2024): 139,740
  - Rank: US: 212th ID: 2nd
  - Density: 3,567/sq mi (1,377.1/km^{2})
  - Urban: 433,180 (US: 94th)
  - Metro: 811,336 (US: 75th)
  - Combined: 899,574 (US: 67th)
- Time zone: UTC–7 (Mountain (MST))
  - Summer (DST): UTC–6 (MDT)
- ZIP Codes: 83642, 83646, 83680
- Area codes: 208 and 986
- FIPS code: 16-52120
- GNIS feature ID: 2411083
- Website: meridiancity.org

Meridian is a city located in Ada County, Idaho, United States. The population was 117,635 at the 2020 census, making it the second most populous city in the county and Idaho, after Boise, the state capital. Meridian is considered the state's fastest-growing city and among the fastest-growing cities in the United States.

== History ==
The information in the following sections (Irrigation, Village, Rail Transportation, and Creamery) is found on the displays in the Meridian City Hall Plaza.

=== Irrigation (1890– ) ===
Early settlers arriving in the area came with no knowledge of gravity flow irrigation. Their previous homes were in areas where rain provided the needed moisture to raise crops. Irrigation soon became a necessity, since having a water source was a requirement for receiving the patent for the land from the U.S. Land Office. Irrigation districts, such as the Nampa-Meridian and Settlers irrigation districts, continue to serve the immediate Meridian area.

The town was established in 1891 on the Onweiler farm north of the present site and was called Hunter. Two years later an I.O.O.F. lodge was organized and called itself Meridian because it was located on the Boise Meridian, and the town was renamed. The Settlers' Irrigation Ditch, 1892, changed the arid region into a productive farming community which was incorporated in 1902.

=== Village (1903–41) ===
The original Meridian town site was filed in 1893 on homestead grant land belonging to Eliza Ann Zenger. Her husband, Christian, filed the plat with county officials and called it Meridian. The early settlers, many of whom were relatives, left their homes in Missouri to go west, either by wagon, train, or immigrant railroad car, bringing their lodge and church preferences with them. They established local institutions soon after arriving and filed for homestead lands. Meridian was incorporated in 1903.

Around the start of the 20th century, settlers established fruit orchards and built fruit packing businesses and prune dryers along the railroad tracks. Local orchards produced many varieties of apples and Italian prunes. Production continued through the mid-1940s when it was no longer profitable and the businesses closed. In 1941, Meridian's status changed from a village to a city.

=== Rail transportation (1908–28) ===
Following the raising of $4,000 to lay the Interurban rail line from Onweiler (Meridian and Ustick Roads), the tracks were completed into the village center. Turning east on Broadway and ending at East Second, the last car would spend the night in Meridian before returning to Boise early the next morning with passengers and freight. The interurban Station and Generator building (west one-third of the old library at Meridian and Idaho Streets) was built in 1912, and the line continued on to Nampa via Meridian. The tracks down Broadway were not used after 1912. The Interurban Company entered into receivership and closed in 1928 after 20 years of providing continuous transportation to neighboring towns. It was Meridian's main connection to the area outside the local community.

The Union Pacific Railroad spur opened in 1900 and is currently operated by the Boise Valley Railroad. Many industrial customers continue to ship forest, agricultural, and chemical products along this corridor.

=== Creamery (1929–70) ===
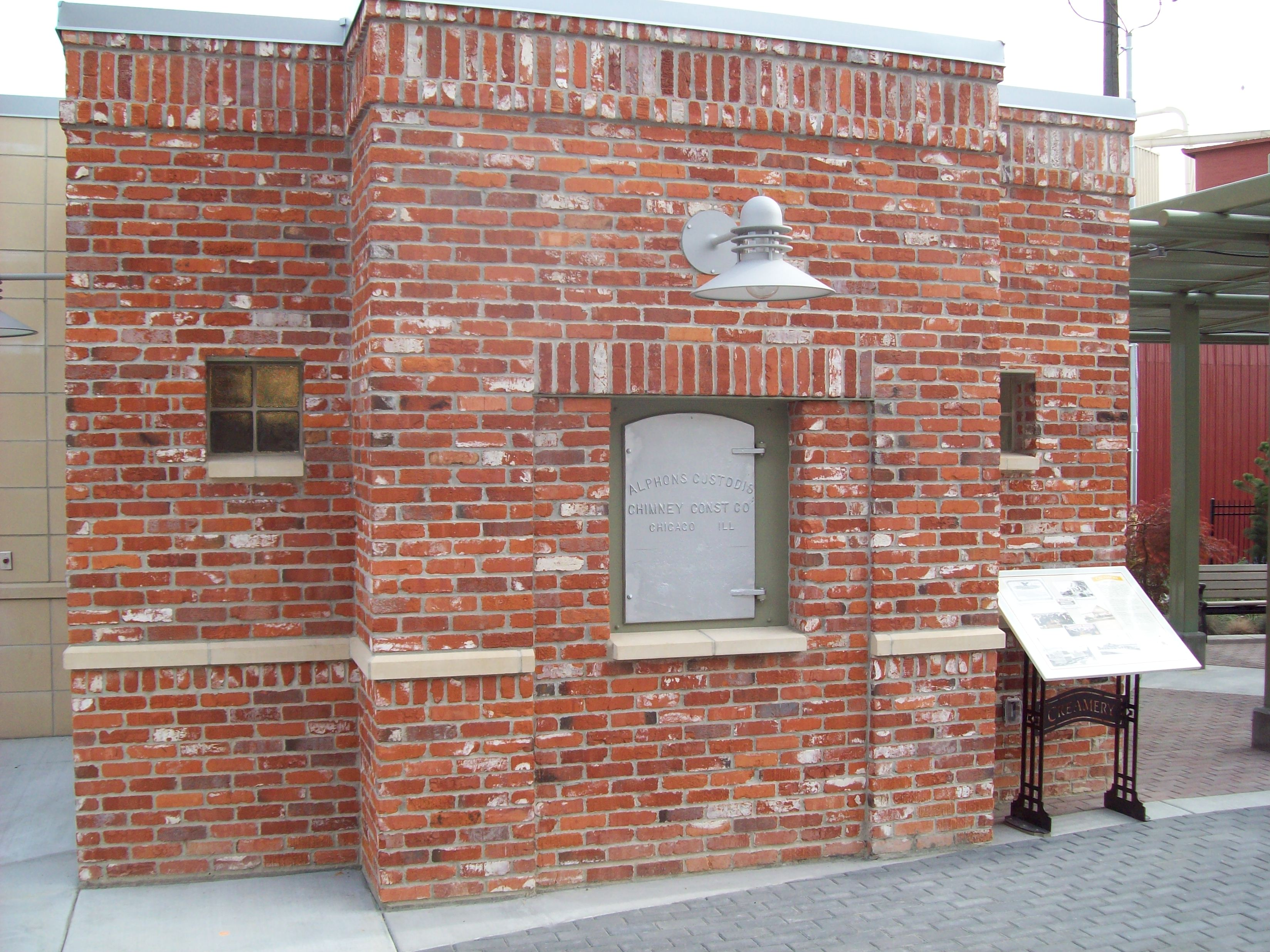
Heritage Pavilion, Meridian City Hall Plaza. The bricks are from the original creamery.

The city's official website describes the history of the Ada County Dairymen's cooperative creamery as follows:

The lowest days of the Great Depression brightened for area dairymen when the Ada County Dairymen's cooperative creamery began operation in 1929. It provided milk checks to those who were members of the cooperative, enabling them to pay their taxes and provide food for their families. Other community members hauled milk to the creamery and were employed by the creamery, whose product was Challenge Butter.

The creamery ran seven days a week for 40 years. Additions and improvements were made while the plant was in full operation. Later years saw the Wyeth Laboratories affiliate with the creamery to manufacture SMA baby formula. After the creamery ceased local operations in 1970, the dairymen shipped their milk to the Caldwell creamery for processing.

== Geography ==
According to the United States Census Bureau, the city has a total area of 26.84 square miles (69.52 km^{2}), of which, 26.79 square miles (69.39 km^{2}) is land and 0.05 square miles (0.13 km^{2}) is water.

The majority of Meridian lies on a flat plain, roughly in the north central part of Treasure Valley. There is a low bench along the south east edge of the city. The city is crossed by several irrigation canals that generally run from the south east to the north west. The Boise River runs north of the city. The Snake River runs far south of the city. Squaw Butte is visible to the north at 5,873 feet (1,790 m). Shafer Butte is visible to the north east at 7,572 feet (2,308 m). The Owyhee Mountains are visible to the far south.

=== Climate ===
Meridian's climate is characterized as semi-arid with four distinct seasons. Meridian experiences hot and dry summers where temperatures can often exceed 100 °F (38 °C), as well as cold winters with occasional light snowfall. Rainfall is usually infrequent and light, usually averaging less than an inch (25.4 mm) per month. December is the wettest month with an average of 1.55 inches (39 mm) of precipitation, and August is the driest month with 0.24 inches (6.1 mm). Spring and fall are generally temperate.

Climate data for Meridian, Idaho
Month	Jan	Feb	Mar	Apr	May	Jun	Jul	Aug	Sep	Oct	Nov	Dec	Year
Record high °F (°C)	63 (17)	71 (22)	81 (27)	92 (33)	99 (37)	109 (43)	111 (44)	110 (43)	102 (39)	94 (34)	78 (26)	65 (18)	111 (44)
Mean daily maximum °F (°C)	38 (3)	45 (7)	55 (13)	62 (17)	72 (22)	81 (27)	91 (33)	90 (32)	79 (26)	65 (18)	48 (9)	37 (3)	64 (18)
Mean daily minimum °F (°C)	25 (−4)	28 (−2)	34 (1)	39 (4)	47 (8)	54 (12)	60 (16)	60 (16)	51 (11)	41 (5)	32 (0)	24 (−4)	41 (5)
Record low °F (°C)	−17 (−27)	−15 (−26)	6 (−14)	19 (−7)	22 (−6)	31 (−1)	35 (2)	34 (1)	23 (−5)	11 (−12)	−3 (−19)	−25 (−32)	−25 (−32)
Average precipitation inches (mm)	1.24 (31)	1.03 (26)	1.39 (35)	1.23 (31)	1.39 (35)	0.69 (18)	0.33 (8.4)	0.24 (6.1)	0.58 (15)	0.75 (19)	1.35 (34)	1.55 (39)	11.77 (297.5)

== Demographics ==
Historical population
Census	Pop.	Note	%±
1910	619		—
1920	1,000		61.6%
1930	1,004		0.4%
1940	1,465		45.9%
1950	1,810		23.5%
1960	2,081		15.0%
1970	2,616		25.7%
1980	6,658		154.5%
1990	9,596		44.1%
2000	34,919		263.9%
2010	75,092		115.0%
2020	117,635		56.7%
2025 (est.)	142,988		21.6%
U.S. Decennial Census; 2020 Census

=== Racial and ethnic composition ===
Meridian, Idaho – racial and ethnic composition Note: the US Census treats Hispanic/Latino as an ethnic category. This table excludes Latinos from the racial categories and assigns them to a separate category. Hispanics/Latinos may be of any race.
Race / ethnicity (NH = Non-Hispanic)	Pop 2000	Pop 2010	Pop 2020	% 2000	% 2010	% 2020
White alone (NH)	32,270	66,123	95,526	92.41%	88.06%	81.21%
Black or African American alone (NH)	155	518	1,086	0.44%	0.69%	0.92%
Native American or Alaska Native alone (NH)	143	271	396	0.41%	0.36%	0.34%
Asian alone (NH)	432	1,312	2,938	1.24%	1.75%	2.50%
Pacific Islander alone (NH)	39	102	264	0.11%	0.14%	0.22%
Other race alone (NH)	20	87	513	0.06%	0.12%	0.44%
Mixed-race or multiracial (NH)	569	1,568	5,684	1.63%	2.09%	4.83%
Hispanic or Latino (any race)	1,291	5,111	11,228	3.70%	6.81%	9.54%
Total	34,919	75,092	117,635	100.00%	100.00%	100.00%

=== 2020 census ===
As of the census of 2020, there were 117,635 people and 48,434 households residing in the city.

=== 2010 census ===
As of the census of 2010, there were 75,092 people, 25,302 households, and 19,916 families living in the city. The population density was 2,803.0 inhabitants per square mile (1,082.2/km^{2}). There were 26,674 housing units at an average density of 995.7 per square mile (384.4/km^{2}). The racial makeup of the city was 92.0% White, 0.8% African American, 0.5% Native American, 1.8% Asian, 0.1% Pacific Islander, 1.9% from other races, and 2.9% from two or more races. Hispanic or Latino people of any race were 6.8% of the population.

There were 25,302 households, of which 47.6% had children under the age of 18 living with them, 63.9% were married couples living together, 10.4% had a female householder with no husband present, 4.4% had a male householder with no wife present, and 21.3% were non-families. Of all households, 16.6% were made up of individuals, and 6% had someone living alone who was 65 years of age or older. The average household size was 2.96 and the average family size was 3.33.

The median age in the city was 32.5 years. 33.4% of residents were under the age of 18; 6.6% were between the ages of 18 and 24; 30.5% were from 25 to 44; 20.7% were from 45 to 64; and 8.9% were 65 years of age or older. The gender makeup of the city was 49.0% male and 51.0% female.

=== 2000 census ===
As of the census of 2000, there were 34,919 people, 11,829 households, and 9,515 families living in the city. The population density was 2,962.1/sq mi. There were 12,293 housing units at an average density of 1,042.8 per square mile. The racial makeup of the city was 96.3% White, 0.7% African American, 1% Native American, 2% Asian, 0.3% Pacific Islander, 1.9% from other races, and 2.12% from two or more races. Hispanic or Latino people of any race were 3.7% of the population.

There were 11,829 households, out of which 49% had children under the age of 18 living with them, 68.4% were married couples living together, 8.8% had a female householder with no husband present, and 19.6% were non-families. Of all households, 14.5% were made up of individuals, and 4.3% had someone living alone who was 65 years of age or older. The average household size was 2.93 and the average family size was 3.26.

In the city, the population was spread out, with 33.7% under the age of 18, 6.9% from 18 to 24, 37.1% from 25 to 44, 15.8% from 45 to 64, and 6.4% who were 65 years of age or older. The median age was 30 years. For every 100 females, there were 96.4 males. For every 100 females age 18 and over, there were 93.7 males.

The median income for a household in the city was $53,276, and the median income for a family was $57,077. Males had a median income of $40,360 versus $27,174 for females. The per capita income for the city was $20,150. About 4.6% of families and 5.6% of the population were below the poverty line, including 7.0% of those under age 18 and 7.6% of those age 65 or over.

== Economy ==
Blue Cross of Idaho, Jacksons Food Stores, and Scentsy are based in Meridian. The Idaho State Police is headquartered in Meridian and the state police academy is housed on its campus. All police officers statewide are required to attend basic training at the facility.

The Village at Meridian opened in 2013, and includes retail and restaurants.

== Government ==
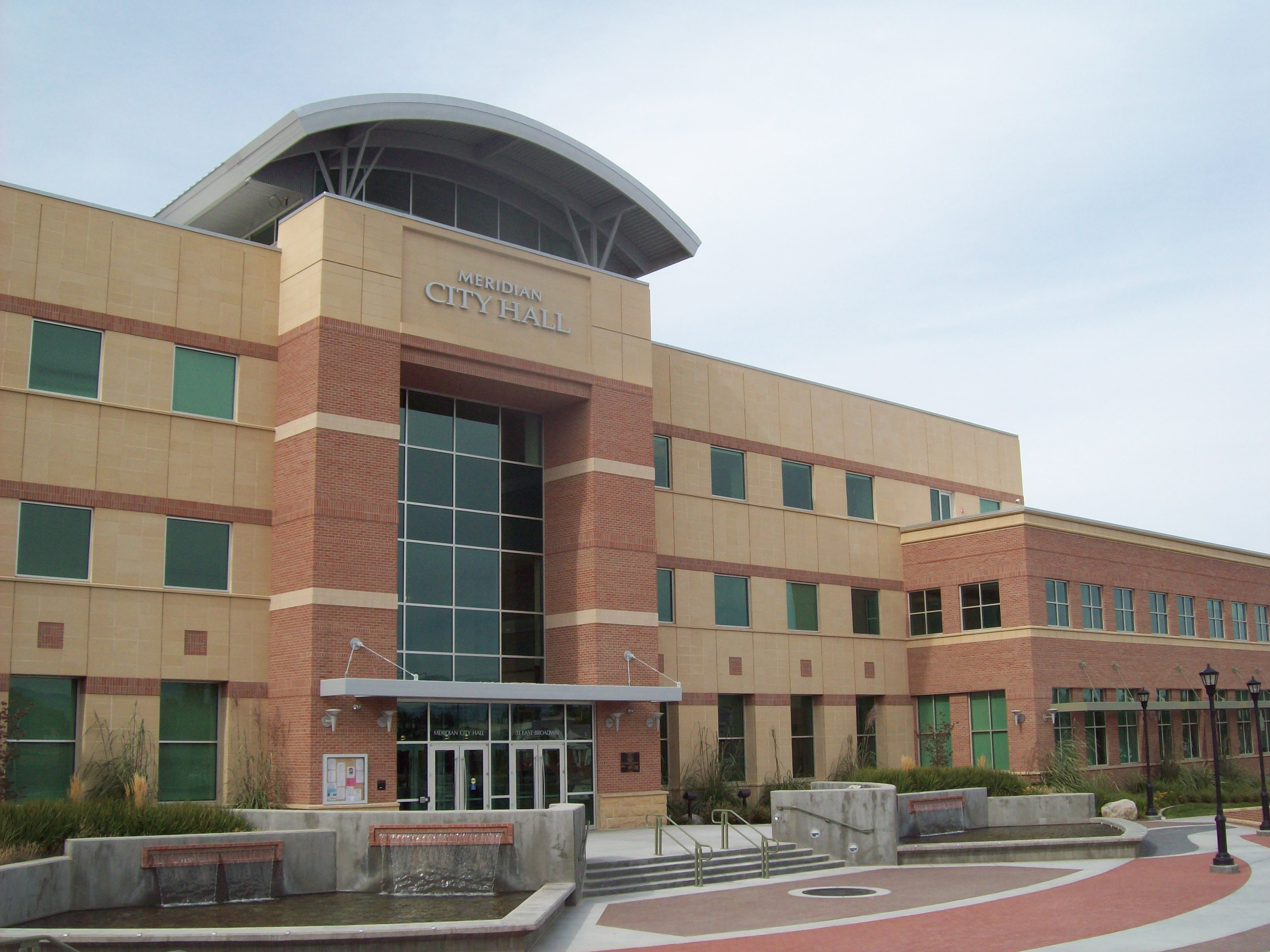
Meridian City Hall

Meridian has a mayor who serves four-year terms and received an annual salary of $90,956 in 2018. Meridian has a city council of six members. Every two years, three city council seats are up for re-election. Members of the council serve four-year terms and received annual compensation of $10,000 as of 2018.

The mayor, with the consent of the city council, appoints the following officers:

- City attorney
- Public Works director
- Chief of police
- Fire chief
- Planning director
- Parks and Rec director
- Chief financial officer
- Chief information officer
- Human resources director

=== Mayors ===
- W. L. Lawson, c.1941–1943
- Arthur G. Postlethwaite, c.1950–1953
- Don M. Storey, c.1953–1979
- Joe Glaisyer, c.1979–1983
- Grant Kingsford, 1983–1995
- Bob Corrie, c.1996–2002
- Tammy de Weerd, c.2004–2019
- Robert Simison, 2020–present

== Arts and culture ==
The Meridian Symphony Orchestra celebrated its twentieth anniversary season in 2009–10. Art is on display in the Initial Point Gallery on the third floor of the Meridian City Hall. The gallery is open to the public, with free admission.

=== In popular culture ===
The Clint Eastwood film Bronco Billy (1980) was partially filmed in Meridian.

The book series Michael Vey by Richard Paul Evans is partially set in Meridian, with significant events occurring within the area in the first book of the series: Michael Vey: The Prisoner of Cell 25.

== Parks and recreation ==
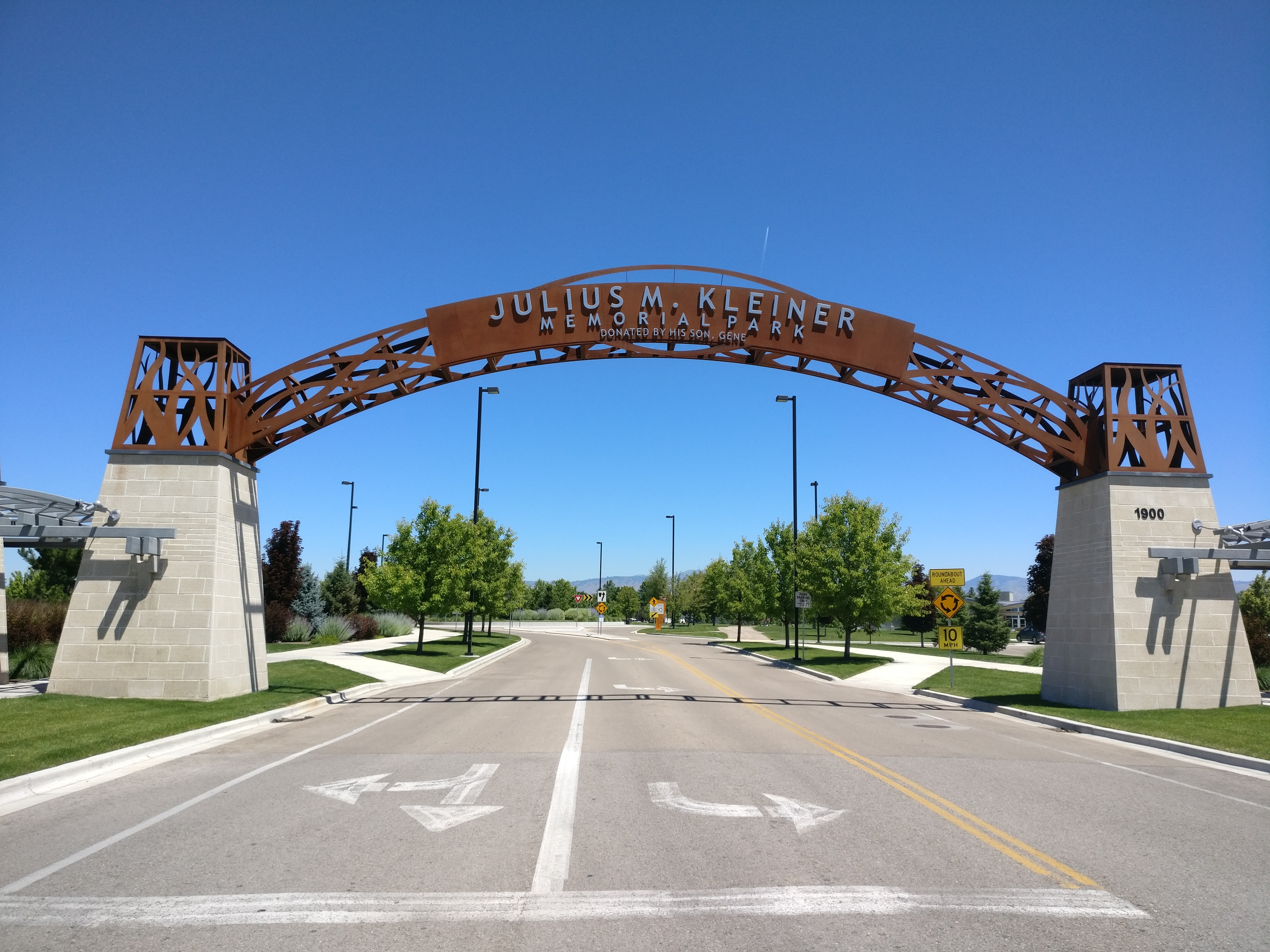
The main entrance to the 60 acres (24 ha) Julius M. Kleiner Memorial Park

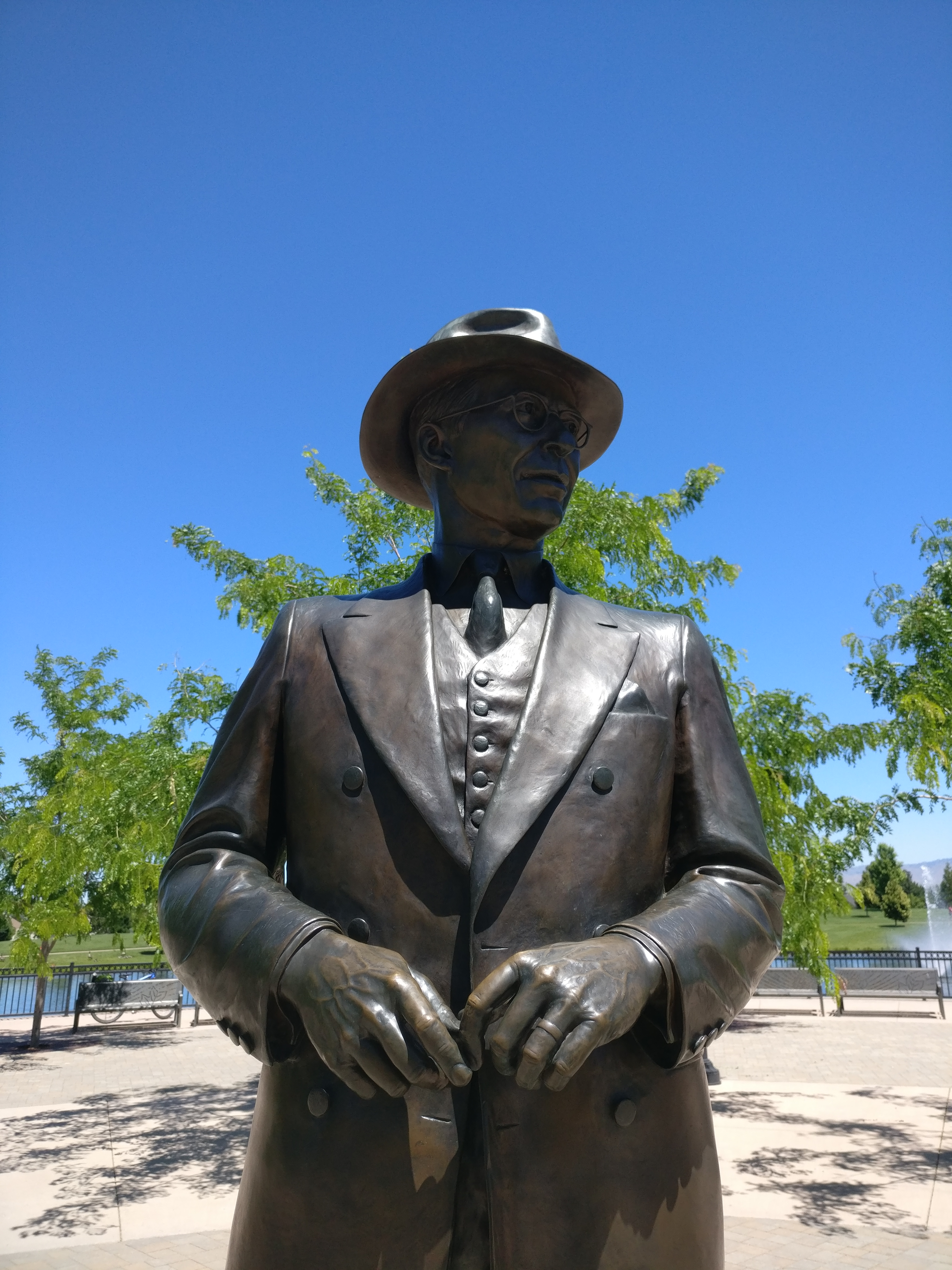
The bronze statue of Julius M. Kleiner in the park which bears his name, based on a 1940s photograph taken at an agricultural fair, where he bought a prize cow

The city's Parks and Recreation department manages seventeen public parks throughout Meridian including Meridian Settlers Regional Park which hosts free outdoor movies during the summer months.

The Meridian Speedway lies within city limits directly south of Old Town Meridian.

Meridian shares boundaries with the largest and third largest cities in Idaho, Boise to the east and Nampa to the west. Therefore, residents of Meridian often take advantage of the recreation and sports opportunities in those cities.

Eagle Island State Park is about 2.5 miles (4.0 km) north of Meridian and includes a man-made lake with a beach, equestrian and hiking trails, and fishing. The Snake River Birds of Prey National Conservation Area is south of Meridian.

== Education ==
The West Ada School District which includes almost all of Meridian, serves the city and is the largest in the state.

Meridian extends into the Kuna Joint School District 3.

Meridian Joint School District 2 spends $6,941 per student, the least amount of money per student out of any school district in the United States.

== Infrastructure ==
=== Transportation ===
The majority of the city lies north of I-84. Streets are named with a north, south, east or west prefix identifying the orientation of the street and where the street is in relation to the intersection of Franklin Road and Meridian Road. Roads with a north prefix are north of Franklin Road (which runs east and west). Roads with a west prefix are west of Meridian Road (which runs north and south). Many residents identify which section of the city they live in by the closest intersection of major roads that are generally laid out in square miles. From west to east, the major roads are Black Cat, Ten Mile, Linder, Meridian, Locust Grove, and Eagle. From north to south, the major roads are Chinden (Highway 20/26), McMillan, Ustick, Cherry (west of Meridian) or Fairview (east of Meridian), Franklin, Overland, Victory, and Amity.

I-84 is between Franklin and Overland. Pine is another major road that runs east/west and lies between Cherry and Franklin.

A railroad line runs east/west and lies between Pine and Franklin. Most of the city's industrial areas are concentrated along this railroad line with some other industrial areas near the east side of the city south west of the intersection of Fairview and Eagle. The line was formerly owned by Union Pacific, but Boise Valley Railroad now owns the line, running trains on weekdays from Boise to Nampa.

Old-town Meridian centers around the intersection of Main Street and Pine Street. In the older section of the city, there are numbered streets up to 15th Street to the west and up to 5th Street to the east.

== Notable people ==
- William Agee, business executive
- Marie Devereux, actress and model
- Russ Fulcher, U.S. congressman from Idaho
- Mike Gabler, winner of Survivor 43
- Wilbert Lee Gore, creator of Gore-Tex
- Davey Hamilton, Indy 500 driver
- Vern Law, Major League Baseball player
- Spencer Nead, former fullback for the New England Patriots
- Ron Packard, former congressman from California, born in Meridian
- Gracie Pfost, first woman elected to Congress from Idaho
- Randy Tolsma, NASCAR driver
- Scott Yenor, professor at Boise State University
