= 2020–21 BYU Cougars men's basketball team =

2020–21 BYU Cougars men's basketball

NCAA tournament, First Round
- Conference: West Coast Conference

Ranking
- AP: No. 23
- Record: 20–7 (10–3 WCC)
- Head coach: Mark Pope (2nd season)
- Assistant coaches: Chris Burgess (2nd season); Cody Fueger (2nd season); Nick Robinson (2nd season)
- Home arena: Marriott Center (Capacity: 18,987)

2020–21 West Coast Conference men's basketball standings
	Conf.				Overall
Team	W		L	PCT	W		L	PCT
No. 1 Gonzaga †	15	–	0	1.000	31	–	1	.969
No. 23 BYU	10	–	3	.769	20	–	7	.741
Loyola Marymount	7	–	5	.583	13	–	9	.591
Pepperdine	7	–	6	.538	15	–	12	.556
Pacific	6	–	7	.462	9	–	9	.500
Santa Clara	4	–	5	.444	12	–	8	.600
Saint Mary's	4	–	6	.400	14	–	10	.583
San Francisco	4	–	9	.308	11	–	14	.440
San Diego	2	–	7	.222	3	–	11	.214
Portland	0	–	11	.000	6	–	15	.286
† 2021 WCC tournament winner Rankings from AP poll

The 2020–21 BYU Cougars men's basketball team represented Brigham Young University in the 2020–21 NCAA Division I men's basketball season. It was head coach Mark Pope's second season as BYU's head coach and the Cougars tenth season as members of the West Coast Conference (WCC). The Cougars played their home games at the Marriott Center in Provo, Utah. They finished the season 20–7, 10–3 in WCC Play to finish in 2nd place. They beat Pepperdine in the semifinals of the WCC tournament before losing in the championship game to Gonzaga. They received an at-large bid to the NCAA tournament where they lost in the First Round to UCLA.

== Previous season ==
The Cougars finished the 2019–20 season 24–8, 13–3 in West Coast Conference play to finish in second place. As the No. 2 seed in the WCC Tournament, they lost to Saint Mary's in the semifinals. Despite being a virtual lock to receive an at-large bid to the NCAA tournament, all postseason play was cancelled amid the COVID-19 pandemic.

== Offseason ==
=== Departures ===
Seven seniors departed from the basketball team either to graduation or a completion of their college eligibility. Three of the seven were starters - Yoeli Childs, T. J. Haws and Jake Toolson and two of them were important bench players that saw significant playing time - Zac Seljaas and Dalton Nixon. These seniors contributed 70% of the scoring for the prior year team. Blaze Nield also left the team after entering the transfer portal in March 2020. In April, he transferred to Utah Valley University making it the third team Nield had played for in as many years. He played his freshman season at Utah State University Eastern in Price, Utah. Evan Troy will continue with the team as a graduate assistant.

Name	Number	Pos.	Height	Weight	Year	Hometown	Reason for departure
Zac Seljaas	2	G	6'7"	215	Senior	Bountiful, UT	Graduated
Blaze Nield	3	G	6'1"	185	Sophomore	Lehi, UT	Transferred to Utah Valley
Jake Toolson	5	G	6'5"	205	Senior (Redshirt)	Gilbert, AZ	Completed College Eligibility
Taylor Maughan	13	G	6'4"	200	Senior	Fullerton, CA	Graduated
Yoeli Childs	23	F	6'8"	225	Senior	South Jordan, UT	Graduated
Evan Troy	24	G	6'5"	180	Senior	Longview, WA	Graduated
T. J. Haws	30	G	6'4"	170	Senior	Alpine, UT	Graduated
Dalton Nixon	33	F	6'7"	215	Senior (Redshirt)	Orem, UT	Graduated

=== Incoming transfers ===
On October 18, 2019, Spencer Johnson announced his decision to transfer from Salt Lake Community College to BYU. Johnson had initially committed to Weber State in 2016, but when he returned from serving a mission in Milan, Italy, he transferred to Utah Valley University partway through his redshirt freshman year. Then he decided to transfer to Salt Lake Community College where he played his first season of college basketball. For the 2020–21 season, Johnson is a redshirt sophomore, initially with 3 seasons of eligibility remaining. On February 24, Gideon George from New Mexico Junior College announced his decision to transfer to BYU. He will transfer as a junior and initially had two years of eligibility remaining. On April 23, 2020, Purdue center Matt Haarms decided to transfer to BYU for his final year of eligibility. Haarms, reported as the nation's top available transfer at the time, had previously narrowed his choices to BYU, Kentucky and Texas Tech despite 25 or more schools contacting him regarding his decision. Because he is a graduate transfer, Haarms is eligible to play immediately. On June 12, 2020, it was announced that Brandon Averette would transfer from UVU to play his final year of college eligibility for BYU. Because Averette is a graduate transfer, he is eligible to play for the 2020–21 season. In June 2020 Brandon Warr was reported to have transferred to BYU from Westminster College as a walk-on. Warr will redshirt the 2020–21 season and play what was intended to be his final year of college eligibility during the 2021–22 season.

On October 14, 2020, the NCAA announced that all student-athletes involved in winter sports in 2020–21, including men's and women's basketball, would receive an extra year of eligibility, regardless of whether they or their teams actually participated in the 2020–21 season. This special rule, introduced due to COVID-19, allows five years of eligibility for student-athletes instead of the normal four. All entries in the "Years Remaining" column reflect this policy.

Name	Number	Pos.	Height	Weight	Year	Hometown	Previous School	Years Remaining	Date Eligible	Walk On/ Scholarship	Rivals	247Sports	ESPN	ESPN Grade
Brandon Warr	2	G	6'5"	210	Senior	Salt Lake City, UT	Westminster College	2	October 1, 2021	Walk On	N/A	N/A	N/A	N/A
Matt Haarms	3	C	7'3"	250	Senior (Redshirt)	Amsterdam, Netherlands	Purdue	2	October 1, 2020	Scholarship	3-star	3-star	4-star	80
Brandon Averette	4	G	5'11"	185	Senior (Redshirt)	Richardson, TX	Utah Valley	2	October 1, 2020	Scholarship	3-star	3-star	N/A	N/A
Gideon George	5	F	6'6"	180	Junior	Minna, Nigeria	New Mexico JC	3	October 1, 2020	Scholarship	N/A	N/A	N/A	N/A
Spencer Johnson	20	F	6'5"	175	Sophomore (Redshirt)	American Fork, UT	Salt Lake CC	4	October 1, 2020	Scholarship	N/A	N/A	N/A	N/A

=== Returned missionaries ===
One returned missionary was added to the roster for the 2020–21 season. Hunter Erickson wore #1 and played at Timpview High School averaging 22 points his junior season. He is a 6'3" guard and weighs in at 185 pounds. He also received scholarship offers from Utah, Cal State Northridge and UC Santa Barbara. Due to the special NCAA eligibility rules for 2020–21, he will have five years of eligibility instead of the normal four.

Name	Number	Pos.	Height	Weight	Year	Hometown	Previous School	Years Remaining	Recruiting Class	Rivals	247Sports	ESPN	ESPN Grade
Hunter Erickson	0	G	6'3"	185	Freshman	Provo, UT	Timpview	5	2017	3-star	3-star	2-star	N/A

=== Currently serving missionaries ===
During the 2020–21 season, there are four team members that are currently serving full-time missions. Each of the four players have four years of eligibility remaining and will be part of the roster for the 2021–22 season. Nate Hansen and Trey Stewart will hold scholarship positions while Casey Brown and Jeremy DowDell will join as preferred walk-ons.

Name	Number	Pos.	Height	Weight	Missionary Service Years	Mission Location	Hometown	Previous School	Years Remaining	Recruiting Class	Rivals	247Sports	ESPN	ESPN Grade
Casey Brown	–	G	6'3"	175	2019–20 & 2020–21	---	Pleasant Grove, UT	Pleasant Grove	4	2019	N/A	N/A	N/A	N/A
Nate Hansen	–	G	6'3"	165	2019–20 & 2020–21	Arkansas	Provo, UT	Timpview	4	2019	3-star	3-star	N/A	N/A
Trey Stewart	–	G	6'3"	195	2019–20 & 2020–21	England & Washington	American Fork, UT	American Fork	4	2019	N/A	N/A	4-star	80
Jeremy DowDell	–	G	6'3"	180	2019–20 & 2020–21	Argentina	Salt Lake City, UT	Olympus	4	2019	N/A	N/A	N/A	N/A

=== 2020 recruiting class ===
Six high school players committed to play for BYU from the 2020 recruiting class. Richie Saunders, Dallin Hall, Tanner Hayhurst and Tanner Toolson each plan to complete two-year full-time missionary service before joining the team for the 2022–23 season. Only Townsend Tripple and Caleb Lohner will join the roster for the 2020–21 season. Tripple had originally planned to complete missionary service before joining the team and was assigned to Argentina, but decided to delay his mission trip due to coronavirus and joined the roster as a walk-on. In early June, it was reported that Caleb Lohner, a four-star forward from Texas who had previously signed with Utah, requested a release from his National Letter of Intent to sign with BYU. Lohner was released, and on June 26 officially signed with the Cougars. Lohner will be a true freshman and is immediately eligible to play.

College recruiting
Name	Hometown	School	Height	Weight	Commit date
Richie Saunders; Guard	Mount Pleasant, Utah	Wasatch Academy	6 ft 5 in (1.96 m)	180 lb (82 kg)	Oct 30, 2019
Richie Saunders; Guard	Recruit ratings: Scout: Rivals: 247Sports: ESPN: (N/A)				
Dallin Hall; Guard	Ogden, Utah	Fremont High School	6 ft 3 in (1.91 m)	180 lb (82 kg)	Mar 13, 2020
Dallin Hall; Guard	Recruit ratings: Rivals: 247Sports: ESPN: (N/A)				
Townsend Tripple; Forward	Meridian, Idaho	Rocky Mountain High School	6 ft 8 in (2.03 m)	200 lb (91 kg)	Apr 13, 2020
Townsend Tripple; Forward	Recruit ratings: Scout: Rivals: 247Sports: ESPN: (N/A)				
Tanner Hayhurst; Guard	Eagle, Idaho	Eagle High School	6 ft 6 in (1.98 m)	175 lb (79 kg)	May 7, 2020
Tanner Hayhurst; Guard	Recruit ratings: Scout: Rivals: 247Sports: ESPN: (N/A)				
Tanner Toolson; Guard	Vancouver, Washington	Union High School	6 ft 5 in (1.96 m)	185 lb (84 kg)	May 14, 2020
Tanner Toolson; Guard	Recruit ratings: ESPN: (N/A)				
Caleb Lohner; Forward	Flower Mound, Texas	Wasatch Academy	6 ft 7 in (2.01 m)	200 lb (91 kg)	Jun 26, 2020
Caleb Lohner; Forward	Recruit ratings: Rivals: 247Sports: ESPN: (81)				
Overall recruit ranking: Scout: nr Rivals: nr 247Sports: nr
Note: In many cases, Scout, Rivals, 247Sports, On3, and ESPN may conflict in their listings of height and weight.; In these cases, the average was taken. ESPN grades are on a 100-point scale.; Sources: "BYU 2020 Basketball Commitments". Rivals.; "ESPN". ESPN.; "2020 Team Ranking". Rivals.com.; "2020 BYU Basketball Commits". 247Sports.

=== 2021 Recruiting class ===
Jake Wahlin committed to BYU in early September and officially signed on November 11, 2020. Wahlin was recruited by Arizona State, San Diego State and New Mexico as well as other schools. He plans to complete a mission trip and join the team for the 2023-24 season. In addition, forward Fousseyni Traore from Wasatch Academy signed with the Cougars on November 19, over schools such as Seton Hall and Utah State. He will join the program for the 2021-22 season. Atiki Ally Atiki, from the London Basketball Academy in Ontario, Canada, verbally committed to BYU on February 15, 2021 and will also join the program for the 2021-22 season.

College recruiting
Name	Hometown	School	Height	Weight	Commit date
Jake Wahlin; Forward	Provo, Utah	Timpview High School	6 ft 8 in (2.03 m)	195 lb (88 kg)	Sep 16, 2020
Jake Wahlin; Forward	Recruit ratings: Rivals: 247Sports: ESPN: (79)				
Fousseyni Traore; Forward	Bamako, Mali	Wasatch Academy	6 ft 7 in (2.01 m)	235 lb (107 kg)	Nov 19, 2020
Fousseyni Traore; Forward	Recruit ratings: No ratings found				
Atiki Ally Atiki; Center	Mwanza, Tanzania	London Basketball Academy (Ontario, Canada)	6 ft 11 in (2.11 m)	235 lb (107 kg)	Feb 15, 2021
Atiki Ally Atiki; Center	Recruit ratings: Rivals:				
Overall recruit ranking: Scout: nr Rivals: nr 247Sports: nr
Note: In many cases, Scout, Rivals, 247Sports, On3, and ESPN may conflict in their listings of height and weight.; In these cases, the average was taken. ESPN grades are on a 100-point scale.; Sources: "BYU 2021 Basketball Commitments". Rivals.; "ESPN". ESPN.; "2021 Team Ranking". Rivals.com.; "2021 BYU Basketball Commits". 247Sports.

=== Preseason polls and rankings ===
In late October, BYU was selected to finish second in the West Coast Conference in the Preseason Men's Basketball Coaches Poll behind Gonzaga. Alex Barcello was named to the 2020-2021 All-WCC Pre-season Men's Basketball Team.

2020-21 WCC Preseason Men's Basketball Coaches Poll
Rank	Team (First Place Votes)	Points
1.	Gonzaga (9)	81
2.	BYU (1)	69
3.	Saint Mary's	63
4.	Pepperdine	57
5.	San Francisco	52
6.	Santa Clara	38
7.	Loyola Marymount	33
8.	Pacific	31
8.	San Diego	16
10.	Portland	10

In early November, Matt Haarms was named as one of the preseason 20 players to watch regarding the Kareem Abdul-Jabbar Center of the Year Award. Throughout the preseason, several media outlets ranked BYU among the top 100 Division I college basketball preseason teams for the 2020-21 season. Consistent with the WCC preseason coaches poll, many of the writers projected BYU second among WCC teams. A summary of the various preseason rankings that included BYU is as follows:

Writer(s)	Organization/Metric	Date	BYU Overall Rank	BYU WCC Rank	Total # Teams Ranked	Notes/References
Joel Welser	College Sports Madness	September 25, 2020	#48	#2	144	Projected Postseason Tournament: NIT
Joe Lunardi	ESPN Bracketology	October 7, 2020	#44 (11-seed * 4 regions)	#2	68	Projected 11-seed in play-in game of NCAA Tournament
Bart Torvik	T-Rank	October 26, 2020	#50	#2	357	
Ken Pomeroy	KenPom	November 4, 2020	#89	#4	357	
Matt Norlander	CBS Sports	November 5, 2020	#51	#2	357	

=== Preseason injuries ===
Several players dealt with injuries during the off-season. Jesse Wade had for some time had a knee injury which has prevented him from playing for BYU since he transferred from Gonzaga. He sat out the 2018–19 season due to his transfer, but was not able to play during the 2019–20 season due to his knee injury. Wade was cleared by doctors to practice with the team on June 1, 2020. Alex Barcello injured his wrist during the game at Pepperdine on February 29, 2020, yet still played 33 minutes in the final game of the season in the WCC tournament against St. Mary's. Barcello later had surgery on his wrist and was expected to be ready for team practices on June 1, 2020. Connor Harding had lingering knee issues during the 2019–20 season. Harding had knee surgery during the summer and is expected to be available to play at the start of the season. Wyatt Lowell announced via Instagram that he was going to have shoulder surgery on July 22, 2020. Lowell indicated that he had torn his labrum the prior week playing basketball. He is expected to be recovering for several months. At a media availability interview on November 12, Mark Pope indicated that Townsend Tripple had recently injured his knee and would not be available to play at the start of the season.

== Roster ==
2020–21 BYU Cougars men's basketball team
Players
Coaches

Pos.	#	Name	Height	Weight	Year	Previous school	Hometown
G	0	Hunter Erickson	6 ft 3 in (1.91 m)	185 lb (84 kg)	Fr	Timpview	Provo, UT
F	1	Wyatt Lowell (injured)	6 ft 10 in (2.08 m)	205 lb (93 kg)	RS Jr	Williams Field; Utah Valley	Gilbert, AZ
G	2	Brandon Warr (W) (redshirt)	6 ft 5 in (1.96 m)	210 lb (95 kg)	Sr	Highland (UT); Westminster College	Salt Lake City, UT
C	3	Matt Haarms	7 ft 3 in (2.21 m)	250 lb (113 kg)	RS Sr	Sunrise Christian Academy; Purdue	Amsterdam, Netherlands
G	4	Brandon Averette	5 ft 11 in (1.8 m)	185 lb (84 kg)	RS Sr	Richardson; Oklahoma State; Utah Valley	Richardson, TX
F	5	Gideon George	6 ft 6 in (1.98 m)	220 lb (100 kg)	Jr	New Mexico JC	Minna, Nigeria
G	10	Jesse Wade (W)	6 ft 1 in (1.85 m)	175 lb (79 kg)	RS So	Davis; Gonzaga	Kaysville, UT
G	13	Alex Barcello	6 ft 2 in (1.88 m)	180 lb (82 kg)	Sr	Corona del Sol; Arizona	Chandler, AZ
G	15	Cameron Pearson (W)	6 ft 0 in (1.83 m)	175 lb (79 kg)	RS So	Chatfield	Lakewood, CO
F	20	Spencer Johnson	6 ft 5 in (1.96 m)	175 lb (79 kg)	RS So	American Fork; Weber State; Utah Valley; Salt Lake CC	American Fork, UT
G	21	Trevin Knell	6 ft 5 in (1.96 m)	190 lb (86 kg)	So	Woods Cross	Woods Cross, UT
F	24	Townsend Tripple (injured) (W)	6 ft 8 in (2.03 m)	200 lb (91 kg)	Fr	Rocky Mountain	Meridian, ID
F	25	Gavin Baxter (injured)	6 ft 9 in (2.06 m)	210 lb (95 kg)	Jr	Timpview	Provo, UT
F	33	Caleb Lohner	6 ft 7 in (2.01 m)	200 lb (91 kg)	Fr	Wasatch Academy	Flower Mound, TX
F	40	Kolby Lee	6 ft 9 in (2.06 m)	260 lb (118 kg)	RS Jr	Rocky Mountain	Meridian, ID
C	42	Richard Harward	6 ft 11 in (2.11 m)	255 lb (116 kg)	RS Jr	Orem; Utah Valley	Orem, UT
G	44	Connor Harding	6 ft 6 in (1.98 m)	185 lb (84 kg)	Jr	Highland (ID)	Pocatello, ID

Head coach

- Mark Pope (Kentucky)

Assistant coach(es)

- Chris Burgess (Utah)
- Cody Fueger (Utah)
- Nick Robinson (Stanford)

Legend

- (C) Team captain
- (S) Suspended
- (I) Ineligible
- (W) Walk-on
- Injured
- Current redshirt

Roster

== Media coverage ==
=== Radio ===
Greg Wrubell and Mark Durrant return to call men's basketball for the 2020–21 season. Jason Shepherd will fill-in for Greg Wrubell whenever football conflicts arise (Dec 5 & 15), and Greg will call a few games solo due to COVID-19 restrictions.

Affiliates:

- BYU Radio- Flagship Station Nationwide (Dish Network 980, Sirius XM 143, KBYU 89.1 FM HD 2, TuneIn radio, and byuradio.org)
- KSL 102.7 FM and 1160 AM- (Salt Lake City / Provo, Utah and ksl.com)
- KSNA 100.7 FM - Blackfoot / Idaho Falls / Pocatello / Rexburg, Idaho (games)
- KSPZ 105.1 FM and 980 AM- Blackfoot / Idaho Falls / Pocatello / Rexburg, Idaho (coaches' shows)
- KMXD 100.5 FM- Monroe / Manti, Utah
- KSVC 980 AM- Richfield / Manti, Utah
- KDXU 94.9 FM and 890 AM- St. George, Utah

=== Television ===
In September 2019, the West Coast Conference (WCC) agreed to a multi-year deal through the 2026-27 season with ESPN and the CBS Sports Network to broadcast numerous basketball games each year. Previously, the WCC had an agreement with ESPN, but the new agreement adds additional television coverage of basketball games through the CBS Sports Network. Games broadcast on the CBS Sports Network are carried on channel 158 on the Dish Network, channel 221 on DirecTV and channel 269 on Xfinity. Under the terms of the deal, ESPN will broadcast 17 games during the regular season and the CBS Sports Network will broadcast a minimum of 9 games. ESPN will continue to broadcast the quarterfinals, semifinals and the championship game of the WCC tournament. BYU maintains the rights to broadcast home games on BYUtv (11.1 in Salt Lake City, Utah, channel 374 on the Dish Network, and channel 4369/9403 on DirecTV). Meanwhile Stadium broadcasts will be simulcast on KJZZ or KMYU because Utah doesn't have a Stadium tv affiliate.

== Schedule and results ==
BYU's games against Pepperdine, San Diego, and Pacific on December 31, 2020 and January 2 and 7, 2021 were postponed due to COVID-19 cases within those programs. On January 5, 2021, it was announced that BYU's road game against #1 Gonzaga had been moved from February 6 to January 7 to take the place of the postponed Pacific game. On January 8, it was announced that the Pepperdine game originally scheduled for December 31, 2020 had been moved to January 27, 2021. On January 26, it was announced that BYU's home game against San Francisco originally scheduled for January 30 had been postponed due to COVID-19 cases within San Francisco's program.

Date time, TV	Rank^{#}	Opponent^{#}	Result	Record	Site (attendance) city, state
Non-conference regular season
November 25, 2020*; 6:00 pm, BYUtv		Westminster	W 108–59	1–0	Marriott Center (0); Provo, UT
November 26, 2020*; 7:00 pm, BYUtv		New Orleans	W 86–61	2–0	Marriott Center (0); Provo, UT
November 28, 2020*; 7:00 pm, BYUtv		Utah Valley; UCCU Crosstown Clash	W 82–60	3–0	Marriott Center (0); Provo, UT
December 1, 2020*; 12:30 pm, ESPN2		vs. USC; Legends Classic	L 53–79	3–1	Mohegan Sun Arena (0); Uncasville, CT
December 2, 2020*; 3:00 pm, ESPN2		vs. St. John's; Legends Classic	W 74–68	4–1	Mohegan Sun Arena (0); Uncasville, CT
December 5, 2020*; 7:00 pm, MW Net		at Utah State; Rivalry	W 67–64	5–1	Smith Spectrum (1,628); Logan, UT
December 9, 2020*; 7:00 pm, BYUtv		Boise State	L 70–74	5–2	Marriott Center (0); Provo, UT
December 12, 2020*; 4:00 pm, BYUtv		Utah; Deseret First Duel	W 82–64	6–2	Marriott Center (0); Provo, UT
December 18, 2020*; 3:00 pm, CBSSN		at No. 18 San Diego State; Rivalry	W 72–62	7–2	Viejas Arena (0); San Diego, CA
December 21, 2020*; 7:00 pm, BYUtv		Texas Southern	W 87–71	8–2	Marriott Center (0); Provo, UT
December 23, 2020*; 5:00 pm, BYUtv		vs. Weber State	W 87–79	9–2	Vivint Smart Home Arena (1,500); Salt Lake City, UT
WCC Regular Season
December 31, 2020; 4:00 pm, ESPN2		at Pepperdine	Postponed due to COVID-19 issues		Firestone Fieldhouse; Malibu, CA
January 2, 2021; 2:00 pm, Stadium		at San Diego	Postponed due to COVID-19 issues		Jenny Craig Pavilion; San Diego, CA
January 7, 2021; 2:00 pm, BYUtv		Pacific	Postponed due to COVID-19 issues		Marriott Center; Provo, UT
January 7, 2021; 6:30 pm, ESPN		at No. 1 Gonzaga; Rivalry/moved from February 6	L 69–86	9–3 (0–1)	McCarthey Athletic Center (0); Spokane, WA
January 14, 2021; 9:00 pm, ESPN2		at Saint Mary's	W 62–52	10–3 (1–1)	University Credit Union Pavilion (0); Moraga, CA
January 16, 2021; 6:00 pm, ESPN		at San Francisco	W 72–63	11–3 (2–1)	The Sobrato Center (0); San Francisco, CA
January 21, 2021; 7:00 pm, CBSSN		Portland	W 95–67	12–3 (3–1)	Marriott Center (0); Provo, UT
January 23, 2021; 8:00 pm, ESPN2		Pepperdine	W 65–54	13–3 (4–1)	Marriott Center (0); Provo, UT
January 27, 2021; 1:00 pm, ATTRM/BYUtv		at Pepperdine rescheduled from December 31	L 73–76	13–4 (4–2)	Firestone Fieldhouse (0); Malibu, CA
January 30, 2021; 8:00 pm, CBSSN		San Francisco	Postponed due to COVID-19 issues		Marriott Center; Provo, UT
January 30, 2021; 4:00 pm, CBSSN		Pacific rescheduled from January 7	W 95–87 ^{2OT}	14–4 (5–2)	Marriott Center (0); Provo, UT
February 2, 2021; 7:00 pm, Stadium		at San Diego rescheduled from January 2	Canceled due to COVID-19 issues		Jenny Craig Pavilion; San Diego, CA
February 4, 2021; 5:00 pm, Stadium		at Portland	W 105–60	15–4 (6–2)	Chiles Center (0); Portland, OR
February 8, 2021; 9:00 pm, ESPN		No. 1 Gonzaga; Rivalry/Moved from February 27	L 71–82	15–5 (6–3)	Marriott Center (0); Provo, UT
February 11, 2021; 8:00 pm, ESPN2		Saint Mary's	Postponed due to COVID-19 issues		Marriott Center; Provo, UT
February 13, 2021; 6:00 pm, BYUtv		San Diego	Canceled due to COVID-19 issues		Marriott Center; Provo, UT
February 18, 2021; 6:00 pm, CBSSN		at Pacific	W 80–52	16–5 (7–3)	Alex G. Spanos Center (0); Stockton, CA
February 20, 2021; 1:00 pm, CBSSN		at Loyola Marymount	W 88–71	17–5 (8–3)	Gersten Pavilion (0); Los Angeles, CA
February 25, 2021; CBSSN		at Santa Clara	Canceled due to scheduling changes		Marriott Center; Provo, UT
February 25, 2021; 7:00 pm, CBSSN		San Francisco rescheduled from January 30	W 79–73	18–5 (9–3)	Marriott Center (1,750); Provo, UT
February 27, 2021; 8:00 pm, ESPNU		Saint Mary's rescheduled from February 11	W 65–51	19–5 (10–3)	Marriott Center (1,750); Provo, UT
WCC Tournament
March 8, 2021; 8:00 pm, ESPN2	(2)	vs. (3) Pepperdine; Semifinals	W 82–77 ^{OT}	20–5	Orleans Arena (0); Paradise, NV
March 9, 2021; 6:00 pm, ESPN	(2)	vs. (1) No. 1 Gonzaga; Championship/Rivalry	L 78–88	20–6	Orleans Arena (0); Paradise, NV
NCAA tournament
March 20, 2021; 7:40 pm, CBS	(6 E) No. 23	vs. (11 E) UCLA; First Round	L 62–73	20–7	Hinkle Fieldhouse (1,250); Indianapolis, IN
*Non-conference game. ^{#}Rankings from AP Poll. (#) Tournament seedings in parentheses. All times are in Mountain.

== Game summaries ==
Series Histories are adjusted for the second consecutive season. On the series history the 47 wins the NCAA had BYU forfeit during the 2015–16 and 2016–17 seasons aren't indicated. The forfeits are not added to the loss column. They are merely struck from the win column. All rankings are from the AP poll unless specifically indicated otherwise.

=== Westminster ===
Series History: First Meeting

Broadcasters: Dave McCann, Blaine Fowler, & Spencer Linton
Starting Lineups:

- Westminster: Taylor Miller, Isaiah Banks, Reme Torbert, Brandon Willardson, Joey Andrews
- BYU: Brandon Averette, Alex Barcello, Gavin Baxter, Kolby Lee, Connor Harding

BYUtv

Nov 25
6:05 p.m. MST

Recap

Westminster Griffins	59–108	BYU Cougars
Scoring by half: 31–54, 28–54
Pts: Reme Torbert 16; Rebs: Isaiah Banks 6 Asts: Isaiah Banks 3		Pts: Alex Barcello 25; Rebs: Richard Harward 7 Asts: Kolby Lee 7

Marriott Center
Provo, UT
Attendance: 0
Referees: Casey McClellan, Mark Scott, Scott DeBo

=== New Orleans ===
Series History: New Orleans leads 1–0

Broadcasters: Dave McCann, Blaine Fowler & Spencer Linton
Starting Lineups:

- New Orleans: Damion Rosser, Lamont Berzat, Troy Green, Jahmel Myers, Ahren Freeman
- BYU: Brandon Averette, Alex Barcello, Gavin Baxter, Kolby Lee, Connor Harding

BYUtv

Nov 26
7:05 p.m. MST

Recap

New Orleans Privateers	61–86	BYU Cougars
Scoring by half: 27–41, 34–45
Pts: Damion Rosser, Lamont Berzat 15; Rebs: Damion Rosser 9 Asts: Derek St. Hilaire 3		Pts: Alex Barcello 19; Rebs: Richard Harward 10; Asts: Alex Barcello 4

Marriott Center
Provo, UT
Attendance: 0
Referees: Shawn Lehigh, Jimmy Casas, Chad Shepherd

=== UCCU Crosstown Clash: Utah Valley ===
Series History: BYU leads 3–1

Broadcasters: Dave McCann, Blaine Fowler, & Spencer Linton
Starting Lineups:

- Utah Valley: Fardaws Aimaq, Le'Tre Darthard, Jamison Overton, Jordan Brinson, Trey Woodbury
- BYU: Brandon Averette, Alex Barcello, Caleb Lohner, Kolby Lee, Connor Harding

BYUtv

Nov 28
7:05 p.m. MST

Recap

Utah Valley Wolverines	60–82	BYU Cougars
Scoring by half: 24–38, 36–44
Pts: Trey Woodbury 24; Rebs: Jamison Overton 8 Asts: Trey Woodbury 3		Pts: Alex Barcello 20; Rebs: Caleb Lohner 8 Asts: Brandon Averette 6

Marriott Center
Provo, UT
Attendance: 0
Referees: Deldre Carr, Eric Curry, Travis Schatzman

=== USC ===
Series History: USC leads 7–3

Broadcasters: Jon Sciambi & Jon Crispin
Starting Lineups:

- BYU: Matt Haarms, Brandon Averette, Alex Barcello, Kolby Lee, Connor Harding
- USC: Tahj Eaddy, Isaiah Mobley, Evan Mobley, Drew Peterson, Ethan Anderson

ESPN2

Dec 1
2:30 p.m. EST

Recap

BYU Cougars	53–79	USC Trojans
Scoring by half: 20–31, 33–48
Pts: Matt Haarms, Gideon George 11; Rebs: Matt Haarms, Gideon George 6 Asts: Alex Barcello 4		Pts: Drew Peterson 19; Rebs: Isaiah Mobley, Evan Mobley 11; Asts: Tahj Eaddy 4

Mohegan Sun Arena
Uncasville, CT
Attendance: 0
Referees: DJ Carstenson, Terry Wyner, Ron Tyberski

=== St. John's ===
Series History: St. John's leads 7–1

Broadcasters: Jon Sciambi & Jon Crispin
Starting Lineups:

- BYU: Matt Haarms, Brandon Averette, Alex Barcello, Caleb Lohner, Connor Harding
- St. John's: Posh Alexander, Julian Champagne, Greg Williams Jr., Isaih Moore, Vince Cole

ESPN2

Dec 2
5:00 p.m. EST

Recap

BYU Cougars	74–68	St. John's Red Storm
Scoring by half: 29–23, 45–45
Pts: Alex Barcello 20; Rebs: Gideon George 15; Asts: Alex Barcello 5		Pts: Julian Champagne 25; Rebs: Posh Alexander 6 Asts: Posh Alexander 7

Mohegan Sun Arena
Uncasville, CT
Attendance: 0
Referees: Terry Wyner, DJ Carstenson, Donnie Eppley

=== Utah State ===
Series History: BYU leads 142–92

Broadcasters: Scott Garrard & Lance Beckert
Starting Lineups:

- BYU: Matt Haarms, Brandon Averette, Alex Barcello, Caleb Lohner, Connor Harding
- Utah State: Brock Miller, Neemias Queta, Rollie Worster, Justin Bean, Marco Anthony

MW Net

Dec 5
7:00 p.m. MST

Recap

BYU Cougars	67–64	Utah State Aggies
Scoring by half: 39–29, 28–35
Pts: Alex Barcello 23; Rebs: Caleb Lohner 6 Asts: Matt Haarms, Brandon Averette, Alex Barcello, Connor Harding, Spencer Johnson, Richard Harward 2		Pts: Neemias Queta 18; Rebs: Justin Bean 13; Asts: Rollie Worster 5

Dee Glen Smith Spectrum
Logan, UT
Attendance: 1,628
Referees: Mike Reed, Gerry Pollard, Gregory Nixon

=== Boise State ===
Series History: BYU leads 9–5

Broadcasters: Dave McCann, Blaine Fowler, & Spencer Linton
Starting Lineups:

- Boise State: Mladen Armus, Abu Kigab, Rayj Dennis, Emmanuel Akot, Derrick Alston Jr.
- BYU: Matt Haarms, Brandon Averette, Alex Barcello, Caleb Lohner, Connor Harding

BYUtv

Dec 5
7:07 p.m. MST

Recap

Boise State Broncos	74–70	BYU Cougars
Scoring by half: 30–21, 44–49
Pts: Rayj Dennis 19; Rebs: Emmanuel Akot 6 Asts: Rayj Dennis 5		Pts: Alex Barcello 22; Rebs: Caleb Lohner, Brandon Averette 6 Asts: Brandon Averette 4

Marriott Center
Provo, UT
Attendance: 0
Referees: Kevin Brill, Verne Harris, Deldre Carr

=== Deseret First Duel: Utah ===
Series History: BYU leads 131–129

Broadcasters: Dave McCann, Blaine Fowler, & Spencer Linton
Starting Lineups:

- Utah: Mikael Jantunen, Timmy Allen, Branden Carlson, Alfonso Plummer, Rylan Jones
- BYU: Matt Haarms, Brandon Averette, Alex Barcello, Kolby Lee, Connor Harding

BYUtv

Dec 12
4:07 p.m. MST

Recap

Utah Utes	64–82	BYU Cougars
Scoring by half: 27–40, 37–42
Pts: Alfonso Plummer 19; Rebs: Branden Carlson 8 Asts: Timmy Allen 5		Pts: Connor Harding 17; Rebs: Caleb Lohner 10; Asts: Alex Barcello 8

Marriott Center
Provo, UT
Attendance: 0
Referees: Randy McCall, David Hall, Eric Curry

=== San Diego State ===
Series History: BYU leads 48–26

Broadcasters: John Sadak & Steve Lappas
Starting Lineups:

- BYU: Matt Haarms, Brandon Averette, Alex Barcello, Kolby Lee, Connor Harding
- San Diego State: Nathan Mensa, Aguek Arop, Matt Mitchell, Trey Pulliam, Jordan Schakel

CBSSN

Dec 18
2:00 p.m. PST

Recap

BYU Cougars	72–62	#18 San Diego State Aztecs
Scoring by half: 35–20, 37–42
Pts: Alex Barcello 22; Rebs: Matt Haarms 8 Asts: Alex Barcello 75		Pts: Matt Mitchell 35; Rebs: Aguek Arop, Trey Pulliam 4 Asts: Trey Pulliam 5

Viejas Arena
San Diego, CA
Attendance: 0
Referees: Larry Spaulding, Chris Rastatter, Kipp Kissinger

=== Texas Southern ===
Series History: BYU leads 2–0

Broadcasters: Dave McCann & Blaine Fowler
Starting Lineups:

- Texas Southern: Jordan Nicholas, John Walker III, Galen Alexander, John Jones, Michael Weathers
- BYU: Matt Haarms, Brandon Averette, Alex Barcello, Kolby Lee, Connor Harding

BYUtv

Dec 21
7:07 p.m. MST

Recap

Texas Southern Tigers	71–87	BYU Cougars
Scoring by half: 32–42, 39–45
Pts: Michael Weathers 23; Rebs: Yahuza Rasas 12; Asts: Michael Weathers 5		Pts: Brandon Averette 30; Rebs: Caleb Lohner 6 Asts: Alex Barcello 10

Marriott Center
Provo, UT
Attendance: 0
Referees: Deldre Carr, Tommy Nunez, Scott Brown

=== Weber State ===
Series History: BYU leads 33–11

Broadcasters: Dave McCann, Blaine Fowler, & Spencer Linton
Starting Lineups:

- Weber State: Cody Carlson, Dontay Bassett, Seikou Sisoho Jawara, Zahir Porter, Isiah Brown
- BYU: Matt Haarms, Brandon Averette, Alex Barcello, Kolby Lee, Connor Harding

BYUtv

Dec 23
5:00 p.m. MST

Recap

Weber State Wildcats	79–87	BYU Cougars
Scoring by half: 32–41, 37–36
Pts: Seikou Sisoho Jawara, Zahir Porter 16; Rebs: Isiah Brown 6 Asts: Seikou Sisoho Jawara 5		Pts: Matt Haarms 15; Rebs: Caleb Lohner 8 Asts: Brandon Averette 7

Vivint Smart Home Arena
Salt Lake City, UT
Attendance: 1,500
Referees: Shawn Lehigh, Verne Harris, Nate Harris

=== Gonzaga ===
Series History: Gonzaga leads 18–5

Broadcasters: Dave Flemming & Sean Farnham
Starting Lineups:

- BYU: Matt Haarms, Brandon Averette, Alex Barcello, Kolby Lee, Connor Harding
- Gonzaga: Anton Watson, Drew Timme, Corey Kispert, Jalen Suggs, Joël Ayayi

ESPN

Jan 7
5:30 p.m. PST

Recap

BYU Cougars	69–86	#1/1 Gonzaga Bulldogs
Scoring by half: 29–52, 40–34
Pts: Matt Haarms, Caleb Lohner 13; Rebs: Spencer Johnson 7 Asts: Alex Barcello 5		Pts: Drew Timme 23; Rebs: Anton Watson 8 Asts: Joël Ayayi 6

McCarthey Athletic Center
Spokane, WA
Attendance: 0
Referees: Verne Harris, Bob Staffen, Tommy Nunez

=== Saint Mary's ===
Series History: Saint Mary's leads 16–14

Broadcasters: Dave Feldman & Corey Williams
Starting Lineups:

- BYU: Matt Haarms, Brandon Averette, Alex Barcello, Trevin Knell, Kolby Lee
- Saint Mary's: Matthias Tass, Dan Fotu, Jabe Mullins, Logan Johnson, Tommy Kuhse

ESPN2

Jan 14
8:00 p.m. PST

Recap

BYU Cougars	62–52	Saint Mary's Gaels
Scoring by half: 25–29, 37–23
Pts: Alex Barcello 14; Rebs: Caleb Lohner 9 Asts: Brandon Averette 3		Pts: Tommy Kuhse, Quinn Clinton 12; Rebs: Dan Fotu, Kyle Bowen 5 Asts: Tommy Kuhse 4

University Credit Union Pavilion
Moraga, CA
Attendance: 0
Referees: Randy McCall, Larry Spaulding, Deldre Carr

=== San Francisco ===
Series History: BYU leads 19–9

Broadcasters: Eric Rothman & Richie Schueler
Starting Lineups:

- BYU: Matt Haarms, Brandon Averette, Alex Barcello, Trevin Knell, Kolby Lee
- San Francisco: Josh Kunen, Dzmitry Ryuny, Taavi Jurkatamm, Khalil Shabazz, Jamaree Bouyea

ESPN

Jan 16
5:00 p.m. PST

Recap

BYU Cougars	72–63	San Francisco Dons
Scoring by half: 26–27, 46–36
Pts: Alex Barcello 19; Rebs: Richard Harward 11; Asts: Matt Haarms 3		Pts: Khalil Shabazz 30; Rebs: Taavi Jurkatamm 6 Asts: Taavi Jurkatamm 3

The Sobrato Center
San Francisco, CA
Attendance: 0
Referees: Eric Curry, Marc Beasley, Rick O'Neill

=== Portland ===
Series History: BYU leads 19–2

Broadcasters: Carter Blackburn & Avery Johnson
Starting Lineups:

- Portland: Zac Triplett, Ahmed Ali, Latrell Jones, Eddie Davis, Michael Henn
- BYU: Matt Haarms, Brandon Averette, Alex Barcello, Trevin Knell, Kolby Lee

CBSSN

Jan 21
7:05 p.m. MST

Recap

Portland Pilots	67–95	BYU Cougars
Scoring by half: 31–37, 36–58
Pts: Latrell Jones 21; Rebs: Hayden Curtiss, Michael Henn 4 Asts: Eddie Davis 6		Pts: Matt Haarms 23; Rebs: Alex Barcello 8 Asts: Alex Barcello, Caleb Lohner 6

Marriott Center
Provo, UT
Attendance: 0
Referees: Winston Smith, Daryl Gelinas, Ron Brokenbrough

=== Pepperdine ===
Series History: BYU leads 14–9

Broadcasters: Dave Flemming & Sean Farnham
Starting Lineups:

- Pepperdine: Sedrick Altman, Colbey Ross, Kessler Edwards, Kene Chukwuka, Victor Ohia Obioha
- BYU: Matt Haarms, Brandon Averette, Alex Barcello, Trevin Knell, Kolby Lee

ESPN2

Jan 23
8:10 p.m. MST

Recap

Pepperdine Waves	54–65	BYU Cougars
Scoring by half: 26–37, 28–28
Pts: Colbey Ross 27; Rebs: Kessler Edwards, Kene Chukwuka 10; Asts: Colbey Ross 4		Pts: Brandon Averette 15; Rebs: Connor Harding 10; Asts: Alex Barcello 6

Marriott Center
Provo, UT
Attendance: 0
Referees: Verne Harris, Deron White, Doran Gotschall

=== Pepperdine ===
Series History: BYU leads 15–9

Broadcasters: J.B. Long & Wyking Jones
Starting Lineups:

- BYU: Matt Haarms, Brandon Averette, Alex Barcello, Trevin Knell, Kolby Lee
- Pepperdine: Sedrick Altman, Colbey Ross, Kessler Edwards, Kene Chukwuka, Victor Ohia Obioha

ATTRM
BYUtv

Jan 27
12:00 p.m. PST

Recap

BYU Cougars	73–76	Pepperdine Waves
Scoring by half: 37–32, 36–44
Pts: Spencer Johnson 15; Rebs: Caleb Lohner 6 Asts: Alex Barcello 3		Pts: Colbey Ross 19; Rebs: Sedrick Altman 9 Asts: Colbey Ross 6

Firestone Fieldhouse
Malibu, CA
Attendance: 0
Referees: Tony Padilla, Randy McCall, Mike Reed

=== Pacific ===
Series History: BYU leads 10–6

Broadcasters: Jason Horowitz & Chris Walker
Starting Lineups:

- Pacific: Jordan Bell, Pierre Crockrell II, Daniss Jenkins, Jeremiah Bailey, Broc Finstuen
- BYU: Matt Haarms, Brandon Averette, Alex Barcello, Trevin Knell, Kolby Lee

CBSSN

Jan 30
4:05 p.m. MST

Recap

Pacific Tigers	87–95 (OT)	BYU Cougars
Scoring by half: 32–31, 32–33 Overtime: 11–11, 12–20
Pts: Justin Moore 18; Rebs: Jordan Bell 10; Asts: Justin Moore 4		Pts: Brandon Averette 24; Rebs: Alex Barcello 9 Asts: Alex Barcello 7

Marriott Center
Provo, UT
Attendance: 0
Referees: David Hall, Brent Meaux, Mike O'Neill

=== Portland ===
Series History: BYU leads 20–2

Broadcasters: Ann Schatz & Francis Williams
Starting Lineups:

- BYU: Matt Haarms, Brandon Averette, Gideon George, Alex Barcello, Caleb Lohner
- Portland: Ahmed Ali, Latrell Jones, Eddie Davis, Hayden Curtiss, Michael Henn

Stadium
KJZZ

Feb 4
4:00 p.m. PST

Recap

BYU Cougars	105–60	Portland Pilots
Scoring by half: 52–30, 53–30
Pts: Gideon George 19; Rebs: Gideon George 13; Asts: Brandon Averette 5		Pts: Eddie Davis 17; Rebs: Ahmed Ali, Quincy Ferebee, Hayden Curtiss 2 Asts: Hayden Curtiss 4

Chiles Center
Portland, OR
Attendance: 0
Referees: Michael Irving, Deron White, Daryl Gelinas

=== Gonzaga ===
Series History: Gonzaga leads 19–5

Broadcasters: Dave Flemming & Sean Farnham
Starting Lineups:

- Gonzaga: Jalen Suggs, Drew Timme, Andrew Nembhard, Joël Ayayi, Corey Kispert
- BYU: Matt Haarms, Brandon Averette, Gideon George, Alex Barcello, Caleb Lohner

ESPN

Feb 8
9:05 p.m. MST

Recap

#1 Gonzaga Bulldogs	82–71	BYU Cougars
Scoring by half: 41–31, 41–40
Pts: Jalen Suggs 24; Rebs: Drew Timme 13; Asts: Joël Ayayi 4		Pts: Alex Barcello 20; Rebs: Caleb Lohner 8 Asts: Brandon Averette 6

Marriott Center
Provo, UT
Attendance: 0
Referees: Verne Harris, Michael Greenstein, Larry Spaulding

=== Pacific ===
Series History: BYU leads 11–6

Broadcasters: Rich Waltz & Dan Dickau
Starting Lineups:

- BYU: Matt Haarms, Brandon Averette, Gideon George, Alex Barcello, Caleb Lohner
- Pacific: Jordan Bell, Pierre Crockrell II, Daniss Jenkins, Jeremiah Bailey, Broc Finstuen

CBSSN

Feb 18
5:00 p.m. PST

Recap

BYU Cougars	80–52	Pacific Tigers
Scoring by half: 38–26, 42–26
Pts: Caleb Lohner 19; Rebs: Caleb Lohner 9 Asts: Brandon Averette 7		Pts: Broc Finstuen 12; Rebs: Jordan Bell 7 Asts: Pierre Crockrell III, Daniss Jenkins 4

Alex G. Spanos Center
Stockton, CA
Attendance: 0
Referees: Ryan Holmes, Chris Rastatter, Winston Stith

=== Loyola Marymount ===
Series History: BYU leads 13–5

Broadcasters: Jason Horowitz, Chris Walker, & Steve Donahue
Starting Lineups:

- BYU: Matt Haarms, Brandon Averette, Gideon George, Alex Barcello, Caleb Lohner
- Loyola Marymount: Eli Scott, Jalin Anderson, Mattias Markusson, Keli Leaupepe, Ivan Alipiev

CBSSN

Feb 20
1:00 p.m. PST

Recap

BYU Cougars	88–71	Loyola Marymount Lions
Scoring by half: 47–25, 41–46
Pts: Matt Haarms 21; Rebs: Caleb Lohner 7 Asts: Brandon Averette 5		Pts: Ivan Alipiev 22; Rebs: Keli Leaupepe, Parker Dortch 6 Asts: Jalin Anderson 4

Gersten Pavilion
Los Angeles, CA
Attendance: 0
Referees: Wilson Holland, Ron Brokenbrough, Brady Chelette

=== San Francisco ===
Series History: BYU leads 20–9

Broadcasters: John Sadak & Chris Walker
Starting Lineups:

- San Francisco: Khalil Shabazz, Jamaree Bouyea, Josh Kunen, Dzmitry Ryuny, Jonas Visser
- BYU: Matt Haarms, Brandon Averette, Gideon George, Alex Barcello, Caleb Lohner

CBSSN

Feb 25
7:05 p.m. MST

Recap

San Francisco Dons	73–79	BYU Cougars
Scoring by half: 33-41, 40-38
Pts: Julian Rishwain 25; Rebs: Julian Rishwain 5 Asts: Jamaree Bouyea 4		Pts: Alex Barcello 29; Rebs: Caleb Lohner 9 Asts: Brandon Averette, Alex Barcello 5 Barcello made 7/7 3-point attempts (BYU record)

Marriott Center
Provo, UT
Attendance: 1,750
Referees: Brad Ferrie, Rick O'Neill, Kerby Sitton

=== Saint Mary's ===
Series History: Saint Mary's leads 16–15

Broadcasters: Roxy Bernstein & Adrian Branch
Starting Lineups:

- Saint Mary's: Logan Johnson, Matthias Tass, Tommy Kuhse, Judah Brown, Dan Fotu
- BYU: Matt Haarms, Brandon Averette, Gideon George, Alex Barcello, Caleb Lohner

ESPNU

Feb 27
8:05 p.m. MST

Recap

Saint Mary's Gaels	51–65	BYU Cougars
Scoring by half: 18–23, 33–42
Pts: Logan Johnson 17; Rebs: Dan Fotu 10; Asts: Tommy Kuhse 3		Pts: Trevin Knell 15; Rebs: Matt Haarms 10; Asts: Alex Barcello 5

Marriott Center
Provo, UT
Attendance: 1,750
Referees: Mark Beasley, Brady Chelette, Rick O'Neill

=== WCC Semifinal: Pepperdine ===
Series History: BYU leads 15–10

Broadcasters: Dave Flemming & Sean Farnham
Starting Lineups:

- Pepperdine: Sedrick Altman, Colbey Ross, Jade' Smith, Kessler Edwards, Jan Zidek
- BYU: Matt Haarms, Brandon Averette, Gideon George, Alex Barcello, Caleb Lohner

ESPN2

Mar 8
9:01 p.m. PST

Recap

Pepperdine Waves	77–82 (OT)	BYU Cougars
Scoring by half: 35–35, 37–37 Overtime: 5–10
Pts: Kessler Edwards 20; Rebs: Kessler Edwards 9 Asts: Kessler Edwards 5		Pts: Alex Barcello 23; Rebs: Alex Barcello, Caleb Lohner 9 Asts: Brandon Averette 5

Orleans Arena
Paradise, NV
Attendance: 0
Referees: Randy McCall, Tony Padilla, Mike Greenstein

=== WCC Championship: Gonzaga ===
Series History: Gonzaga leads 20–5

Broadcasters: Dave Flemming & Sean Farnham (ESPN)
Ryan Radtke & Dan Dickau (Westwood One)
Starting Lineups:

- BYU: Matt Haarms, Brandon Averette, Gideon George, Alex Barcello, Caleb Lohner
- Gonzaga: Jalen Suggs, Drew Timme, Andrew Nembhard, Joël Ayayi, Corey Kispert

ESPN

Mar 9
6:05 p.m. MST

Recap

BYU Cougars	78–88	#1 Gonzaga Bulldogs
Scoring by half: 53–41, 25–47
Pts: Trevin Knell 20; Rebs: Caleb Lohner 10; Asts: Brandon Averette, Caleb Lohner 4		Pts: Jalen Suggs 23; Rebs: Joël Ayayi 9 Asts: Jalen Suggs 5

Orleans Arena
Paradise, NV
Attendance: 0
Referees: Randy McCall, Verne Harris, David Hall

=== NCAA 1st Round: UCLA ===
Series History: Series Even 12–12

Broadcasters: Andrew Catalon, Steve Lappas & AJ Ross (CBS)
Brandon Gaudin & Dan Dickau (Westwood One)
Starting Lineups:

- UCLA: Jules Bernard, Cody Riley, Johnny Juzang, Jaime Jaquez Jr., Tyger Campbell
- BYU: Matt Haarms, Brandon Averette, Gideon George, Alex Barcello, Caleb Lohner

CBS

Mar 20
9:41 p.m. EST

Recap

UCLA Bruins	73–62	#23 BYU Cougars
Scoring by half: 38–27, 35–35
Pts: Johnny Juzang 27; Rebs: Jamie Jaquez Jr. 9 Asts: Tyger Campbell 5		Pts: Alex Barcello 20; Rebs: Matt Haarms, Caleb Lohner 10; Asts: Brandon Averette 2

Hinkle Fieldhouse
Indianapolis, IN
Attendance: 1,250
Referees: Randy McCall, Pat Adams, Rob Riley

== Rankings ==
Ranking movements Legend: ██ Increase in ranking ██ Decrease in ranking — = Not ranked RV = Received votes
	Week																		
Poll	Pre	1	2	3	4	5	6	7	8	9	10	11	12	13	14	15	16	17	Final
AP	RV	RV	—	—	—	RV	RV	RV	—	—	RV	—	RV	RV	RV	RV	RV	23	Not released
Coaches	RV	RV^	—	—	—	RV	—	—	—	—	—	—	—	—	RV	RV	RV	RV	RV

^The Coaches poll did not release a week 1 ranking.

== Future opponents ==
For the upcoming 2021–22 season, BYU is scheduled to play the following non-conference opponents:

- Arizona State - December 18, 2021 (neutral site @ Talking Stick Arena as part of the Jerry Colangelo Classic)
- Iona (site TBD)
- San Diego State (home)
- Utah (away)
- Utah Valley (away)
