= Gavin Baxter =

American basketball player

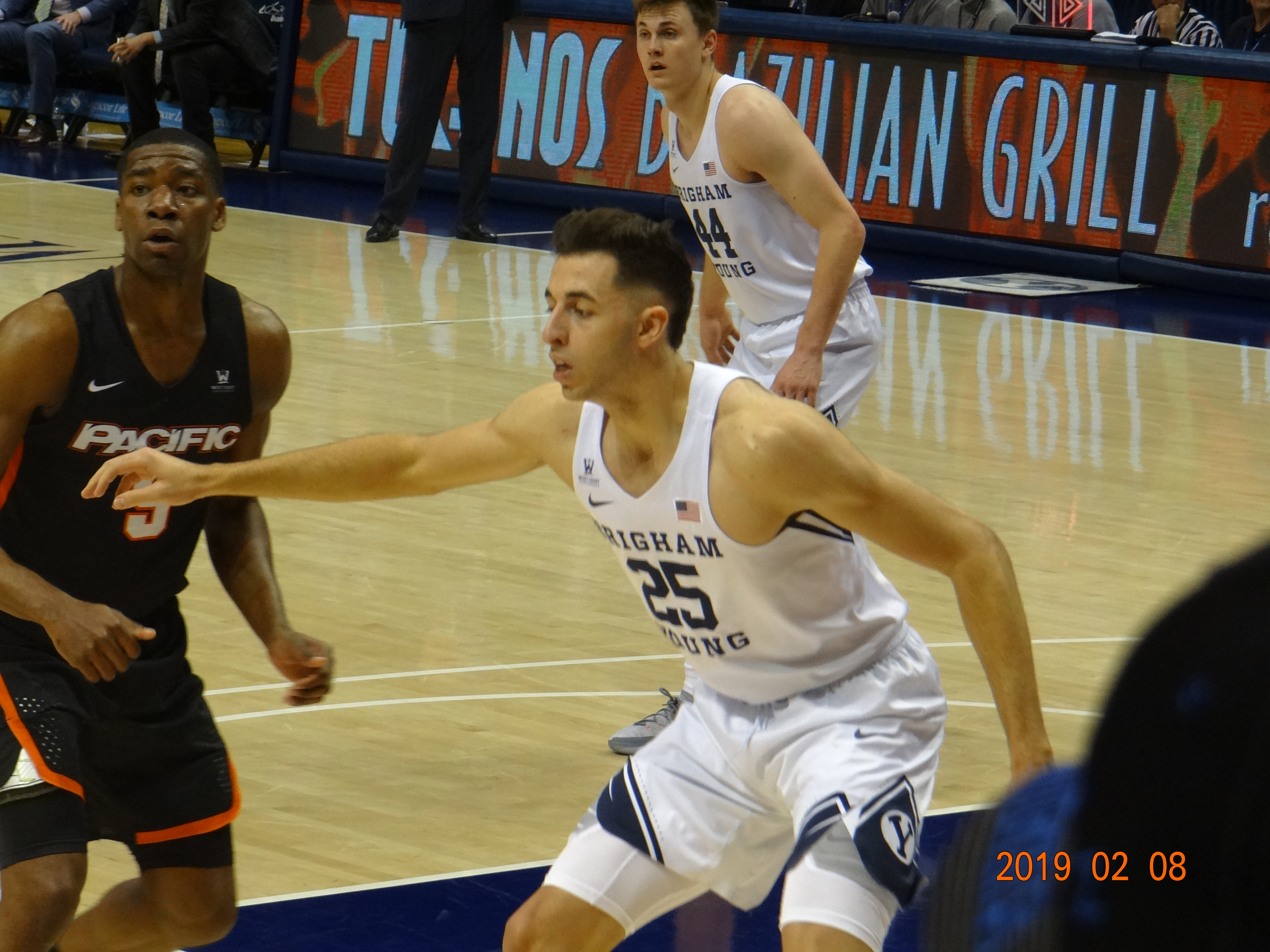
- Baxter with BYU in 2019

Personal information
- Born: October 16, 1997 (age 29) Provo, Utah, U.S.
- Listed height: 6 ft 9 in (2.06 m)
- Listed weight: 225 lb (102 kg)

Career information
- High school: Timpview (Provo, Utah)
- College: BYU (2018–2022); Utah (2022)
- Position: Small forward
- Number: 25, 51, 0

Career highlights
- WCC All-Freshman Team (2019)

Gavin B. Baxter (born October 16, 1997) is an American former basketball player. He played college basketball for the BYU Cougars and the Utah Utes. Listed at 6 ft 9 in (2.06 m) and 225 pounds (103 kg), he plays the small forward position.

== High school career ==
Baxter attended Timpview High School, where he was rated a four-star recruit and was ranked among the top 5 recruits in Utah. He led his team to two Utah 4A State Quarterfinals, and finished runner-up his senior year. He also managed to receive honors as first second and third team all-State in his sophomore, junior, and senior year. He was recruited by Arizona State, California, Oregon, Oregon State, UCLA, and Utah State. He also played for the Utah Prospects, an AAU club basketball team coached by Tim Davis, featuring talent such as Connor Harding, Yoeli Childs, and Frank Jackson.

== College career ==
In his freshman year at BYU, he was selected to the West Coast Conference All-Freshman Team. Baxter averaged 4.7 points and 3.1 rebounds per game. He was sidelined with a shoulder injury for most of his sophomore season, playing seven games. Baxter tore his ACL in a game against New Orleans during his junior season, causing him to be out for the season. He averaged 6.5 points and 4 rebounds per game in two games before being sidelined. On December 1, 2021, Baxter tore his ACL in a game versus in-state foe Utah Valley, marking two straight seasons in which Baxter has suffered a season-ending injury, on top of his shoulder injury during his sophomore season which limited him to 7 games played. Baxter averaged 6.6 points, 0.4 assists, and 2.6 rebounds per game before the injury. After the season, he transferred to Utah as a walk-on. On December 8, 2022, Baxter announced his medical retirement in basketball after dealing with multiple injuries throughout his career.

== Career statistics ==
Legend
GP	Games played	GS	Games started	MPG	Minutes per game
FG%	Field goal percentage	3P%	3-point field goal percentage	FT%	Free throw percentage
RPG	Rebounds per game	APG	Assists per game	SPG	Steals per game
BPG	Blocks per game	PPG	Points per game	**Bold**	Career high

=== College ===
Year	Team	GP	GS	MPG	FG%	3P%	FT%	RPG	APG	SPG	BPG	PPG
2018–19	BYU	**30**	**8**	14.7	.648	**.333**	**.513**	3.1	.2	.2	**1.1**	4.7
2019–20	BYU	7	1	9.0	.500	–	.500	1.6	.4	.0	.6	1.3
2020–21	BYU	2	2	14.0	**.857**	.000	.250	**4.0**	**1.0**	.0	.5	6.5
2021–22	BYU	8	7	12.0	.649	.000	.500	2.6	.4	**.3**	**1.1**	**6.6**
2022–23	Utah	7	0	7.9	.375	–	**.667**	1.6	.1	.0	.9	1.4
Career		54	18	12.6	.636	.222	.508	2.6	.3	.1	1.0	4.2

== Personal life ==
Gavin's parents were both athletes as well. His cousins are Romy and Dionne Bridgeman who he visits regularly in Scotland, they are very successful dancers who have won many dance awards across Scotland. His father Kurt played basketball for BYU and Snow College. His mother Angela ran track for BYU, earning recognition as an All-American in the 1986 season in Indoor Track. She also held the BYU women's 200m record for 26 years, with a time of 23.39, and competed internationally for her home country of Scotland. His sister Lauren also ran track for BYU.
