= 2018–19 BYU Cougars men's basketball team =

American college basketball season

2018–19 BYU Cougars men's basketball
- Conference: West Coast Conference
- Record: 19–13 (11–5 WCC)
- Head coach: Dave Rose (14th season)
- Assistant coaches: Tim LaComb (9th season); Quincy Lewis (4th season); Lee Cummard (1st season)
- Home arena: Marriott Center

2018–19 West Coast Conference men's basketball standings
	Conf.				Overall
Team	W		L	PCT	W		L	PCT
No. 4 Gonzaga	16	–	0	1.000	33	–	4	.892
Saint Mary's †	11	–	5	.688	22	–	12	.647
BYU	11	–	5	.688	19	–	13	.594
San Francisco	9	–	7	.563	21	–	10	.677
Loyola Marymount	8	–	8	.500	22	–	12	.647
Santa Clara	8	–	8	.500	16	–	15	.516
San Diego	7	–	9	.438	21	–	15	.583
Pepperdine	6	–	10	.375	16	–	18	.471
Pacific	4	–	12	.250	14	–	18	.438
Portland	0	–	16	.000	7	–	25	.219
† 2019 WCC tournament winner Rankings from AP Poll

The 2018–19 BYU Cougars men's basketball team represented Brigham Young University in the 2018–19 NCAA Division I men's basketball season. It was head coach Dave Rose's 14th and final season at BYU and the Cougars eighth season as members of the West Coast Conference. The Cougars played their home games at the Marriott Center in Provo, Utah.

== Previous season ==
The Cougars finished the 2017–18 season 24–11, 11–7 in West Coast Conference play to finish in third place. As the No. 3 seed in the WCC tournament, they defeated San Diego in the quarterfinals and Saint Mary's in the semifinals before losing to Gonzaga in the championship game. They received an at-large bid to the National Invitation Tournament where they were defeated by Stanford in the first round.

== Offseason ==
=== Departures ===
Name	Number	Pos.	Height	Weight	Year	Hometown	Reason for departure
Elijah Bryant	3	G	6'3"	210	RS Junior	Gwinnett, GA	Declare for 2018 NBA draft
Kajon Brown	13	G	6'5"	200	Junior	Harvey, LA	Transferred to Southeastern Louisiana
Payton Dastrup	15	C	6'10"	250	Sophomore	Mesa, AZ	Transferred to Oregon State
Braiden Shaw	31	F	6'9"	210	Junior	Eagle, ID	Left the team for personal reasons

=== Incoming transfers ===
Name	Number	Pos.	Height	Weight	Year	Hometown	Previous School
Jesse Wade	10	G	6'1"	175	Sophomore	Kaysville, UT	Transferred from Gonzaga. Under NCAA transfer rules, Wade will sit out the 2018–19 season. Will have three years of remaining eligibility.

=== Recruiting class of 2018 ===
College recruiting information (2018)
Name	Hometown	School	Height	Weight	Commit date
Connor Harding #29 SG	Pocatello, ID	Highland High School	6 ft 5 in (1.96 m)	175 lb (79 kg)	Jul 29, 2015
Connor Harding #29 SG	Recruit ratings: Scout: Rivals: 247Sports: (80)				
Gavin Baxter #24 SF	Provo, UT	Timpview High School	6 ft 7 in (2.01 m)	175 lb (79 kg)	Jun 8, 2015
Gavin Baxter #24 SF	Recruit ratings: Scout: Rivals: 247Sports: (80)				
Overall recruit ranking: Scout: nr Rivals: nr 247Sports: 109 ESPN: nr
Note: In many cases, Scout, Rivals, 247Sports, On3, and ESPN may conflict in their listings of height and weight.; In these cases, the average was taken. ESPN grades are on a 100-point scale.; Sources: "BYU 2018 Basketball Commitments". Rivals.; "2018 BYU Basketball Commits". Scout.; "ESPN". ESPN.; "Scout.com Team Recruiting Rankings". Scout.; "2018 Team Ranking". Rivals.; "2018 BYU Basketball Commits". 247Sports.

=== Recruiting class of 2019 ===
College recruiting information (2019)
Name	Hometown	School	Height	Weight	Commit date
Nate Hansen; PG	Provo, UT	Timpview High School	6 ft 3 in (1.91 m)	165 lb (75 kg)	Aug 2, 2018
Nate Hansen; PG	Recruit ratings: Scout: Rivals: 247Sports: (NR)				
Trevin Knell #55 SG	Woods Cross, UT	Woods Cross High School	6 ft 5 in (1.96 m)	185 lb (84 kg)	
Trevin Knell #55 SG	Recruit ratings: Scout: Rivals: 247Sports: (77)				
Overall recruit ranking: Scout: nr Rivals: nr 247Sports: 109 ESPN: nr
Note: In many cases, Scout, Rivals, 247Sports, On3, and ESPN may conflict in their listings of height and weight.; In these cases, the average was taken. ESPN grades are on a 100-point scale.; Sources: "BYU 2019 Basketball Commitments". Rivals.; "2019 BYU Basketball Commits". Scout.; "ESPN". ESPN.; "Scout.com Team Recruiting Rankings". Scout.; "2019 Team Ranking". Rivals.; "2019 BYU Basketball Commits". 247Sports.

=== Recruiting class of 2020 ===
College recruiting information (2020)
Name	Hometown	School	Height	Weight	Commit date
Hunter Erickson; PG	Provo, UT	Timpview High School	6 ft 3 in (1.91 m)	170 lb (77 kg)	Oct 3, 2017
Hunter Erickson; PG	Recruit ratings: Scout: Rivals: 247Sports: (NR)				
Overall recruit ranking: Scout: nr Rivals: nr 247Sports: 109 ESPN: nr
Note: In many cases, Scout, Rivals, 247Sports, On3, and ESPN may conflict in their listings of height and weight.; In these cases, the average was taken. ESPN grades are on a 100-point scale.; Sources: "BYU 2020 Basketball Commitments". Rivals.; "2020 BYU Basketball Commits". Scout.; "ESPN". ESPN.; "Scout.com Team Recruiting Rankings". Scout.; "2020 Team Ranking". Rivals.; "2020 BYU Basketball Commits". 247Sports.

== Roster ==
2018–19 BYU Cougars men's basketball team
Players
Coaches

Pos.	#	Name	Height	Weight	Year	Previous school	Hometown
G	0	Jahshire Hardnett	6 ft 0 in (1.83 m)	185 lb (84 kg)	Jr	Gulfport; Chipola	Gulfport, MS
G	1	Rylan Bergersen	6 ft 6 in (1.98 m)	200 lb (91 kg)	So	Borah; Link Year	Boise, ID
G	2	Zac Seljaas	6 ft 7 in (2.01 m)	215 lb (98 kg)	Jr	Bountiful	Bountiful, UT
G	4	Nick Emery (C)	6 ft 2 in (1.88 m)	185 lb (84 kg)	Jr	Lone Peak	Alpine, UT
G	10	Jesse Wade (redshirt)	6 ft 1 in (1.85 m)	175 lb (79 kg)	So	Davis; Gonzaga	Kaysville, UT
G	13	Taylor Maughan (W)	6 ft 4 in (1.93 m)	200 lb (91 kg)	Jr	Troy; BYU-Hawaii	Fullerton, CA
G	21	Evan Troy (W)	6 ft 5 in (1.96 m)	180 lb (82 kg)	Jr	Mark Morris	Longview, WA
F	23	Yoeli Childs	6 ft 8 in (2.03 m)	225 lb (102 kg)	Jr	Bingham	South Jordan, UT
G	24	McKay Cannon (W)	6 ft 0 in (1.83 m)	185 lb (84 kg)	RS Sr	Highlands Ranch; Weber State	Highlands Ranch, CO
F	25	Gavin Baxter	6 ft 9 in (2.06 m)	210 lb (95 kg)	Fr	Timpview	Provo, UT
G	30	T. J. Haws	6 ft 4 in (1.93 m)	170 lb (77 kg)	Jr	Lone Peak	Alpine, UT
F	33	Dalton Nixon	6 ft 7 in (2.01 m)	215 lb (98 kg)	RS Jr	Orem	Orem, UT
F	40	Kolby Lee	6 ft 9 in (2.06 m)	260 lb (118 kg)	RS Fr	Rocky Mountain	Meridian, ID
F	41	Luke Worthington (C)	6 ft 10 in (2.08 m)	235 lb (107 kg)	Sr	Homestead	Mequon, WI
G	44	Connor Harding	6 ft 6 in (1.98 m)	185 lb (84 kg)	Fr	Highland	Pocatello, ID

Head coach

- Dave Rose (Houston)

Assistant coach(es)

- Tim LaComb- Assoc. Head Coach (Utah)
- Quincy Lewis (Wagner)
- Lee Cummard (BYU)

Legend

- (C) Team captain
- (S) Suspended
- (I) Ineligible
- (W) Walk-on
- Injured
- Current redshirt

Roster

== Radio ==
Greg Wrubell and Mark Durrant return to call men's basketball for the 2018–19 season, though Jason Shepherd will fill-in for Wrubell on the Cougar Tipoff while Robbie Bullough will fill-in for the Utah Valley game. The radio network is officially called the Nu Skin BYU Sports Network and can be found throughout Utah, Idaho, and Nationwide on SiriusXM and TuneIn. KSFI will take the place of KSL on November 6 as KSL will be providing election coverage.

Affiliates

- BYU Radio- Flagship Station Nationwide (Dish Network 980, Sirius XM 143, TuneIn radio, and byuradio.org)
- KSL 102.7 FM and 1160 AM- (Salt Lake City / Provo, Utah and ksl.com)
- KSNA- Blackfoot / Idaho Falls/ Pocatello / Rexburg, Idaho
- KMXD- Monroe / Manti, Utah
- KSVC- Richfield / Manti, Utah
- KCLS- St. George, Utah

== Schedule and results ==
Date time, TV	Rank^{#}	Opponent^{#}	Result	Record	Site (attendance) city, state
Exhibition
October 24, 2018*; 7:00 pm, BYUtv		Saint Martin's	W 92–71		Marriott Center (10,605); Provo, UT
November 1, 2018*; 7:00 pm, BYUtv		Westminster (UT)	W 72–43		Marriott Center; Provo, UT
Non-conference regular season
November 6, 2018*; 9:00 pm, CBSSN		at No. 7 Nevada	L 70–86	0–1	Lawlor Events Center (11,094); Reno, NV
November 9, 2018*; 8:00 pm, BYUtv		Utah Valley; Old Oquirrh Bucket	W 75–65	1–1	Marriott Center (14,628); Provo, UT
November 13, 2018*; 7:00 pm, BYUtv		Northwestern State; Men Against Breast Cancer Cup	W 82–57	2–1	Marriott Center (10,886); Provo, UT
November 15, 2018*; 7:00 pm, BYUtv		Oral Roberts	W 85–65	3–1	Marriott Center (10,179); Provo, UT
November 17, 2018*; 4:00 pm, BYUtv		Alabama A&M; Men Against Breast Cancer Cup	W 91–60	4–1	Marriott Center (12,206); Provo, UT
November 21, 2018*; 7:00 pm, BYUtv		Rice; Men Against Breast Cancer Cup	W 105–78	5–1	Marriott Center (11,631); Provo, UT
November 24, 2018*; 4:00 pm, BYUtv		Houston; Men Against Breast Cancer Cup	L 62–76	5–2	Marriott Center (10,959); Provo, UT
November 28, 2018*; 6:00 pm, ESPN+		at Illinois State	L 89–92 ^{OT}	5–3	Redbird Arena (6,187); Normal, IL
December 1, 2018*; 7:00 pm, KJZZ		at Weber State; Old Oquirrh Bucket	L 103–113	5–4	Dee Events Center (9,731); Ogden, UT
December 5, 2018*; 7:00 pm, BYUtv		Utah State; Old Oquirrh Bucket	W 95–80	6–4	Marriott Center (11,377); Provo, UT
December 8, 2018*; 12:00 pm, ESPNU		vs. Utah; Deseret First Duel/Beehive Classic	W 74–59	7–4	Vivint Smart Home Arena (10,678); Salt Lake City, UT
December 12, 2018*; 7:00 pm, BYUtv		Portland State	W 85–66	8–4	Marriott Center (11,563); Provo, UT
December 15, 2018*; 6:30 pm, ESPN3		vs. UNLV; MGM Resorts Showcase	L 90–92 ^{OT}	8–5	T-Mobile Arena (5,107); Paradise, NV
December 22, 2018*; 5:00 pm, CBSSN		at San Diego State	L 81–90	8–6	Viejas Arena (11,321); San Diego, CA
December 29, 2018*; 10:00 am, ESPNU		at No. 19 Mississippi State	L 81–103	8–7	Humphrey Coliseum (10,202); Starkville, MS
WCC regular season
January 3, 2019; 9:00 pm, ESPNU		at Pacific	W 90–87	9–7 (1–0)	Alex G. Spanos Center (2,490); Stockton, CA
January 5, 2019; 9:00 pm, ESPN2		at Saint Mary's	L 66–88	9–8 (1–1)	McKeon Pavilion (3,500); Moraga, CA
January 10, 2019; 7:00 pm, BYUtv		Portland	W 79–56	10–8 (2–1)	Marriott Center (10,733); Provo, UT
January 12, 2019; 7:00 pm, BYUtv		Santa Clara	W 80–74	11–8 (3–1)	Marriott Center (12,709); Provo, UT
January 17, 2019; 9:00 pm, ESPN2		at Pepperdine	W 87–76	12–8 (4–1)	Firestone Fieldhouse (1,714); Malibu, CA
January 19, 2019; 9:00 pm, NBCSBA		at San Francisco	L 63–82	12–9 (4–2)	War Memorial Gymnasium (3,005); San Francisco, CA
January 24, 2019; 9:00 pm, ESPN2		Saint Mary's	W 71–66	13–9 (5–2)	Marriott Center (11,427); Provo, UT
January 31, 2019; 9:00 pm, ESPN2		No. 4 Gonzaga; Rivalry	L 63–93	13–10 (5–3)	Marriott Center (15,396); Provo, UT
February 2, 2019; 7:00 pm, BYUtv		Loyola Marymount	W 67–49	14–10 (6–3)	Marriott Center (11,643); Provo, UT
February 7, 2019; 9:00 pm, ESPN2		at Portland	W 83–48	15–10 (7–3)	Chiles Center (2,581); Portland, OR
February 9, 2019; 7:00 pm, BYUtv		Pacific	W 69–59	16–10 (8–3)	Marriott Center (11,406); Provo, UT
February 14, 2019; 8:00 pm, SPCSN		at San Diego	W 88–82 ^{OT}	17–10 (9–3)	Jenny Craig Pavilion (1,851); San Diego, CA
February 16, 2019; 2:00 pm, SPCSN		at Loyola Marymount	W 70–62	18–10 (10–3)	Gersten Pavilion (3,692); Los Angeles, CA
February 21, 2019; 7:00 pm, BYUtv		San Francisco	L 71–77	18–11 (10–4)	Marriott Center (11,484); Provo, UT
February 23, 2019; 8:00 pm, ESPN		at No. 2 Gonzaga; Rivalry	L 68–102	18–12 (10–5)	McCarthey Athletic Center (6,000); Spokane, WA
March 2, 2019; 7:00 pm, BYUtv		San Diego	W 87–73	19–12 (11–5)	Marriott Center (13,095); Provo, UT
WCC tournament
March 9, 2019; 9:00 pm, ESPN2	(3)	vs. (7) San Diego; Third round	L 57–81	19–13	Orleans Arena (6,882); Paradise, NV
*Non-conference game. ^{#}Rankings from AP Poll. (#) Tournament seedings in parentheses. All times are in Mountain.

== Game summaries ==
=== Cougar Tipoff ===
Broadcasters: Spencer Linton & Kristen Kozlowski
Starting Lineups:

- BYU Blue: Jahshire Hardnett, Taylor Maughan, TJ Haws, Dalton Nixon, Connor Harding
- BYU White: Rylan Bergersen, Yoeli Childs, McKay Cannon, Gavin Baxter, Jesse Wade

byutv.org

Oct 19
7:05 p.m. MDT

Recap

BYU White	77–81	BYU Blue
Scoring by half: 43–36, 34–45
Pts: Yoeli Childs 35; Rebs: Yoeli Childs 9 Asts: McKay Cannon 3		Pts: Jahshire Hardnett, Luke Worthington 18; Rebs: TJ Haws 9 Asts: Jahshire Hardnett 6

Marriott Center
Provo, UT
Attendance: N/A
Referees: N/A

=== Exhibition: Saint Martin's ===
Broadcasters: Dave McCann, Blaine Fowler & Lauren McClain
Starting Lineups:

- Saint Martin's: Jared Matthews, Jordan Kitchen, Rhett Baerlocher, BJ Standley, E.J. Boyce
- BYU: Jahshire Hardnett, Zac Seljaas, Yoeli Childs, TJ Haws, Luke Worthington

BYUtv

Oct 24
7:05 p.m. MDT

Recap

Saint Martin's Saints	71–92	BYU Cougars
Scoring by half: 23–45, 48–47
Pts: BJ Standley 18; Rebs: BJ Standley 6 Asts: BJ Standley 7		Pts: Yoeli Childs 20; Rebs: Yoeli Childs 8 Asts: TJ Haws 7

Marriott Center
Provo, UT
Attendance: N/A
Referees: Casey McClellan, Ryan Holmes, Scott DeBo

=== Exhibition: Westminster ===
Broadcasters: Dave McCann, Blaine Fowler, & Spencer Linton
Starting Lineups:

- Westminster: Brandon Warr, Jake Connor, Joonas Tahvainainen, Alec Monson, Jai Jai Ely
- BYU: Jahshire Hardnett, Zac Seljaas, Yoeli Childs, TJ Haws, Luke Worthington

BYUtv

Nov. 1
7:05 p.m. MDT

Recap

Westminster Griffins	43–72	BYU Cougars
Scoring by half: 18–35, 25–37
Pts: Brandon Warr 12; Rebs: Jacob McCord 6 Asts: Jai Jai Ely 2		Pts: Yoeli Childs 14; Rebs: Yoeli Childs 14; Asts: TJ Haws 4

Marriott Center
Provo, UT
Attendance: N/A
Referees: Deldre Carr, Shawn Lehigh, Ryan Holmes

=== Nevada ===
Series History: BYU leads series 13–6
Broadcasters: Carter Blackburn & Pete Gillen
Starting Lineups:

- BYU: Jahshire Hardnett, Zac Seljaas, Yoeli Childs, TJ Haws, Dalton Nixon
- Nevada: Tre'Shawn Thurman, Caleb Martin, Cody Martin, Trey Porter, Jordan Caroline

CBSSN

Nov 6
8:06 p.m. PST

Recap

BYU Cougars	70–86	#7/9 Nevada Wolf Pack
Scoring by half: 34–34, 36–52
Pts: Jahshire Hardnett 17; Rebs: Yoeli Childs 12; Asts: TJ Haws 5		Pts: Jordan Caroline 25; Rebs: Jordan Caroline 16; Asts: Cody Martin 11

Lawlor Events Center
Reno, NV
Attendance: 11,094
Referees: David Hall, Mike Reed, Larry Spaulding

=== Utah Valley ===
Series History: BYU leads 2–1
Broadcasters: Dave McCann, Blaine Fowler, & Lauren McClain
Starting Lineups:

- Utah Valley: Isaiah White, Jake Toolson, Benjamin Nakwassah, Conner Toolson, Baylee Steele
- BYU: Jahshire Hardnett, Zac Seljaas, Yoeli Childs, TJ Haws, Luke Worthington

BYUtv

Nov. 9
8:05 p.m. MST

Utah Valley Wolverines	65–75	BYU Cougars
Scoring by half: 26–25, 39–50
Pts: Jake Toolson 14; Rebs: Baylee Steele 19; Asts: TJ Washington 4		Pts: TJ Haws 23; Rebs: Yoeli Childs 15; Asts: Jahshire Hardnett, TJ Haws 4

Marriott Center
Provo, UT
Attendance: 14,628
Referees: Verne Harris, John Higgins, Shawn Lehigh

=== Northwestern State ===
Series History: Series even 1–1
Broadcasters: Dave McCann, Blaine Fowler, & Spencer Linton
Starting Lineups:

- Northwestern State: C.J. Jones, LaTerrance Reed, Malik Metoyer, Ishmael Lane, Darian Dixon
- BYU: Jahshire Hardnett, Zac Seljaas, Yoeli Childs, TJ Haws, Dalton Nixon

BYUtv

Nov 13
7:05 p.m. MST

Recap

Northwestern State Demons	57–82	BYU Cougars
Scoring by half: 25–42, 32–40
Pts: Ishmael Lane 18; Rebs: Ishmael Lane, Larry Owens 7 Asts: Ishmael Lane 3		Pts: Yoeli Childs 18; Rebs: Yoeli Childs 15; Asts: TJ Haws 4

Marriott Center
Provo, UT
Attendance: 10,886
Referees: Mike Scyphers, Kelly Pfeifer, Randy Heimerman

=== Oral Roberts ===
Series History: BYU leads 5–0
Broadcasters: Dave McCann, Blaine Fowler, & Spencer Linton
Starting Lineups:

- Oral Roberts: Kaelen Moore, Sam Kearns, Aidan Saunders, Kerwin Smith, Emmanuel Nzekwesi
- BYU: Jahshire Hardnett, Zac Seljaas, Yoeli Childs, TJ Haws, Dalton Nixon

BYUtv

Nov. 15
7:05 p.m. MST

Recap

Oral Roberts Golden Eagles	65–85	BYU Cougars
Scoring by half: 31–43, 34–42
Pts: Kaelen Malone, Kevin Obanor 12; Rebs: Kerwin Smith 8 Asts: Kaelen Malone 7		Pts: Yoeli Childs 24; Rebs: Yoeli Childs 14; Asts: TJ Haws 6

Marriott Center
Provo, UT
Attendance: 10,179
Referees: Tony Padilla, Deldre Carr, Steve Olson

=== Alabama A&M ===
Series History: First Meeting
Broadcasters: Dave McCann, Blaine Fowler, & Spencer Linton
Starting Lineups:

- Alabama A&M: Jalen Reeder, Andre Kennedy, Brandon Miller, Gerron Scissum, Walter Jones Jr.
- BYU: Jahshire Hardnett, Zac Seljaas, Yoeli Childs, TJ Haws, Dalton Nixon

BYUtv

Nov 17
4:05 p.m. MST

Recap

Alabama A&M Bulldogs	60–91	BYU Cougars
Scoring by half: 24–46, 36–45
Pts: Evan Wiley 18; Rebs: Andre Kennedy 9 Asts: Evan Wiley 5		Pts: TJ Haws 19; Rebs: Yoeli Childs 12; Asts: TJ Haws 6

Marriott Center
Provo, UT
Attendance: 12,206
Referees: Verne Harris, Eric Curry, Rick Randall

=== Rice ===
Series History: BYU leads 5–2
Broadcasters: Dave McCann, Blaine Fowler, & Spencer Linton
Starting Lineups:

- Rice: Josh Parrish, Ako Adams, Drew Peterson, Jack Williams, Quentin Millora-Brow
- BYU: Jahshire Hardnett, Zac Seljaas, Yoeli Childs, TJ Haws, Dalton Nixon

BYUtv

Nov. 21
7:05 p.m. MST

Recap

Rice Owls	78–105	BYU Cougars
Scoring by half: 43–54, 35–51
Pts: Ako Adams 17; Rebs: Jack Williams 7 Asts: Quentin Millora-Brow, Robert Martin 3		Pts: Yoeli Childs 28; Rebs: Yoeli Childs, Connor Harding 7 Asts: TJ Haws 8

Marriott Center
Provo, UT
Attendance: 11,631
Referees: Glen Mayberry, Kelly Pfeifer, Larry Spaulding

=== Houston ===
Series History: Houston leads series 4–2
Broadcasters: Dave McCann, Blaine Fowler, & Lauren McClain
Starting Lineups:

- Houston: Armoni Brooks, Corey Davis Jr., Cedrick Alley Jr., Breaon Bradley, Galen Robinson Jr.
- BYU: Jahshire Hardnett, Zac Seljaas, Yoeli Childs, TJ Haws, Dalton Nixon

BYUtv

Nov 24
4:05 p.m. MST

Recap

Houston Cougars	76–62	BYU Cougars
Scoring by half: 37–32, 30–30
Pts: Corey Davis Jr. 24; Rebs: Breaon Bradley 7 Asts: Cedrick Alley Jr., Galen Robinson Jr. 6		Pts: TJ Haws 25; Rebs: Yoeli Childs 9 Asts: Dalton Nixon, Zac Seljaas 4

Marriott Center
Provo, UT
Attendance: 10,959
Referees: Ryan McDaniel, Daryl Gelinas, Kevin Brill

=== Illinois State ===
Series History: BYU leads series 1–0
Broadcasters: Scott Warmann, & Rich Zvosec
Starting Lineups:

- BYU: Jahshire Hardnett, Zac Seljaas, Yoeli Childs, TJ Haws, Dalton Nixon
- Illinois State: Zach Copeland, Keyshawn Evans, Phil Fayne, Josh Jefferson, Milik Yarbrough

ESPN+

Nov. 28
7:00 p.m. CST

Recap

BYU Cougars 89, Illinois State Red Birds 92 (OT)
Scoring by half: 40–31, 38–47 Overtime: 11–14
Pts: Yoeli Childs 27; Rebs: Yoeli Childs 16; Asts: Yoeli Childs, TJ Haws 6	Pts: Phil Fayne 20; Rebs: Phil Fayne 10; Asts: Zach Copeland 7

Redbird Arena
Normal, IL
Attendance: 6,187
Referees: John Higgins, Tony Padilla, David Hall

=== Weber State ===
Series History: BYU leads series 33–10
Broadcasters: Dave Fox & Lance Allred
Starting Lineups:

- BYU: Jahshire Hardnett, Zac Seljaas, Yoeli Childs, TJ Haws, Dalton Nixon
- Weber State: Cody John, Jerrick Harding, Israel Barnes, Brekkott Chapman, Zach Braxton

KJZZ

Dec 1
7:00 p.m. MST

Recap

BYU Cougars	103–113	Weber State Wildcats
Scoring by half: 46–47, 57–66
Pts: Yoeli Childs 31; Rebs: Yoeli Childs 7 Asts: Yoeli Childs, TJ Haws, McKay Cannon 3		Pts: Jerrick Harding 30; Rebs: Zach Braxton 11; Asts: Brekkott Chapman 5

Dee Events Center
Ogden, UT
Attendance: 9,731
Referees: Shawn Lehigh, Deldre Carr, Levon Zakarian

=== Utah State ===
Series History: BYU leads series 142–92
Broadcasters: Dave McCann, Blaine Fowler, & Spencer Linton
Starting Lineups:

- Utah State: Crew Ainge, Sam Merrill, Quinn Taylor, Brock Miller, Neemias Queta
- BYU: Jahshire Hardnett, Zac Seljaas, Yoeli Childs, McKay Cannon, TJ Haws

BYUtv

Dec. 5
7:05 p.m. MST

Recap

Utah State Aggies	80–95	BYU Cougars
Scoring by half: 34–53, 46–42
Pts: Sam Merrill 17; Rebs: Neemias Queta 8 Asts: Sam Merrill, Quinn Taylor 2		Pts: Yoeli Childs 31; Rebs: Yoeli Childs 7 Asts: TJ Haws 7

Marriott Center
Provo, UT
Attendance: 11,377
Referees: Larry Spaulding, Michael Irving, Frank Harvey III

=== Utah ===
Series History: BYU leads series 130–128
Broadcasters: Roxy Bernstein & Caron Butler
Starting Lineups:

- Utah: Sedrick Barefield, Donnie Tillman, Parker Van Dyke, Riley Battin, Jayce Johnson
- BYU: Jahshire Hardnett, Zac Seljaas, Yoeli Childs, TJ Haws, Connor Harding

ESPNU

Dec 8
12:00 p.m. MST

BYU Cougars	74–59	Utah Runnin' Utes
Scoring by half: 32–28, 42–31
Pts: Yoeli Childs 31; Rebs: Yoeli Childs 11; Asts: TJ Haws 4		Pts: Sedrick Barefield 16; Rebs: Riley Battin 6 Asts: Riley Battin 5

Vivint Smart Home Arena
Salt Lake City, UT
Referees: David Hall, Gregory Nixon, Mike Scyphers

=== Portland State ===
Series History: BYU leads series 1–0
Broadcasters: Dave McCann, Blaine Fowler, & Spencer Linton
Starting Lineups:

- Portland State: Derek Brown, Michael Mayhew, Holland Woods, Brendan Rumel, Hamie Orme
- BYU: Jahshire Hardnett, Zac Seljaas, Yoeli Childs, TJ Haws, Connor Harding

BYUtv

Dec. 12
7:05 p.m. MST

Recap

Portland State Vikings	66–85	BYU Cougars
Scoring by half: 32–45, 34–40
Pts: Derek Brown 14; Rebs: Michael Mayhew 6 Asts: Holland Woods 5		Pts: TJ Haws 30; Rebs: Yoeli Childs 6 Asts: Nick Emery 6

Marriott Center
Provo, UT
Attendance: 11,563
Referees: Kelly Pfeifer, Tomny Nunez, John Higgins

=== UNLV ===
Series History: UNLV leads series 18–16
Broadcasters: Eric Rothman & Sean Farnham
Starting Lineups:

- BYU: Jahshire Hardnett, Zac Seljaas, Yoeli Childs, TJ Haws, Connor Harding
- UNLV: Kris Clyburn, Noah Robotham, Joel Ntambwe, Jonathan Tchamwa Tchatchoua, Cheikh Mbacke Diong

ESPN3

Dec 15
5:30 p.m. PST

Recap

BYU Cougars	90–92 (OT)	UNLV Runnin' Rebels
Scoring by half: 30–47, 53–36 Overtime: 7–9
Pts: Yoeli Childs 25; Rebs: Yoeli Childs 11; Asts: TJ Haws 6		Pts: Joel Ntambwe 22; Rebs: Joel Ntambwe 11; Asts: Amauri Harding 6

T-Mobile Arena
Paradise, NV
Attendance: 5,107
Referees: Verne Harris, Mike Reed, Winston Smith

=== San Diego State ===
Series History: BYU leads series 48–24
Broadcasters: Carter Blackburn & Pete Gillen
Starting Lineups:

- BYU: Jahshire Hardnett, Zac Seljaas, Yoeli Childs, TJ Haws, Connor Harding
- San Diego State: Devin Watson, Jalen McDaniels, Matt Mitchell, Jordan Schakel, Jeremy Hemsley

CBSSN

Dec. 22
4:00 p.m. PST

Recap

BYU Cougars	81–90	San Diego State Aztecs
Scoring by half: 38–52, 43–38
Pts: TJ Haws 18; Rebs: Yoeli Childs 6 Asts: TJ Haws 5		Pts: Devin Watson 23; Rebs: Jordan Schakel 8 Asts: Devin Watson 8

Viejas Arena
San Diego, CA
Attendance: 11,321
Referees: David Hall, Deldre Carr, Steve Olson

=== Mississippi State ===
Series History: Series even 1–1
Broadcasters: Kevin Fitzgerald & Daymeon Fishback
Starting Lineups:

- BYU: Jahshire Hardnett, Zac Seljaas, Yoeli Childs, TJ Haws, Connor Harding
- Mississippi State: Nick Weatherspoon, Lamar Peters, Quinndary Weatherspoon, Abdul Ado, Aric Holman

ESPNU

Dec 29
11:00 a.m. CST

Recap

BYU Cougars	81–103	#19/17 Mississippi State Bulldogs
Scoring by half: 38–48, 43–55
Pts: Yoeli Childs 25; Rebs: TJ Haws, Luke Worthington 6 Asts: TJ Haws, McKay Cannon 3		Pts: Aric Holman 28; Rebs: Aric Holman, Reggie Perry 8 Asts: Lamar Peters 6

Humphrey Coliseum
Starkville, MS
Attendance: 10,202
Referees: Anthony Jordan, Olandis Poole, Rob Rorke

=== Pacific ===
Series History: BYU leads series 10–6
Broadcasters: Steve Quis & Richie Schueler
Starting Lineups:

- BYU: Yoeli Childs, McKay Cannon, TJ Haws, Luke Worthington, Connor Harding
- Pacific: Jahlil Tripp, Lafayette Dorsey, Anthony Townes, Brandon McGhee, Ajare Sanni

ESPNU

Jan. 3
8:00 p.m. PST

Recap

BYU Cougars	90–87	Pacific Tigers
Scoring by half: 49–37, 41–50
Pts: TJ Haws 24; Rebs: Yoeli Childs 12; Asts: TJ Haws 6		Pts: Roberto Gallinat 22; Rebs: Zach Cameron 8 Asts: Brandon McGhee 3

Alex G. Spanos Center
Stockton, CA
Attendance: 2,490
Referees: Gregory Nixon, Shawn Lehigh, Scott Brown

=== Saint Mary's ===
Series History: Series even 13–13
Broadcasters: Dave Feldman & Adrian Branch
Starting Lineups:

- BYU: Yoeli Childs, McKay Cannon, TJ Haws, Luke Worthington, Connor Harding
- Saint Mary's: Tanner Krebs, Jordan Hunter, Jordan Ford, Tommy Kuhse, Malik Fitts

ESPN2

Jan. 5
8:00 p.m. PST

Recap

BYU Cougars	66–88	Saint Mary's Gaels
Scoring by half: 32–42, 34–46
Pts: Yoeli Childs 21; Rebs: Yoeli Childs 12; Asts: Yoeli Childs, Luke Worthington, Connor Harding 2		Pts: Jordan Ford 23; Rebs: Malik Fitts 9 Asts: Jordan Ford 4

McKeon Pavilion
Moraga, CA
Attendance: 3,500
Referees: Tony Padilla, Larry Spaulding, Tom Spitznagel

=== Portland ===
Series History: BYU leads series 18–2
Broadcasters: Dave McCann, Blaine Fowler, & Spencer Linton
Starting Lineups:

- Portland: Jojo Walker, Marcus Shaver Jr., Josh McSwiggan, Theo Akwuba, Tahirou Diabate
- BYU: Yoeli Childs, McKay Cannon, TJ Haws, Luke Worthington, Connor Harding

BYUtv

Jan. 10
7:05 p.m. MST

Recap

Portland Pilots	56–79	BYU Cougars
Scoring by half: 30–36, 26–43
Pts: Franklin Porter 14; Rebs: Theo Akwuba 7 Asts: Jojo Walker 3		Pts: Yoeli Childs 28; Rebs: Yoeli Childs 12; Asts: TJ Haws 7

Marriott Center
Provo, UT
Attendance: 10,733
Referees: Tommy Nunez, Brent Meaux, Jimmy Casas

=== Santa Clara ===
Series History: BYU leads series 30–6
Broadcasters: Dave McCann, Blaine Fowler, & Spencer Linton
Starting Lineups:

- Santa Clara: Trey Wertz, Tahj Eaddy, Josip Vrankic, Josh Martin, Guglielmo Caruso
- BYU: Yoeli Childs, McKay Cannon, TJ Haws, Luke Worthington, Connor Harding

BYUtv

Jan. 12
7:05 p.m. MST

Recap

Santa Clara Broncos	74–80	BYU Cougars
Scoring by half: 33–40, 41–40
Pts: Trey Wertz 20; Rebs: Josip Vrankic 10; Asts: Trey Wertz 5		Pts: Yoeli Childs 27; Rebs: Yoeli Childs 6 Asts: TJ Haws 8

Marriott Center
Provo, UT
Attendance: 12,709
Referees: Coban Lopez, Ruben Ramos, Eric Curry

=== Pepperdine ===
Series History: BYU leads series 13–9
Broadcasters: Eric Rothman & Adrian Branch
Starting Lineups:

- BYU: Yoeli Childs, McKay Cannon, TJ Haws, Luke Worthington, Connor Harding
- Pepperdine: Colbey Ross, Jade' Smith, Darnell Dunn, Kameron Edwards, Eric Cooper Jr.

ESPNU

Jan. 17
8:00 p.m. PST

Recap

BYU Cougars	87–76	Pepperdine Waves
Scoring by half: 44–35, 43–41
Pts: TJ Haws 24; Rebs: Zac Seljaas 10; Asts: TJ Haws 8		Pts: Colbey Ross 24; Rebs: Jade' Smith, Kessler Edwards 9 Asts: Colbey Ross 5

Firestone Fieldhouse
Malibu, CA
Attendance: 1,714
Referees: Rob Rorke, Shawn Lehigh, Mike Reed

=== San Francisco ===
Series History: BYU leads series 19–6
Broadcasters: Barry Tompkins & Kelenna Azubuike
Starting Lineups:

- BYU: Yoeli Childs, McKay Cannon, TJ Haws, Luke Worthington, Connor Harding
- San Francisco: Frankie Ferrari, Jimbo Lull, Charles Minlend, Nate Renfro, Jordan Ratinho

TheW.tv

Jan. 19
8:00 p.m. PST

Recap

BYU Cougars	63–82	San Francisco Dons
Scoring by half: 29–43, 34–39
Pts: Yoeli Childs 25; Rebs: Zac Seljaas 7 Asts: Yoeli Childs, TJ Haws 2		Pts: Frankie Ferrari 21; Rebs: Matt McCarthy 7 Asts: Frankie Ferrari 7

The Sobrato Center
San Francisco, CA
Attendance: 3,005
Referees: Randy McCall, Gregory Nixon, Tom Spitznagel

=== Saint Mary's ===
Series History: Saint Mary's leads series 14–13
Broadcasters: Steve Quis & Dan Dickau
Starting Lineups:

- Saint Mary's: Tanner Krebs, Jordan Hunter, Jordan Ford, Tommy Kuhse, Malik Fitts
- BYU: Yoeli Childs, McKay Cannon, TJ Haws, Luke Worthington, Connor Harding

ESPN2

Jan. 24
9:05 p.m. MST

Recap

Saint Mary's Gaels	66–71	BYU Cougars
Scoring by half: 26–33, 40–38
Pts: Malik Fitts 19; Rebs: Jordan Hunter 10; Asts: Jordan Ford 3		Pts: Yoeli Childs 23; Rebs: Yoeli Childs 11; Asts: TJ Haws 7

Marriott Center
Provo, UT
Attendance: 11,427
Referees: Bill Vinovich, Shawn Lehigh, David Hall

=== Gonzaga ===
Series History: Gonzaga leads series 15–6
Broadcasters: Dave Feldman & Dan Dickau
Starting Lineups:

- Gonzaga: Josh Perkins, Brandon Clarke, Rui Hachimura, Zach Norvell Jr., Coery Kispert
- BYU: Yoeli Childs, McKay Cannon, TJ Haws, Luke Worthington, Connor Harding

ESPN2

Jan. 31
9:00 p.m. MST

Recap

#4/4 Gonzaga Buldogs	93–63	BYU Cougars
Scoring by half: 41–24, 52–39
Pts: Brandon Clarke 23; Rebs: Brandon Clarke, Rui Hachimura 9 Asts: Josh Perkins 10		Pts: TJ Haws 16; Rebs: Yoeli Childs 7 Asts: Yoeli Childs 3

Marriott Center
Provo, UT
Attendance: 15,396
Referees: Deldre Carr, Larry Spaulding, Michael Irving

=== Loyola Marymount ===
Series History: BYU leads series 14–5
Broadcasters: Dave McCann, Blaine Fowler, & Spencer Linton
Starting Lineups:

- Loyola Marymount: Eli Scott, James Batemon, Dameane Douglas, Mattias Markusson, Jeffery McClendon
- BYU: Yoeli Childs, Gavin Baxter, McKay Cannon, TJ Haws, Connor Harding

BYUtv

Feb. 2
7:05 p.m. MST

Recap

Loyola Marymount Lions	49–67	BYU Cougars
Scoring by half: 26–23, 23–44
Pts: Dameane Douglas 10; Rebs: Dameane Douglas 7 Asts: Eli Scott 2		Pts: Gavin Baxter 25; Rebs: Gavin Baxter 10; Asts: McKay Cannon 7

Marriott Center
Provo, UT
Attendance: 11,643
Referees: Jeff Wooten, Ron Brokenbrough, David Hall

=== Portland ===
Series History: BYU leads series 19–2
Broadcasters: Steve Quis & Richie Schueler
Starting Lineups:

- BYU: Nick Emery, Yoeli Childs, McKay Cannon, Gavin Baxter, TJ Haws
- Portland: JoJo Walker, Marcus Shaver Jr., Theo Akwuba, Franklin Porter, Jacob Tryon

ESPN2

Feb. 7
8:00 p.m. PST

Recap

BYU Cougars	83–48	Portland Pilots
Scoring by half: 40–21, 43–27
Pts: TJ Haws 22; Rebs: Yoeli Childs 11; Asts: Nick Emery 5		Pts: Tahirou Diabate 8 Rebs: Marcus Shaver Jr., Franklin Porter 4 Asts: JoJo Walker 3

Chiles Center
Portland, OR
Attendance: 2,581
Referees: Deldre Carr, Kelly Self, Mike Scyphers

=== Pacific ===
Series History: BYU leads series 11–6
Broadcasters: Dave McCann, Blaine Fowler, & Spencer Linton
Starting Lineups:

- Pacific: Jahlil Tripp, Roberto Galliant, Anthony Townes, Jeremiah Bailey, Kendall Small
- BYU: Nick Emery, Yoeli Childs, McKay Cannon, Gavin Baxter, TJ Haws

BYUtv

Feb. 9
7:05 p.m. MST

Recap

Pacific Tigers	59–69	BYU Cougars
Scoring by half: 30–33, 29–36
Pts: Roberto Gallinat 15; Rebs: Anthony Townes 13; Asts: Jahlil Tripp, Kendall Small 2		Pts: Yoeli Childs 19; Rebs: Yoeli Childs 13; Asts: TJ Haws 7

Marriott Center
Provo, UT
Attendance: 11,406
Referees: Mark Fulton, Winston Smith, Tommy Nunez

=== San Diego ===
Series History: BYU leads series 14–5
Broadcasters: Steve Quis & Casey Jacobsen
Starting Lineups:

- BYU: Nick Emery, Yoeli Childs, McKay Cannon, Gavin Baxter, TJ Haws
- San Diego: Isaiah Pineiro, Tyler Williams, Olin Carter III, Isaiah Wright, Yauhen Massalski

ATTRM

Feb. 14
7:00 p.m. PST

Recap

BYU Cougars	88–82 (OT)	San Diego Toreros
Scoring by half: 30–39, 45–36 Overtime: 13–7
Pts: TJ Haws 35; Rebs: Yoeli Childs 12; Asts: TJ Haws 7		Pts: Isaiah Pineiro, Olin Carter III 20; Rebs: Isaiah Pineiro 12; Asts: Isaiah Wright 7

Jenny Craig Pavilion
San Diego, CA
Attendance: 1,851
Referees: Mike Reed, Casey McClellan, Ryan McDaniel

=== Loyola Marymount ===
Series History: BYU leads series 15–5
Broadcasters: Steve Quis, Ryan Hollins, & Kirsten Watson
Starting Lineups:

- BYU: Nick Emery, Yoeli Childs, McKay Cannon, Gavin Baxter, TJ Haws
- Loyola Marymount: Eli Scott, James Batemon, Dameane Douglas, Mattias Markusson, Jeffery McClendon

ATTRM

Feb. 16
1:00 p.m. PST

Recap

BYU Cougars	70–62	Loyola Marymount Lions
Scoring by half: 30–36, 40–26
Pts: Yoeli Childs 18; Rebs: Gavin Baxter 7 Asts: TJ Haws 8		Pts: James Batemon 16; Rebs: Mattias Markusson 6 Asts: Eli Scott 7

Gersten Pavilion
Los Angeles, CA
Attendance: 3,692
Referees: Ruben Ramos, Coban Lopez, Tony Doolittle

=== San Francisco ===
Series History: BYU leads series 19–7
Broadcasters: Dave McCann, Blaine Fowler & Spencer Linton
Starting Lineups:

- San Francisco: Frankie Ferrari, Jimbo Lull, Charles Minlend, Nate Renfro, Jordan Ratinho
- BYU: Nick Emery, Yoeli Childs, McKay Cannon, TJ Haws, Gavin Baxter

BYUtv

Feb. 21
7:05 p.m. MST

Recap

San Francisco Dons	77–71	BYU Cougars
Scoring by half: 29–43, 34–39
Pts: Frankie Ferrari 23; Rebs: Frankie Ferrari, Matt McCarthy 6 Asts: Frankie Ferrari 7		Pts: Yoeli Childs 28; Rebs: Yoeli Childs 14; Asts: Nick Emery, Yoeli Childs, McKay Cannon 3

Marriott Center
Provo, UT
Attendance: 11,484
Referees: Rick O'Neill, Larry Spaulding, Bob Staffen

=== Gonzaga ===
Series History: Gonzaga leads series 16–6
Broadcasters: Eric Rothman & Sean Farnham
Starting Lineups:

- BYU: Nick Emery, Yoeli Childs, McKay Cannon, TJ Haws, Gavin Baxter
- Gonzaga: Geno Crandall, Jack Beach, Josh Perkins, Rui Hachimura, Jeremy Jones

ESPN

Feb. 23
7:00 p.m. PST

Recap

BYU Cougars	68–102	#2/2 Gonzaga Buldogs
Scoring by half: 38–51, 30–51
Pts: Yoeli Childs, TJ Haws 18; Rebs: Yoeli Childs 7 Asts: TJ Haws 8		Pts: Zach Norvell Jr. 25; Rebs: Rui Hachimura, Brandon Clarke 10; Asts: Josh Perkins 7

McCarthey Athletic Center
Spokane, WA
Attendance: 6,000
Referees: Gregory Nixon, Eric Curry, Shawn Lehigh

=== San Diego ===
Series History: BYU leads series 15–5
Broadcasters: Dave McCann, Blaine Fowler & Spencer Linton
Starting Lineups:

- San Diego: Isaiah Pineiro, Yauhen Massalski, Isaiah Wright, Tyler Williams, Olin Carter III
- BYU: Luke Worthington, Yoeli Childs, TJ Haws, McKay Cannon, Nick Emery

BYUtv

Mar. 2
7:05 p.m. MST

Recap

San Diego Toreros	73–87	BYU Cougars
Scoring by half: 32–41, 41–46
Pts: Isaiah Wright 19; Rebs: Isaiah Pineiro 10; Asts: Wright, Carter III 3		Pts: Yoeli Childs 29; Rebs: Yoeli Childs 13; Asts: Haws, Seljaas 4

Marriott Center
Provo, UT
Attendance: 13,095
Referees: Randy McCall, Rick Batsell, Scott Brown
