= Richardson High School =

Magnet high school in Texas, United States

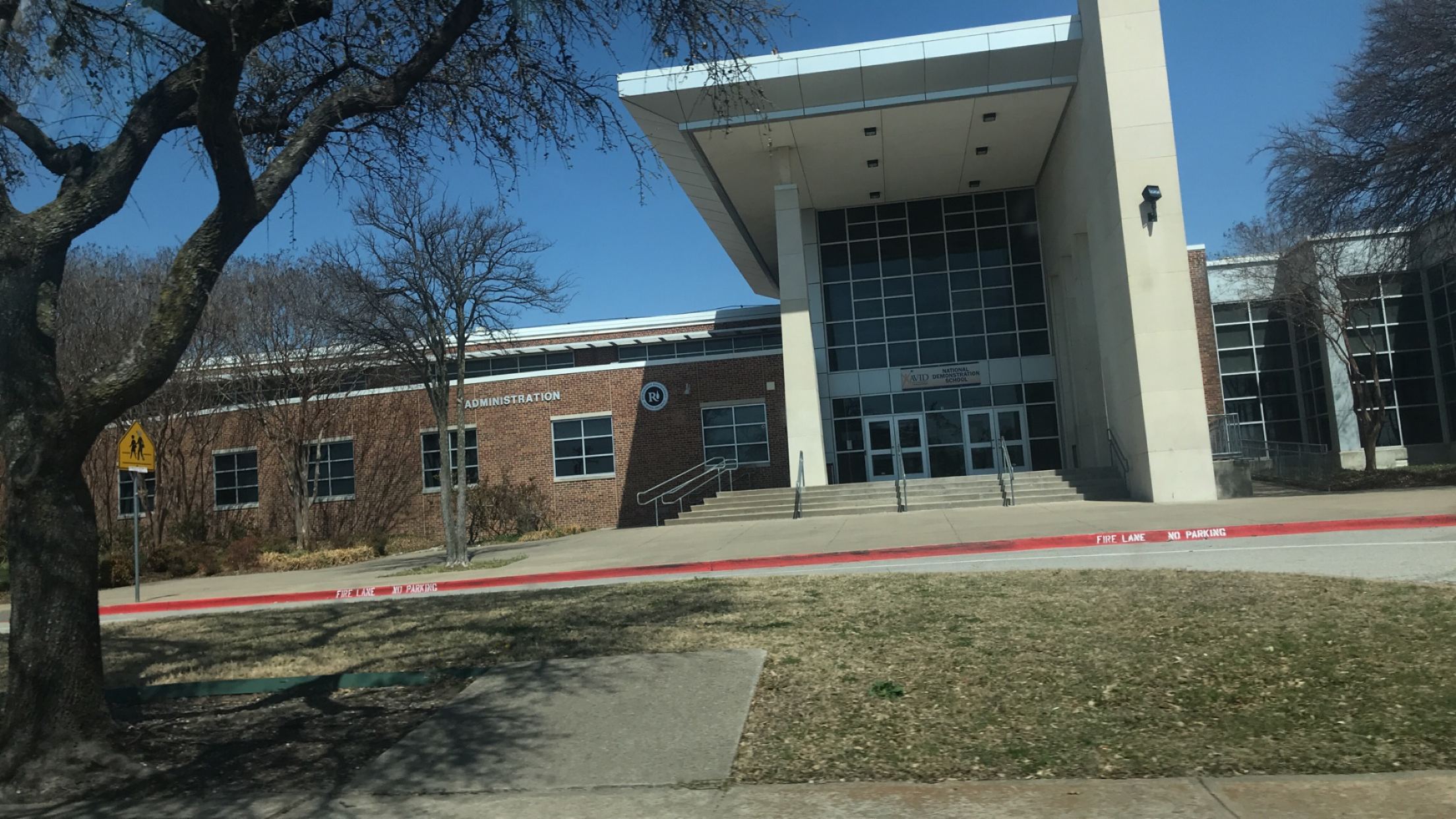
- Richardson High School in 2021

Location
- 1250 West Belt Line Road; Richardson, Dallas County, Texas 75080; United States; 32°57′09″N 96°45′45″W

Information
- Type: High school/secondary school
- Motto: Scientia Cum Prudentia
- Established: 1890 (1963 - current facility)
- School district: Richardson Independent School District
- Principal: Chris Choat
- Teaching staff: 206.11 (FTE)
- Grades: 9–12
- Enrollment: 2,773 (2022–2023)
- Student to teacher ratio: 13.45
- Colors: Purple and gold
- Mascot: Eagle
- Nickname: RHS
- Publication: The Talon
- Feeder schools: Westwood Junior High School Richardson West Junior High School
- Magnet Programs: Law, culinary arts, visual arts, photography/photo media arts, theater, tech theater, communications, robotics, science, and computer science
- Website: Richardson High School Website

Richardson High School (RHS) is a magnet high school in Richardson, Texas, United States with approximately 2,770 students and a student/teacher ratio of approximately 15:1 in the 2018–2019 school year. It is the oldest high school in the Richardson Independent School District (RISD).

Richardson High School is the flagship high school of the Richardson Independent School District (RISD). The school has many magnet programs, such as culinary arts, theater, visual arts, tech theater, communications, robotics, law, science, and computer science. The school also has award-winning mock trial, debate, and computer science teams.

== History ==
The school opened shortly after the first public school in the city was burned down by Ross Inman in 1890. The fire began in a two-room building on Old Pike Road, a street that is now part of Greenville Avenue. A rural school with fewer than 100 students up to 1950, the school opened its present facility in 1961. During the period of the late 1950s, RHS shared facilities with Westwood Junior High School on Abrams Road. Bill Passmore was principal during this transition into the new facility on Belt Line Road.

=== Jeremy Wade Delle suicide ===
On January 8, 1991, Jeremy Wade Delle, a 15-year-old sophomore, fatally shot himself with a .357 Magnum in front of his second-period English class. The incident inspired the Pearl Jam song "Jeremy".

=== Brent Archie scandal ===
On July 30, 2008, teacher and coach Brent Archie was arrested on charges of having relationships with three female students. Archie was a football and wrestling coach, and also taught Advancement Via Individual Determination (AVID) and World History. This was the first incident of its kind in RISD history.

== Athletics ==
Richardson's sports mascot is the Eagle; students, teachers, and alumni are referred to as Eagles; and the team shares Eagle-Mustang Stadium (capacity 12,000) with J. J. Pearce High School.

The school was the University Interscholastic League State Champions for Men's & Woman's Soccer in 1985.

== Notable accomplishments ==
The school was recognized as a National Blue Ribbon School in the 1983–84 school year.

In August 2006, Richardson High School was named one of three "best practices" high schools in the state of Texas. The award granted by the National Council of Educational Accountability and the Just 4 Kids Foundation is based upon staff development, staff retention, standardized test scores and support programs for students.

In May 2007, the RISD was awarded the "Excellence in Education Award for Large School District in Texas" by the HEB Foundation. Richardson High School and Richardson West Junior High played instrumental roles in the selection process and hosted the site visit committee in March 2007. In addition to the award, the RISD received a check for $100,000.

In the 2012 U.S. News & World Report rankings of the Best Schools in America, Richardson High School ranked number 711 out of 21,766 public high schools, putting it in the top 3.5% of all public high schools in the United States. RHS was also rated the 65th best in the state of Texas.

In 2015, 2016, and 2017, Richardson High School was one of the few hundred schools in the state of Texas, and the only high school in RISD to earn all 7 distinctions in the STAAR state assessment.

== Notable alumni ==
- Brandon Averette, professional basketball player
- William Basinski, Composer, electronic/ambient musician
- Evan Bernstein, Israeli Olympic wrestler
- Jarek Broussard, American football running back (transferred to Bishop Lynch High School)
- Gregg Costa, judge in United States District Court for the Southern District of Texas
- Tim Cowlishaw, sportswriter, TV personality
- Catherine Crier, news and Television personality
- Mark Dodd, soccer player
- Brandon Douglas, American actor
- Jeff Dunham, ventriloquist
- Stephanie Dunnam, actress
- Bill Engvall, comedian and actor.
- David Gordon Green, film writer-director
- Norma Hunt, minority owner of the Kansas City Chiefs
- Eddie Jackson, chef and football player
- Robert Jeffress, pastor of the First Baptist Church of Dallas
- Jay Johnson, ventriloquist and actor
- Caleb Landry Jones, actor
- Gordon Keith, radio personality
- Jake McDorman, actor
- Drew Moss, NFL player
- Adam Saunders, American filmmaker
- Carla Overbeck, soccer player and coach
- Jeff Paine, NFL player
- Anne Rice, Vampire series author
- John Maddox Roberts, author
- Bill Scanlon, tennis player
- Cason Wallace, professional basketball player
- Keaton Wallace, professional basketball player
- Barry Watson, actor

== Media ==
In 2009, the school's student news team started a public, student-written magazine known as The Talon.

=== KRET-TV ===
In 1960 the Richardson Independent School District established KRET, the first TV station in the nation to be owned by a school district. The studio was located at Richardson High from 1963–1970. The studio was previously located at Richardson Junior High School (1960–1963). The station was converted on August 31, 1970, into a closed-circuit network named "TAGER".
