= Brandon Averette =

American basketball player (born 1997)

Personal information
- Born: September 22, 1997 (age 29) Richardson, Texas, U.S.
- Listed height: 5 ft 11 in (1.80 m)
- Listed weight: 184 lb (83 kg)

Career information
- High school: Richardson (Richardson, Texas, U.S.)
- College: Oklahoma State (2016–2018); Utah Valley (2018–2020); Brigham Young (2020–2021)
- Playing career: 2022–present
- Position: Point guard

Career history
- 2021–2023: AEL Limassol B.C.
- 2023–2024: Etoile Angers Basket
- 2024–2025: SG ART Giants Düsseldorf
- 2025: EPG Guardians Koblenz
- 2025: BBC Résidence
- 2025-2026: Njarðvík
- 2026: Ármann

Career highlights
- WAC All-Newcomer Team (2020); All-WCC Second Team (2021)

Brandon Michael-Andre Averette (born September 22, 1997) is an American professional basketball player. He played college basketball for Oklahoma State University, Utah Valley University and Brigham Young University.

== Early life and high school ==
Averette attended Richardson High School where he led all DFW area 6A players in scoring in 2016 with an average of 22.6 points per game. He was a two-time District 10-6A Most Valuable Player and a two-time All-Region selection by the Texas Association of Basketball Coaches.

The summer after his junior year of high school, he played for Mo Williams AAU team, Mo Williams Academy.

== College career ==
=== Oklahoma State University (2016–2018) ===
On April 14, 2016, Brad Underwood signed Averette to come to Oklahoma State University. Averette originally signed with Underwood at Stephen F. Austin University the November following his junior season but changed his commitment.

On December 12, 2016, he earned Big 12 Conference Newcomer of the Week. In his first career start, he had a game high and career-high 17 points, 3 rebounds, and 3 assists.

=== Utah Valley University (2018–2020) ===
In May 2018, he signed a grant in-aid award to play for Utah Valley University. He would have to sit out the 2018–2019 season due to NCAA Transfer Rules and was eligible to play for the 2019–2020 season.

In October 2019, he earned preseason All-WAC second team honors. On November 18, 2019, he was named the College Sports Madness WAC Player of the Week for averaging 17.5 points, 2 rebounds, and 1 block in a set of games. On March 10, 2020, he was named to the WAC Men's Basketball All-Newcomer Team. He became the fourth player in school history to be named to the All-Newcomer team.

=== Brigham Young University (2020–2021) ===
In June 2020, Averette transferred to Brigham Young University. He graduated from Utah Valley University in the summer and was eligible to play as a senior in 2020–2021.

On March 1, 2021, Averette earned All-WCC Second Team. He had the season's highest single game scoring total with 30 points against Texas Southern University. He was the only player to reach the 30-point plateau in a game that season.

== Professional career ==
=== AEL Limassol (2020–2022) ===
On July 16, 2021, he signed with AEL Limassol B.C. to begin his professional career.

In November 2021, Averette was injured alongside his teammate Corey Manigault after being beaten during a brawl outside of a club. His teammate had been hospitalized with brain hemorrhage and hematoma. Averette and Manigault's girlfriend suffered cuts and abrasions on various parts of their body.

=== ART Giants Duesseldorf (2024–2025) ===
On January 3, 2025, Averette signed with SG ART Giants Düsseldorf for the 2024–2025 season after average 13 points and 3.8 assists with Etoile.

=== Iceland (2025-2026) ===
On September 8, 2025, he signed with UMFN Njardvik. On October 19, 2025, he received a Hoops Agents Player of the Week award after having a game-high 37 points, 4 rebounds and 9 assists. In January, he moved to Ármann where he appeared in 6 games, averaging 10.0 points.

== Personal life ==
Averette is the son of Randy and Belinda Averette.
