= Gonzaga Bulldogs men's basketball statistical leaders =

The Gonzaga Bulldogs men's basketball statistical leaders are individual statistical leaders of the Gonzaga Bulldogs men's basketball program in various categories, including points, three-pointers, rebounds, assists, steals, and blocks. Within those areas, the lists identify single-game, single-season, and career leaders. The Bulldogs represent Gonzaga University in the NCAA Division I Pac-12 Conference.

Gonzaga began competing in intercollegiate basketball in 1907. However, the school's record book does not generally list records from before the 1950s, as records from before this period are often incomplete and inconsistent. Since scoring was much lower in this era, and teams played much fewer games during a typical season, it is likely that few or no players from this era would appear on these lists anyway.

Official NCAA basketball records date only to the 1937–38 season, the first of what it calls the "modern era" of men's basketball, following the abolition of the center jump after each made basket. Official statistical rankings in scoring began in 1947–48. Individual assists and rebounds were first recorded in the 1950–51 season. Rebounds have been recorded in each subsequent season, but the NCAA stopped recording individual assists after the 1951–52 season, not resuming this practice until the 1983–84 season. Blocks and steals were first officially recorded in 1985–86, and three-pointers followed in 1986–87, the first season in which the three-pointer was made mandatory throughout college men's basketball at a standardized distance. Gonzaga's record books, however, include all of the school's basketball seasons, regardless of whether the NCAA officially recorded statistics in the relevant seasons.

These lists are updated through the end of the 2024–25 season.

== Scoring ==
Career
Rk	Player	Points	Seasons
1	Drew Timme	2,307	2019–20 2020–21 2021–22 2022–23
2	Frank Burgess	2,196	1958–59 1959–60 1960–61
3	Jim McPhee	2,015	1986–87 1987–88 1988–89 1989–90
4	Adam Morrison	1,867	2003–04 2004–05 2005–06
5	Elias Harris	1,857	2009–10 2010–11 2011–12 2012–13
6	Kevin Pangos	1,824	2011–12 2012–13 2013–14 2014–15
7	Matt Santangelo	1,810	1996–97 1997–98 1998–99 1999–2000
8	Graham Ike	1,797	2023–24 2024–25 2025–26
9	Ronny Turiaf	1,723	2001–02 2002–03 2003–04 2004–05
10	Matt Bouldin	1,683	2006–07 2007–08 2008–09 2009–10

Season
Rk	Player	Points	Season
1	Adam Morrison	926	2005–06
2	Frank Burgess	842	1960–61
3	Drew Timme	786	2022–23
4	Frank Burgess	751	1959–60
5	Kyle Wiltjer	736	2015–16
6	Rui Hachimura	729	2018–19
7	Dan Dickau	672	2001–02
8	Jim McPhee	662	1989–90
9	Bakari Hendrix	656	1997–98
10	Kyle Wiltjer	638	2014–15

Single game
Rk	Player	Points	Season	Opponent
1	Frank Burgess	52	1960–61	UC Davis
2	Jean-Claude Lefèbvre	50	1957–58	Whitworth
3	Kyle Wiltjer	45	2014–15	Pacific
4	Jerry Vermillion	44	1953–54	Whitman
	Frank Burgess	44	1960–61	Whitworth
	Adam Morrison	44	2005–06	Loyola Marymount
7	Adam Morrison	43	2005–06	Michigan State
	Adam Morrison	43	2005–06	Washington
9	Frank Burgess	42	1959–60	Seattle
	Jim McPhee	42	1989–90	Loyola Marymount
	Jim McPhee	42	1989–90	Loyola Marymount
	Adam Morrison	42	2005–06	Portland

== Three-pointers ==
Career
Rk	Player	3FG	Seasons
1	Kevin Pangos	322	2011–12 2012–13 2013–14 2014–15
2	Blake Stepp	288	2000–01 2001–02 2002–03 2003–04
3	Richie Frahm	280	1996–97 1997–98 1998–99 1999–2000
4	Corey Kispert	270	2017–18 2018–19 2019–20 2020–21
5	Matt Santangelo	252	1996–97 1997–98 1998–99 1999–2000
6	Josh Perkins	251	2015–16 2016–17 2017–18 2018–19
7	Derek Raivio	243	2003–04 2004–05 2005–06 2006–07
8	John Rillie	230	1992–93 1993–94 1994–95
9	Nolan Hickman	225	2021–22 2022–23 2023–24 2024–25
10	Gary Bell Jr.	219	2011–12 2012–13 2013–14 2014–15

Season
Rk	Player	3FG	Season
1	Dan Dickau	117	2001–02
2	Blake Stepp	98	2002–03
3	Zach Norvell Jr.	97	2018–19
4	John Rillie	96	1994–95
5	Richie Frahm	93	1998–99
6	John Rillie	91	1993–94
6	Corey Kispert	91	2020–21
8	Richie Frahm	90	1999–2000
8	Kyle Wiltjer	90	2015–16
10	Derek Raivio	85	2006–07
10	Jordan Mathews	85	2016–17

Single game
Rk	Player	3FGM	3FGA	Season	Opponent
1	Dan Dickau	9	12	2001–02	Loyola Marymount
	Dan Dickau	9	13	2000–01	Santa Clara
	Kevin Pangos	9	13	2011–12	Washington State
	Corey Kispert	9	13	2020–21	Virginia
5	Richie Frahm	8	11	1998–99	Memphis
	Matt Santangelo	8	11	1998–99	Santa Clara
	Dan Dickau	8	11	2001–02	Portland
	John Rillie	8	12	1994–95	San Diego
	Julian Strawther	8	12	2022–23	Portland
	Adam Morrison	8	13	2005–06	Loyola Marymount
	Jarrod Davis	8	14	1990–91	Portland
	Richie Frahm	8	16	1999–2000	California
	Blake Stepp	8	17	2003–04	San Diego

== Rebounds ==
Career
Rk	Player	Rebounds	Seasons
1	Jerry Vermillion	1,670	1951–52 1952–53 1953–54 1954–55
2	Elias Harris	979	2009–10 2010–11 2011–12 2012–13
3	Gary Lechman	910	1964–65 1965–66 1966–67
4	Drew Timme	896	2019–20 2020–21 2021–22 2022–23
5	Cory Violette	880	2000–01 2001–02 2002–03 2003–04
6	Ronny Turiaf	859	2001–02 2002–03 2003–04 2004–05
7	Przemek Karnowski	819	2012–13 2013–14 2014–15 2015–16 2016–17
8	Greg Sten	783	1970–71 1971–72 1972–73
9	Anton Watson	780	2019–20 2020–21 2021–22 2022–23 2023–24
10	Graham Ike	762	2023–24 2024–25 2025–26

Season
Rk	Player	Rebounds	Season
1	Jerry Vermillion	456	1952–53
2	Jerry Vermillion	440	1954–55
3	Domantas Sabonis	426	2015–16
4	Jerry Vermillion	402	1953–54
5	Jerry Vermillion	372	1951–52
6	Charlie Jordan	367	1959–60
7	Gary Lechman	354	1966–67
8	Jim Dixon	353	1962–63
9	Joe Clayton	339	1971–72
10	Paul Cathey	333	1977–78

Single game
Rk	Player	Rebounds	Season	Opponent
1	Jim Dixon	33	1960–61	Eastern Washington
2	Paul Cathey	28	1977–78	UNLV

== Assists ==
Career
Rk	Player	Assists	Seasons
1	Josh Perkins	712	2015–16 2016–17 2017–18 2018–19
2	Matt Santangelo	668	1996–97 1997–98 1998–99 1999–2000
3	Blake Stepp	640	2000–01 2001–02 2002–03 2003–04
4	Jeremy Pargo	589	2005–06 2006–07 2007–08 2008–09
5	Ryan Nembhard	587	2023–24 2024–25
6	John Stockton	554	1980–81 1981–82 1982–83 1983–84
7	Kevin Pangos	536	2011–12 2012–13 2013–14 2014–15
8	Matt Bouldin	444	2006–07 2007–08 2008–09 2009–10
9	David Stockton	423	2010–11 2011–12 2012–13 2013–14
10	Derek Raivio	356	2003–04 2004–05 2005–06 2006–07

Season
Rk	Player	Assists	Season
1	Ryan Nembhard	344	2024–25
2	Ryan Nembhard	243	2023–24
3	Josh Perkins	234	2018–19
4	Matt Santangelo	225	1999–2000
5	Blake Stepp	207	2003–04
6	John Stockton	201	1983–84
7	Jeremy Pargo	199	2007–08
8	Blake Stepp	198	2002–03
9	Josh Perkins	196	2017–18
10	John Stockton	184	1982–83
10	Matt Santangelo	184	1998–99
10	Andrew Nembhard	184	2021–22

Single game
Rk	Player	Assists	Season	Opponent
1	Blake Stepp	16	2002–03	Long Beach State
1	Ryan Nembhard	16	2024–25	San Francisco
3	Ryan Nembhard	15	2024–25	Santa Clara
3	Ryan Nembhard	15	2024–25	Santa Clara
5	Joël Ayayi	14	2020–21	Portland
5	Andrew Nembhard	14	2021–22	Pepperdine
5	Ryan Nembhard	14	2024–25	Davidson
5	Ryan Nembhard	14	2024–25	Portland

== Steals ==
Career
Rk	Player	Steals	Seasons
1	John Stockton	262	1980–81 1981–82 1982–83 1983–84
2	Anton Watson	215	2019–20 2020–21 2021–22 2022–23 2023–24
3	Josh Perkins	178	2015–16 2016–17 2017–18 2018–19
4	Kevin Pangos	177	2011–12 2012–13 2013–14 2014–15
5	Matt Bouldin	170	2006–07 2007–08 2008–09 2009–10
5	Jeremy Pargo	170	2005–06 2006–07 2007–08 2008–09
7	David Stockton	167	2010–11 2011–12 2012–13 2013–14
8	Doug Spradley	159	1985–86 1986–87 1987–88 1988–89
9	Derek Raivio	158	2003–04 2004–05 2005–06 2006–07
10	Steven Gray	155	2007–08 2008–09 2009–10 2010–11

Season
Rk	Player	Steals	Season
1	John Stockton	109	1983–84
2	John Stockton	68	1981–82
2	John Stockton	68	1982–83
4	Anton Watson	66	2022–23
5	Nigel Williams-Goss	64	2016–17
6	Quentin Hall	62	1998–99
7	Ryan Nembhard	60	2024–25
8	Steven Gray	57	2010–11
8	Jalen Suggs	57	2020–21
10	David Stockton	55	2013–14

== Blocks ==
Career
Rk	Player	Blocks	Seasons
1	Casey Calvary	207	1997–98 1998–99 1999–2000 2000–01
2	Robert Sacre	186	2007–08 2008–09 2009–10 2010–11 2011–12
3	Ronny Turiaf	179	2001–02 2002–03 2003–04 2004–05
4	Przemek Karnowski	152	2012–13 2013–14 2014–15 2015–16 2016–17
5	Austin Daye	124	2007–08 2008–09
6	Brandon Clarke	117	2018–19
	Chet Holmgren	117	2021–22
8	Drew Timme	115	2019–20 2020–21 2021–22 2022–23
9	Tim Ruff	99	1981–82 1982–83 1983–84 1984–85
10	Josh Heytvelt	95	2005–06 2006–07 2007–08 2008–09

Season
Rk	Player	Blocks	Season
1	Brandon Clarke	117	2018–19
	Chet Holmgren	117	2021–22
3	Austin Daye	70	2008–09
4	Zach Collins	69	2016–17
5	Robert Sacre	66	2010–11
6	Robert Sacre	65	2009–10
7	Przemek Karnowski	62	2013–14
8	Ronny Turiaf	59	2004–05
9	Casey Calvary	57	1998–99
	Casey Calvary	57	1999–2000

Single game
Rk	Player	Blocks	Season	Opponent
1	Przemek Karnowski	7	2013–14	Saint Mary's
	Chet Holmgren	7	2021–22	Dixie State
