= Bakari Hendrix =

American basketball player (born 1977)

Personal information
- Born: May 23, 1977 (age 49) Portland, Oregon, U.S.
- Listed height: 6 ft 8 in (2.03 m)
- Listed weight: 230 lb (104 kg)

Career information
- High school: St. Patrick-St. Vincent (Vallejo, California)
- College: Solano CC (1994–1995); Gonzaga (1995–1998)
- NBA draft: 1998: undrafted
- Playing career: 1998–2008
- Position: Power forward
- Number: 5, 32

Career history
- 1998–2000: Quad City Thunder
- 2000: Iraklio
- 2000–2001: Besançon BCD
- 2001–2002: Aurora Basket Jesi
- 2002–2003: Huntsville Flight
- 2004–2005: Seoul Samsung Thunders
- 2005: Yakima Sun Kings
- 2005: Coca-Cola Tigers
- 2005–2006: Benfica
- 2006–2007: Colorado 14ers
- 2007: Wellington Saints
- 2007–2008: South Dragons
- 2008: Tebnin

Career highlights
- CBA Rookie of the Year (1999); CBA All-Rookie Team (1999); WCC Player of the Year (1998); 2× First-team All-WCC (1997, 1998)

Bakari Akil Hendrix (born May 23, 1977) is a retired American basketball player. He was a standout player at Gonzaga University and played professionally in eleven countries.

Hendrix, a 6'8" power forward from St. Patrick-St. Vincent High School in Vallejo, California, played collegiate basketball at Solano Community College (1994 to 1995) and Gonzaga (1995 to 1998). At Gonzaga, Hendrix faced a tough start as he fractured his ankle in his sophomore year - limiting his season to just nine games. However, the next two years Hendrix was named first team All-West Coast Conference as a junior and senior and was the 1998 WCC Player of the Year after averaging 19.8 points and 7.3 rebounds per game.

Following the close of his college career, Hendrix was not drafted by the National Basketball Association (NBA). Hendrix instead went to Turkey to play for Türk Telekom B.K. This began a basketball odyssey for Hendrix that led him to play for 14 teams in eleven counties from 1998 to 2009. Hendix played professionally in Greece, France, Italy, South Korea, the Philippines, New Zealand, Australia and Lebanon. Hendrix also had stints in the United States with the Quad City Thunder of the Continental Basketball Association (where he was named the league's rookie of the year in 1999) and with the Huntsville Flight and Colorado 14ers of the NBA Development League (NBDL).

Hendrix played the 2007 season for the Wellington Saints in New Zealand. During that time, he had a well-reported brawl with Casey Frank of the Auckland Stars after one of the games. When Hendrix left New Zealand, he left one pair of his size 18 sports shoes behind along with the instruction to "find a kid that needs some shoes". A year later, the shoes were handed to a shy 14-year-old who had moved to Wellington to study at Scots College, but who could not find shoes large enough to train for basketball; Steven Adams would later become a top international prospect for the NBA.
