= Isiah Harwell =

American basketball player (born 2007)

No. 1 – Gonzaga Bulldogs
- Position: Shooting guard
- Conference: Pac-12 Conference

Personal information
- Born: January 2, 2007 (age 19) Pocatello, Idaho, U.S.
- Listed height: 6 ft 6 in (1.98 m)
- Listed weight: 220 lb (100 kg)

Career information
- High school: Century (Pocatello, Idaho); Wasatch Academy (Mount Pleasant, Utah)
- College: Houston (2025–2026); Gonzaga (2026–present)

Career highlights
- McDonald's All-American (2025)
Medals
Men's basketball
Representing United States
FIBA Under-16 Americas Championship
| Gold medal – first place | 2023 Mexico | Team |

Isiah James Harwell (born January 2, 2007) is an American college basketball player for the Gonzaga Bulldogs of the Pac-12 Conference. He previously played for the Houston Cougars.

== Early life and high school ==
Harwell grew up in Pocatello, Idaho and initially attended Century High School. As a 5-star freshman, he averaged 18 points and eight rebounds per game. He helped his team reach the 4A District 5 Finals Harwell transferred to Wasatch Academy in Mount Pleasant, Utah prior to his sophomore year. He averaged 14.9 points and 4.7 rebounds per game during his junior season.

Harwell is a consensus five-star recruit and one of the top players in the 2025 class, according to major recruiting services. He committed to play college basketball at Houston over offers from Gonzaga, Texas, and California.

== College career ==
Harwell enrolled at the University of Houston in June 2025 in order to take part in the Cougars' summer practices. He averaged 3.6 points and 2.0 rebounds per game. Following the season Harwell entered the 2026 NBA draft and the transfer portal, ultimately transferring to Gonzaga.

== National team career ==
Harwell played for the United States national under-16 team at the 2023 FIBA Under-16 Americas Championship. He averaged 4.8 points, 3.3 rebounds, and 1.7 assists over six games as the United States won the gold medal.

== Career statistics ==
Legend
| GP | Games played | GS | Games started | MPG | Minutes per game |
| FG% | Field goal percentage | 3P% | 3-point field goal percentage | FT% | Free throw percentage |
| RPG | Rebounds per game | APG | Assists per game | SPG | Steals per game |
| BPG | Blocks per game | PPG | Points per game | **Bold** | Career high |

=== College ===
| Year | Team | GP | GS | MPG | FG% | 3P% | FT% | RPG | APG | SPG | BPG | PPG |
|---|---|---|---|---|---|---|---|---|---|---|---|---|
| 2025–26 | Houston | 32 | 0 | 13.8 | .279 | .271 | .613 | 2.0 | .5 | .6 | .3 | 3.6 |

== Personal life ==
Harwell's father, Ron Harwell, played college basketball at Idaho State. His older brother, Malek, played at Boise State and Cal Poly.
