= Jeff Brown (basketball) =

American basketball player

Personal information
- Born: November 13, 1970 (age 56)
- Listed height: 6 ft 9 in (2.06 m)

Career information
- High school: Mead (Spokane, Washington)
- College: Washington (1989–1990); Gonzaga (1991–1994)
- NBA draft: 1994: undrafted
- Position: Power forward

Career history
- 1997: Adelaide 36ers

Career highlights
- WCC Player of the Year (1994); 3× First-team All-WCC (1992–1994); Academic All-America of the Year (1994)

Jeffrey Allan Brown (born November 13, 1970) is an American former professional basketball player. He was West Coast Conference Player of the Year as a senior at Gonzaga University and played four years of professional basketball, including a season in Australia's National Basketball League.

Brown, a 6'9 forward, came to Gonzaga from nearby Mead Senior High School in Spokane, Washington. He played for the Zags from 1991 to 1994 and was a three-time first team All-West Coast Conference (WCC) pick and the 1994 conference player of the year. Nationally, Brown was twice named a first team Academic All-American and was selected as the GTE men's basketball Academic All-America Team Member of the Year in 1994. For his career, Brown scored 1,646 points.

Following his college career, Brown played basketball professionally in Spain, Argentina, Belgium and Australia (Adelaide 36ers). In 1998, Brown left basketball for a career in the IT industry. He was inducted into the WCC Hall of Honor in 2010.
