= Gonzaga Bulldogs men's basketball =

Intercollegiate team

2026–27 Gonzaga Bulldogs men's basketball team
- University: Gonzaga University
- First season: 1907–08
- Head coach: Mark Few (28th season)
- Location: Spokane, Washington
- Arena: McCarthey Athletic Center (capacity: 6,000)
- Conference: Pac-12
- Nickname: Bulldogs (official); Zags (unofficial)
- Colors: Navy blue, white, and red
- Student section: Kennel Club
- All-time record: 1,426–713 (.667)
- NCAA tournament record: 48–28 (.632)

NCAA Division I tournament runner-up
- 2017, 2021
Other NCAA Division I tournament results
Final Four	2017, 2021
Elite Eight	1999, 2015, 2017, 2019, 2021, 2023
Sweet Sixteen	1999, 2000, 2001, 2006, 2009, 2015, 2016, 2017, 2018, 2019, 2021, 2022, 2023, 2024
Appearances	1995, 1999, 2000, 2001, 2002, 2003, 2004, 2005, 2006, 2007, 2008, 2009, 2010, 2011, 2012, 2013, 2014, 2015, 2016, 2017, 2018, 2019, 2021, 2022, 2023, 2024, 2025, 2026

Conference tournament champions
- 1995, 1999, 2000, 2001, 2002, 2004, 2005, 2006, 2007, 2009, 2011, 2013, 2014, 2015, 2016, 2017, 2018, 2020, 2021, 2022, 2023, 2025, 2026

Conference regular-season champions
- 1966, 1967, 1994, 1996, 1998, 1999, 2001, 2002, 2003, 2004, 2005, 2006, 2007, 2008, 2009, 2010, 2011, 2013, 2014, 2015, 2016, 2017, 2018, 2019, 2020, 2021, 2022, 2023, 2026

Uniforms
Home	Away
Alternate	Alternate

The Gonzaga Bulldogs are an intercollegiate men's basketball program representing Gonzaga University. The school competes in the Pac-12 Conference in Division I of the National Collegiate Athletic Association (NCAA). The Gonzaga Bulldogs play home basketball games at McCarthey Athletic Center in Spokane, Washington, on the university campus.

Gonzaga has had 15 of its players receive the WCC Player of the Year award, and two players, Frank Burgess in 1961 with 32.4 points per game, and Adam Morrison in 2006 with 28.1 points per game, have led the nation in scoring. Morrison was named the Co-National Player of the year for the 2005–06 season.

Since the mid-1990s, Gonzaga has established itself as a major basketball power in a mid-major conference. (Note: For example, in January 2022, ESPN defined mid-majors as "programs outside the top 7 conferences (Power Five, Big East, AAC) and Gonzaga" (emphasis added).) They have been to every NCAA tournament held since 1999, a year in which they made a Cinderella run to the Elite Eight, and have appeared in every final AP poll since the 2008–09 season. Gonzaga had an active weekly poll streak of 143 weeks, starting from the 2016–17 season and ending on January 15, 2024, being tied for the tenth longest streak in Division I history. They have also appeared in all but one WCC conference title game since 1995, and in every conference title game since 1998, winning 21 of them.

The 2016–17 Bulldogs went to the program's first-ever Final Four, advancing to the 2017 national championship game, where they lost to North Carolina. They returned to the Final Four in 2021, losing in the national championship game to Baylor.

== Team history ==
=== Early years ===
Gonzaga introduced a varsity basketball program during the 1907–08 basketball season and, although the season was not an official one, they achieved a record of 9–2 (.818) under head coach George M. Varnell. They played some organized basketball even earlier.In the 1908–09 season, Varnell became the first official coach for Gonzaga, earning a 10–2 (.833) record. William Mulligan coached the following season and acquired an 11–3 (.786) record. Frank McKevitt took over for Mulligan during the 1910–11 basketball season, acquiring an 8–1 (.889) record. From 1944 to 1994, the Bulldogs compiled a record of 628–531 (.542), earning regular season titles in 1965–66 and 1966–67 (Big Sky) under Hank Anderson, and in 1993–94 (WCC) under Dan Fitzgerald. That season also saw the team qualify for its first postseason tournament, the National Invitation Tournament (NIT), while being led by forward Jeff Brown, who was the WCC Player of the Year, and point guard Geoff Goss, who was made the All-WCC First Team that season. In the following season, the fourth-seeded Bulldogs won the WCC tournament to secure their first appearance in the NCAA tournament.

=== Dan Monson (1997–1999) ===
In 1997, Gonzaga assistant coach Dan Monson, the son of veteran Oregon and Idaho head coach Don Monson, became the head coach of Gonzaga as Fitzgerald wanted to focus on his athletic director's duties. During his first season, Monson led the Zags to a 24–10 record and a WCC regular season title, which was not enough to land an at-large bid in the NCAA tournament. They earned a bid into the NIT and beat Wyoming 69–55 in the first round in Laramie, but fell at Hawai'i 78–70 in the second round.

During the 1998–99 season, the Bulldogs had a 28–7 record after winning the conference tournament, and were seeded tenth in the West regional of the NCAA tournament. In the tournament's "Cinderella" run and Gonzaga's "coming out party" (Gonzaga has made the NCAA tournament each year since) the Zags beat seventh-seeded Minnesota 75–63 in the first round in Seattle and followed it with an 82–74 win over second-seeded Stanford to advance to the regional semifinals in Phoenix. Gonzaga beat Florida 73–72 to advance to the regional finals after Casey Calvary tipped in the winning basket with four seconds remaining. They trailed eventual national champion UConn by one point with a minute remaining before losing 67–62 in the regional finals.

=== Mark Few (1999–present) ===
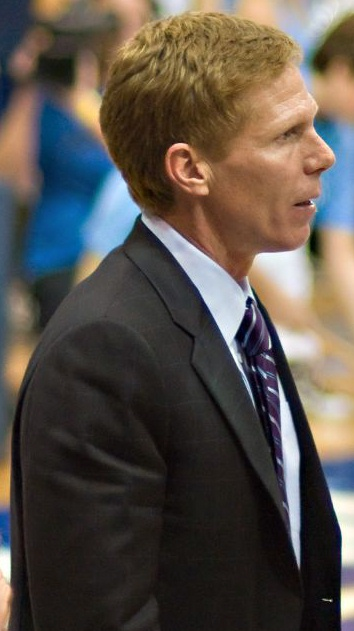
Mark Few during a game against San Diego on February 18, 2008

After Monson departed for Minnesota that summer, assistant coach Mark Few was promoted to head coach on July 26, 1999.

In his inaugural season, Few led the Zags to a 26–9 record, which was highlighted by winning the WCC tournament and advancing to the Sweet 16 of the NCAA tournament with wins over Louisville and St. John's in Tucson, Arizona.

In the 2000–01 season, the Bulldogs faced a tough schedule highlighted by games against Arizona, Washington, Florida, and New Mexico. Despite starting the season 5–1, the Zags dropped four of their next five games. Gonzaga rebounded and finished the regular season 15–6 before winning their third consecutive WCC tournament title. The win gave the Bulldogs an automatic bid into the NCAA tournament, where they were seeded twelfth in the South regional. In the first round in Memphis against fifth-seeded Virginia, Casey Calvary put back a blocked shot with nine seconds left to give the Zags an 86–85 victory. Gonzaga then beat 13th-seeded Indiana State 85–68 in the second round to advance to their third consecutive Sweet 16. In Atlanta, the Zags lost to defending national champion Michigan State 77–62 and finished the season with a 26–7 record.

Prior to the 2001–02 season, the Bulldogs were unanimously favored to win the WCC title in the WCC preseason coaches poll. Few led the Zags to a share of the WCC regular season title, as Pepperdine also had a 13–1 conference record. The Bulldogs would avenge their only conference loss of the season by defeating Pepperdine 96–90 for their fourth straight WCC tournament title. The win gave the Zags an automatic bid as a six-seed in the NCAA tournament, opening against 11th-seeded Wyoming. Despite beating the Cowboys four years earlier in the NIT, they lost 73–66, marking the first time the Zags lost in the first round of the tournament under Mark Few.

In the 2002–03 season, Few led the Bulldogs to their fifth regular season title in six years with a 12–2 conference record. Despite this, Gonzaga lost to San Diego in the WCC tournament championship game 72–63, marking the first time the Zags had lost in the championship game in four years. Gonzaga garnered a nine-seed in the 2003 NCAA tournament, where they beat Cincinnati 74–69 to advance to the second round of the tournament for the fourth time in five years. The Bulldogs would go on to lose to Arizona 96–95 in double overtime to finish 24–9.

The 2003–04 season marked the first time that the team participated in the annual Battle in Seattle game. Gonzaga faced third-ranked Missouri, who was the highest-ranked regular season opponent that the Zags had played against up to that point; they would go on to win the game in an 87–80 overtime victory. This season marked the last time Gonzaga would play home games in the Charlotte Y. Martin Centre; their last game in the building took place February 28, 2004, where they beat Santa Clara 80–64. The win gave the Bulldogs their first undefeated run through the WCC in school history with a 14–0 conference record. Gonzaga would go on to receive an automatic bid into the 2004 NCAA tournament with a two-seed, which was the highest seed they had received in school history in seven tournament appearances. The Bulldogs would go on to beat 15th-seeded Valparaiso 76–49 before being upset in the second round by tenth-seeded Nevada 91–72, where they finished the season 28–3.

Gonzaga opened up the 2004–05 season with a home game against Portland State in the new 6,000-seat McCarthey Athletic Center on November 19, 2004. Despite losing five seniors, including second-round NBA draft pick Blake Stepp, Few was still able to lead the Zags to their ninth regular season title since 1994 with a 12–2 conference record. The Bulldogs would go on to win their second straight WCC Tournament title, giving them an automatic bid into the 2005 NCAA tournament as a three-seed. The Zags beat 14th-seeded Winthrop 74–64 before falling to Texas Tech 71–69 in the second round, where they ended the season with a 26–5 record.

Before the 2005–06 season got underway, Gonzaga junior Adam Morrison became the first player in team history to be named to the preseason Associated Press All-America team. The Zags also received their highest preseason ranking in program history at number seven in the USA Today/ESPN preseason poll. The Bulldogs captured their third straight WCC Tournament title when they beat Loyola Marymount 68–67 in the championship game. They received an automatic bid into the 2006 NCAA tournament as a three-seed, where they beat Xavier 79–75 in the first round. The Zags would go on to beat Indiana Hoosiers 90–80, where they would advance to the Sweet 16 for the first time since 2001. Despite being ahead by as many as 17 points, the Bulldogs ended their season in the Sweet 16 by losing to UCLA 73–71, finishing 29–4.

The 2006–07 season marked the first time that the Zags suffered at least ten losses in a season since the 1997–98 season. Despite this, Few still led the Bulldogs to their seventh straight regular season title with a conference record of 11–3. Gonzaga would go on to win the WCC Tournament for the fourth year in a row, being the only Division I school to do so that year. They received an automatic bid into the 2007 NCAA tournament, where they were given a 10-seed. The Zags would end their season by losing in the opening round for the first time since 2001, as Indiana beat Gonzaga 70–57.

In 2007–08 the Bulldogs went 25–8, but lost in the Round of 64 as a #7 seed to a Davidson team that went to the Elite Eight as a #10 seed.

The 2008–09 team won both the WCC Regular Season Championship and the WCC Tournament Championship. Entering the NCAA tournament as a #4 seed, the team reached the Sweet Sixteen, before losing to eventual NCAA Champions North Carolina.

For the next five seasons, the team advanced to the NCAA tournament, but fell in the Round of 32 each time. The 2012–13 team became the first Gonzaga squad to be ranked as the #1 team in the country and was awarded as a #1 seed in the NCAA tournament for the first time. The Zags also won over 30 games for the first time in program history with a 32–3 overall record.

The 2014–15 team advanced all the way to the Elite Eight before losing to eventual national champion Duke. This was the first time since 1999 that Gonzaga had advanced to the Elite Eight. Gonzaga also won the WCC regular-season and tournament championships for the third consecutive season. The 2014–15 also set the school record for wins in a single season with 35.

The 2015–16 team suffered 4 losses at home and nearly missed the NCAA tournament entirely, but shared the WCC regular-season crown with Saint Mary's and then won the WCC Tournament. The Zags were awarded a #11 seed and advanced to the Sweet Sixteen, dismantling #6 seed Seton Hall and #3 seed Utah, before falling to Syracuse by three points.

The 2016–17 team won its first 29 games, setting a new school record for consecutive games won, before falling to WCC rival BYU. The Zags made the NCAA tournament as a #1 seed and advanced to the school's first-ever championship game, with wins over South Dakota State, Northwestern, West Virginia, Xavier, and South Carolina. The Zags set a new school record for wins in a single season with 37 and also had the most wins of any team that season.

The 2017–18 team also enjoyed success. Despite what was considered a "rebuilding year" after the Loss of Karnowski, Williams-Goss, Mathews and Collins among others (causing the Bulldogs to not be picked to win the West Coast Conference), the team won the WCC regular season title outright before winning the WCC tournament. In the NCAA tournament, the Bulldogs advanced to the Sweet Sixteen for the fourth consecutive year. They were ultimately bounced by Florida State, and finished the season at 32–5.

Near the end of that season, Gonzaga considered a potential move to the Mountain West Conference (MW) after nearly 40 years as a WCC member. When asked by a reporter from the San Diego Union-Tribune about rumored MW expansion plans, MW commissioner Craig Thompson confirmed that six schools had been considered, with Gonzaga being the only school he specifically named. A later Union-Tribune report indicated that talks were advanced enough that the conference's presidents planned a vote on an invitation to Gonzaga during the MW men's and women's basketball tournaments in Las Vegas, but decided to delay the vote until after the Final Four. The vote ultimately never took place, as Gonzaga athletic director Mike Roth notified both conferences during the Final Four that the school would remain in the WCC for the immediate future. In the 2018 Maui Invitational Final on November 21, 2018 #3 Gonzaga defeated #1 Duke 89–87 for their first win over Duke and first win over a number 1 ranked team in team history.

The 2020–21 season would be a historic year for the team, going 26–0 in the regular season and being the final undefeated team in the country. They would earn the #1 overall seed in the tournament and cruise to the national championship game over Norfolk State, Oklahoma, Creighton, USC, and UCLA. In the national championship, their undefeated season came to an end, losing to Baylor 86–70.

The 2022–2023 team, finished the season with an impressive 31–6 overall record and a 14–2 record in West Coast Conference (WCC). Their season was highlighted by a run to the Elite Eight of the NCAA Tournament, the program's sixth appearance in the regional final since 1999. However they would come up short to the eventual national champion UConn 82–54.

In 2024, Gonzaga University accepted an invitation to join the Pac-12 Conference on July 1, 2026, for all sports including Men's basketball.

== Facilities ==
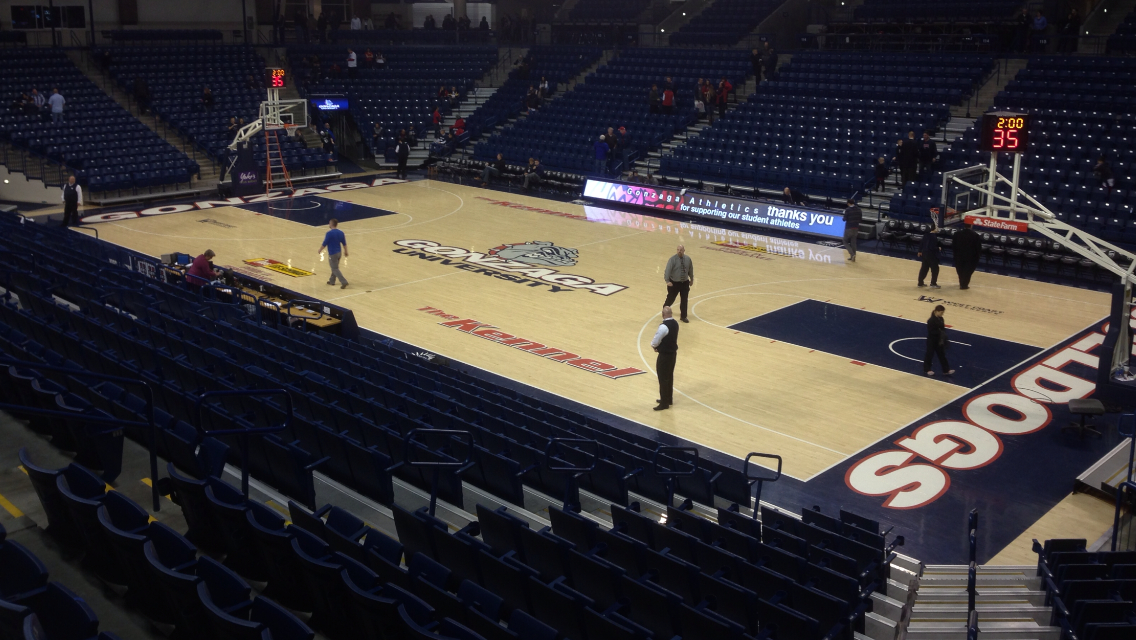
The McCarthey Athletic Center has been home to Gonzaga's basketball teams since 2004.

Basketball started at Gonzaga in February 1905 after a gymnasium was put in as an addition to the east end of the new college building that was being built. In 1955, the basketball team moved from the gymnasium, nicknamed "the cave", and began to play at the newly constructed Spokane Coliseum. On June 3, 1964, construction began for a new 3,800-seat athletic facility called the John F. Kennedy Memorial Pavilion. To raise money for the $1.1 million project, Gonzaga's student body had each student pay $10 per semester until $500,000 was raised. The university matched that amount, while the remaining $100,000 came from contributions. Gonzaga's first game in the pavilion took place on December 3, 1965, against Washington State, who beat the Bulldogs 106–78. In 1986, the facility was renamed the Charlotte Y. Martin Centre after an eponymous donor donated $4.5 million to finance a remodel of the arena that could hold up to 4,000 people.

After competing for over 39 years in the Charlotte Y. Martin Centre, Gonzaga trustees approved construction for a new 6,000-seat arena on April 11, 2003. The McCarthey Athletic Center was named after Gonzaga trustee Philip G. McCarthey and Gonzaga regent Thomas K. McCarthey, who contributed a significant portion of the funds needed to build the arena. The first official game took place on November 19, 2004, against Portland State, whom the Zags would beat 98–80 in front of a sold-out crowd. The Bulldogs opened the arena with a 38-game winning streak, which was the nation's longest active winning streak at the time. When combined with 12 wins at the Charlotte Y. Martin Centre, the overall home-game winning streak ended at 50 games with a loss to the Santa Clara on February 12, 2007. In February 2015, BYU snapped Gonzaga's 41-game home winning streak in the McCarthey Athletic Center, which was also the longest active home winning streak in the NCAA at the time.

Through February 6, 2020, the Zags are 223–15 (.937) in the McCarthey Athletic Center, which includes a 105–8 (.929) record in non-conference games, a 116–7 (.943) record in conference games, and a 2–0 (1.000) record in the WCC Tournament.

== Traditions ==
=== Battle in Seattle ===
Battle in Seattle Results
Year	Opponent	Result	Score	Attendance
2003	#3 Missouri	Won	87–80 (OT)	12,831
2004	Massachusetts	Won	68–57	10,126
2005	Oklahoma State	Won	64–62	13,644
2006	#24 Nevada	Lost	74–82	15,110
2007	#11 Tennessee	Lost	72–82	15,141
2008	#2 Connecticut	Lost	83–88 (OT)	16,763
2009	Davidson	Won	103–91	13,176
2010	#20 Illinois	Lost	61–73	14,789
2011	Arizona	Won	71–60	15,127
2012	Kansas State	Won	68–52	16,241
2013	South Alabama	Won	68–59	9,140
2014	Cal Poly	Won	63–50	11,741
2015	Tennessee	Won	86–79	16,770
2021	Alabama	Lost	82–91	18,048
2024	#4 Kentucky	Lost	89–90 (OT)	17,846

On December 13, 2003, Gonzaga participated in a neutral court game at KeyArena that would later become an annual event known as the Battle in Seattle. The event marked the first time that a regular season Gonzaga basketball game was broadcast nationally on CBS Sports, as Craig Bolerjack called the action while Clark Kellogg provided commentary. Ranked third in the country, Missouri was the highest ranked regular season opponent that Gonzaga had faced up to that point; the Bulldogs would go on to beat the Tigers 87–80 in overtime.

The 2005 Battle in Seattle is remembered for Adam Morrison's game-winning shot against Oklahoma State that sealed a 64–62 victory for the Bulldogs. Gus Johnson's call at the end of the game with Bill Raftery was ranked fourth on a list of 25 of his most "over-the-top calls" by Complex. Johnson's call at the end of the game:

Zags no timeouts. They gotta hurry. But here comes the All-America. Morrison... six... fires... OH... HE BANKED IN A THREE! [Raftery shouts "OH!"] OH... WOW... [Raftery: ONIONS!] WHAT A GAME... [Raftery shouts "OH!" again] LARRY BIRD... BABY... [Raftery makes an unintelligible sound...] WHOA! [Raftery laughs in the background... Replay is shown as Raftery says, "Look at the clock. And when you're sleepless in Seattle, why not get a little kiss... Gus... Oh! Major onions... all on his own! Look at the contesting... oh, what a smooch... woo... wow!"] Crunch time you go to your best player. [Raftery says, "This kid is extraordinary... and watch the contesting Gus, it's not like he's standing still. Two defenders, knowing... look at that.] Adam Morrison refusing to let his team lose.

In 2008, the game broke the state attendance record for a regular season college basketball game, as a sold-out crowd of 16,763 watched the Bulldogs play Connecticut.

In the 2016–17 season, Gonzaga failed to schedule the Battle in Seattle, ending an annual tradition of participating in the event every December for 13 consecutive years. Representatives from the Zags cited an inability to find a quality opponent to schedule and wanting to maintain strong résumé. The Zags have compiled an 9–6 (.600) record in the event since they first appeared in it back in 2003.

In 2023, #10 Gonzaga was defeated 76-63 by the #5 UConn Huskies, two-time defending national champions, in the Continental Tire Seattle Tip-Off, a non-Battle in Seattle event. Attendance at Climate Pledge Arena was 16,405.

== Rivalries ==
=== Brigham Young University (BYU) ===
A notable rivalry with Brigham Young University (BYU) has developed throughout the past decade. BYU and Gonzaga first played on December 16, 1949, with Gonzaga winning 46–41. The two teams would not meet again until March 19, 2011, in the third round of the NCAA tournament, as a BYU team led by Jimmer Fredette advanced to the Sweet Sixteen by defeating the Zags 89–67. The following season, BYU left the Mountain West Conference and joined the West Coast Conference for the 2011–2012 season. BYU is one of few teams to win multiple times at the McCarthy Athletic Center in Spokane over the last decade, with wins at the Kennel in 2015, 2016 and 2017. BYU was the only team to beat #1 ranked Gonzaga during the 2016–17 regular season in which Gonzaga earned its first trip to the Final Four and National Championship game. BYU has played Gonzaga in the West Coast Conference tournament Final in 2014, 2015, 2018, and 2021 with Gonzaga winning all four of these matchups. Gonzaga leads the overall series 25–7, with the most recent meeting on February 11, 2023, in which Gonzaga won 88–81 in Spokane. BYU departed the WCC for the Big 12 Conference, starting with the 2023–2024 season, and since then, no matchups have been confirmed for the future between the Cougars and Zags.

=== Saint Mary's College (California) ===
Gonzaga's biggest rivalry is with fellow West Coast Conference foe Saint Mary's. Many analysts and members of the media have touted the Gaels vs. Zags as one of the best, if not the best, college basketball rivalry on the West Coast, as both teams have been consistently the two top teams in the conference over the last 2 decades. Since 2001, the rivalry has involved 2 of the school's greatest coaches in Mark Few and Randy Bennett. Gonzaga and Saint Mary's have combined to win 24 out of the last 26 conference championship games (Gonzaga 20, Saint Mary's 4, San Diego 2). The schools have faced off in the WCC Championship 15 times with Gonzaga holding the 11–4 edge. On October 1, 2024, Gonzaga accepted an invitation to join the Pac-12 Conference, effective July 1, 2026.

As of 2026, Gonzaga leads the all-time series 83–38.

=== Washington ===
Another one of Gonzaga's in-state rivals is Washington. They played a 10-year home-and-home series from 1997 to 2006, but then it went dormant until they were forced to play each other in first round of the 2015 Battle 4 Atlantis tournament. In 2016, they began a new home-and-home series in Spokane and have agreed to continue the rivalry annually until at least the 2025–26 season. The Huskies lead the series 30–20. Although the Zags have won 14 of the last 16 matchups, the most recent game was won by Washington on December 9, 2023, 78–73.

=== Washington State ===
Gonzaga's most heated in-state rivalry is with Washington State. The two schools are both based in Eastern Washington, with Pullman only 79 miles away from Spokane. Following the collapse of the Pac-12 and Wazzu's temporary move to the WCC for some sports including basketball, the rivalry became renewed in the 2024–25 season. In October 2024, Gonzaga announced that they had joined the new Pac-12, solidifying the return of the rivalry. The Cougars lead the series 98–54, but Gonzaga has won 15 of the last 18 matchups, including the two WCC Conference games in the 2024–25 season.

== Impact ==
=== University enrollment ===
Freshman enrollment at Gonzaga in the mid-nineties hovered around 500 students annually, including a total of 569 as late as 1998. In 1999, enrollment jumped to 701 five months after the Zags went to the Elite Eight. This trend continued after Gonzaga won five games in the 1999 and 2000 NCAA tournaments, as freshman enrollment increased to 796 in 2000 and to a then-record 979 in 2001. A 65 percent increase in the size of the freshman class between 1997 and 2003 is part of a phenomenon called the Flutie effect, the increase in attention and applications for admission that results after a particularly notable and unexpected sporting victory by a school's athletic team. Gonzaga University president Rev. Robert Spitzer said that the team's success was responsible for the school receiving the $23 million required to build the McCarthey Athletic Center, most of which was received through major gifts.

Gonzaga has been viewed as reaping benefits from its basketball-related exposure to this day. The university's financial position and fundraising success dramatically improved. This led to a campus building boom; the McCarthey Athletic Center proved to be just the first of a series of major campus buildings that opened between 2004 and 2017. Booming freshman enrollment led Gonzaga to introduce a more selective admissions process in 2003, which led to a significant increase in the academic credentials of incoming freshmen. Even with greater selectivity, freshman enrollment has continued to grow, reaching 1,200 for 2016–17.

== Season-by-season results ==
Under Mark Few:

Record table
Season	Team	Overall	Conference	Standing	Postseason
Mark Few (West Coast Conference) (1999–2026)
1999–00	Mark Few	26–9	11–3	2nd	NCAA Division I Sweet Sixteen
2000–01	Mark Few	26–7	13–1	1st	NCAA Division I Sweet Sixteen
2001–02	Mark Few	29–4	13–1	T–1st	NCAA Division I first round
2002–03	Mark Few	24–9	12–2	1st	NCAA Division I second round
2003–04	Mark Few	28–3	14–0	1st	NCAA Division I second round
2004–05	Mark Few	26–5	12–2	1st	NCAA Division I second round
2005–06	Mark Few	29–4	14–0	1st	NCAA Division I Sweet Sixteen
2006–07	Mark Few	23–11	11–3	1st	NCAA Division I first round
2007–08	Mark Few	25–8	13–1	1st	NCAA Division I first round
2008–09	Mark Few	28–6	14–0	1st	NCAA Division I Sweet Sixteen
2009–10	Mark Few	27–7	12–2	1st	NCAA Division I second round
2010–11	Mark Few	25–10	11–3	T–1st	NCAA Division I second round
2011–12	Mark Few	26–7	13–3	2nd	NCAA Division I second round
2012–13	Mark Few	32–3	16–0	1st	NCAA Division I second round
2013–14	Mark Few	29–7	15–3	1st	NCAA Division I second round
2014–15	Mark Few	35–3	17–1	1st	NCAA Division I Elite Eight
2015–16	Mark Few	28–8	15–3	T–1st	NCAA Division I Sweet Sixteen
2016–17	Mark Few	37–2	17–1	1st	NCAA Division I Runner-up
2017–18	Mark Few	32–5	17–1	1st	NCAA Division I Sweet Sixteen
2018–19	Mark Few	33–4	16–0	1st	NCAA Division I Elite Eight
2019–20	Mark Few	31–2	15–1	1st	No postseason held
2020–21	Mark Few	31–1	15–0	1st	NCAA Division I Runner-up
2021–22	Mark Few	28–4	13–1	1st	NCAA Division I Sweet Sixteen
2022–23	Mark Few	31–6	14–2	T–1st	NCAA Division I Elite Eight
2023–24	Mark Few	27–8	14–2	2nd	NCAA Division I Sweet Sixteen
2024–25	Mark Few	26–9	14–4	2nd	NCAA Division I second round
2025–26	Mark Few	31–4	16–2	T–1st	NCAA Division I second round
Mark Few (Pac-12 Conference) (2026–present)
2026–27	Mark Few	2–1			
Mark Few:		773–156 (.832)	377–42 (.900)		
Total:		1,893–1,157 (.621)			
National champion Postseason invitational champion Conference regular season champion Conference regular season and conference tournament champion Division regular season champion Division regular season and conference tournament champion Conference tournament champion

== Gonzaga vs. the AP Top 25 (since 1998–99) ==
Since the season of Gonzaga's 1999 NCAA Division I men's basketball tournament run to the Elite 8, Gonzaga has played a total of 139 games against teams ranked in the AP Top 25 Poll. Gonzaga has a record of 64–75 (.460) against such teams. They have beaten top-3 teams seven times in all, taking down #3 teams four times (Missouri in 2003–04, Georgia Tech and Oklahoma State in 2004–05, and Iowa in 2020–21), #2 twice (North Carolina in 2006–07 and UCLA in 2021–22), and #1 once (Duke in 2018–19).

Year	Opponent	Result
1998–99 (3–4)	#8 Kansas #15 Purdue #22 Washington #24 TCU **#7 Stanford** **#23 Florida** **#3 Connecticut**	L 80–66; L 83–68; **W** 82–71; L 90–87; **W** 82–74; **W** 73–72; L 67–62
1999–2000 (2–3)	#1 Cincinnati #19 Temple #11 UCLA **#9 St. John's** **#25 Purdue**	L 75–68; L 64–48; **W** 59–43; **W** 82–76; L 75–66
2000–01 (1–3)	#5 Arizona #8 Florida **#16 Virginia** **#3 Michigan State**	L 101–87; L 85–71; **W** 86–85; L 77–62
2001–02 (1–1)	#3 Illinois #21 Fresno State	L 76–58; **W** 87–77
2002–03 (0–3)	#19 Indiana #15 Kentucky **#2 Arizona**	L 76–75; L 80–72; L 96–95^{2OT}
2003–04 (1–2)	#17 St. Joseph's #3 Missouri #9 Stanford	L 73–66; **W** 87–80^{OT} L 87–80
2004–05 (3–2)	#5 Illinois #14 Washington #3 Georgia Tech #3 Oklahoma State **#24 Texas Tech**	L 89–72; **W** 99–87; **W** 85–73; **W** 78–75; L 71–69
2005–06 (2–4)	#23 Maryland #12 Michigan State #3 Connecticut #18 Washington #4 Memphis **#7 UCLA**	**W** 88–76; **W** 109–106^{3OT} L 65–63; L 99–95; L 83–72; L 73–71
2006–07 (3–3)	#2 North Carolina #13 Washington #6 Duke #24 Nevada #23 Stanford #8 Memphis	**W** 82–74; **W** 97–77; L 61–54; L 82–74; **W** 90–86^{2OT} L 78–77^{OT}
2007–08 (1–5)	#8 Washington State #11 Tennessee #1 Memphis #25 Saint Mary's #25 Saint Mary's **#23 Davidson**	L 51–47; L 82–72; L 81–73; L 89–85^{OT} **W** 88–76; L 82–76
2008–09 (3–3)	#12 Tennessee #2 Connecticut #15 Tennessee #22 Saint Mary's #14 Memphis **#2 North Carolina**	**W** 83–74; L 88–83^{OT} **W** 89–79^{OT} **W** 69–62; L 68–50; L 98–77
2009–10 (0–3)	#2 Michigan State #7 Duke **#4 Syracuse**	L 75–71; L 76–41; L 87–65
2010–11 (2–5)	#25 San Diego State #3 Kansas State #20 Illinois #23 Notre Dame #9 Baylor **#18 St. John's** **#10 BYU**	L 79–76; L 81–64; L 73–61; L 83–79; **W** 68–64; **W** 86–71; L 89–67
2011–12 (1–1)	#16 Saint Mary's **#7 Ohio State**	**W** 73–59; L 73–66
2012–13 (1–2)	#13 Illinois #22 Oklahoma State #13 Butler	L 85–74; **W** 69–68; L 64–63
2013–14 (0–2)	#24 Memphis **#4 Arizona**	L 60–54; L 84–61
2014–15 (1–2)	#22 SMU #3 Arizona **#4 Duke**	**W** 72–56; L 66–63^{OT} L 66–52
2015–16 (3–3)	#25 Texas A&M #18 Connecticut #19 Arizona #16 SMU **#20 Seton Hall** **#13 Utah**	L 62–61; **W** 73–70; L 68–63; L 69–60; **W** 68–52; **W** 82–59
2016–17 (6–1)	#21 Iowa State #16 Arizona #21 Saint Mary's #20 Saint Mary's #19 Saint Mary's **#13 West Virginia** **#6 North Carolina**	**W** 73–71; **W** 69–62; **W** 79–56; **W** 74–64; **W** 74–56; **W** 61–58; L 71–65
2017–18 (2–2)	#7 Florida #4 Villanova #11 Saint Mary's **#17 Ohio State**	L 111–105^{2OT} L 88–72; **W** 78–65; **W** 90–84
2018–19 (2–3)	#1 Duke #7 Tennessee #12 North Carolina **#10 Florida State** **#9 Texas Tech**	**W** 89–87; L 76–73; L 103–90; **W** 72–58; L 75–69
2019–20 (3–1)	#11 Oregon #22 Washington #15 Arizona #23 BYU	**W** 73–72^{OT} **W** 83–76; **W** 84–80; L 91–78
2020–21 (6–1)	#6 Kansas #11 West Virginia #3 Iowa #16 Virginia **#19 Creighton** **#23 USC** **#3 Baylor**	**W** 102–90; **W** 87–82; **W** 99–88; **W** 98–75; **W** 83–65; **W** 85–66; L 86–70
2021–22 (5–4)	#5 Texas #2 UCLA #5 Duke #16 Alabama #25 Texas Tech #22 Saint Mary's #23 Saint Mary's #17 Saint Mary's **#17 Arkansas**	**W** 86–74; **W** 83–63; L 84–81; L 91–82; **W** 69–55; **W** 74–58; L 67–57; **W** 82–69; L 74–68
2022–23 (6–5)	#11 Texas #4 Kentucky #24 Purdue #6 Baylor #4 Alabama #18 Saint Mary's #15 Saint Mary's #16 Saint Mary's **#22 TCU** **#7 UCLA** **#10 UConn**	L 74–93; **W** 88–72; L 66–84; L 63–64; **W** 100–90; L 70–78^{OT} **W** 77–68; **W** 77–51; **W** 84–81; **W** 79–76; L 54–82
2023–24 (3–4)	#2 Purdue #5 UConn #17 Kentucky #17 Saint Mary's #21 Saint Mary's **#17 Kansas** **#3 Purdue**	L 63–73; L 63–76; **W** 89–85; **W** 70–57; L 60–69; **W** 89–68; L 68–80
2024–25 (3–4)	#8 Baylor #14 Indiana #4 Kentucky #18 UConn #22 UCLA #19 Saint Mary's **#2 Houston**	**W** 101–63; **W** 89–73; L 89–90^{OT} L 71–77; L 62–65; **W** 58–51; L 76–81

Teams in bold represent games Gonzaga played in the NCAA Division I men's basketball tournament.

== Postseason ==
=== NCAA tournament ===
The Bulldogs have appeared in 28 NCAA tournaments. The COVID-19 pandemic caused the cancellation of the 2020 NCAA tournament. This interrupted, but did not end, the Bulldogs' ongoing streak of 27 consecutive tournament appearances, including 9 straight Sweet 16 appearances from 2015 to 2024. Gonzaga's combined record is 48–28 (.632).

Year	Record	Seed	Round	Opponent	Result
1995	21–9	#14	First Round	#3 Maryland	L 87–63
1999	28–7	#10	First Round; Second Round; Sweet Sixteen; Elite Eight	#7 Minnesota #2 Stanford #6 Florida #1 UConn	W 75–63; W 82–74; W 73–72; L 67–62
2000	26–9	#10	First Round; Second Round; Sweet Sixteen	#7 Louisville #2 St. John's #6 Purdue	W 77–66; W 82–76; L 75–66
2001	26–7	#12	First Round; Second Round; Sweet Sixteen	#5 Virginia #13 Indiana State #1 Michigan State	W 86–85; W 85–68; L 77–62
2002	29–4	#6	First Round	#11 Wyoming	L 73–66
2003	24–9	#9	First Round; Second Round	#8 Cincinnati #1 Arizona	W 74–69; L 96–95 ^{2OT}
2004	28–3	#2	First Round; Second Round	#15 Valparaiso #10 Nevada	W 76–49; L 91–72
2005	26–5	#3	First Round; Second Round	#14 Winthrop #6 Texas Tech	W 74–64; L 71–69
2006	29–4	#3	First Round; Second Round; Sweet Sixteen	#14 Xavier #6 Indiana #2 UCLA	W 79–75; W 90–80; L 73–71
2007	23–11	#10	First Round	#7 Indiana	L 70–57
2008	25–8	#7	First Round	#10 Davidson	L 82–76
2009	28–6	#4	First Round; Second Round; Sweet Sixteen	#13 Akron #12 Western Kentucky #1 North Carolina	W 77–64; W 83–81; L 98–77
2010	27–7	#8	First Round; Second Round	#9 Florida State #1 Syracuse	W 67–60; L 87–65
2011	25–10	#11	First Round; Second Round	#6 St. John's #3 BYU	W 86–71; L 89–67
2012	26–7	#7	First Round; Second Round	#10 West Virginia #2 Ohio State	W 77–54; L 73–66
2013	32–3	#1	First Round; Second Round	#16 Southern #9 Wichita State	W 64–58; L 76–70
2014	29–7	#8	First Round; Second Round	#9 Oklahoma State #1 Arizona	W 85–77; L 84–61
2015	35–3	#2	First Round; Second Round; Sweet Sixteen; Elite Eight	#15 North Dakota State #7 Iowa #11 UCLA #1 Duke	W 86–76; W 87–68; W 74–62; L 66–52
2016	28–8	#11	First Round; Second Round; Sweet Sixteen	#6 Seton Hall #3 Utah #10 Syracuse	W 68–52; W 82–59; L 63–60
2017	37–2	#1	First Round; Second Round; Sweet Sixteen; Elite Eight; Final Four; National Championship	#16 South Dakota State #8 Northwestern #4 West Virginia #11 Xavier #7 South Carolina #1 North Carolina	W 66–46; W 79–73; W 61–58; W 83–59; W 77–73; L 71–65
2018	32–5	#4	First Round; Second Round; Sweet Sixteen	#13 UNC Greensboro #5 Ohio State #9 Florida State	W 68–64; W 90–84; L 75–60
2019	33–4	#1	First Round; Second Round; Sweet Sixteen; Elite Eight	#16 Fairleigh Dickinson #9 Baylor #4 Florida State #3 Texas Tech	W 87–49; W 83–71; W 72–58; L 75–69
2021	31–1	#1	First Round; Second Round; Sweet Sixteen; Elite Eight; Final Four; National Championship	#16 Norfolk State #8 Oklahoma #5 Creighton #6 USC #11 UCLA #1 Baylor	W 98–55; W 87–71; W 83–65; W 85–66; W 93–90 ^{OT} L 86–70
2022	28–4	#1	First Round; Second Round; Sweet Sixteen	#16 Georgia State #9 Memphis #4 Arkansas	W 93–72; W 82–78; L 74–68
2023	31–6	#3	First Round; Second Round; Sweet Sixteen; Elite Eight	#14 Grand Canyon #6 TCU #2 UCLA #4 UConn	W 82–70; W 84–81; W 79–76; L 82–54
2024	27–8	#5	First Round; Second Round; Sweet Sixteen	#12 McNeese #4 Kansas #1 Purdue	W 86–65; W 89–68; L 68–80
2025	26–9	#8	First Round; Second Round	#9 Georgia #1 Houston	W 89–68; L 76–81
2026	31–4	#3	First Round; Second Round	#14 Kennesaw State #11 Texas	W 73–64; L 74–68

==== NCAA tournament seeding history ====
The NCAA began seeding the tournament with the 1979 edition.

Year →	'95	'99	'00	'01	'02	'03	'04	'05	'06	'07	'08	'09	'10	'11	'12	'13	'14	'15	'16	'17	'18	'19	'21	'22	'23	'24	'25	'26
Seed →	14	10	10	12	6	9	2	3	3	10	7	4	8	11	7	1	8	2	11	1	4	1	1	1	3	5	8	3

=== NIT results ===
The Bulldogs have appeared in three National Invitation Tournaments (NIT). All five games were played on the road, and Gonzaga's combined record is 2–3 (.400).

Year	Round	Opponent	Result	References
1994	First Round; Second Round	at Stanford at Kansas State	W 80–76; L 66–64	
1996	First Round	at Washington State	L 92–73	
1998	First Round; Second Round	at Wyoming at Hawaiʻi	W 69–55; L 78–70	

== Current roster ==
2026–27 Gonzaga Bulldogs men's basketball team
Players
Coaches

Pos.	#	Name	Height	Weight	Year	Previous school	Hometown
F	34	Braden Huff	6 ft 10 in (2.08 m)	250 lb (113 kg)	GS	Glenbard West	Glen Ellyn, IL
G	7	Nathan De Sousa	6 ft 3 in (1.91 m)	200 lb (91 kg)	GS	Cholet	Jussy, France
G	2	Javon Bennett	5 ft 10 in (1.78 m)	165 lb (75 kg)	GS	Dayton	Orlando, FL
F	9	Chauncey Wiggins (I)	6 ft 11 in (2.11 m)	225 lb (102 kg)	GS	Florida State	Atlanta, GA
G	5	Xaivian Lee	6 ft 4 in (1.93 m)	185 lb (84 kg)	GS	Florida	Toronto, ON
F	13	Izan Almansa	6 ft 10 in (2.08 m)	220 lb (100 kg)	Jr	Real Madrid	Murcia, Spain
G	4	Davis Fogle	6 ft 7 in (2.01 m)	200 lb (91 kg)	So	AZ Compass Prep	Anacortes, WA
F	32	Parker Jefferson	6 ft 9 in (2.06 m)	240 lb (109 kg)	So	Inglewood	Waxahachie, TX
G	14	Alonzo Metz (W)	5 ft 11 in (1.8 m)	165 lb (75 kg)	So	Riviera Prep	Portland, OR
G	1	Isiah Harwell	6 ft 6 in (1.98 m)	216 lb (98 kg)	So	Houston	Pocatello, ID
C	35	Massamba Diop	7 ft 1 in (2.16 m)	245 lb (111 kg)	So	Arizona State	Rufisque, Senegal
F	33	Sam Funches	7 ft 0 in (2.13 m)	238 lb (108 kg)	Fr	Germantown	Gluckstadt, MS
F	0	Luca Foster	6 ft 5 in (1.96 m)	195 lb (88 kg)	Fr	Link Academy	Philadelphia, PA
G	30	Carter Nilson (W)	6 ft 5 in (1.96 m)	185 lb (84 kg)	Fr	Gonzaga Prep	Spokane, WA
G	3	Juwan Ekanga	6 ft 6 in (1.98 m)	207 lb (94 kg)	Fr	JL Bourg	Aix-les-Bains, France

Head coach

- Mark Few (Oregon)

Assistant coach(es)

- Brian Michaelson (Gonzaga)
- Stephen Gentry (Gonzaga)
- R-Jay Barsh (Puget Sound)
- Zach Norvell Jr. (Gonzaga)
- Kurt Bambauer (Gonzaga)

Legend

- (C) Team captain
- (S) Suspended
- (I) Ineligible
- (W) Walk-on
- Injured
- Current redshirt

Roster
Last update: 2026-09-28

- Roster is subject to change as/if players transfer or leave the program for other reasons.

== WCC and Big Sky Conference Awards ==
=== Conference Coach of the Year ===
Year	Coach	Conference
2021	Mark Few	WCC
2019	Mark Few	WCC
2018	Mark Few	WCC
2017	Mark Few	WCC
2015	Mark Few	WCC
2013	Mark Few	WCC
2010	Mark Few	WCC
2008	Mark Few	WCC
2006	Mark Few	WCC
2005	Mark Few	WCC
More: Year / Coach / Conference; 2004 / Mark Few / WCC; 2003 / Mark Few / WCC; 2002 / Mark Few / WCC; 2001 / Mark Few / WCC; 1998 / Dan Monson / WCC; 1994 / Dan Fitzgerald / WCC; 1981 / Dan Fitzgerald / WCC; 1966 / Hank Anderson / Big Sky

=== WCC Player of the Year ===
See: WCC Player of the Year

Year	Player
2023	Drew Timme
2022	Drew Timme
2021	Corey Kispert
2020	Filip Petrušev
2019	Rui Hachimura
2017	Nigel Williams-Goss
2015	Kevin Pangos
2013	Kelly Olynyk
2010	Matt Bouldin
2008	Jeremy Pargo
More: Year / Player; 2007 / Derek Raivio; 2006 / Adam Morrison; 2005 / Ronny Turiaf; 2004 / Blake Stepp; 2003 / Blake Stepp; 2002 / Dan Dickau; 2001 / Casey Calvary; 1998 / Bakari Hendrix; 1994 / Jeff Brown; 1984 / John Stockton

=== WCC Defensive Player of the Year ===
Year	Player
2022	Chet Holmgren
2019	Brandon Clarke
2016	Eric McClellan
2015	Gary Bell Jr.
2013	Mike Hart
2012	Robert Sacre
2005	Erroll Knight
2001	Mark Spink
2000	Mike Nilson

=== 1st-Team All-Conference ===
Year	Player	Conference
2023	Julian Strawther	WCC
2023	Drew Timme	WCC
2022	Chet Holmgren	WCC
2022	Andrew Nembhard	WCC
2022	Drew Timme	WCC
2021	Joël Ayayi	WCC
2021	Corey Kispert	WCC
2021	Jalen Suggs	WCC
2021	Drew Timme	WCC
2020	Corey Kispert	WCC
2020	Killian Tillie	WCC
2020	Filip Petrušev	WCC
More: Year / Player / Conference; 2019 / Brandon Clarke / WCC; 2019 / Rui Hachimura / WCC; 2019 / Zach Norvell Jr. / WCC; 2019 / Josh Perkins / WCC; 2018 / Rui Hachimura / WCC; 2018 / Josh Perkins / WCC; 2018 / Johnathan Williams / WCC; 2017 / Przemek Karnowski / WCC; 2017 / Johnathan Williams / WCC; 2017 / Nigel Williams-Goss / WCC; 2016 / Domantas Sabonis / WCC; 2016 / Kyle Wiltjer / WCC; 2015 / Przemek Karnowski / WCC; 2015 / Kevin Pangos / WCC; 2015 / Kyle Wiltjer / WCC; 2014 / Sam Dower / WCC; 2014 / Kevin Pangos / WCC; 2013 / Elias Harris / WCC; 2013 / Kelly Olynyk / WCC; 2013 / Kevin Pangos / WCC; 2012 / Elias Harris / WCC; 2012 / Kevin Pangos / WCC; 2012 / Robert Sacre / WCC; 2011 / Steven Gray / WCC; 2011 / Robert Sacre / WCC; 2010 / Matt Bouldin / WCC; 2010 / Steven Gray / WCC; 2010 / Elias Harris / WCC; 2009 / Matt Bouldin / WCC; 2009 / Josh Heytvelt / WCC; 2008 / Matt Bouldin / WCC; 2008 / Jeremy Pargo / WCC; 2008 / David Pendergraft / WCC; 2007 / Jeremy Pargo / WCC; 2007 / Derek Raivio / WCC; 2006 / J. P. Batista / WCC; 2006 / Adam Morrison / WCC; 2005 / Adam Morrison / WCC; 2005 / Derek Raivio / WCC; 2005 / Ronny Turiaf / WCC; 2004 / Blake Stepp / WCC; 2004 / Ronny Turiaf / WCC; 2004 / Cory Violette / WCC; 2003 / Blake Stepp / WCC; 2003 / Ronny Turiaf / WCC; 2003 / Cory Violette / WCC; 2002 / Dan Dickau / WCC; 2002 / Zach Gourde / WCC; 2002 / Cory Violette / WCC; 2001 / Casey Calvary / WCC; 2001 / Dan Dickau / WCC; 2000 / Casey Calvary / WCC; 2000 / Richie Frahm / WCC; 2000 / Matt Santangelo / WCC; 1999 / Jeremy Eaton / WCC; 1999 / Richie Frahm / WCC; 1999 / Quentin Hall / WCC; 1999 / Matt Santangelo / WCC; 1998 / Bakari Hendrix / WCC; 1998 / Matt Santangelo / WCC; 1997 / Bakari Hendrix / WCC; 1997 / Lorenzo Rollins / WCC; 1996 / Kyle Dixon / WCC; 1996 / Paul Rogers / WCC; 1995 / Kyle Dixon / WCC; 1994 / Jeff Brown / WCC; 1994 / Geoff Goss / WCC; 1993 / Jeff Brown / WCC; 1992 / Jeff Brown / WCC; 1992 / Jarrod Davis / WCC; 1991 / Jarrod Davis / WCC; 1990 / Jim McPhee / WCC; 1989 / Jim McPhee / WCC; 1989 / Doug Spradley / WCC; 1988 / Doug Spradley / WCC; 1987 / Dale Haaland / WCC; 1987 / Jim McPhee / WCC; 1986 / Jeff Condill / WCC; 1984 / John Stockton / WCC; 1983 / Bryce McPhee / WCC; 1983 / John Stockton / WCC; 1982 / Bill Dunlap / WCC; 1981 / Don Baldwin / WCC; 1979 / Paul Cathey / Big Sky; 1977 / Jim Grady / Big Sky; 1975 / Ken Tyler / Big Sky; 1974 / Stewart Morill / Big Sky; 1973 / Greg Sten / Big Sky; 1972 / Joe Clayton / Big Sky; 1970 / Bill Quigg / Big Sky; 1967 / Gary Lechman / Big Sky; 1966 / Gary Lechman / Big Sky; 1966 / Bill Suter / Big Sky; 1965 / Gary Lechman / Big Sky; 1964 / Bill Wilson / Big Sky

=== 2nd-Team All-Conference ===
Year	Player	Conference
2021	Andrew Nembhard	WCC
2018	Killian Tillie	WCC
2017	Zach Collins	WCC
2015	Gary Bell Jr.	WCC
2015	Domantas Sabonis	WCC
2015	Byron Wesley	WCC
1980	Carl Pierce	WCC
1978	Jim DeWeese	Big Sky
1976	Jim Grady	Big Sky
1974	Ken Tyler	Big Sky
More: Year / Player / Conference; 1973 / Joe Clayton / Big Sky; 1972 / Greg Sten / Big Sky; 1971 / Bill Quigg / Big Sky; 1969 / Joe McNair / Big Sky; 1968 / Paz Rocha / Big Sky; 1965 / Bill Suter / Big Sky; 1964 / Bill Suter / Big Sky

=== All-WCC Honorable Mention Team ===
Year	Player
2023	Anton Watson
2022	Rasir Bolton
2022	Julian Strawther
2020	Joël Ayayi
2020	Ryan Woolridge
2018	Silas Melson
2018	Zach Norvell Jr.
2017	Jordan Mathews
2017	Josh Perkins
2014	Przemek Karnowski
More: Year / Player; 2013 / Gary Bell Jr.; 2011 / Elias Harris; 2009 / Austin Daye; 2009 / Steven Gray; 2009 / Jeremy Pargo; 2008 / Austin Daye; 2007 / Sean Mallon; 2005 / J. P. Batista; 2002 / Blake Stepp; 2001 / Zach Gourde; 2001 / Mark Spink; 2001 / Blake Stepp; 1999 / Casey Calvary; 1998 / Richie Frahm; 1997 / Matt Santangelo; 1996 / Jon Kinloch; 1996 / Scott Snider; 1995 / Jon Kinloch; 1995 / John Rillie; 1994 / John Rillie; 1993 / Marc Armstead; 1993 / Geoff Goss; 1993 / Matt Stanford; 1988 / Danny Roe; 1987 / Doug Spradley; 1986 / Dale Haaland; 1986 / Jim McPhee; 1985 / Tim Ruff; 1985 / Jason Van Nort; 1984 / Jeff Condill; 1984 / Tim Ruff; 1982 / Tim Wagoner; 1981 / Hugh Hobus; 1981 / Eddie Taylor; 1980 / James Sheppard

=== WCC Tournament MVP ===
See: WCC tournament MVP

Year	Player
2023	Drew Timme
2022	Andrew Nembhard
2021	Jalen Suggs
2020	Joël Ayayi
2018	Killian Tillie
2017	Nigel Williams-Goss
2016	Kyle Wiltjer
2015	Kyle Wiltjer
2014	Sam Dower
2013	Elias Harris
More: Year / Player; 2011 / Marquise Carter; 2009 / Micah Downs; 2007 / Derek Raivio; 2006 / Adam Morrison; 2005 / Adam Morrison; 2004 / Ronny Turiaf; 2002 / Dan Dickau; 2001 / Dan Dickau; 2000 / Casey Calvary; 1999 / Matt Santangelo; 1995 / John Rillie

=== Conference All-Tournament Team ===
Year	Player	Conference
2023	Julian Strawther	WCC
2023	Drew Timme	WCC
2023	Anton Watson	WCC
2022	Chet Holmgren	WCC
2022	Andrew Nembhard	WCC
2022	Drew Timme	WCC
2021	Corey Kispert	WCC
2021	Jalen Suggs	WCC
2021	Drew Timme	WCC
2020	Joël Ayayi	WCC
2020	Filip Petrušev	WCC
2020	Drew Timme	WCC
More: Year / Player / Conference; 2019 / Brandon Clarke / WCC; 2018 / Killian Tillie / WCC; 2018 / Johnathan Williams / WCC; 2017 / Przemek Karnowski / WCC; 2017 / Johnathan Williams / WCC; 2017 / Nigel Williams-Goss / WCC; 2016 / Domantas Sabonis / WCC; 2016 / Kyle Wiltjer / WCC; 2015 / Przemek Karnowski / WCC; 2015 / Kevin Pangos / WCC; 2015 / Kyle Wiltjer / WCC; 2014 / Sam Dower / WCC; 2014 / David Stockton / WCC; 2013 / Elias Harris / WCC; 2013 / Kelly Olynyk / WCC; 2012 / Elias Harris / WCC; 2012 / Kevin Pangos / WCC; 2011 / Marquise Carter / WCC; 2011 / Steven Gray / WCC; 2010 / Matt Bouldin / WCC; 2010 / Steven Gray / WCC; 2009 / Matt Bouldin / WCC; 2009 / Micah Downs / WCC; 2009 / Jeremy Pargo / WCC; 2008 / Jeremy Pargo / WCC; 2007 / Micah Downs / WCC; 2007 / David Pendergraft / WCC; 2007 / Derek Raivio / WCC; 2006 / J. P. Batista / WCC; 2006 / Adam Morrison / WCC; 2005 / J. P. Batista / WCC; 2005 / Adam Morrison / WCC; 2005 / Derek Raivio / WCC; 2004 / Blake Stepp / WCC; 2004 / Ronny Turiaf / WCC; 2004 / Cory Violette / WCC; 2003 / Blake Stepp / WCC; 2003 / Ronny Turiaf / WCC; 2002 / Dan Dickau / WCC; 2002 / Blake Stepp / WCC; 2002 / Cory Violette / WCC; 2001 / Casey Calvary / WCC; 2001 / Dan Dickau / WCC; 2001 / Blake Stepp / WCC; 2000 / Casey Calvary / WCC; 2000 / Ryan Floyd / WCC; 2000 / Matt Santangelo / WCC; 1999 / Quentin Hall / WCC; 1999 / Matt Santangelo / WCC; 1998 / Bakari Hendrix / WCC; 1998 / Matt Santangelo / WCC; 1996 / Jon Kinloch / WCC; 1996 / Paul Rogers / WCC; 1996 / Lorenzo Rollins / WCC; 1995 / John Rillie / WCC; 1992 / Jeff Brown / WCC; 1992 / Jarrod Davis / WCC; 1977 / Jim Grady / Big Sky

=== WCC Newcomer of the Year ===
Year	Player
2022	Chet Holmgren
2021	Jalen Suggs
2019	Brandon Clarke
2018	Zach Norvell Jr.
2017	Nigel Williams-Goss
2015	Kyle Wiltjer
2012	Kevin Pangos
2011	Marquise Carter
2010	Elias Harris
2005	J. P. Batista

=== WCC Freshman of the Year ===
Year	Player
2001	Blake Stepp
1997	Matt Santangelo

=== WCC All-Freshmen Team ===
Year	Player
2022	Nolan Hickman
2022	Chet Holmgren
2021	Oumar Ballo
2021	Jalen Suggs
2020	Drew Timme
2019	Filip Petrušev
2018	Zach Norvell Jr.
2017	Zach Collins
2016	Josh Perkins
2015	Domantas Sabonis
2013	Przemek Karnowski
More: Year / Player; 2012 / Gary Bell Jr.; 2012 / Kevin Pangos; 2011 / Sam Dower; 2010 / Elias Harris; 2008 / Steven Gray; 2008 / Austin Daye; 2007 / Matt Bouldin; 2005 / David Pendergraft; 2004 / Sean Mallon; 2004 / Adam Morrison

=== WCC Sixth Player of the Year ===
Year	Player
2023	Malachi Smith
2021	Andrew Nembhard

=== WCC Men's Scholar-Athlete of the Year ===
Year	Player
2021	Corey Kispert
2019	Josh Perkins
2017	Nigel Williams-Goss
2016	Kyle Wiltjer
2004	Blake Stepp
2002	Dan Dickau
1994	Jeff Brown
1992	Jarrod Davis
1985	Bryce McPhee
1984	John Stockton
1982	Bill Dunlap

=== WCC All-Academic Team ===
Year	Player
2023	Rasir Bolton
2021	Corey Kispert
2020	Corey Kispert
2019	Corey Kispert
2019	Josh Perkins
2018	Josh Perkins
2017	Przemek Karnowski
2017	Josh Perkins
2017	Nigel Williams-Goss
2016	Kyle Dranginis
2016	Domantas Sabonis
2016	Kyle Wiltjer
More: Year / Player; 2015 / Przemek Karnowski; 2015 / Kevin Pangos; 2014 / Drew Barham; 2013 / Mike Hart; 2013 / Kelly Olynyk; 2012 / Mike Hart; 2011 / Kelly Olynyk; 2009 / Josh Heytvelt; 2008 / David Pendergraft; 2007 / Sean Mallon; 2007 / David Pendergraft; 2006 / Sean Mallon; 2005 / Sean Mallon; 2004 / Kyle Bankhead; 2004 / Blake Stepp; 2003 / Kyle Bankhead; 2003 / Blake Stepp; 2002 / Kyle Bankhead; 2002 / Dan Dickau; 2001 / Dan Dickau; 2001 / Blake Stepp; 2000 / Mike Nilson; 2000 / Ryan Floyd; 2000 / Matt Santangelo; 2000 / Jimmy Tricco; 1999 / Ryan Floyd; 1999 / Matt Santangelo; 1998 / Carl Crider; 1998 / Ryan Floyd; 1997 / Carl Crider; 1997 / John Nemeth; 1996 / Jason Bond; 1996 / Jon Kinloch; 1996 / Scott Morgan; 1996 / Scott Snider; 1995 / Jason Bond; 1995 / Jon Kinloch; 1995 / Scott Morgan; 1995 / Scott Snider; 1994 / Jeff Brown; 1994 / Jon Kinloch; 1993 / Jeff Brown; 1993 / Jon Kinloch; 1992 / Eric Brady; 1992 / Jeff Brown; 1992 / Jarrod Davis; 1991 / Eric Brady; 1991 / Jarrod Davis; 1991 / Martin Dioli

=== WCC Honorable Mention All-Academic Team ===
Year	Player
2019	Jeremy Jones
2011	Mike Hart

== National awards ==
=== National Coach of the Year ===
- Mark Few (2017) AP, Naismith, Henry Iba Award, TSN, USA Today, NBC
- Mark Few (2021) NABC, Naismith

=== National Player of the Year ===
- Adam Morrison (2006) USBWA, NABC, CBS-Chevrolet, Oscar Robertson

=== Kareem Abdul-Jabbar Award (Best Center) ===
- Przemek Karnowski (2017)

=== Karl Malone Award (Best Power Forward) ===
- Drew Timme (2021)

=== Julius Erving Award (Best Small Forward) ===
- Rui Hachimura (2019)
- Corey Kispert (2021)

=== First Team All-American ===
- Dan Dickau (2002) AP, Wooden, USBWA, TSN
- Adam Morrison (2006) AP (unanimous), Wooden, USBWA, NABC, TSN
- Kelly Olynyk (2013) AP, Wooden, USBWA, NABC, TSN, SI, CBS
- Nigel Williams-Goss (2017) Wooden, USBWA, SI
- Rui Hachimura (2019) NABC, USBWA, TSN
- Corey Kispert (2021) AP, NABC, TSN, USBWA, Wooden

=== Second Team All-American ===
- Frank Burgess (1960, 1961) Helms, (1961) AP, TSN, NEA, NCAB
- Gary Lechman (1967) Helms
- Casey Calvary (2001) Wooden
- Dan Dickau (2002) NABC
- Blake Stepp (2004) AP, Wooden, USBWA, NABC, TSN
- Kyle Wiltjer (2015) Wooden, USBWA, NABC, SI, CBS
- Nigel Williams-Goss (2017) AP, NABC, TSN, USA Today, CBS, NBC, Fox
- Brandon Clarke (2019) Wooden, SI, CBS, NBC
- Rui Hachimura (2019) AP, Wooden, CBS
- Filip Petrušev (2020) Wooden, NABC, CBS
- Jalen Suggs (2021) AP, NABC, TSN, USBWA, Wooden
- Drew Timme (2021) AP, NABC, TSN, USBWA, Wooden

=== Third Team All-American ===
- Frank Burgess (1961) NABC, UPI
- Kevin Pangos (2015) AP, NABC, TSN, USA Today
- Kyle Wiltjer (2015) AP
- Domantas Sabonis (2016) CBS
- Brandon Clarke (2019) AP, TSN
- Rui Hachimura (2019) SI, NBC
- Filip Petrušev (2020) AP, USBWA, TSN, SI

=== Honorable Mention All-American ===
- Frank Burgess (1960) AP
- Bill Dunlap (1982) AP
- John Stockton (1984) AP, UPI
- Matt Santangelo (1999) AP
- Casey Calvary (2001) AP
- Blake Stepp (2003) AP
- Ronny Turiaf (2004, 2005) AP
- Adam Morrison (2005) AP
- JP Batista (2006) AP
- Derek Raivio (2007) AP
- Jeremy Pargo (2008) AP
- Matt Bouldin (2010) AP
- Domantas Sabonis (2016) AP, SI
- Kyle Wiltjer (2016) AP
- Przemek Karnowski (2017) AP
- Johnathan Williams (2018) AP

== National academic honors ==
=== CSC Academic All-America Hall of Fame ===
- John Stockton (1984), Class of 2002

=== CSC Academic All-American of the Year ===
- Jeff Brown (1994)
- Corey Kispert (2021)

=== Anson Mount Scholar-Athlete of the Year ===
- Jeff Brown (1994)

=== DI-AAA ADA Men's Scholar-Athlete of the Year ===
- Kelly Olynyk (2013)
- Kyle Wiltjer (2016)
- Nigel Williams-Goss (2017)

=== DI-AAA ADA Men's Scholar-Athlete Team ===
- Blake Stepp (2004)
- Kyle Bankhead (2004)
- Sean Mallon (2005, 2006, 2007)
- Kelly Olynyk (2013)
- Kevin Pangos (2015)
- Kyle Wiltjer (2016)
- Przemek Karnowski (2017)
- Nigel Williams-Goss (2017)
- Josh Perkins (2019)
- Corey Kispert (2021)

=== First Team CSC Academic All-American ===
- Bryce McPhee (1985)
- Jarrod Davis (1992)
- Jeff Brown (1993, 1994)
- Dan Dickau (2002)
- Kelly Olynyk (2013)
- Nigel Williams-Goss (2017)
- Corey Kispert (2021)

=== Second Team CSC Academic All-American ===
- Bryce McPhee (1984)
- John Stockton (1984)
- Jim McPhee (1990)
- Jarrod Davis (1991)
- Blake Stepp (2004)
- Domantas Sabonis (2016)

=== Third Team CSC Academic All-American ===
- Scott Finnie (1978)
- Bryce McPhee (1983)
- Jeff Brown (1992)
- Blake Stepp (2003)

=== First Team Senior CLASS All-American ===
- Blake Stepp (2004)
- Kevin Pangos (2015)
- Przemek Karnowski (2017)
- Corey Kispert (2021)

=== Second Team Senior CLASS All-American ===
- Ronny Turiaf (2005)
- Matt Bouldin (2010)
- Kyle Wiltjer (2016)
- Johnathan Williams (2018)
- Josh Perkins (2019)

=== Elite 90 Award ===
- Nigel Williams-Goss (2017)

== McDonald's All-Americans ==
Eight McDonald's All-Americans have played for Gonzaga. Of these, five have started their college basketball careers with the Bulldogs—Zach Collins, Jalen Suggs, Hunter Sallis, Chet Holmgren, and Nolan Hickman. Suggs was selected for the 2020 McDonald's All-American game, which was canceled due to the COVID-19 pandemic. The 2021 McDonald's All-American game, to which Hickman and Holmgren were selected, was also canceled due to COVID-19.

Year	Player	First College Team	Gonzaga Seasons	Ref.
2025	Isiah Harwell	Houston	2027–present	
2021	Nolan Hickman	Gonzaga	2022–25	
2021	Chet Holmgren	Gonzaga	2022	
2021	Hunter Sallis	Gonzaga	2022–23	
2020	Jalen Suggs	Gonzaga	2021	
2016	Zach Collins	Gonzaga	2017	
2013	Nigel Williams-Goss	Washington	2016–17	
2011	Kyle Wiltjer	Kentucky	2014–16	
2005	Micah Downs	Kansas	2006–09	

== 5-star recruits ==
Twelve 5-star rated players have committed to Gonzaga, as rated in the final ranking projections by at least one major college basketball recruiting service (247Sports.com, ESPN.com, Rivals.com, and Scout.com). Among these players, eight began their college careers with the Bulldogs: Austin Daye, Domantas Sabonis, Zach Collins, Oumar Ballo, Jalen Suggs, Nolan Hickman, Chet Holmgren, and Hunter Sallis. Only Ballo did not make his debut immediately after his arrival at Gonzaga; he was to have debuted in the 2019–20 season, but was not academically cleared to play by the NCAA and was redshirted that season.

Year	Player	First College Team	Gonzaga Seasons	Recruiting Service(s)	Ref.
2025	Isiah Harwell	Houston	2027–present	247Sports.com, ESPN.com, Rivals.com	
2021	Nolan Hickman	Gonzaga	2022–25	ESPN.com, Rivals.com	
2021	Chet Holmgren	Gonzaga	2022	247Sports.com, ESPN.com, Rivals.com	
2021	Efton Reid	LSU	2023	247Sports.com, ESPN.com, Rivals.com	
2021	Hunter Sallis	Gonzaga	2022–23	247Sports.com, ESPN.com	
2020	Jalen Suggs	Gonzaga	2021	247Sports.com, ESPN.com, Rivals.com	
2019	Oumar Ballo	Gonzaga	2020–21	Rivals.com	
2018	Andrew Nembhard	Florida	2021–22	247Sports.com, Rivals.com	
2016	Zach Collins	Gonzaga	2017	247Sports.com, Rivals.com	
2014	Domantas Sabonis	Gonzaga	2015–16	247Sports.com	
2013	Nigel Williams-Goss	Washington	2016–17	ESPN.com	
2011	Kyle Wiltjer	Kentucky	2014–16	ESPN.com, Rivals.com, Scout.com	
2007	Austin Daye	Gonzaga	2008–09	ESPN.com, Rivals.com	
2005	Micah Downs	Kansas	2006–09	Scout.com	

== Players in the NBA ==
In this table, seasons at Gonzaga are categorized by the calendar years in which they end.

Draft Year	Round	Pick	Player	Gonzaga Seasons	Draft Team	All NBA Teams Played For	Pro Seasons	Ref.
2026	–	–	Michael Ajayi	2025	Undrafted	Charlotte Hornets 2027–present	2027–present	
2026	–	–	Graham Ike	2024–26	Undrafted	Golden State Warriors 2027–present	2027–present	
2025	–	–	Ryan Nembhard	2024–25	Undrafted	Dallas Mavericks 2026, Denver Nuggets 2027–present	2026–present	
2025	–	–	Hunter Sallis	2022–23	Undrafted	Philadelphia 76ers 2026	2026	
2024	2	54	Anton Watson	2020–24	Boston Celtics	New York Knicks 2025	2025	
2023	1	29	Julian Strawther	2021–23	Indiana Pacers	Denver Nuggets 2024–present	2024–present	
2023	–	–	Malachi Smith	2023	Undrafted	Brooklyn Nets 2026, Toronto Raptors 2027–present	2026–present	
2023	–	–	Drew Timme	2020–23	Undrafted	Brooklyn Nets 2025, Los Angeles Lakers 2026, Phoenix Suns 2027–present	2025–present	
2022	1	2	Chet Holmgren	2022	Oklahoma City Thunder	Oklahoma City Thunder 2023–present	2023–present	
2022	2	31	Andrew Nembhard	2021–22	Indiana Pacers	Indiana Pacers 2023–present	2023–present	
2021	1	5	Jalen Suggs	2021	Orlando Magic	Orlando Magic 2022–present	2022–present	
2021	1	15	Corey Kispert	2018–21	Washington Wizards	Washington Wizards 2022–2026, Atlanta Hawks 2026–present	2022–present	
2021	2	50	Filip Petrušev	2019–20	Philadelphia 76ers	Philadelphia 76ers 2024, Sacramento Kings 2024	2024	
2021	–	–	Joël Ayayi	2018–21	Undrafted	Washington Wizards 2022	2022	
2020	–	–	Killian Tillie	2017–20	Undrafted	Memphis Grizzlies 2021–22	2021–22	
2019	1	9	Rui Hachimura	2017–19	Washington Wizards	Washington Wizards 2020–23, Los Angeles Lakers 2023–26, Los Angeles Clippers 2027–present	2020–present	
2019	1	21	Brandon Clarke	2018–19	Oklahoma City Thunder	Memphis Grizzlies 2020–26	2020–26	
2019	–	–	Zach Norvell Jr.	2017–19	Undrafted	Los Angeles Lakers 2020, Golden State Warriors 2020	2020	
2018	–	–	Johnathan Williams	2016–18	Undrafted	Los Angeles Lakers 2019, Washington Wizards 2020	2019–20	
2017	1	10	Zach Collins	2017	Sacramento Kings	Portland Trail Blazers 2018–21, San Antonio Spurs 2022–25, Chicago Bulls 2025–present	2018–present	
2017	2	55	Nigel Williams-Goss	2016–17	Utah Jazz	Utah Jazz 2020	2020	
2016	1	11	Domantas Sabonis	2015–16	Orlando Magic	Oklahoma City Thunder 2017, Indiana Pacers 2018–22; Sacramento Kings 2022–present	2017–present	
2016	–	–	Kyle Wiltjer	2014–16	Undrafted	Houston Rockets 2017	2017	
2015	–	–	Kevin Pangos	2012–15	Undrafted	Cleveland Cavaliers 2022	2022	
2014	–	–	David Stockton	2010–14	Undrafted	Sacramento Kings 2015, Utah Jazz 2018	2015, 2018	
2013	1	13	Kelly Olynyk	2010–13	Dallas Mavericks	Boston Celtics 2014–17, Miami Heat 2018–21, Houston Rockets 2021, Detroit Pistons 2022, Utah Jazz 2023–24, Toronto Raptors 2024–25, New Orleans Pelicans 2025, San Antonio Spurs 2026	2014–26	
2013	–	–	Elias Harris	2010–13	Undrafted	Los Angeles Lakers 2014	2014	
2012	2	60	Robert Sacre	2008–12	Los Angeles Lakers	Los Angeles Lakers 2013–16	2013–16	
2009	1	15	Austin Daye	2008–09	Detroit Pistons	Detroit Pistons 2010–13, Memphis Grizzlies 2013, Toronto Raptors 2014, San Antonio Spurs 2014–15, Atlanta Hawks 2015	2010–15	
2009	–	–	Jeremy Pargo	2006–09	Undrafted	Memphis Grizzlies 2012, Cleveland Cavaliers 2013, Philadelphia 76ers 2013, Golden State Warriors 2020	2012–13, 2020	
2006	1	3	Adam Morrison	2004–06	Charlotte Bobcats	Charlotte Bobcats 2007–09, Los Angeles Lakers 2009–10	2007–10	
2005	2	37	Ronny Turiaf	2002–05	Los Angeles Lakers	Los Angeles Lakers 2006–08, Golden State Warriors 2009–10, New York Knicks 2011, Washington Wizards 2012, Miami Heat 2012, Los Angeles Clippers 2013, Minnesota Timberwolves 2014–15	2006–15	
2004	2	58	Blake Stepp	2001–04	Minnesota Timberwolves	–	–	
2002	1	28	Dan Dickau	2000–02	Sacramento Kings	Atlanta Hawks 2003–04, Portland Trail Blazers 2004, Dallas Mavericks 2005, New Orleans Hornets 2005, Boston Celtics 2006, Portland Trail Blazers 2007, Los Angeles Clippers 2008	2003–08	
2002	2	40	Mario Kasun	2001	Los Angeles Clippers	Orlando Magic 2005–06	2005–06	
2000	–	–	Richie Frahm	1997–2000	Undrafted	Seattle SuperSonics 2004, Portland Trail Blazers 2005, Minnesota Timberwolves 2006, Houston Rockets 2006, Los Angeles Clippers 2008	2004–06, 2008	
1997	2	53	Paul Rogers	1995–97	Los Angeles Lakers	–	–	
1987	–	–	Mike Champion	1984–87	Undrafted	Seattle SuperSonics (1989)	1989	
1984	1	16	John Stockton	1981–84	Utah Jazz	Utah Jazz (1985–2003)	1985–2003	
1980	7	139	Carl Pierce	1979–80	Detroit Pistons	–	–	
1978	7	141	Jim DeWeese	1977–78	Atlanta Hawks	–	–	
1977	5	94	Jim Grady	1974–77	New Orleans Jazz	–	–	
1975	5	77	Ken Tyler	1973–75	Philadelphia 76ers	–	–	
1971	11	171	Howard Burford	1970–71	Portland Trail Blazers	–	–	
1971	15	171	Bill Quigg	1970–71	San Diego Rockets	–	–	
1967	3	113	Gary Lechman	1965–67	Seattle SuperSonics	–	–	
1961	3	27	Frank Burgess	1959–61	Los Angeles Lakers	–	–	
1960	9	64	Jean-Claude Lefebvre	1958–59	Los Angeles Lakers	–	–	

== Retired numbers ==
Gonzaga has retired five jersey numbers.

Gonzaga Bulldogs retired numbers
No.	Player	Pos.	Career	No. ret.	Ref.
3	Adam Morrison	SF / PF	2003–2006	2020	
11	Domantas Sabonis	PF / C	2014–2016	2025	
12	John Stockton	PG	1980–1984	2004	
13	Kelly Olynyk	PF / C	2009–2013	2022	
21	Dan Dickau	PG	2000–2002	2023	
44	Frank Burgess	SG	1958–1961	2005	

== Statistical records ==
- Bold: Players projected to be active in the 2024–25 season.
- Updated through the end of the 2023–24 season.

=== Individual career records ===
==== Career Points Leaders ====
Rank	Points	Player	Seasons
1	2,307	Drew Timme	2020–23
2	2,196	Frank Burgess	1959–61
3	2,015	Jim McPhee	1986–90
4	1,867	Adam Morrison	2004–06
5	1,857	Elias Harris	2010–13
6	1,824	Kevin Pangos	2012–15
7	1,810	Matt Santangelo	1997–00
8	1,723	Ronny Turiaf	2002–05
9	1,683	Matt Bouldin	2007–10
10	1,670	Blake Stepp	2001–04
More: Rank / Points / Player / Seasons; 11 / 1,646 / Jeff Brown / 1992–94; 12 / 1,621 / Richie Frahm / 1997–00; 13 / 1,586 / Corey Kispert / 2018–21; 14 / 1,562 / Josh Perkins / 2015–19; 15 / 1,547 / Jerry Vermillion / 1952–55; 16 / 1,509 / Casey Calvary / 1998–01; 17 / 1,507 / Rich Evans / 1947–50; 18 / 1,495 / Przemek Karnowski / 2013–17; 19 / 1,456 / Derek Raivio / 2004–07; 20 / 1,452 / Gary Lechman / 1965–67; 21 / 1,447 / Anton Watson / 2020–24; 22 / 1,432 / Steven Gray / 2008–11; 23 / 1,427 / Doug Spradley / 1986–89; 24 / 1,374 / Kyle Wiltjer / 2015–16; 25 / 1,354 / Bill Suter / 1963–66; 26 / 1,342 / Cory Violette / 2001–04; 27 / 1,340 / John Stockton / 1981–84; 28 / 1,291 / Gary Bell / 2012–15; 29 / 1,271 / Sam Dower / 2011–14; 30 / 1,270 / Robert Sacre / 2008–12; 31 / 1,245 / Jeremy Pargo / 2006–09; 32 / 1,230 / Rui Hachimura / 2017–19; 33 / 1,226 / Bill Wilson / 1962–64; 34 / 1,172 / Josh Heytvelt / 2006–09; 35 / 1,171 / Matt Stanford / 1991–94; 36 / 1,168 / Greg Sten / 1971–73; 37 / 1,143 / Zach Gourde / 2000–03; 38 / 1,125 / Dan Dickau / 2001–02; 39 / 1,121 / Jack Curran / 1947–50; 40 / 1,083 / Frank Walter / 1947–50; 41 / 1,071 / Jon Kinloch / 1993–96; 42 / 1,060 / Bryce McPhee / 1981–85; 43 / 1,054 / Jarrod Davis / 1991–92; 44 / 1,038 / John Rillie / 1993–95; 45 / 1,028 / Julian Strawther / 2021–23; 46 / 1,023 / Zach Norvell / 2018–19; 47 / 1,014 / Killian Tillie / 2017–20; 48 / 1,004 / Jeff Condill / 1984–86; 49 / 1,002 / Domantas Sabonis / 2015–16

==== Career Assists Leaders ====
Rank	Assists	Player	Seasons
1	709	Josh Perkins	2015–19
2	668	Matt Santangelo	1997–00
3	640	Blake Stepp	2001–04
4	589	Jeremy Pargo	2006–09
5	554	John Stockton	1981–84
6	536	Kevin Pangos	2012–15
7	444	Matt Bouldin	2007–10
8	423	David Stockton	2011–14
9	356	Derek Raivio	2004–07
10	339	Steven Gray	2008–11

==== Career Steals Leaders ====
Rank	Steals	Player	Seasons
1	262	John Stockton	1981–84
2	215	Anton Watson	2020–24
3	178	Josh Perkins	2015–19
4	177	Kevin Pangos	2012–15
5	170	Jeremy Pargo	2006–09
	170	Matt Bouldin	2007–10
7	167	David Stockton	2011–14
8	159	Doug Spradley	1986–89
9	158	Derek Raivio	2004–07
10	155	Steven Gray	2008–11

==== Career Rebounds Leaders ====
Rank	Reb.	Player	Seasons
1	1,670	Jerry Vermillion	1952–55
2	979	Elias Harris	2010–13
3	910	Gary Lechman	1965–67
4	896	Drew Timme	2020–23
5	880	Cory Violette	2001–04
6	859	Ronny Turiaf	2002–05
7	819	Przemek Karnowski	2013–17
8	783	Greg Sten	1971–73
9	780	Anton Watson	2020–24
10	757	Casey Calvary	1998–01
More: Rank / Reb. / Player / Seasons; 11 / 694 / Domantas Sabonis / 2015–16; 12 / 679 / Robert Sacre / 2008–12; 13 / 666 / Jim Dixon / 1962–63; 14 / 642 / Charlie Jordan / 1958–59; 15 / 634 / Jim Grady / 1975–77; 16 / 630 / Bill Quigg / 1969–71; 17 / 604 / Larry Brown / 1965–67

==== Career Blocked Shots Leaders ====
Rank	Blocks	Player	Seasons
1	207	Casey Calvary	1998–01
2	186	Robert Sacre	2008–12
3	179	Ronny Turiaf	2002–05
4	152	Przemek Karnowski	2013–17
5	124	Austin Daye	2008–09
6	117	Brandon Clarke	2019
	117	Chet Holmgren	2022
8	115	Drew Timme	2020–23
9	99	Tim Ruff	1982–85
10	95	Josh Heytvelt	2006–09

==== Career 3-Point Field Goals Made Leaders ====
Rank	3P Made	Player	Seasons
1	322	Kevin Pangos	2012–15
2	288	Blake Stepp	2001–04
3	280	Richie Frahm	1997–00
4	270	Corey Kispert	2018–21
5	252	Matt Santangelo	1997–00
6	251	Josh Perkins	2015–19
7	243	Derek Raivio	2004–07
8	230	John Rillie	1993–95
9	219	Gary Bell	2012–15
10	210	Steven Gray	2008–11

==== Career Field Goals Made Leaders ====
Rank	FG Made	Player	Seasons
1	910	Drew Timme	2020–23
2	800	Frank Burgess	1959–61
3	774	Jim McPhee	1986–90
4	669	Adam Morrison	2004–06
5	666	Elias Harris	2010–13
6	619	Matt Santangelo	1997–00
7	618	Jeff Brown	1992–94
8	615	Przemek Karnowski	2013–17
9	571	Anton Watson	2020–24
10	569	Casey Calvary	1998–01

==== Career Free Throws Made Leaders ====
Rank	FT Made	Player	Seasons
1	643	Ronny Turiaf	2002–05
2	596	Frank Burgess	1959–61
3	468	Drew Timme	2020–23
4	451	Robert Sacre	2008–12
5	447	Elias Harris	2010–13
6	425	Jim McPhee	1986–90
7	422	Gary Lechman	1965–67
8	401	Adam Morrison	2004–06
9	390	Jeff Brown	1992–94
10	389	Doug Spradley	1986–89

==== Career Field Goal Percentage Leaders ====
- Minimum 200 field goals attempted

Rank	FG%	Player	Seasons
1	68.7	Brandon Clarke	2019
2	65.2	Zach Collins	2017
3	63.2	Domantas Sabonis	2015–16
4	62.5	Bill Dunlap	1980–82
5	61.8	Drew Timme	2020–23
6	61.3	Scott Snider	1995–96
**7**	**60.9**	**Graham Ike**	**2024–24**
8	60.8	Chet Holmgren	2022
**9**	**59.8**	**Braden Huff**	**2024–24**
10	59.5	Przemek Karnowski	2013–17

==== Career Free Throw Percentage Leaders ====
- Minimum 100 free throws attempted

Rank	FT%	Player	Seasons
1	92.7	Derek Raivio	2004–07
2	87.3	Eddie White	1978–80
3	86.7	Nigel Williams-Goss	2017
4	86.5	Dan Dickau	2001–02
5	86.2	John Rillie	1993–95
6	85.4	Jim McPhee	1986–90
7	85.3	John Brodsky	1964–66
8	84.9	Doug Baldwin	1978–81
9	84.3	Jarrod Davis	1991–92
10	84.3	Kevin Pangos	2012–15

==== Career Wins Leaders ====
Rank	Wins	Player	Seasons
1	137	Przemek Karnowski	2013–17
2	134	Josh Perkins	2015–19
3	132	Anton Watson	2020–24
4	126	Silas Melson	2015–18
	126	Corey Kispert	2018–21
6	122	Kevin Pangos	2012–15
	122	Kyle Dranginis	2013–16
8	120	Drew Timme	2020–23
9	116	Gary Bell	2012–15
10	112	David Stockton	2011–14

==== Career Games Played Leaders ====
Rank	Games	Player	Seasons
1	153	Josh Perkins	2015–19
2	152	Przemek Karnowski	2013–17
3	151	Anton Watson	2020–24
4	143	Kyle Dranginis	2013–16
	143	Silas Melson	2015–18
6	142	Kevin Pangos	2012–15
7	138	David Stockton	2011–14
8	137	Sam Dower	2011–14
	137	Corey Kispert	2018–21
10	135	Robert Sacre	2008–12
	135	Elias Harris	2010–13
	135	Gary Bell	2012–15

=== Individual season records ===
==== Single-Season Points Leaders ====
Rank	Points	Player	Season
1	926	Adam Morrison	2005–06
2	842	Frank Burgess	1960–61
3	786	Drew Timme	2022–23
4	751	Frank Burgess	1959–60
5	736	Kyle Wiltjer	2015–16
6	729	Rui Hachimura	2018–19
7	672	Dan Dickau	2001–02
8	662	Jim McPhee	1989–90
9	656	Bakari Hendrix	1997–98
10	640	Nigel Williams-Goss	2016–17

==== Single-Season Assists Leaders ====
Rank	Assists	Player	Season
**1**	**243**	**Ryan Nembhard**	**2023–24**
2	234	Josh Perkins	2018–19
3	225	Matt Santangelo	1999–00
4	207	Blake Stepp	2003–04
5	201	John Stockton	1983–84
6	199	Jeremy Pargo	2007–08
7	198	Blake Stepp	2002–03
8	196	Josh Perkins	2017–18
9	184	John Stockton	1982–83
	184	Matt Santangelo	1998–99
	184	Andrew Nembhard	2021–22

==== Single-Season Steals Leaders ====
Rank	Steals	Player	Season
1	109	John Stockton	1983–84
2	68	John Stockton	1981–82
	68	John Stockton	1982–83
4	66	Anton Watson	2022–23
5	64	Nigel Williams-Goss	2016–17
6	62	Quentin Hall	1998–99
7	57	Steven Gray	2010–11
	57	Jalen Suggs	2020–21
9	55	David Stockton	2013–14
10	54	Blake Stepp	2002–03
	54	Josh Perkins	2018–19

==== Single-Season Rebounds Leaders ====
Rank	Reb.	Player	Season
1	456	Jerry Vermillion	1952–53
2	440	Jerry Vermillion	1954–55
3	426	Domantas Sabonis	2015–16
4	402	Jerry Vermillion	1953–54
5	372	Jerry Vermillion	1951–52
6	367	Charlie Jordan	1958–59
7	354	Gary Lechman	1966–67
8	353	Jim Dixon	1962–63
9	339	Joe Clayton	1971–72
10	333	Paul Cathey	1977–78

==== Single-Season Blocked Shots Leaders ====
Rank	Blocks	Player	Season
1	117	Brandon Clarke	2018–19
	117	Chet Holmgren	2021–22
3	70	Austin Daye	2008–09
4	69	Zach Collins	2016–17
5	66	Robert Sacre	2010–11
6	65	Robert Sacre	2009–10
7	62	Przemek Karnowski	2013–14
8	59	Ronny Turiaf	2004–05
9	57	Casey Calvary	1998–99
	57	Casey Calvary	1999–00

==== Single-Season 3-Pointers Made Leaders ====
Rank	3P Made	Player	Season
1	117	Dan Dickau	2001–02
2	98	Blake Stepp	2002–03
3	97	Zach Norvell	2018–19
4	96	John Rillie	1994–95
5	93	Richie Frahm	1998–99
6	91	John Rillie	1993–94
	91	Corey Kispert	2020–21
8	90	Richie Frahm	1999–00
	90	Kyle Wiltjer	2015–16
10	85	Derek Raivio	2006–07
	85	Jordan Mathews	2016–17

==== Single-Season Field Goals Made Leaders ====
Rank	FG Made	Player	Season
1	313	Drew Timme	2022–23
2	306	Adam Morrison	2005–06
3	304	Frank Burgess	1960–61
4	275	Rui Hachimura	2018–19
5	270	Frank Burgess	1959–60
6	260	Kyle Wiltjer	2015–16
7	257	Brandon Clarke	2018–19
8	242	Jim McPhee	1989–90
	242	Kyle Wiltjer	2014–15
10	241	Bakari Hendrix	1997–98

==== Single-Season Free Throws Made Leaders ====
Rank	FT Made	Player	Season
1	240	Adam Morrison	2005–06
2	234	Frank Burgess	1960–61
3	221	Frank Burgess	1959–60
4	212	Ronny Turiaf	2002–03
5	186	Gary Lechman	1966–67
6	180	Jerry Vermillion	1953–54
7	177	Ronny Turiaf	2004–05
8	165	Bakari Hendrix	1997–98
	165	Dan Dickau	2001–02
	165	Ronny Turiaf	2003–04
	165	J. P. Batista	2005–06

==== Single-Season Field Goal Percentage Leaders ====
- Minimum 2 field goals made per game

Rank	FG%	Player	Season
1	68.7	Brandon Clarke	2018–19
2	66.8	Domantas Sabonis	2014–15
3	65.8	Casey Calvary	1998–99
4	65.5	Drew Timme	2020–21
5	65.3	Bryce McPhee	1983–84
6	65.2	Zach Collins	2016–17
7	63.6	Bill Dunlap	1980–81
8	63.1	Anton Watson	2020–21
9	63.0	Zach Gourde	1999–00
10	63.0	Zach Gourde	2000–01

==== Single-Season Free Throw Percentage Leaders ====
- Minimum 2 free throws made per game

Rank	FT%	Player	Season
1	96.1	Derek Raivio	2006–07
2	91.2	Derek Raivio	2005–06
3	90.3	Derek Raivio	2004–05
4	89.2	Eddie White	1979–80
5	89.0	Jim McPhee	1986–87
6	88.1	Austin Daye	2007–08
7	87.9	John Rillie	1994–95
8	87.8	Corey Kispert	2020–21
9	87.6	Jim McPhee	1988–89
10	87.3	Kevin Pangos	2013–14

== Works cited ==
- Boling, Dave (2004). Tales From The Gonzaga Hardwood. New York: Sports Publishing LLC. ISBN 1582612722.
- Bradley, Bill (2009). ESPN College Basketball Encyclopedia: The Complete History of the Men's Game. New York: Random House Digital, Inc. ISBN 978-0345513922.
- Withers, Bud (2002). BraveHearts: The Against-All-Odds Rise of Gonzaga Basketball. New York: Triumph Books. ISBN 1572434996.
