= Steven Gray (basketball, born 1989) =

American basketball player

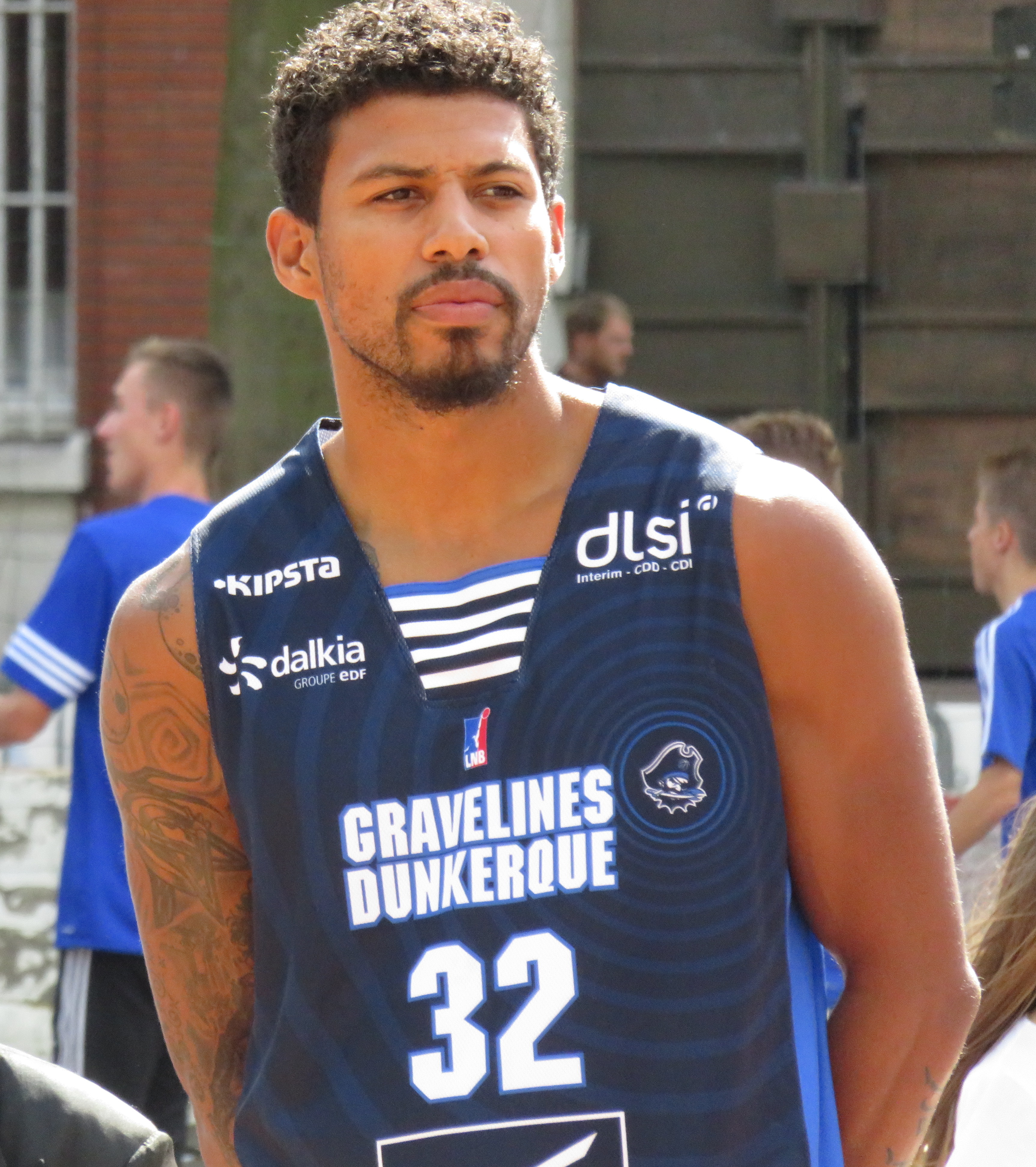
- Gray with BCM Gravelines

Free agent
- Position: Shooting guard

Personal information
- Born: April 8, 1989 (age 37) Irondale, Washington
- Listed height: 6 ft 5 in (1.96 m)
- Listed weight: 205 lb (93 kg)

Career information
- High school: Bainbridge (Bainbridge Island, Washington)
- College: Gonzaga (2007–2011)
- NBA draft: 2011: undrafted
- Playing career: 2011–2022

Career history
- 2011–2012: Ventspils
- 2012–2013: Chorale Roanne
- 2013: Tadamon Zouk
- 2013–2014: BCM Gravelines
- 2014–2015: JDA Dijon
- 2015–2016: BCM Gravelines
- 2016–2018: Lavrio
- 2018: Zadar
- 2018–2021: Peristeri
- 2021: Igokea
- 2021: Hapoel Holon
- 2021–2022: Peristeri

Career highlights
- French League Top Scorer (2015); Croatian League Top Scorer (2018); Greek League All Star (2020); French League All-Star (2015); Latvian League All-Star (2012); Bosnian Cup winner (2021); 2× First-team All-WCC (2010, 2011); WCC All-Freshman team (2008)

Steven Gray (born April 8, 1989) is an American former professional basketball player who last played for Peristeri of the Greek Basket League. He played college basketball for Gonzaga University. Gray spent his entire professional career overseas, playing in countries such as Greece, France, Israel, Lebanon, Latvia, Croatia and Bosnia.

== College career ==
After 125 games played for Gonzaga, Gray posted career averages of 11.5 points, 3.5 rebounds, 2.7 assists and 1.2 steals per outing. As a senior, he was voted to the NABC All-District 9 First Team and received All-West Coast Conference First Team honors in 2009–10 and 2010–11. He won the WCC Tournament with the Zags in 2009 and 2011.

== Professional career ==
On July 12, 2011, Gray signed his first professional contract with BK Ventspils of Latvia for the 2011–12 season.

After spending the 2012 summer league and pre-season with the Washington Wizards, Gray signed with Chorale Roanne of France for the rest of the 2012–13 season on December 16, 2012.

In July 2013, Gray joined the Indiana Pacers for the 2013 NBA Summer League. On August 7, 2013, he signed with Tadamon Zouk of Lebanon for the 2013–14 season. His stint with Tadamon did not last long and later signed with BCM Gravelines for the rest of the season on December 7, 2013.

In July 2014, Gray joined the Cleveland Cavaliers for the 2014 NBA Summer League. Later that month, he signed with JDA Dijon for the 2014–15 season, earning Eurobasket.com All-French Pro A Honorable Mention status that year after leading the league in scoring (16.8 points per game).

On May 21, 2015, Gray signed a two-year deal with BCM Gravelines, returning to the club for a second stint. In July 2015, he joined the Brooklyn Nets for the 2015 NBA Summer League.

On December 5, 2016, Gray left BCM Gravelines and joined Lavrio of the Greek Basket League, replacing Brandon Young on the team's squad. He resigned with Lavrio on October 5, 2017, in order to replace the injured Doron Lamb. On January 28, 2018, he left Lavrio and signed with Croatian club Zadar for the rest of the 2017–18 season. He averaged 19.8 points and 3.1 rebounds per game in Croatia.

Gray signed with Peristeri of the Greek Basket League on July 31, 2018. On June 17, 2019, Gray re-upped his contract with the Greek club for another season. He averaged 12.8 points per game during the 2019–2020 campaign. On June 17, 2020, Gray re-upped his contract with the Greek club for a third consecutive season.

On October 27, 2020, Gray set an all-time Basketball Champions League record after he recorded an efficiency rating of 47. He scored 39 points, making 10-of-13 three-pointers, in a 106–88 away victory over Rytas Vilnius.

On January 15, 2021, Gray amicably parted ways with the Greek club after almost three seasons to sign for the Bosnian Igokea.

On July 19, 2021, Gray signed with Hapoel Holon of the Israeli Basketball Premier League. Hapoel Holon also plays in the Basketball Champions League. He averaged 12.6 points, 2.6 assists and 1.9 rebounds per game in eight games.

On December 10, 2021, Gray returned to Peristeri. In 17 league games, he averaged 8.3 points, 2.5 rebounds, 1.6 assists and 0.8 steals, playing around 23 minutes per contest.

=== The Basketball Tournament (TBT) (2017–present) ===
In the summer of 2017, Gray played in The Basketball Tournament on ESPN for team A Few Good Men (Gonzaga Alumni). He competed for the $2 million prize, and for team A Few Good Men, he averaged 24.7 points per game. Gray helped take team A Few Good Men to the Super 16 round, where they then lost to Team Challenge ALS 77–60.
