= Casey Calvary =

German-born American basketball player

Personal information
- Born: April 27, 1979 (age 47) Würzburg, Germany
- Listed height: 6 ft 8 in (2.03 m)
- Listed weight: 230 lb (104 kg)

Career information
- High school: Bellarmine Prep (Tacoma, Washington)
- College: Gonzaga (1997–2001)
- NBA draft: 2001: undrafted
- Playing career: 2001–2007
- Position: Power forward / center

Career history
- 2001–2002: Isuzu Giga Cats
- 2002–2003: ÉS Chalon-sur-Saône
- 2003–2004: Idaho Stampede
- 2004–2006: Townsville Crocodiles
- 2006: Alta Gestion Fuenlabrada Madrid
- 2006–2007: CB Villa de Los Barrios

Career highlights
- NBL All-Star (2005); All-NBL Third Team (2005); WCC Player of the Year (2001); 2× First-team All-WCC (2000, 2001)

Casey Calvary (born April 27, 1979) is an American former professional basketball player. He played professionally in Japan, the United States, Spain and Australia, including two seasons in the Australian National Basketball League (NBL).

== College career ==
Calvary, a 6'8 forward/center from Bellarmine Preparatory School in Tacoma, Washington, played collegiate basketball at Gonzaga University. Calvary helped lead the Zags to three straight Sweet Sixteen appearances in 1999, 2000 and 2001. Calvary was a starter on all three teams, earning first team All-West Coast Conference honors as a junior and senior and was the WCC player of the year in 2001. In his Gonzaga career, Calvary scored 1,509 points and grabbed 757 rebounds, placing him in the Zags' all-time top ten in both categories at the time of his graduation.

== Professional career ==
Following his Gonzaga career, Calvary was not selected in the 2001 NBA draft. He instead headed to Japan to begin his professional career with the Isuzu Giga Cats. From there, he played in France for ÉS Chalon-sur-Saône and in the U.S. in the Continental Basketball Association's Idaho Stampede. Calvary then played two seasons for the Townsville Crocodiles of the Australian NBL, and was named a league All-Star in 2005. Calvary then spent two years in Spain before retiring in 2008.
