= Blake Stepp =

American basketball player (born 1982)

Personal information
- Born: February 4, 1982 (age 44) Eugene, Oregon, U.S.
- Listed height: 6 ft 4 in (1.93 m)
- Listed weight: 194 lb (88 kg)

Career information
- High school: South Eugene (Eugene, Oregon)
- College: Gonzaga (2000–2004)
- NBA draft: 2004: 2nd round, 58th overall pick
- Drafted by: Minnesota Timberwolves
- Playing career: 2004–2006
- Position: Point guard

Career history
- 2004–2005: Partizan
- 2005–2006: Valencia

Career highlights
- Consensus second-team All-American (2004); 2× WCC Player of the Year (2003, 2004); 2× First-team All-WCC (2003, 2004); WCC Newcomer of the Year (2001); WCC Freshman of the Year (2001)
- Stats at Basketball Reference

Blake Roy Stepp (born February 4, 1982) is an American former professional basketball player. After a standout prep career at South Eugene High School and college career at Gonzaga University, he was drafted in the second round of the 2004 NBA draft by the Minnesota Timberwolves. However, Stepp spent two seasons playing overseas, before retiring due to chronic knee injuries at the age of 24. After his basketball career, Stepp also played poker professionally.

== Basketball career ==
A native of Eugene, Oregon, Stepp attended South Eugene High School where he was named the Gatorade Oregon Player of the Year his senior year.

He played college basketball at Gonzaga University. In his four-year career with the Bulldogs, from 2000 to 2004, Stepp averaged 13.0 points, 5.0 assists, 3.9 rebounds and 1.2 steals. He was named the WCC Player of the Year in 2003 and 2004. In 2012, Stepp was inducted into the WCC Hall of Fame.

In the 2004 NBA draft, Stepp was selected in the second round with the 58th overall pick by the Minnesota Timberwolves. Stepp appeared in a handful of preseason games with the Wolves, but did not manage to make the final cut. Near the end of 2004, Stepp joined Partizan of Serbia and Montenegro, spending there the rest of the 2004–05 season. After playing for the Cleveland Cavaliers during the NBA Summer League, Stepp spent the 2005–06 season with Valencia in Spain.

Stepp had represented the United States at the 2003 Pan American Games.

In the summer of 2017, Stepp played in The Basketball Tournament on ESPN for team A Few Good Men (Gonzaga Alumni). He competed for the $2 million prize, and for team A Few Good Men, he averaged 10.5 points per game. Stepp helped take team A Few Good Men to the Super 16 round, where they then lost to Team Challenge ALS 77–60.

== Poker career ==
Upon his retirement from basketball, Stepp became a professional poker player, competing at the 2008, 2009 and 2010 World Series of Poker.
