= Matt Santangelo =

American-Italian basketball player

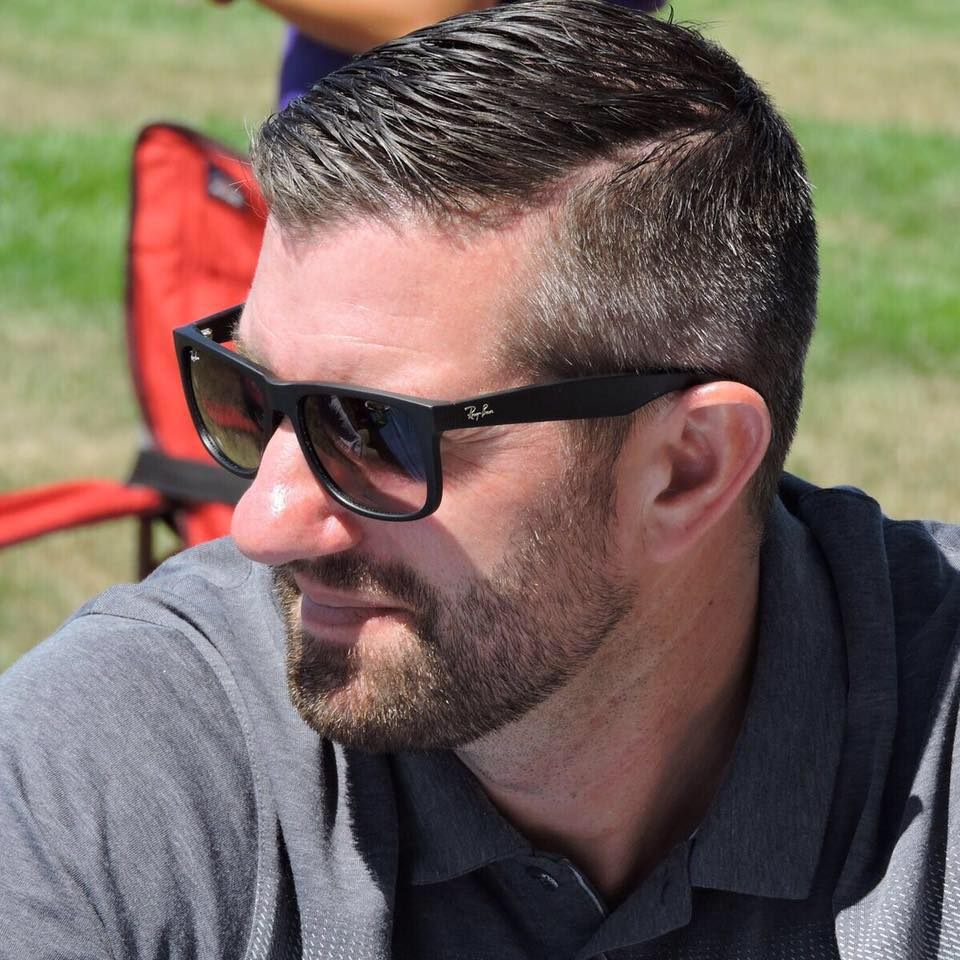

Personal information
- Born: September 8, 1977 (age 49) Portland, Oregon, U.S.
- Listed height: 6 ft 1 in (1.85 m)
- Listed weight: 176 lb (80 kg)

Career information
- High school: Central Catholic (Portland, Oregon)
- College: Gonzaga (1996–2000)
- NBA draft: 2000: undrafted
- Playing career: 2000–2006
- Position: Point guard

Career history
- 2000: Iraklis Thessaloniki
- 2000–2001: Pallacanestro Cantù
- 2001–2002: WTK Anwil Włocławek
- 2002–2005: Caja San Fernando
- 2005–2006: AMG Sebastiani Basket Rieti
- 2006: Benetton Treviso

Career highlights
- Italian League champion (2006); 3× First-team All-WCC (1998–2000); WCC co-Freshman of the Year (1997)
Medals
Men's basketball
Representing United States
Summer Universiade
Gold medal – first place	1999 Palma	National Team

Matthew William Santangelo (born September 8, 1977) is an American–Italian former professional basketball player. He played college basketball at Gonzaga University.

With the USA men's basketball team he won a gold medal at the 1999 World University Games in Palma de Mallorca, Spain.
