= Anton Watson =

American basketball player (born 2000)

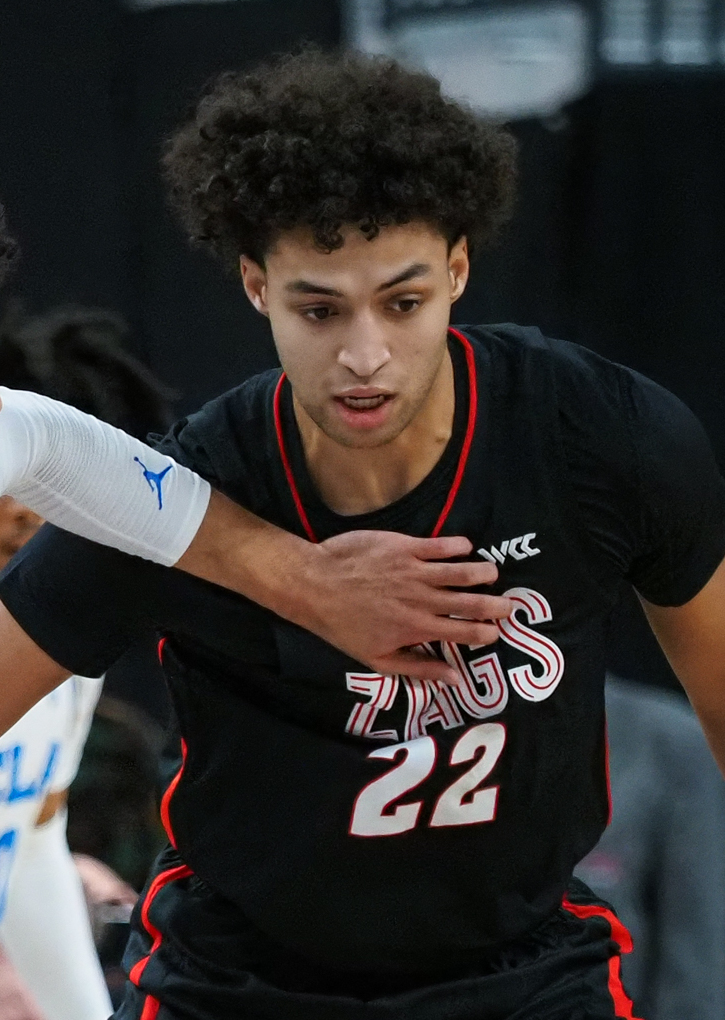
- Watson with Gonzaga in 2021

No. 22 – Coachella Valley Lakers
- Position: Power forward / small forward
- League: NBA G League

Personal information
- Born: October 6, 2000 (age 26) Coeur d'Alene, Idaho, U.S.
- Listed height: 6 ft 8 in (2.03 m)
- Listed weight: 225 lb (102 kg)

Career information
- High school: Gonzaga Prep (Spokane, Washington)
- College: Gonzaga (2019–2024)
- NBA draft: 2024: 2nd round, 54th overall pick
- Drafted by: Boston Celtics
- Playing career: 2024–present

Career history
- 2024–2025: Maine Celtics
- 2025: New York Knicks
- 2025–present: South Bay / Coachella Valley Lakers

Career highlights
- First-team All-WCC (2024); Washington Mr. Basketball (2019)
- Stats at NBA.com
- Stats at Basketball Reference

Anton Michael Watson (born October 6, 2000) is an American professional basketball player for the Coachella Valley Lakers of the NBA G League. He played college basketball for the Gonzaga Bulldogs.

== High school career ==
Watson played basketball for four years at Gonzaga Preparatory School in Spokane, Washington. In his sophomore season, he averaged 19 points per game and was named most valuable player (MVP) of the Greater Spokane League. Watson led his team to a league championship and a third-place finish at the Washington Class 4A state tournament. As a junior, he averaged 23 points, 11 rebounds and five assists per game and won the Class 4A state title while earning tournament MVP honors. Watson was selected to the USA Today All-USA Washington first team. In his senior season, he averaged 21.6 points, 7.1 rebounds and 3.8 assists per game, helped Gonzaga Prep win a second consecutive 4A state championship. He was the unanimous MVP of the state tournament and recognized as Associated Press 4A Player of the Year and Washington Mr. Basketball. On June 21, 2017, before his junior season, Watson committed to play college basketball for Gonzaga. He had also been in contact with Idaho, Washington and Washington State. Watson was considered a four-star recruit and the second-best player in the 2019 class from Washington.

== College career ==
On November 5, 2019, Watson debuted for Gonzaga, recording seven points, five rebounds and four assists in a win over Alabama State. He had 15 points in a win over North Dakota on November 12. Watson started four games with Killian Tillie recovering from knee surgery. On January 16, 2020, it was announced that Watson would undergo shoulder surgery and miss the remainder of the season. He averaged 4.9 points and 3.1 rebounds in 15 games.

== Professional career ==
=== Maine Celtics (2024–2025) ===
On June 27, 2024, Watson was selected with the 54th overall pick by the Boston Celtics in 2024 NBA draft and on August 2, he signed a two-way contract with them.

On March 2, 2025, Watson was waived by the Celtics.

=== New York Knicks (2025) ===
On March 4, 2025, Watson was claimed off waivers by the New York Knicks. In nine appearances for the Knicks, he averaged 0.9 points, 0.3 rebounds, and 0.2 assists.

=== South Bay / Coachella Valley Lakers (2025–present) ===
On September 27, 2025, Watson signed with the Los Angeles Lakers. He was waived prior to the start of the regular season on October 18.

On September 17, 2026, Watson signed an Exhibit 10 contract with the Lakers. He was waived by Los Angeles the following day.

== Career statistics ==
Legend
GP	Games played	GS	Games started	MPG	Minutes per game
FG%	Field goal percentage	3P%	3-point field goal percentage	FT%	Free throw percentage
RPG	Rebounds per game	APG	Assists per game	SPG	Steals per game
BPG	Blocks per game	PPG	Points per game	**Bold**	Career high

=== NBA ===
Year	Team	GP	GS	MPG	FG%	3P%	FT%	RPG	APG	SPG	BPG	PPG
2024–25	New York	9	0	2.4	.444	.000	–	.3	.2	.1	.0	.9
Career		9	0	2.4	.444	.000	–	.3	.2	.1	.0	.9

=== College ===
Year	Team	GP	GS	MPG	FG%	3P%	FT%	RPG	APG	SPG	BPG	PPG
2019–20	Gonzaga	15	5	14.7	.538	.111	.571	3.1	1.5	1.2	.5	4.9
2020–21	Gonzaga	32	17	18.9	**.631**	.150	.650	3.3	1.2	1.2	.6	6.9
2021–22	Gonzaga	32	0	18.1	.538	.227	**.698**	4.7	1.9	1.3	.3	7.3
2022–23	Gonzaga	**37**	**37**	29.1	.608	.333	.548	6.2	2.4	**1.8**	**.7**	11.1
2023–24	Gonzaga	35	35	**31.3**	.578	**.412**	.653	**7.1**	**2.6**	1.5	**.7**	**14.5**
Career		151	94	23.7	.586	.307	.627	5.2	2.0	1.4	.6	9.6

== Personal life ==
Watson's father, Deon Sr., played college basketball at Idaho (1990–94), holds the Vandal record for career rebounds (877), and played professionally in Europe and South America. Older brother Deon Jr. played college football at their father's alma mater (2013–16) as a tight end and wide receiver, and sister Haile played volleyball at Eastern Washington (2015) and Fresno State (2016–18).
