= Richie Frahm =

American basketball player (born 1977)

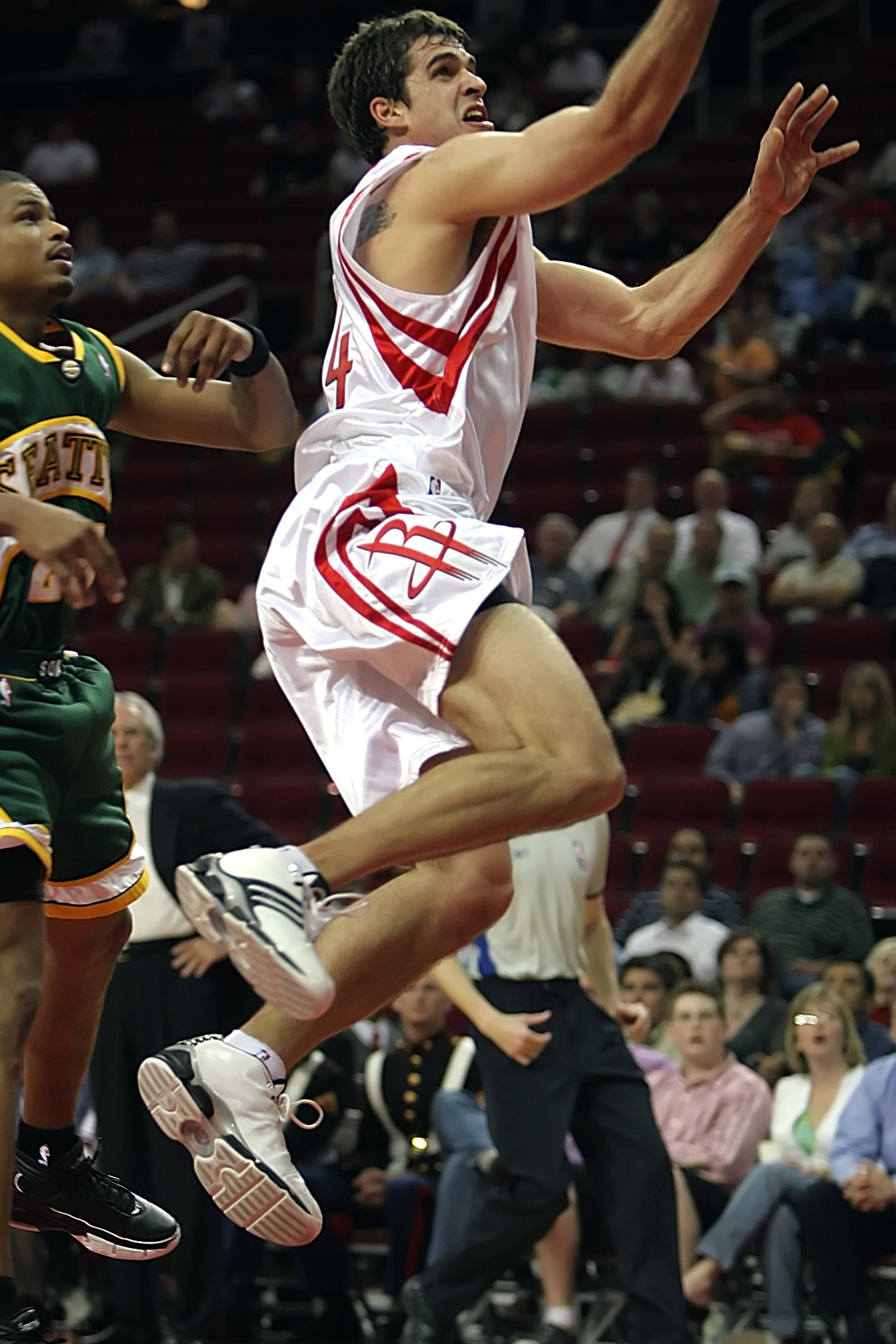
- Frahm with the Houston Rockets in 2006

Personal information
- Born: August 14, 1977 (age 49) Battle Ground, Washington, U.S.
- Listed height: 6 ft 5 in (1.96 m)
- Listed weight: 210 lb (95 kg)

Career information
- High school: Battle Ground (Battle Ground, Washington)
- College: Gonzaga (1996–2000)
- NBA draft: 2000: undrafted
- Playing career: 2001–2011
- Position: Shooting guard
- Number: 24, 14

Career history
- 2001–2002: Phoenix Eclipse
- 2002: Talk 'N Text Tropang Texters
- 2002–2003: Darüşşafaka
- 2003–2004: Seattle SuperSonics
- 2004–2005: Portland Trail Blazers
- 2005–2006: Minnesota Timberwolves
- 2006: Houston Rockets
- 2006: Benetton Treviso
- 2007–2008: Los Angeles Clippers
- 2009: Reno Bighorns
- 2009–2010: Antalya BŞB
- 2010: Reno Bighorns
- 2010–2011: Aisin Seahorses

Career highlights
- 2× First-team All-WCC (1999, 2000)
- Stats at NBA.com
- Stats at Basketball Reference

Richard Anthony Frahm (born August 14, 1977) is an American former professional basketball player. He competed in the NCAA 3-point shootout his senior year, winning the men's division but was beaten by Jenny Cafferty of Rice.

After he went undrafted following a college career at Gonzaga University and brief overseas stints, among others in the Philippine Basketball Association, and in Turkey, the 6-foot-5-inch (1.96 m) shooting guard signed with the Seattle SuperSonics in 2003, where he played one season, averaging 3.4 points and one rebound per game.

He was then made available in the 2004 expansion draft, where he was selected by the Charlotte Bobcats, but later waived. He was then signed by the Portland Trail Blazers for the 2004–05 season for whom he averaged 3.8 points and 1.4 rebounds per game.

Frahm joined the Minnesota Timberwolves for the 2005–06 season. He scored 18 points on the season opener against Portland, his former team, but saw very limited action after. The Timberwolves waived him on March 16, 2006. The Houston Rockets claimed Frahm off waivers on March 20.

After playing the 2006–07 season in Italy with Benetton Treviso, he was signed by the Phoenix Suns for the 2007–08 preseason but was waived on late October 2007 after playing two preseason games.

Frahm was signed by the Los Angeles Clippers in December 2007. He was waived on January 7, 2008. Frahm played a total of 140 games in the NBA with career averages of 3.6 points, and 1.2 rebounds. His final NBA game was played on January 6, 2008, in an 82 - 88 loss to the San Antonio Spurs where he recorded 2 points and 1 rebound.

Frahm was acquired by the NBA D-League Reno Bighorns in February 2009.

In 2010, Frahm signed with Japan's Aisin Seahorses.
