= Derek Raivio =

American basketball player

Personal information
- Born: November 9, 1984 (age 42) Vancouver, Washington
- Listed height: 6 ft 2 in (1.88 m)
- Listed weight: 180 lb (82 kg)

Career information
- High school: Mountain View (Vancouver, Washington)
- College: Gonzaga (2003–2007)
- NBA draft: 2007: undrafted
- Playing career: 2007–2017
- Position: Guard

Career history
- 2007–2008: Köln 99ers
- 2008–2010: TBB Trier
- 2010–2011: Erie BayHawks
- 2011: Fort Wayne Mad Ants
- 2011–2012: Shinshu Brave Warriors
- 2012–2014: Okapi Aalstar
- 2014–2015: ČEZ Nymburk
- 2015–2016: SLUC Nancy
- 2016–2017: Benfica

Career highlights
- LPB champion (2017); BLB Star of the Coaches (2013); BLB scoring champion (2014); WCC co-Player of the Year (2007); 2× First-team All-WCC (2005, 2007)

Derek Raivio (born November 9, 1984) is an American former professional basketball player who last played for Benfica of the Portuguese Basketball League.

== College career ==
Raivio played for four seasons at Gonzaga University under coach Mark Few from 2003 to 2007. Prior to Gonzaga, Raivio played for Mountain View High School in Vancouver. Raivio set both season and career school records, scoring 1,568 points.

At Gonzaga he was named co-West Coast Conference Player of the Year his senior season. Raivio was named West Coast Conference Co-Player of the Year as a senior, sharing the honor with Sean Denison of Santa Clara. He finished his collegiate career as the second all-time career free throw shooting percentage leader in NCAA Division I history (.927). He finished his career at Gonzaga as the school's 12th all-time leading scorer. He was also second all-time in steals, fourth in assists, and fourth in three-point field goals made at the end of his Gonzaga career.

== Professional career ==
In 2007, Raivio signed with the Basketball Bundesliga's TBB Trier. In 2010, he signed with the Erie Bayhawks of the NBA D-League. He split the season between the Bayhawks and the Fort Wayne Mad Ants. He played the 2011–12 season in Japan for the expansion Shinshu Brave Warriors. In 2012, Raivio signed with Okapi Aalstar of the Ethias League of Belgium. Raivio had an excellent season with Okapi, as he led the league in points (18.7 per game) and index rating (20.7 per game). He led the no. 5 seeded team to a surprising Finals berth, in which Okapi eventually lost 3–2 to Telenet Oostende.

On June 25, 2014, Raivio signed a deal with ČEZ Nymburk, a team based in Nymburk, Czech Republic and plays in the Eurocup.

On July 11, 2015, he signed with the French club SLUC Nancy Basket.

On August 16, 2016, Raivio signed with Portuguese club Benfica.
