= Matt Bouldin =

American basketball player (born 1988)

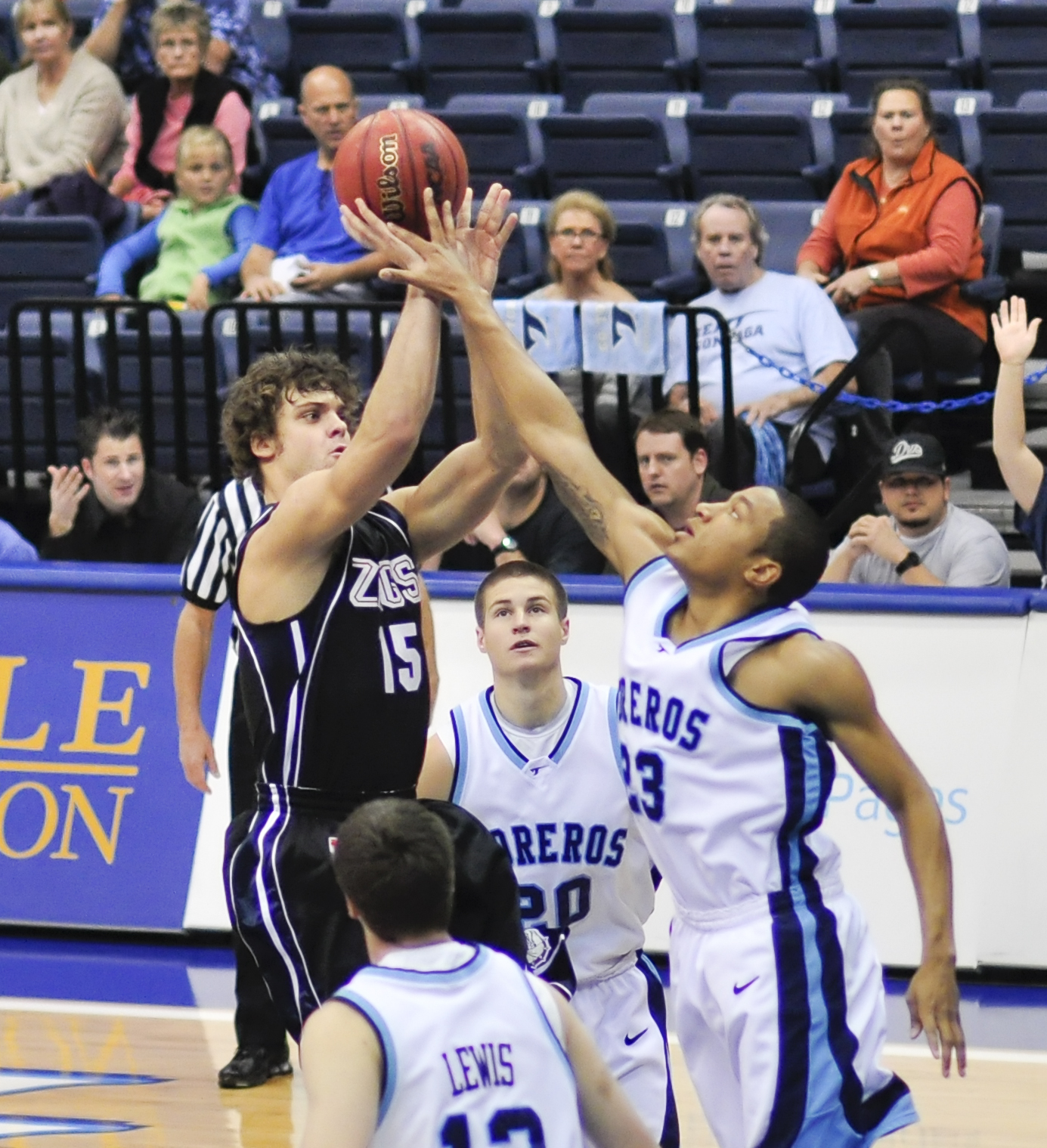
- Bouldin playing for Gonzaga University

Personal information
- Born: January 17, 1988 (age 38) Denver, Colorado, U.S.
- Listed height: 6 ft 5 in (1.96 m)
- Listed weight: 215 lb (98 kg)

Career information
- High school: ThunderRidge (Highlands Ranch, Colorado)
- College: Gonzaga (2006–2010)
- NBA draft: 2010: undrafted
- Playing career: 2010–2017
- Position: Shooting guard

Career history
- 2010–2011: Iraklis Thessaloniki
- 2011: Tulsa 66ers
- 2011–2012: Budućnost Podgorica
- 2012: Hapoel Tel Aviv
- 2013: Los Angeles D-Fenders
- 2013–2014: Delaware 87ers
- 2014–2015: Fort Wayne Mad Ants
- 2015: Changwon LG Sakers
- 2016–2017: Busan KT Sonicboom

Career highlights
- NBA D-League champion (2014); NBA D-League Finals MVP (2014); MBL champion (2012); WCC Player of the Year (2010); 3× First-team All-WCC (2008–2010); WCC All-Freshman Team (2007); Mr. Colorado Basketball (2006)
Medals
Men's basketball
Representing United States
FIBA U19 World Championship
Silver medal – second place	2007 Novi Sad	Team competition

Matthew Timothy Bouldin (born January 17, 1988) is an American former professional basketball player. He played college basketball for Gonzaga University.

== High school career ==
Bouldin attended ThunderRidge High School in Highlands Ranch, Colorado. In his senior year (2005–06), Bouldin averaged 25.4 ppg, 6.4 rpg and 4.8 assists per game. Bouldin was named the Colorado State Player of the Year as a senior.

== College career ==
Bouldin was named to the 2007 West Coast Conference All-Freshman team at Gonzaga. Following his initial campaign, he played for the silver medalist Team USA in the 2007 FIBA U19 World Championship in Novi Sad, Serbia.

Returning to Gonzaga, Bouldin led the Zags to three straight West Coast Conference titles, making first team All-Conference each time. Bouldin increased his scoring and rebounding averages in each of his four years and led Gonzaga to a Sweet 16 berth in the 2009 NCAA tournament.

Entering his senior year, Bouldin was named to the watch list for several major awards, including the John R. Wooden Award, the Naismith College Player of the Year, the Lowe's Senior CLASS Award and the Bob Cousy Award. After a strong individual season and in leading Gonzaga to a fourth straight WCC title, Bouldin was named the West Coast Conference Men's Basketball Player of the Year.

== Professional career ==
After going undrafted in the 2010 NBA draft, Bouldin joined the Chicago Bulls for the 2010 NBA Summer League. In October 2010, Bouldin signed for Iraklis Thessaloniki in the Greek League. He was released from the team, after tested positive in a WADA banned substance. He appeared in 10 games for the club averaging 9.7 points, 3.0 rebounds and 1.4 assists per game. In March 2011, he was acquired by the Tulsa 66ers. During the 2011–12 season, Bouldin played for KK Budućnost Podgorica of the Adriatic League.

In September 2012, Bouldin signed with Hapoel Tel Aviv of the Israeli Basketball Super League for whom he played only one game for before being released due to injury on October 12 (his teammate's birthday).

In November 2013, he was acquired by the Los Angeles D-Fenders. On December 19, 2013, he was waived by the D-Fenders. On December 27, he was acquired by the Delaware 87ers. On February 14, 2014, he was traded to the Fort Wayne Mad Ants. On April 26, 2014, the Mad Ants claimed their first D-League championship as they defeated the Santa Cruz Warriors 2 games to 0. Along with his first D-League championship, Bouldin received the Finals Co-MVP award along with teammate Ron Howard.

In July 2014, he joined the Orlando Magic for the 2014 NBA Summer League, but did not appear in a game for them. On March 3, 2015, he was reacquired by the Fort Wayne Mad Ants.

In July 2015, Bouldin joined the NBA D-League Select Team for the 2015 NBA Summer League and was selected by the Changwon LG Sakers with the 13th overall pick in the 2015 Korean Basketball League draft.

On December 18, 2016, Bouldin signed with Busan KT Sonicboom.

On December 15, 2018, Bouldin won the Red Rocks Sports Holiday Hoop Fest Championship.

== The Basketball Tournament ==
Matt Bouldin played for Team A Few Good Men in the 2018 edition of The Basketball Tournament. In two games, he averaged 11.0 points per game, four rebounds per game and two assists per game. A Few Good Men made it to the Second Round before falling to Team Gael Force.
