= Saint Mary's Gaels men's basketball statistical leaders =

The Saint Mary's Gaels men's basketball statistical leaders are individual statistical leaders of the Saint Mary's Gaels men's basketball program in various categories, including points, three-pointers, assists, blocks, rebounds, and steals. Within those areas, the lists identify single-game, single-season, and career leaders. The Gaels represent Saint Mary's College in the NCAA's West Coast Conference.

Saint Mary's began competing in intercollegiate basketball in 1907. However, the school's record book does not generally list records from before the 1950s, as records from before this period are often incomplete and inconsistent. Since scoring was much lower in this era, and teams played much fewer games during a typical season, it is likely that few or no players from this era would appear on these lists anyway.

The NCAA did not officially record assists as a stat until the 1983–84 season, and blocks and steals until the 1985–86 season, but Saint Mary's record books includes players in these stats before these seasons. These lists are updated through the end of the 2022–23 season.

== Scoring ==
Career
Rk	Player	Points	Seasons
1	Matthew Dellavedova	1,933	2009–10 2010–11 2011–12 2012–13
2	Jordan Ford	1,929	2016–17 2017–18 2018–19 2019–20
3	Daniel Kickert	1,874	2002–03 2003–04 2004–05 2005–06
4	Omar Samhan	1,848	2006–07 2007–08 2008–09 2009–10
5	Brad Waldow	1,743	2011–12 2012–13 2013–14 2014–15
6	David Vann	1,738	1978–79 1979–80 1980–81 1981–82
7	Jock Landale	1,658	2014–15 2015–16 2016–17 2017–18
8	Diamon Simpson	1,603	2005–06 2006–07 2007–08 2008–09
9	Robert Haugen	1,502	1985–86 1986–87 1987–88 1988–89
10	Peter Thibeaux	1,490	1979–80 1980–81 1981–82 1982–83

Season
Rk	Player	Points	Season
1	Jock Landale	761	2017–18
2	Jordan Ford	743	2019–20
3	Omar Samhan	724	2009–10
4	Jordan Ford	716	2018–19
5	Eric Schraeder	614	1998–99
6	Paulius Murauskas	606	2025–26
7	Steve Gray	595	1962–63
8	Brad Waldow	590	2014–15
9	Jock Landale	576	2016–17
10	Daniel Kickert	564	2004–05

Single game
Rk	Player	Points	Season	Opponent
1	Jim Moore	43	1964–65	Sacramento State
2	Jordan Ford	42	2019–20	Pepperdine
3	Paul Marigney	40	2003–04	Pepperdine
	Odell Johnson	40	1955–56	Pepperdine
5	Peter Thibeaux	39	1982–83	Southern Utah
6	Sam Hill	38	1970–71	UNLV
7	Patrick Mills	37	2007–08	Oregon
	Mike Rozenski	37	1972–73	California
	Mike Wadsworth	37	1955–56	Pacific
	Robert Haugen	37	1988–89	Loyola Marymount
	Eric Bamberger	37	1988–89	San Francisco
	Jock Landale	37	2017–18	Sacramento State

== Rebounds ==
Career
Rk	Player	Rebounds	Seasons
1	Diamon Simpson	1,130	2005–06 2006–07 2007–08 2008–09
2	Omar Samhan	1,107	2006–07 2007–08 2008–09 2009–10
3	Mitchell Saxen	926	2020-21 2021-22 2022-23 2023-24 2024-25
4	Tom Meschery	916	1958–59 1959–60 1960–61
5	Brad Waldow	900	2011–12 2012–13 2013–14 2014–15
6	Jock Landale	843	2014–15 2015–16 2016–17 2017–18
7	Jim Moore	749	1962–63 1963–64 1964–65
8	Herman Brown	748	1970–71 1971–72 1972–73 1973–74
9	Steve Gray	745	1960–61 1961–62 1962–63
10	Robert Haugen	730	1985–86 1986–87 1987–88 1988–89

Season
Rk	Player	Rebounds	Season
1	Diamon Simpson	377	2008–09
2	Omar Samhan	369	2009–10
3	Jock Landale	367	2017–18
4	Rob Jones	357	2011–12
5	Bob Turner	351	1964–65
6	Tom Meschery	339	1960–61
7	Omar Samhan	328	2008–09
8	Jock Landale	322	2016–17
9	Herman Brown	316	1970–71
10	Tom Meschery	313	1959–60

Single game
Rk	Player	Rebounds	Season	Opponent
1	Mike Wadsworth	24	1953–54	UC Davis
2	Tom Meschery	22	1959–60	San Francisco
	Steve Gray	22	1961–62	San Francisco
4	Tom Meschery	21	1960–61	Pacific
	Steve Gray	21	1962–63	Marquette
	Jim Moore	21	1964–65	Loyola (Los Angeles)
7	LaRoy Doss	20	1958–59	UCLA
	Craig Cassault	20	1972–73	Loyola (Los Angeles)
	Kenny Jones	20	1978–79	Santa Clara

== Assists ==
Career
Rk	Player	Assists	Seasons
1	Emmett Naar	816	2014–15 2015–16 2016–17 2017–18
2	Matthew Dellavedova	768	2009–10 2010–11 2011–12 2012–13
3	Kamran Sufi	507	1993–94 1994–95 1995–96 1996–97
4	Augustas Marčiulionis	504	2021–22 2022–23 2023–24 2024–25
5	David Carter	498	1985–86 1986–87 1987–88 1988–89
6	Tommy Kuhse	477	2017–18 2018–19 2019–20 2020–21 2021–22
7	Mickey McConnell	476	2007–08 2008–09 2009–10 2010–11
8	Nick Pappageorge	408	1976–77 1977–78
9	Joe Rahon	381	2015–16 2016–17
10	Frank Allocco	372	1996–97 1997–98 1998–99 1999–00

Season
Rk	Player	Assists	Season
1	Emmett Naar	284	2017–18
2	Emmett Naar	223	2015–16
	Matthew Dellavedova	223	2012–13
4	Nick Pappageorge	213	1976–77
5	Matthew Dellavedova	212	2011–12
6	Augustas Marčiulionis	208	2024–25
7	Mickey McConnell	204	2010–11
8	Matthew Dellavedova	200	2010–11
9	Allen Caveness	198	1990–91
10	Nick Pappageorge	195	1977–78

Single game
Rk	Player	Assists	Season	Opponent
1	Ray Orgill	16	1980–81	Southern Utah

== Steals ==
Career
Rk	Player	Steals	Seasons
1	Diamon Simpson	174	2005–06 2006–07 2007–08 2008–09
2	Stephen Holt	173	2010–11 2011–12 2012–13 2013–14
3	Kamran Sufi	162	1993–94 1994–95 1995–96 1996–97
4	Logan Johnson	151	2019–20 2020–21 2021–22 2022–23
5	Matthew Dellavedova	150	2009–10 2010–11 2011–12 2012–13
6	Augustas Marčiulionis	144	2021–22 2022–23 2023–24 2024–25
7	Chase Poole	134	2000–01 2001–02 2002–03 2003–04
8	David Carter	130	1985–86 1986–87 1987–88 1988–89
9	Erick Newman	126	1987–88 1988–89
10	Jordan Ford	124	2016–17 2017–18 2018–19 2019–20

Season
Rk	Player	Steals	Season
1	Erick Newman	72	1988–89
2	Logan Johnson	67	2021–22
3	Stephen Holt	61	2010–11
	Diamon Simpson	61	2008–09
5	Patrick Mills	57	2008–09
	Patrick Mills	57	2007–08
7	Allen Caveness	56	1990–91
	Kamran Sufi	56	1994–95
9	Logan Johnson	55	2022–23
10	E.J. Rowland	54	2004–05
	Erick Newman	54	1987–88

Single game
Rk	Player	Steals	Season	Opponent
1	Stephen Holt	9	2010–11	College of Idaho

== Blocks ==
Career
Rk	Player	Blocks	Seasons
1	Omar Samhan	258	2006–07 2007–08 2008–09 2009–10
2	Diamon Simpson	239	2005–06 2006–07 2007–08 2008–09
3	Mitchell Saxen	156	2020-21 2021-22 2022-23 2023-24 2024-25
4	Brad Millard	153	1995–96 1996–97 1997–98 1998–99 1999–00
5	Brad Waldow	133	2011–12 2012–13 2013–14 2014–15
6	Dane Pineau	112	2013–14 2014–15 2015–16 2016–17
7	Jock Landale	94	2014–15 2015–16 2016–17 2017–18
8	Peter Thibeaux	91	1979–80 1980–81 1981–82 1982–83
	Chase Poole	91	2000–01 2001–02 2002–03 2003–04
10	Harry Wessels	89	2022–23 2023–24 2024–25 2025–26

Season
Rk	Player	Blocks	Season
1	Omar Samhan	99	2009–10
2	Brad Millard	92	1996–97
3	Diamon Simpson	79	2006–07
4	Omar Samhan	69	2008–09
5	Diamon Simpson	58	2007–08
6	Diamon Simpson	57	2008–09
7	Dane Pineau	51	2015–16
8	Omar Samhan	47	2006–07
	Jordan Hunter	47	2018–19
10	Brad Waldow	46	2013–14

Single game
Rk	Player	Blocks	Season	Opponent
1	Omar Samhan	9	2009–10	Howard
	Brad Millard	9	1999–00	Colorado
