= Drew Timme =

American basketball player (born 2000)

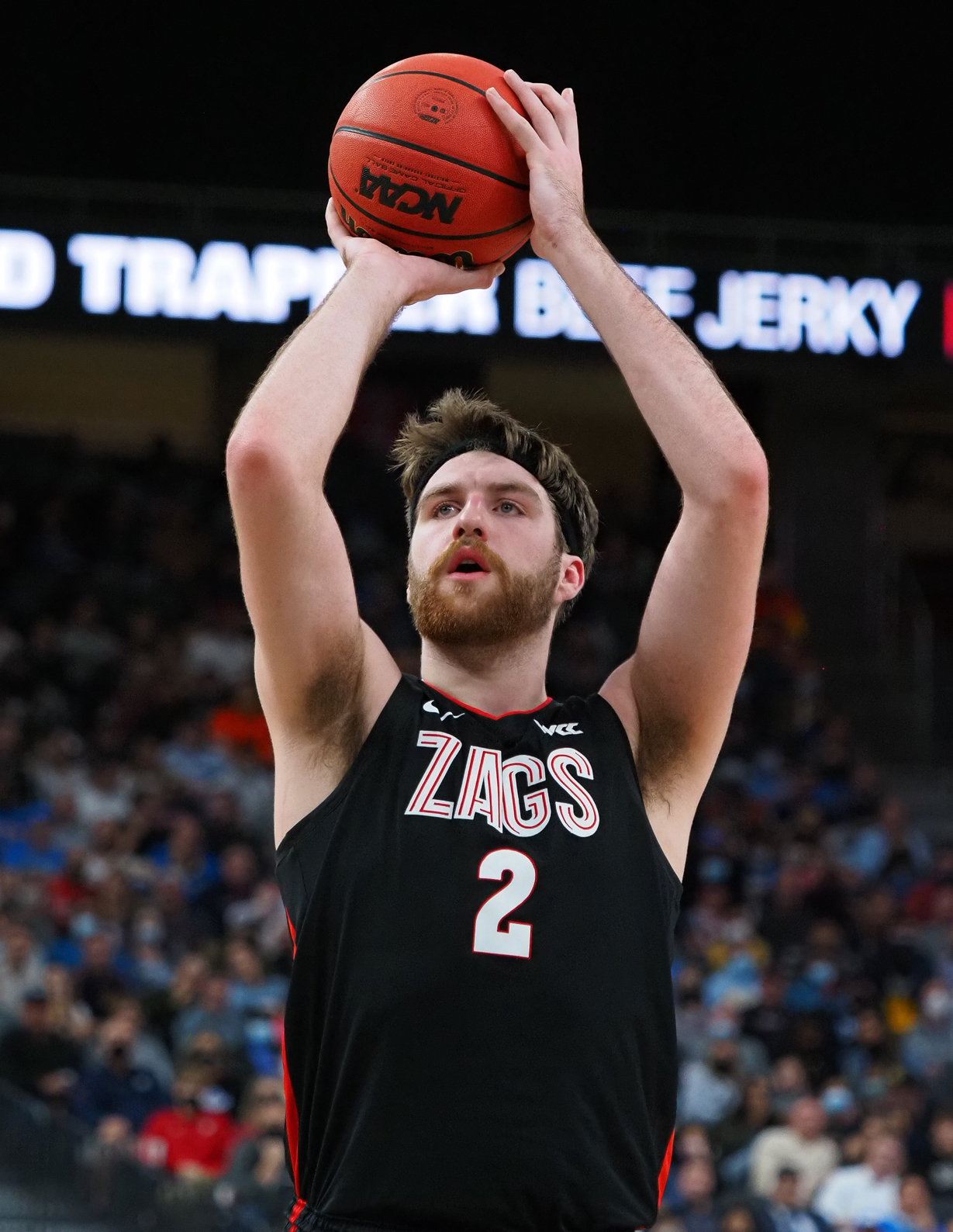
- Timme with Gonzaga in 2021

No. 2 – Phoenix Suns
- Position: Power forward
- League: NBA

Personal information
- Born: September 9, 2000 (age 26) Richardson, Texas, U.S.
- Listed height: 6 ft 9 in (2.06 m)
- Listed weight: 235 lb (107 kg)

Career information
- High school: J. J. Pearce (Richardson, Texas)
- College: Gonzaga (2019–2023)
- NBA draft: 2023: undrafted
- Playing career: 2023–present

Career history
- 2023–2024: Wisconsin Herd
- 2024: Stockton Kings
- 2024–2025: Long Island Nets
- 2025: Brooklyn Nets
- 2025: South Bay Lakers
- 2025–2026: Los Angeles Lakers
- 2025–2026: →South Bay Lakers
- 2026–present: Phoenix Suns
- 2026–present: →Valley Suns

Career highlights
- 2× All-NBA G League Second Team (2025, 2026); Consensus first-team All-American (2023); 2× Consensus second-team All-American (2021, 2022); Karl Malone Award (2021); 2× WCC Player of the Year (2022, 2023); 3× First-team All-WCC (2021–2023); WCC tournament MOP (2023); WCC All-Freshman Team (2020)
- Stats at NBA.com
- Stats at Basketball Reference

Andrew Matthew Timme (/ˈtɪmi/ TIM-MEE; born September 9, 2000) is an American professional basketball player for the Phoenix Suns of the National Basketball Association (NBA), on a two-way contract with the Valley Suns of the NBA G League. He played college basketball for the Gonzaga Bulldogs, where he was a three-time consensus All-American selection, including first-team honors as a senior in 2023. Timme was twice voted the WCC Player of the Year and ended his career as Gonzaga's all-time leading scorer.

== Early life ==
Timme grew up in the north Dallas suburb of Richardson, Texas, and attended J. J. Pearce High School. As a junior, he averaged 27.7 points, 17.9 rebounds and 4.3 assists and was named the District 8-6A Most Valuable Player and second-team All-State by USA Today. Timme was consensus top-50 prospect in the 2019 class among major recruiting services. He committed to playing college basketball for Gonzaga in November of his senior year after considering offers from Texas A&M, Texas, Michigan State, Illinois, Arizona and Alabama.

== College career ==
Timme spent most of his true freshman season as a key reserve for the Bulldogs, occasionally starting. Timme was named to the WCC All-Freshman team. Timme scored a season-high 20 points in a 90–60 win over Saint Mary's on February 8, 2020. He tied for the team lead with 17 points scored in the Bulldogs' 2020 WCC tournament championship game win over Saint Mary's. Timme averaged 9.8 points and 5.4 rebounds per game, shooting a team-high 61.8 percent from the field.

Coming into his sophomore season, Timme was named to the Preseason All-WCC team as well as the watchlist for the Karl Malone Award. On November 27, 2020, he had 28 points and 10 rebounds in a 90–67 win against Auburn. Timme averaged 19.0 points, 7.0 rebounds and 2.3 assists per game, helping lead Gonzaga to the title game. He earned first-team All-WCC honors as well as winning the Karl Malone Award and was a consensus second-team All-America selection.

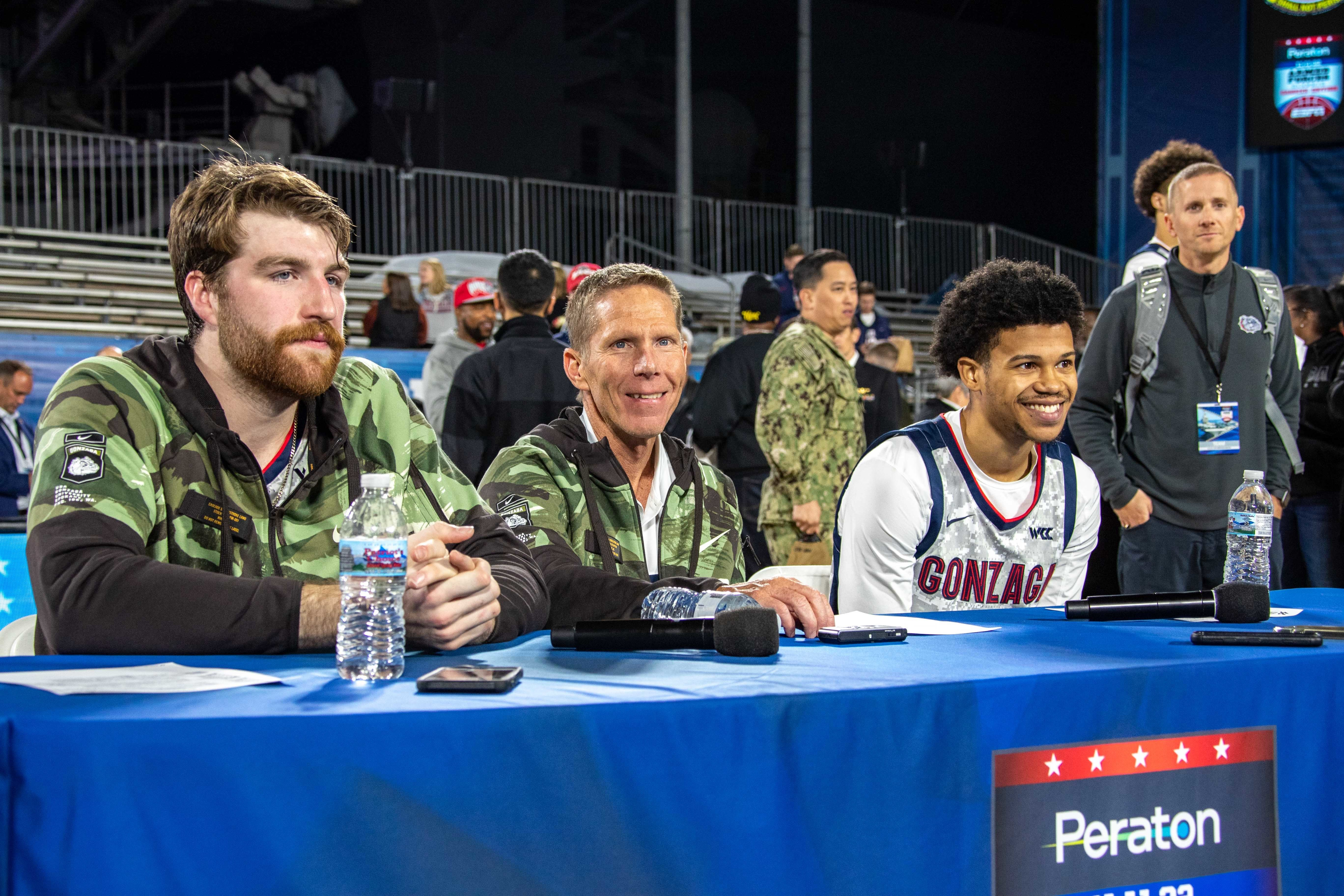
Timme at a press conference aboard the USS Abraham Lincoln hosting the 2022 ESPN Armed Forces Classic – Carrier Edition.

On November 13, 2021, Timme scored a then-career-high 37 points and added seven rebounds and three assists in an 86–74 win against then fifth-ranked Texas. On the season, he averaged 18.4 points, 6.8 rebounds, and 2.8 assists over 32 games. At the close of the regular season, Timme was named WCC Player of the Year and repeated as a consensus second-team All-American. After the season he entered his name into the 2022 NBA draft, but ultimately withdrew in order to return to Gonzaga for his senior season.

Timme entered his senior season as a unanimous preseason All-American selection. He set a new career high with 38 points in a 99–90 win over Pacific on January 21, 2023. Timme scored his 2,000th career point during a 15-point performance on February 3, 2023, in a 88–70 win over Santa Clara. Timme was named the Co-WCC Player of the Year, sharing the award with Brandin Podziemski of Santa Clara. He was the first player to repeat as WCC Player of the Year since Blake Stepp won it in 2003 and 2004. Timme was also named a consensus first-team All-American. On March 7, Timme passed Frank Burgess's career scoring record of 2,196 points, which had been set in 1961, with 18 points in the Bulldogs' 77–51 win over Saint Mary's in the West Coast Conference tournament championship game. He was also named the tournament's Most Outstanding Player.

Timme averaged career highs of 21.2 points, 7.5 rebounds, and 3.2 assists per game during his senior season. At the end of the 2022–23 regular season, he told media on more than one occasion that he planned to leave Gonzaga for the professional ranks after the NCAA tournament, choosing not to take advantage of the NCAA eligibility waiver granted to all basketball players active in the COVID-affected 2020–21 season. He finished his college career with 2,307 points scored and 896 rebounds, which is fourth in school history, and 115 blocked shots, which is eighth. Timme scored 301 points over 13 NCAA tournament games, which is the sixth most in tournament history.

== Professional career ==
=== Wisconsin Herd (2023–2024) ===
After going undrafted in the 2023 NBA draft, Timme joined the Milwaukee Bucks for the 2023 NBA Summer League, signing with them on October 2, 2023. However, he was waived on October 18 and twelve days later, he joined the Wisconsin Herd, for whom he averaged 9.0 points, 6.3 rebounds, and 1.7 assists in 12 games until he underwent season-ending surgery on February 1, 2024, after suffering a left foot fracture.

=== Stockton Kings (2024) ===
On October 18, 2024, Timme signed with the Sacramento Kings, but was waived that day. On October 27, he joined the Stockton Kings.

=== Long Island Nets (2024–2025) ===
On December 30, 2024, Timme was traded to the Long Island Nets. Timme played 29 games for Long Island, averaging 23.9 points, 10.3 rebounds and 4.1 assists per game.

Drew Timme was named NBA G League Player of the Week for games played Monday, March 17, through Sunday, March 23. Over three games during this span he averaged 35.7 points, 12.7 rebounds, 2.0 assists and 2.0 steals in 35.7 minutes per game while shooting 68.4 percent (39-of-57) from the field and 63.6 percent (7-of-11) from 3-point range.

On March 22nd, 2024 he posted a G-League career-high 50 points on 80.8 percent (21-of-26) shooting from the field and 60.0 percent (3-of-5) from deep with 9 rebounds, 2 assists, 1 steal and 1 block.

=== Brooklyn Nets (2025) ===
On March 28, 2025, Timme signed a multi-year contract with the Brooklyn Nets of the NBA. He made his NBA debut that day and registered a double-double with 11 points and 10 rebounds in a 132–100 loss to the Los Angeles Clippers. In his second game on March 29, Timme posted 19 points and six rebounds as the Nets beat the Washington Wizards 115–112; he also tied Derrick Coleman for Brooklyn's franchise record for most points by a player in his first two games (30). On April 6, Timme had his first career start, recording 13 points and seven rebounds in a 120–109 loss against the Toronto Raptors. He made nine appearances (two starts) for Brooklyn during his rookie campaign, averaging 12.1 points, 7.2 rebounds, and 2.2 assists. On October 13, Timme, along with Dariq Whitehead, was waived from the Nets.

=== South Bay Lakers (2025) ===
For the 2025–26 season, Timme joined the South Bay Lakers of the NBA G League.

=== Los Angeles Lakers (2025–2026) ===
On November 24, 2025, Timme signed a two-way contract with the Los Angeles Lakers.

=== Phoenix Suns (2026–present) ===
On September 27, 2026, the Minnesota Timberwolves announced Timme as part of their training camp roster. On October 17, 2026, Timme was waived.

On October 19, 2026, Timme was claimed off waivers by the Phoenix Suns.

== Career statistics ==
Legend
GP	Games played	GS	Games started	MPG	Minutes per game
FG%	Field goal percentage	3P%	3-point field goal percentage	FT%	Free throw percentage
RPG	Rebounds per game	APG	Assists per game	SPG	Steals per game
BPG	Blocks per game	PPG	Points per game	**Bold**	Career high

=== NBA ===
Year	Team	GP	GS	MPG	FG%	3P%	FT%	RPG	APG	SPG	BPG	PPG
2024–25	Brooklyn	9	**2**	**28.2**	.441	.257	**.625**	**7.2**	**2.2**	**.4**	**.1**	**12.1**
2025–26	L.A. Lakers	**27**	1	8.7	**.576**	**.440**	.556	1.2	.9	.2	.0	3.4
Career		36	3	13.6	.494	.333	.600	2.7	1.2	.3	.0	5.6

=== College ===
Year	Team	GP	GS	MPG	FG%	3P%	FT%	RPG	APG	SPG	BPG	PPG
2019–20	Gonzaga	33	4	20.5	.618	**.333**	.611	5.4	1.3	.5	.9	9.8
2020–21	Gonzaga	32	32	28.2	**.655**	.286	**.696**	7.0	2.3	**.7**	.7	19.0
2021–22	Gonzaga	32	32	28.0	.586	.286	.678	6.8	2.8	.3	.8	18.4
2022–23	Gonzaga	**37**	**37**	**31.5**	.616	.167	.632	**7.5**	**3.2**	.6	**1.0**	**21.2**
Career		134	105	27.2	.618	.250	.656	6.7	2.4	.5	.9	17.2

== Personal life ==
Timme's father, Matt Timme, played college basketball at Southern Methodist University, followed by a brief stint playing professionally in Europe. Drew's mother Megan, whom Matt married not long after he returned from Europe, played tennis at Stephen F. Austin State University.
