= Jerry Grote (basketball) =

American basketball player

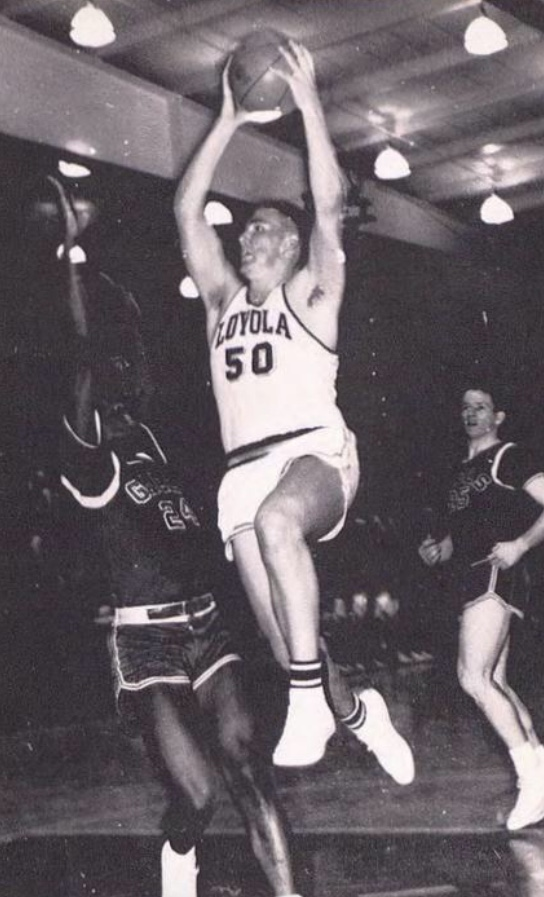
- Grote from the 1962 Lair

Personal information
- Born: December 28, 1940
- Died: March 13, 2025 (aged 84)
- Listed height: 6 ft 4 in (1.93 m)
- Listed weight: 215 lb (98 kg)

Career information
- High school: Cantwell (Montebello, California)
- College: Loyola Marymount (1959–1962)
- NBA draft: 1962: 4th round, 28th overall pick
- Drafted by: St. Louis Hawks
- Position: Guard
- Number: 32

Career history
- 1962–1963: Long Beach Chiefs
- 1964–1965: Los Angeles Lakers

Career highlights
- WCAC Player of the Year (1960); 2× First-team All-WCAC (1960, 1961); Second-team All-WCAC (1962)
- Stats at NBA.com
- Stats at Basketball Reference

Jerry C. Grote (December 28, 1940 – March 13, 2025) is an American retired basketball player. He played one season for the Los Angeles Lakers of the National Basketball Association (NBA).

== College career ==
Grote, a 6'4 guard from Cantwell High School in Montebello, California, played collegiately at Loyola University in Los Angeles (now Loyola Marymount). Grote made a splash in his first year of eligibility, averaging 14.2 points and 6.7 rebounds per game and winning West Coast Athletic Conference player of the year honors as a sophomore. He followed that up by averaging 12.6 points and 4.9 rebounds and leading the Lions to the 1961 WCAC title. In Grote's senior year, he averaged 13 points per game and was named second team All-WCAC. He finished his career with 1,011 points – scoring his 1,000th point in his final collegiate game.

== Professional career ==
Following the close of his college career, Grote was drafted in the fourth round (28th pick overall) of the 1962 NBA draft by the St. Louis Hawks. However, he opted to play for the Long Beach Chiefs of the American Basketball League. Grote averaged 7.5 points per game in 24 contests for the Chiefs in the 1962–63 season.

In the 1964–65 NBA season, Grote played for the Los Angeles Lakers. He appeared in 11 games and scored 14 total points.

He died on March 13, 2025.

== Career statistics ==
Legend
GP	Games played	GS	Games started	MPG	Minutes per game
FG%	Field goal percentage	3P%	3-point field goal percentage	FT%	Free throw percentage
RPG	Rebounds per game	APG	Assists per game	SPG	Steals per game
BPG	Blocks per game	PPG	Points per game	**Bold**	Career high

=== NBA ===
==== Regular season ====
Year	Team	GP	MPG	FG%	FT%	RPG	APG	PPG
1964–65	L.A. Lakers	11	3.0	.545	1.000	.4	.4	1.3
