= Cantwell-Sacred Heart of Mary High School =

Private school in Montebello, California, United States

Location
- 329 North Garfield Avenue; Montebello, (Los Angeles County), California 90640; United States; 34°1′2″N 118°7′48″W

Information
- Type: Private, coeducational
- Motto: Age Cum Anima Christi (Act with the Character of Christ)
- Religious affiliation: Roman Catholic
- Patron saints: St. Philip of Jesus and Sacred Heart of Mary
- Established: 1942
- Principal: Eric Crespo
- Grades: 9-12
- Colors: Cardinal, navy and gold
- Athletics conference: CIF Southern Section; Camino Real League
- Nickname: Cardinals
- Rival: Bishop Mora Salesian High School
- Accreditation: Western Association of Schools and Colleges
- Tuition: $ 7,915
- Vice Principal: Annette Chambers
- Dean of Students: Anna Gutierrez
- Athletic Director: Omar Villalta
- Website: http://www.cshm.org

Cantwell-Sacred Heart of Mary High School (CSHM) is a private Roman Catholic high school located in Montebello, California, United States, precisely on the border of East Los Angeles and Montebello. It is owned and operated by the Roman Catholic Archdiocese of Los Angeles. It is fully accredited by the Western Association of Schools and Colleges. Its challenging curriculum prepares students for admission to four-year university programs and other career options.

== History ==
=== Founding ===
Sacred Heart of Mary High School for young women was founded in 1942. The school was formally dedicated on June 30, 1943, with Archbishop John J. Cantwell presiding. The Religious of the Sacred Heart of Mary (RSHM), an international apostolic institute of religious women, were commissioned to teach at the new institution. Through their emphasis on liberal arts education and respect for all cultures, the Sisters worked to promote the growth of the human person by creating an environment which enabled young women to work for their own spiritual, educational, and personal development.

In 1946, the Most Reverend John J. Cantwell, Archbishop of Los Angeles, established Cantwell High School. At the time of its founding, the school was at St. Alphonsus Grade School, in East Los Angeles. On October 23, 1946, the school relocated to the campus it still occupies. Based on his respect for their teaching abilities, the archbishop invited the Christian Brothers of Ireland to staff the school. The school was dedicated by Archbishop Cantwell on April 13, 1947.

With the closure of nearby Sacred Heart of Mary High School in 1990, the girls attending that high school were incorporated into Cantwell-Sacred Heart of Mary High School.

=== 1950s–1980s ===
and a chapel was constructed adjacent to the convent. Both were completed in 1962. Just the chapel and convent remain today, as the rest of the property was sold.

=== Consolidation ===
Cantwell-Sacred Heart of Mary as an entity began when Sacred Heart of Mary High School, an all-girls school administered by the Religious of the Sacred Heart of Mary, and Cantwell High School, an all-boys school administered by the Irish Christian Brothers, consolidated into one lay administered coed school in 1991. Since the merger, enrollment is at about 600 students. Located in the Roman Catholic Archdiocese of Los Angeles, CSHM is a coeducational, college preparatory institution. The school's spiritual patrons are St. Philip of Jesus, and the Sacred Heart of Mary, Mother of Jesus. With the advent of young women moving to the young men's campus, the Cantwell former school motto for the conjoined schools was changed from the Latin for "Act Manfully", "Viriliter Age", to "Act with the Character of Christ", "Age cum Anima Christi". The girls all became "Cardinals" and their mascot "Scooter" was laid to rest without ceremony.

== Demographics ==
The majority of the CSHM families reside in communities surrounding the East Los Angeles area. 95% of the students are Roman Catholic. The families are characterized as blue collar/skilled labor workers and managers of small privately owned businesses. 52% of the students live below the government-designated poverty line, and would qualify for the federal school lunch program if they attended a public school. CSHM has a very generous financial aid program and, close to a fourth of the students work jobs after school to supplement their tuition. The school is completely self-supporting with the exception of support from foundations and many donors, including the Religious of the Sacred Heart of Mary, and support from the archdiocese of Los Angeles for the physical plant of the school, and its property.

== Athletics ==
The co-curricular program encourages students to develop mental and physical skills, a healthy competitive spirit, teamwork, and self-discipline.

Fall

- Football
- Girls' volleyball
- Cross country

Winter

- Boys' basketball
- Girls' basketball
- Boys' soccer
- Girls' soccer

Spring

- Baseball
- Softball
- Track and field
- Volleyball
- Golf

== Notable alumni ==
- Alice Bag, founder/singer of LA punk band The Bags
- Juan Gómez-Quiñones, professor, activist, and co-author of El Plan de Santa Barbara
- Jerry Grote, professional basketball player
- Philip S. Gutierrez, federal judge
- Craig Worthington, professional baseball player
- Rodney Alcala, Serial Killer
