= Leroy Wright =

American basketball player (1938–2020)

Personal information
- Born: May 6, 1938 New York City, New York, U.S.
- Died: March 21, 2020 (aged 82) Charlotte, North Carolina, U.S.
- Listed height: 6 ft 9 in (2.06 m)
- Listed weight: 215 lb (98 kg)

Career information
- High school: Aycock (Rockdale, Texas)
- College: Pacific (1957–1960)
- NBA draft: 1960: 2nd round, 16th overall pick
- Drafted by: Boston Celtics
- Playing career: 1960–1969
- Position: Power forward
- Number: 24, 13

Career history
- 1960–1962: Washington / New York / Philadelphia Tapers
- 1962–1963: Wilkes-Barre Barons
- 1967–1968: Bridgeport Flyers
- 1968–1969: Pittsburgh / Minnesota Pipers

Career highlights
- ABA champion (1968); 2× NCAA rebounding leader (1959, 1960); 2× WCC co-Player of the Year (1958, 1959)
- Stats at Basketball Reference

James Leroy Wright Sr. (May 6, 1938 – March 21, 2020) was an American professional basketball player. He played two seasons in the American Basketball Association (ABA) in 1967–68 and 1968–69, winning the ABA Finals in 1968 as a member of the Pittsburgh Pipers.

== Early life ==
Wright grew up in Texas and graduated from Aycock High School (Rockdale) in 1956. He was a four-sport star, playing football, basketball and track and field. He won state championships in both football (#45) and basketball (#22) during his senior year of 1955–56.

== College career ==
Wright played basketball at the College of the Pacific from 1957–58 to 1959–60 (freshmen were not allowed to play varsity sports according to NCAA rules when he was in college.) When he became eligible as a sophomore in 1957–58, Wright burst onto the national basketball scene with per game averages of 13.2 points and 17.1 rebounds. A 6 ft 9 in (2.06 m) forward, his points per game average increased in each his junior and senior seasons (14.8 and 15.9, respectively) while his rebounding averages were tops in the nation. Wright's average of 25.1 rebounds per game as a junior and 22.4 per game as a senior are the top two in Pacific history, and he became the first player ever to repeat as the NCAA rebounding leader. He was named the West Coast Conference Co-Player of the Year in his final two collegiate seasons as well, first sharing the honors with San Francisco's Mike Farmer followed by LaRoy Doss of Saint Mary's.

== Professional career ==
After his collegiate career ended, Wright was selected in the second round (16th overall) of the 1960 NBA draft by the Boston Celtics. He never played in the National Basketball Association, however, due to him being one of the many players implicated in the 1961 NCAA University Division men's basketball gambling scandal. He spent two seasons playing in the ABA in 1967–68 as a member of the Pittsburgh Pipers and then in 1968–69 when the team relocated to become the Minnesota Pipers. During his rookie season, Pittsburgh won the ABA Finals, four games to three, over the New Orleans Buccaneers. It was the first ABA championship in the league's history. For the season, Wright played in 17 games and averaged 3.4 points and 6.4 rebounds. He played another 13 games during the playoffs in which he averaged 2.0 points and 5.6 rebounds en route to the championship.

When the franchise relocated to Minnesota for the following season, Wright remained on the team but only played in 10 games and averaged a diminished 0.8 points and 3.0 rebounds. Since he was 30 years old at that point, Wright's career came to a close when he was not re-signed after the season.

== See also ==
- List of NCAA Division I men's basketball season rebounding leaders
- List of people banned or suspended by the NBA
