= Augustas Marčiulionis =

Lithuanian basketball player (born 2002)

- Marčiulionis playing for the Lithuania national team

No. 3 – Rytas Vilnius
- Position: Point guard
- League: LKL; BCL

Personal information
- Born: 21 March 2002 (age 24) Vilnius, Lithuania
- Listed height: 6 ft 4 in (1.93 m)
- Listed weight: 200 lb (91 kg)

Career information
- College: Saint Mary's (2021–2025)
- NBA draft: 2025: undrafted
- Playing career: 2018–present

Career history
- 2018–2021: Rytas Vilnius
- 2018–2020: →Perlas Vilnius
- 2025–2026: South Bay Lakers
- 2026–present: Rytas Vilnius

Career highlights
- FIBA Champions League champion (2026); 2× WCC Player of the Year (2024, 2025); 2× First-team All-WCC (2024, 2025)
- Stats at NBA.com
- Stats at Basketball Reference
Medals
Men's basketball
Representing Lithuania
FIBA U20 EuroBasket
| Silver medal – second place | 2022 Montenegro | Team |

Augustas Marčiulionis (born 21 March 2002) is a Lithuanian basketball player for the Rytas Vilnius of the Lithuanian Basketball League (LKL) and the Basketball Champions League (BCL). He played college basketball for the Saint Mary's Gaels after having played for Rytas Vilnius of the Lithuanian Basketball League (LKL). Standing 1.93 metres (6 ft 4 in), he plays the point guard position.

== Professional career ==
=== Early years in Perlas Vilnius and Rytas Vilnius ===
Marčiulionis made his professional career debut with BC Perlas in the 2018–19 season. On 23 June 2020, Marčiulionis stayed with the Rytas Vilnius. On 19 September 2020, Marčiulionis, as a member of the Rytas Vilnius, debuted in the Lithuanian Basketball League and contributed to a 106–77 season opening victory versus the Juventus Utena. However, he played under amateur contracts for both Perlas and Rytas to preserve his eligibility to play NCAA basketball.

=== South Bay Lakers ===
On 27 July 2025, Marčiulionis signed Exhibit 10 contract with the Los Angeles Lakers. He was waived prior to the start of the regular season on 18 October. On 29 October, Marčiulionis was included in the South Bay Lakers training camp roster. On November 8, 2025, Marčiulionis debuted in the South Bay Lakers during a game versus the Valley Suns by scoring 4 points, dishing out 2 assists and grabbing 2 rebounds, however his playing time was limited throughout November due to recovery from the past injury. In the 2025–26 NBA G League season he appeared in nine games with the South Bay Lakers and averaged 5.4 points, 1.9 rebounds, 3.4 assists, 0.7 steals per 16.1 minutes of playing time.

=== Return to Rytas Vilnius (2026–present) ===
On 26 February 2026, Marčiulionis once again came back and signed contract with Rytas Vilnius of the Lithuanian Basketball League (LKL) and the Basketball Champions League (BCL).

== College career ==
=== Freshman season ===
On 16 June 2021, Marčiulionis signed a letter of intent to play at Saint Mary's.

In his freshman 2021–22 season Marčiulionis played in all 34 games for the Gaels (in 13 games he was a part of the starting five), his averages were 3.1 points, 1.8 assists, and 0.9 steals per game. This season his highest scoring mark was 11 points.

=== Sophomore season ===
In his sophomore 2022–23 season Marčiulionis played in all 35 games for the Gaels and his efficiency increased as he was already scoring 5.9 points per game, however his shooting from the three-point line remained relatively low (25%). He was a starting five member in first nine games of the season, however he was coming off a bench in subsequent games. This season his highest scoring mark was 14 points.

=== Junior season ===
In his junior 2023–24 season Marčiulionis became a leader of the Gaels, he was a starting five member in all 34 games, averaged 12.4 points, 3.4 assists, one steal per game (importantly increasing his three-point shots percentage to a solid 34%) and led his team to a 2024 West Coast Conference men's basketball tournament title, the first since 2019. This season he had three double-doubles and his highest scoring mark was 28 points. He was named the WCC Player of the Year and WCC Tournament Most Outstanding Player, becoming only the second Gael to achieve both of these titles (the first was Matthew Dellavedova in 2012).

=== Senior season ===
In his senior 2024–25 season Marčiulionis continued to be a leader of the Gaels, starting in all 35 games as point guard. His averages (14.2 points, 5.9 assists per game) were the highest in the team. Furthermore, he scored over ten points in 27 of 35 games and at least 20 points in seven games, his season high scoring mark was 27 points. He had a solid percentage (34%) shooting from a three-point line for a second straight season. Moreover, he dished out five or more assists in 24 of 35 games. For a second straight season he was included in the WCC All-Tournament team. This season he became the third Gael player in history to record for the team at least 1000 points, 500 assists and 100 steals per NCAA career (other two Matthew Dellavedova and Emmett Naar). Marčiulionis was also named the WCC Player of the Year for a second straight season (the first Gael to achieve two such titles since Steve Gray in 1962–1963) and received a Lou Henson Award.

== National team career ==
In 2020, Marčiulionis was invited to play for the senior Lithuania men's national basketball team during the EuroBasket 2022 qualification on 27–29 November, however he did not received playing time. He had previously played for Lithuania's U16 and U18 national teams, and played for Lithuania at the 2021 FIBA U19 World Cup.

In 2026, Marčiulionis was again included in the final roster of the senior Lithuania men's national basketball team during the 2027 FIBA Basketball World Cup qualification on August 28–31, received his first playing time in official games and was one of Lithuania's leaders (averaged 13 points, 1.5 rebounds, 4 assists in two games). He and his father Šarūnas Marčiulionis is the second father-son duo to play for the senior Lithuania men's national basketball team (the first father-son duo is Arvydas Sabonis and Domantas Sabonis).

== Career statistics ==
Legend
| GP | Games played | GS | Games started | MPG | Minutes per game |
| FG% | Field goal percentage | 3P% | 3-point field goal percentage | FT% | Free throw percentage |
| RPG | Rebounds per game | APG | Assists per game | SPG | Steals per game |
| BPG | Blocks per game | PPG | Points per game | **Bold** | Career high |

=== College ===
| Year | Team | GP | GS | MPG | FG% | 3P% | FT% | RPG | APG | SPG | BPG | PPG |
|---|---|---|---|---|---|---|---|---|---|---|---|---|
| 2021-22 | Saint Mary's | 34 | 13 | 15.1 | .304 | .183 | **.839** | 1.0 | 1.8 | .9 | .1 | 3.1 |
| 2022-23 | Saint Mary's | **35** | 9 | 15.5 | .414 | .250 | .727 | 1.2 | 1.5 | .5 | .1 | 5.9 |
| 2023-24 | Saint Mary's | 34 | 34 | 33.1 | .438 | .343 | .763 | **3.3** | 5.3 | **1.4** | **.2** | 12.4 |
| 2024–25 | Saint Mary's | **35** | **35** | **34.8** | **.446** | **.347** | .793 | 3.1 | **5.9** | 1.3 | .1 | **14.2** |

- source.

== Personal life ==
Augustas is the son of Hall of Fame player Šarūnas Marčiulionis.
