= West Coast Conference Men's Basketball Player of the Year =

American collegiate basketball award

WCC Men's Basketball Player of the Year
- Awarded for: the most outstanding basketball player in the West Coast Conference
- Country: United States

History
- First award: 1953
- Most recent: Graham Ike, Gonzaga

The West Coast Conference Men's Basketball Player of the Year is an award given to the most outstanding men's basketball player in the West Coast Conference (WCC). The award was first given following the conference's inaugural 1952–53 season, when it was known as the California Basketball Association. The only season in which the award was not presented was the conference's second season of 1953–54. There have been six ties in the award's history, most recently in 2022–23 between Brandin Podziemski of Santa Clara and Drew Timme of Gonzaga. There have also been 13 repeat winners, but only one, Bill Cartwright of San Francisco, has been player of the year three times.

Four schools in the WCC have dominated the total awards distribution. Before 2000, Pepperdine, San Francisco and Santa Clara had earned the bulk of the awards. Since then, Gonzaga has had the overwhelming majority of selections. In the 26 seasons from 2000–01 to the Bulldogs' final WCC season in 2025–26, coinciding with the program's rise to national prominence, Gonzaga players have won or shared the award 18 times. Gonzaga now claims the most awards with 21 and most individual winners with 19. Santa Clara is second in awards with 12, and its nine individual winners give it a share of second place in that category with Pepperdine. The next closest school, Saint Mary's, has 10 awards. Among current WCC members, Portland is the only established member without a winner. Denver will play its first WCC season in 2026–27. In that same season, Gonzaga joined the reconfigured Pac-12 Conference alongside Oregon State and Washington State, which became multi-sport WCC associates, including basketball, after the 2024 collapse of the Pac-12. Neither Oregon State nor Washington State had a recipient during their two WCC seasons.

== Key ==
†	Co-Players of the Year
*	Awarded a national player of the year award that same season: Helms Foundation College Basketball Player of the Year (1904–05 to 1978–79); UPI College Basketball Player of the Year (1954–55 to 1995–96); Oscar Robertson Trophy (1958–59 to present); Naismith College Player of the Year (1968–69 to present); John R. Wooden Award (1976–77 to present)
Player (X)	Denotes the number of times the player has been awarded the WCC Player of the Year award at that point

== Winners ==
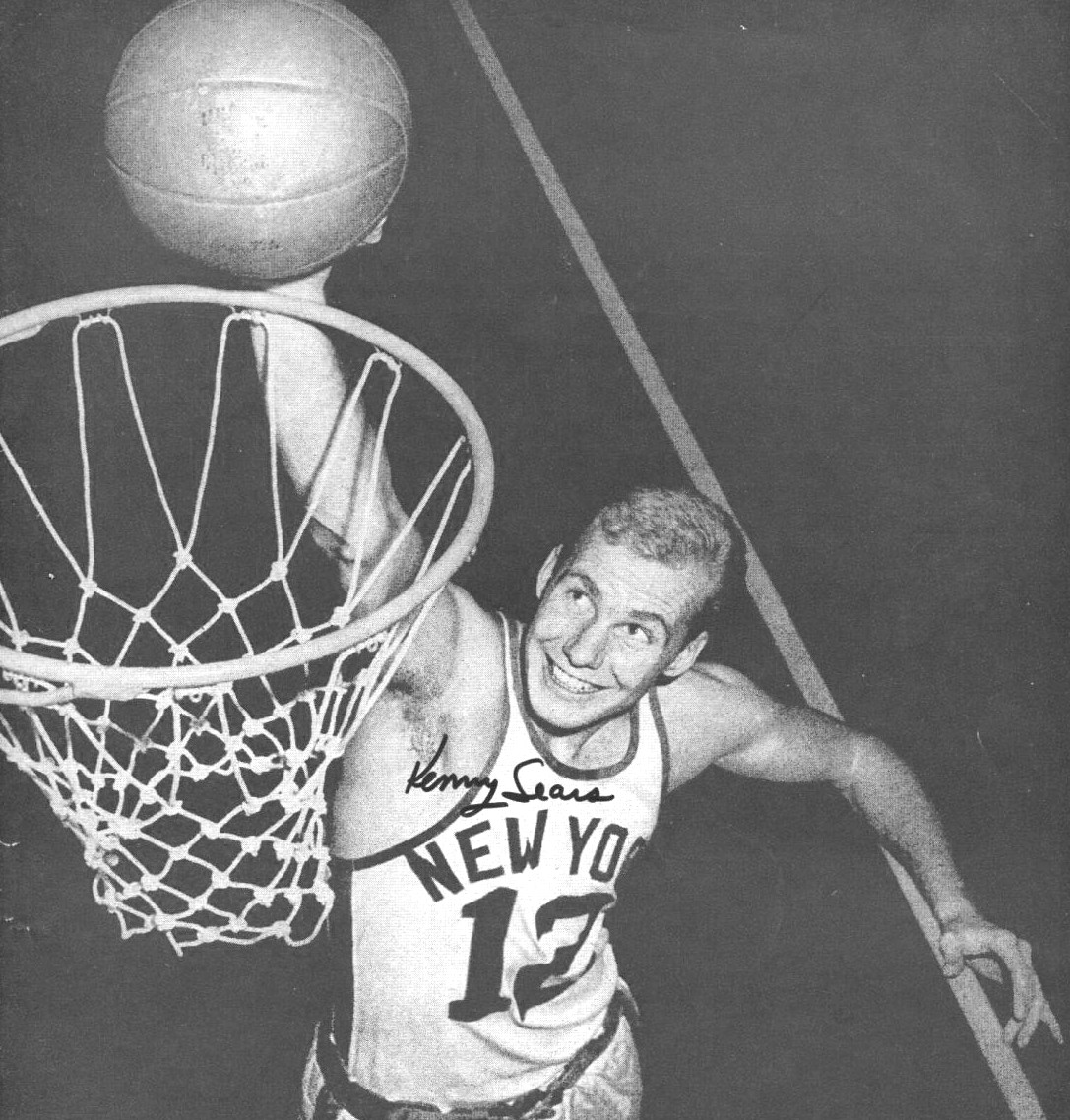
Ken Sears, Santa Clara, 1953 and 1955

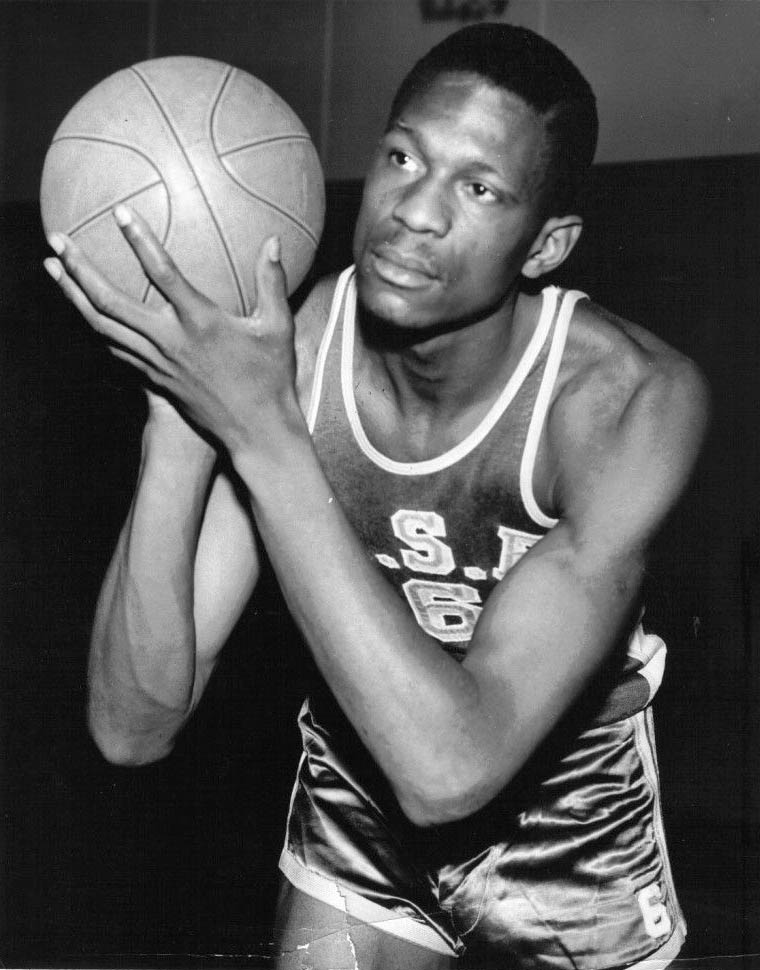
Bill Russell, San Francisco, 1956

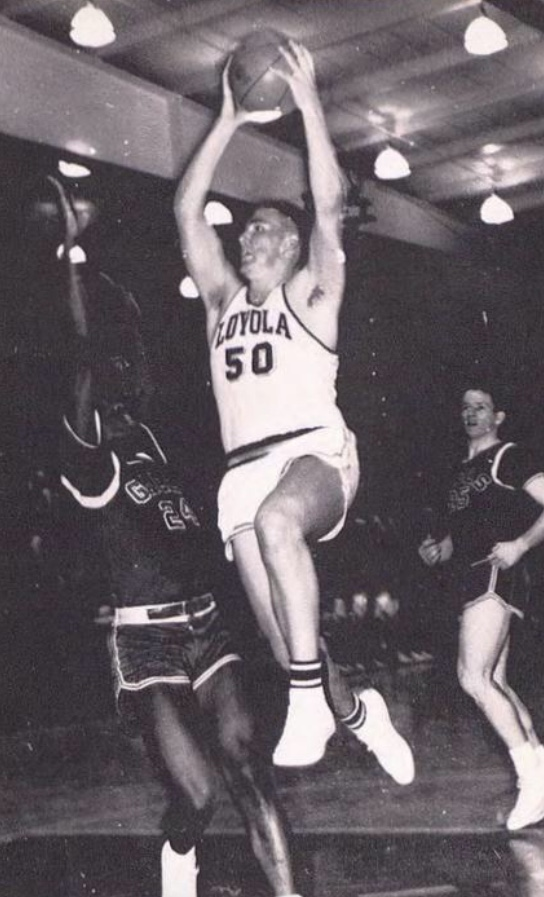
Jerry Grote, Loyola Marymount, 1960

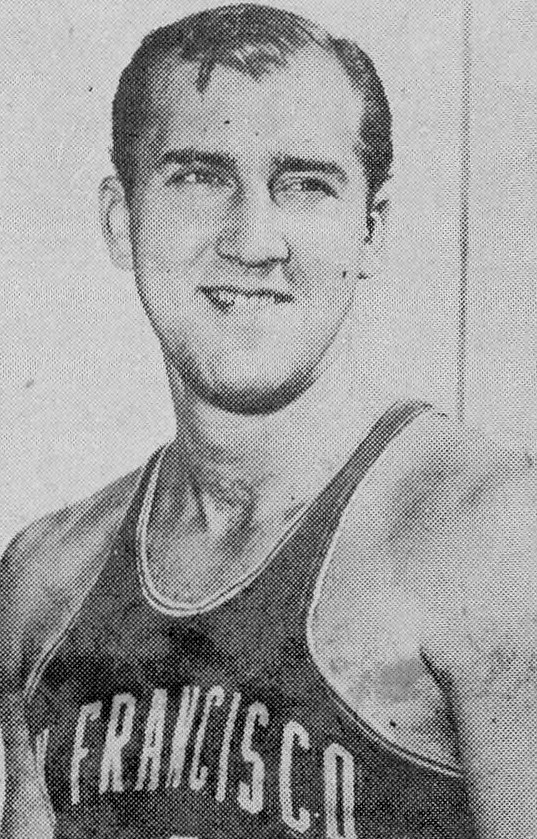
Tom Meschery, Saint Mary's, 1961

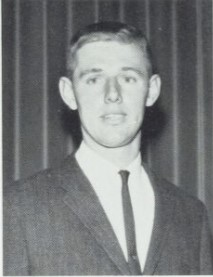
Harry Dinnel, Pepperdine, 1962

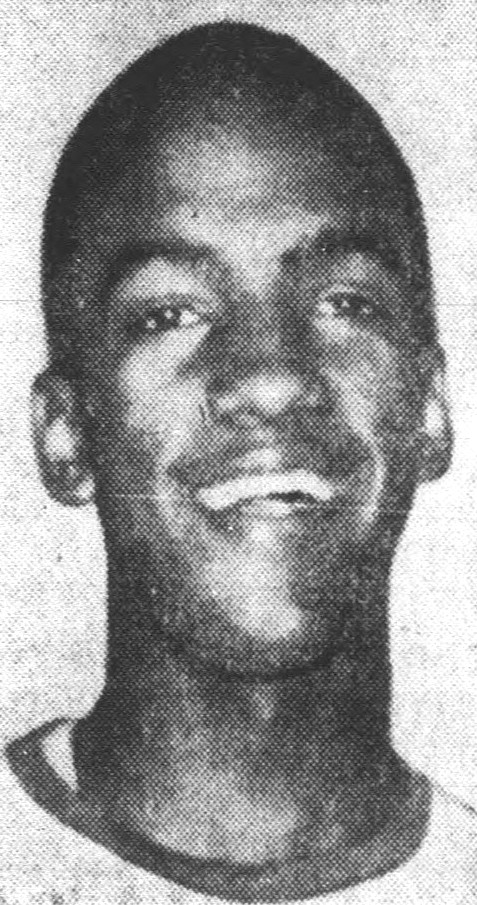
Steve Gray, Saint Mary's, 1962 and 1963

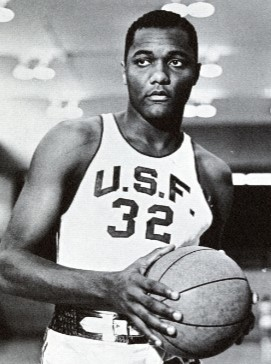
Ollie Johnson, San Francisco, 1964 and 1965

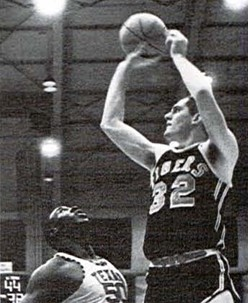
Keith Swagerty, Pacific, 1966 and 1967

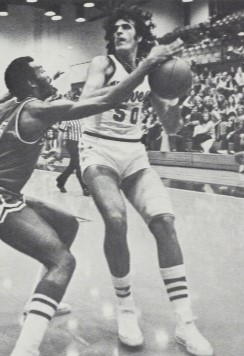
Marcos Leite, Pepperdine, 1976

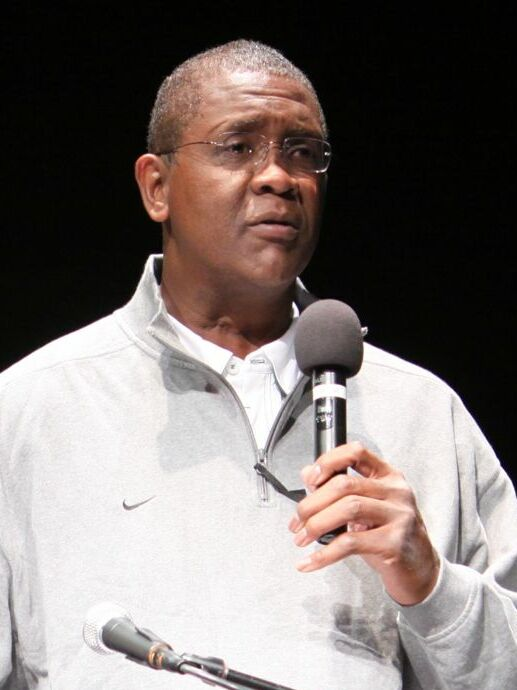
Bill Cartwright, San Francisco, 1977 through 1979

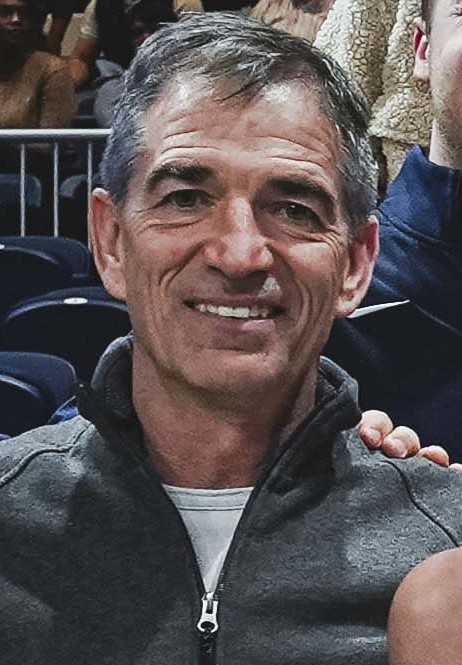
John Stockton, Gonzaga, 1984

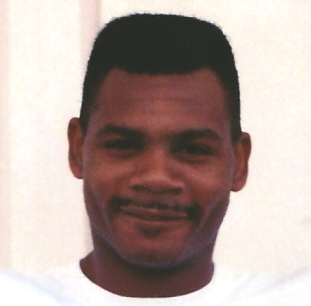
Hank Gathers, Loyola Marymount, 1989

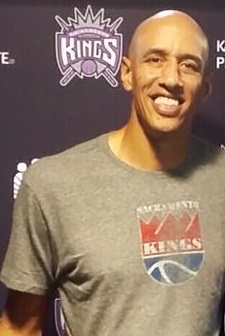
Doug Christie, Pepperdine, 1991 and 1992

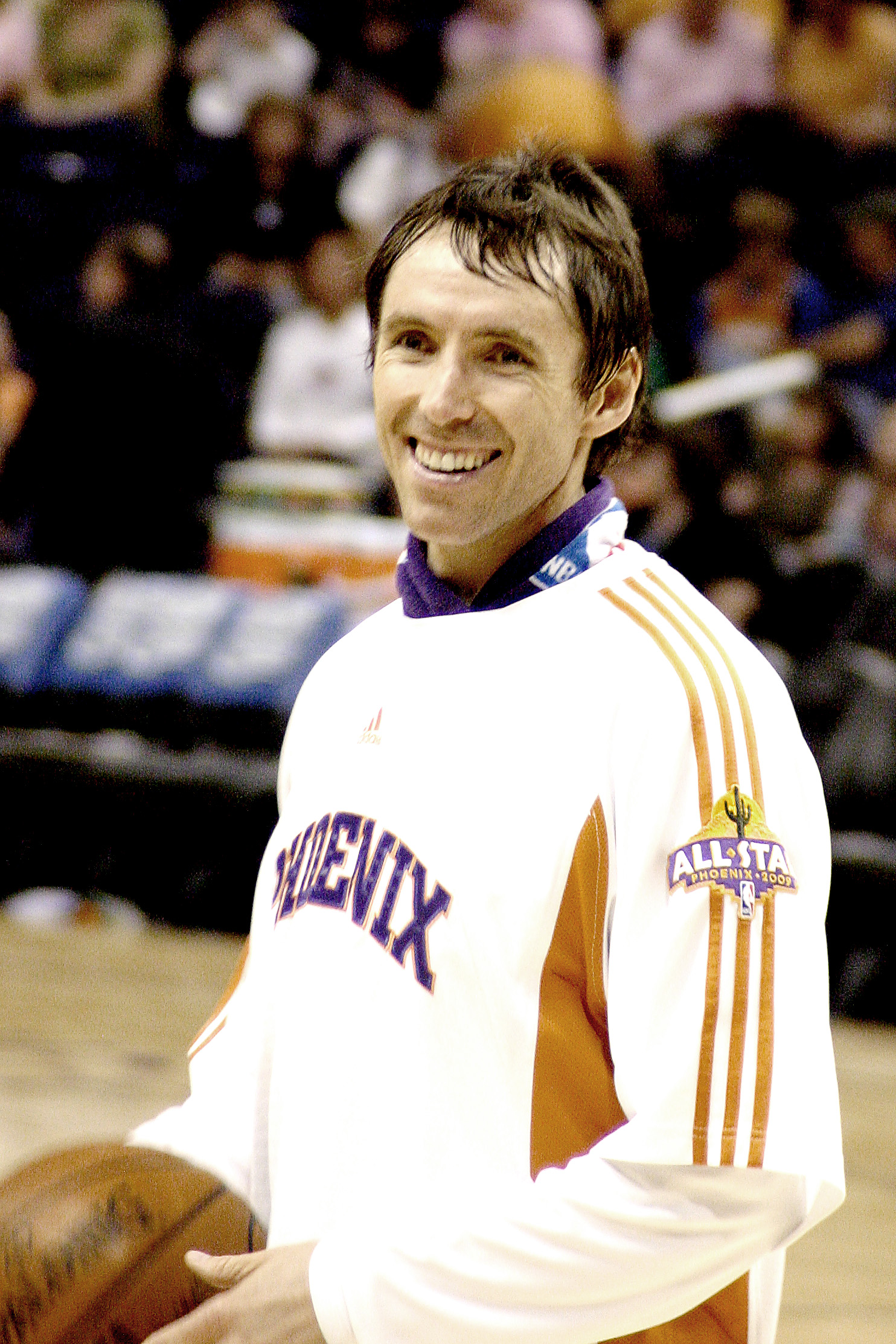
Steve Nash, Santa Clara, 1995 and 1996

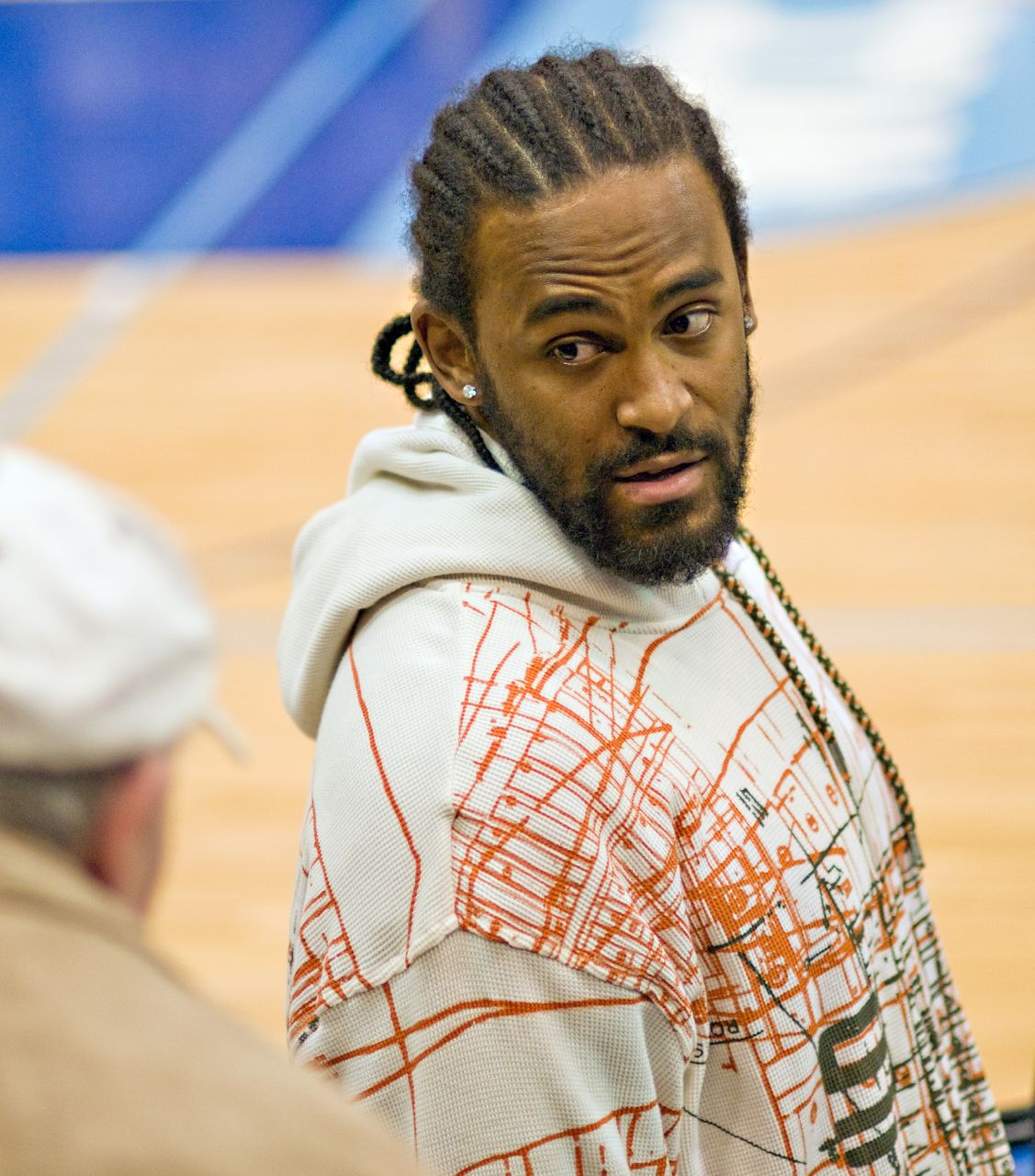
Ronny Turiaf, Gonzaga, 2005

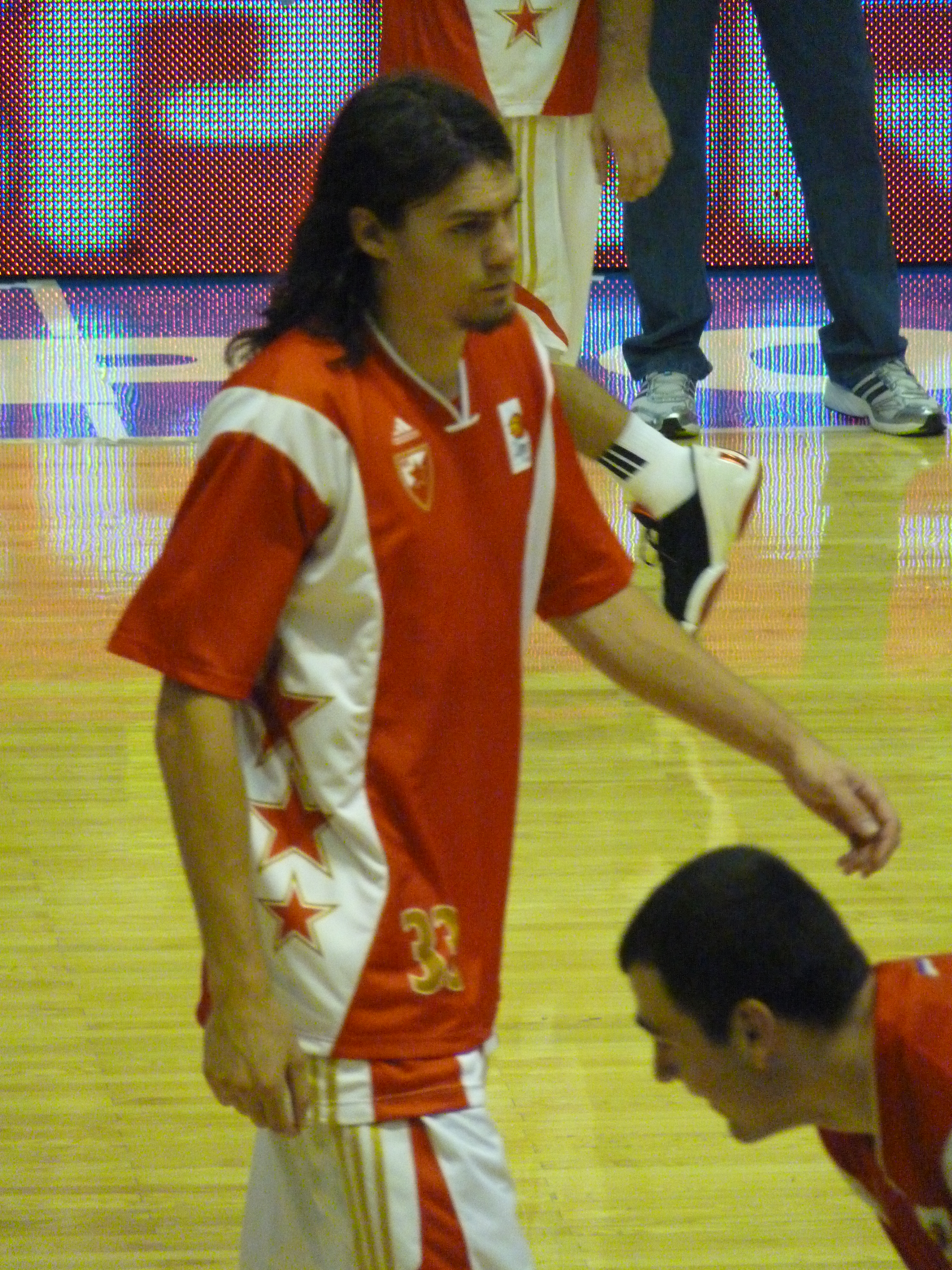
Adam Morrison, Gonzaga, 2006

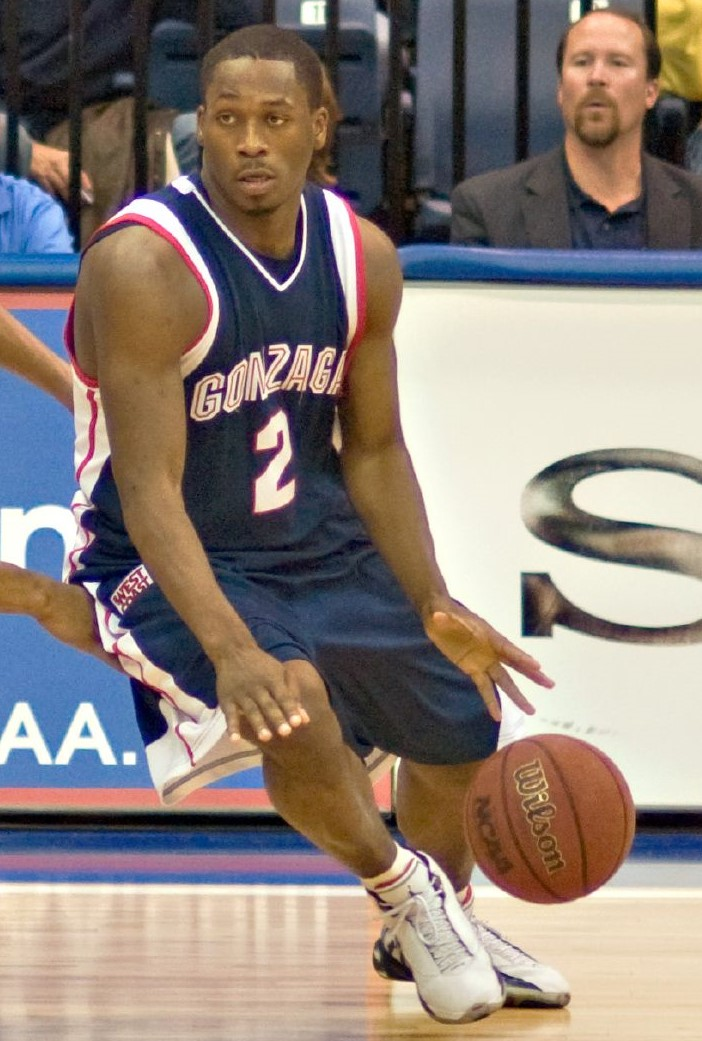
Jeremy Pargo, Gonzaga, 2008

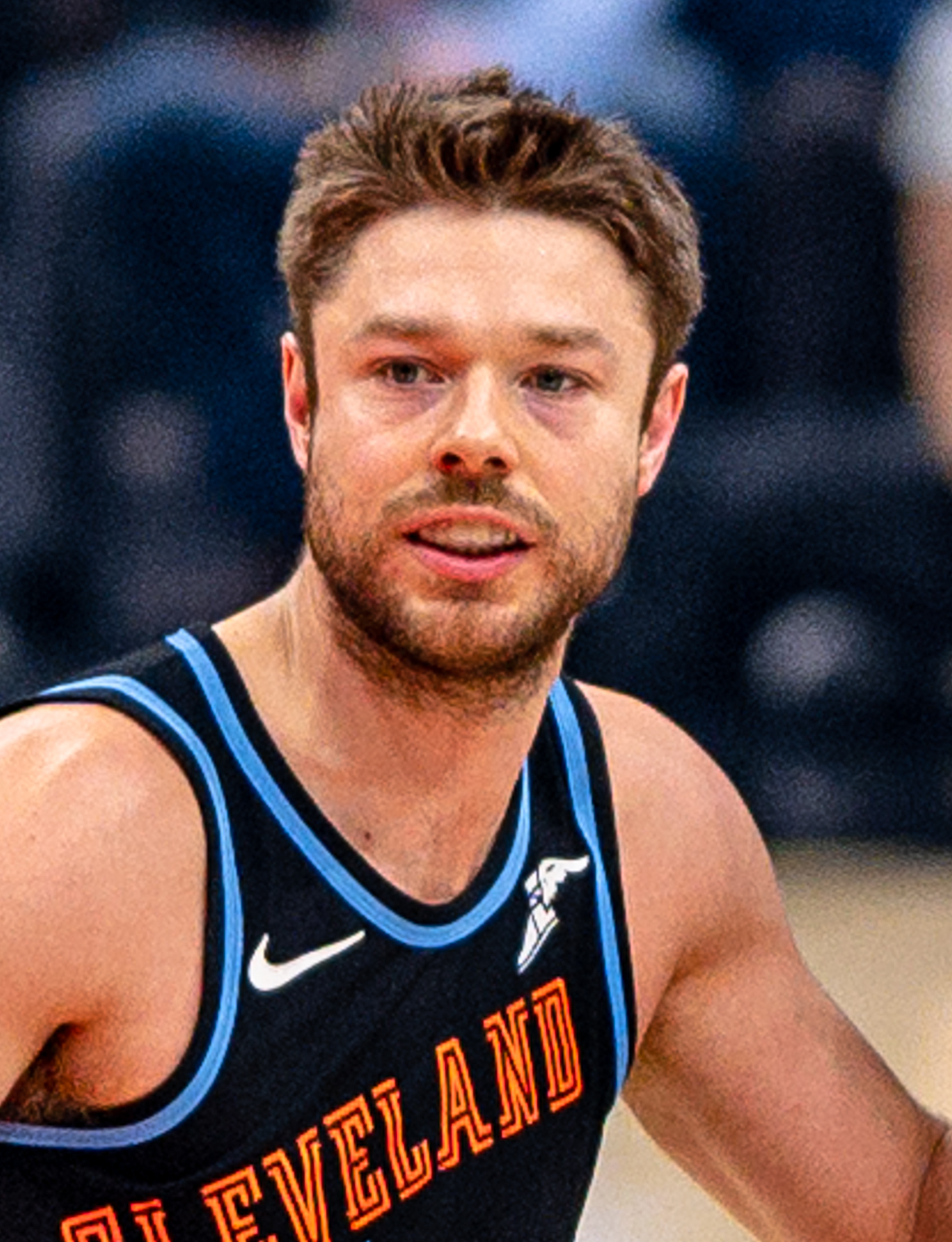
Matthew Dellavedova, Saint Mary's, 2012

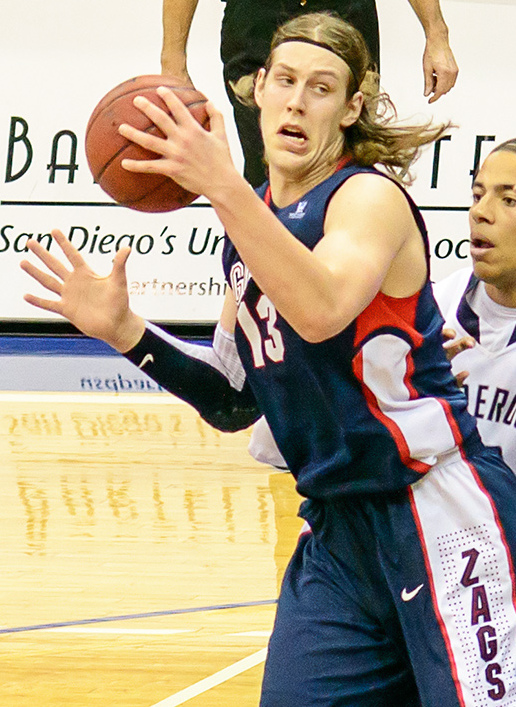
Kelly Olynyk, Gonzaga, 2013

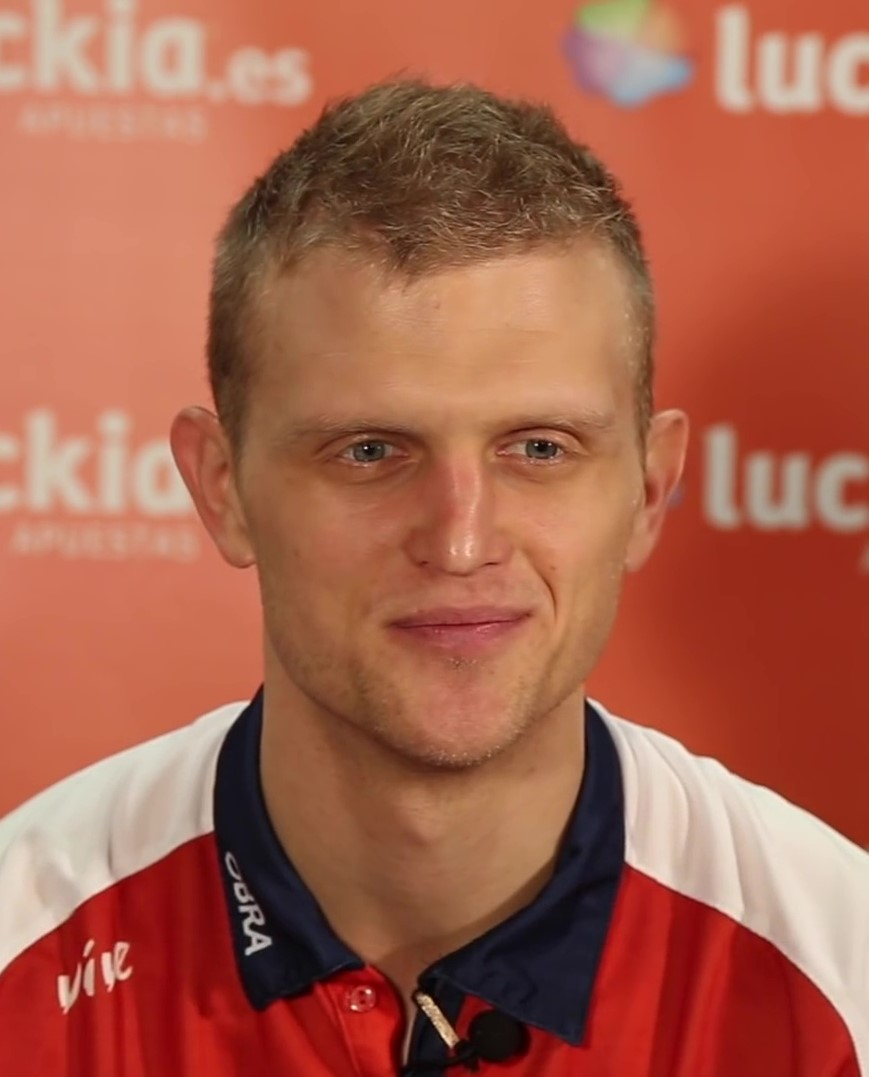
Tyler Haws, BYU, 2014

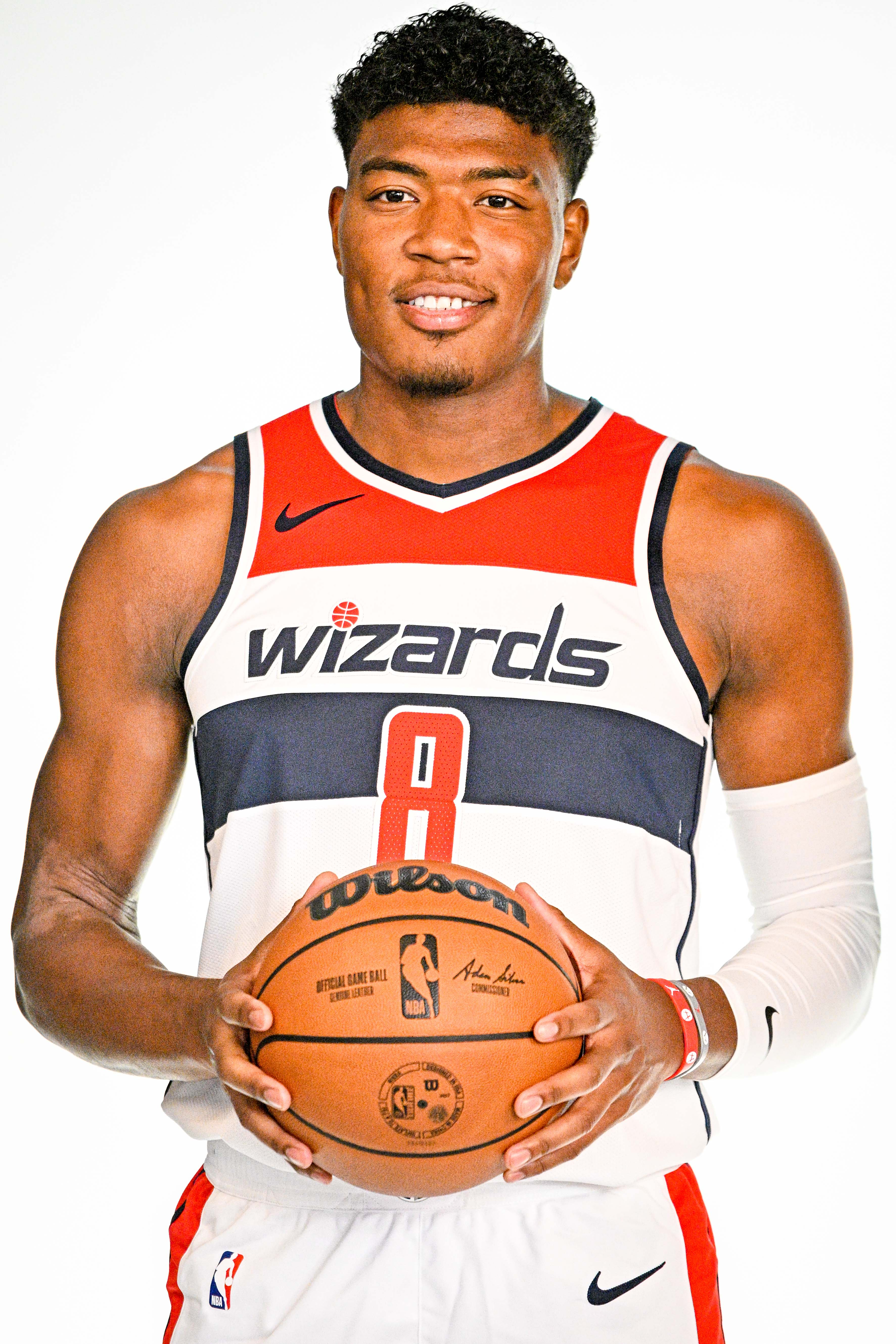
Rui Hachimura, Gonzaga, 2019

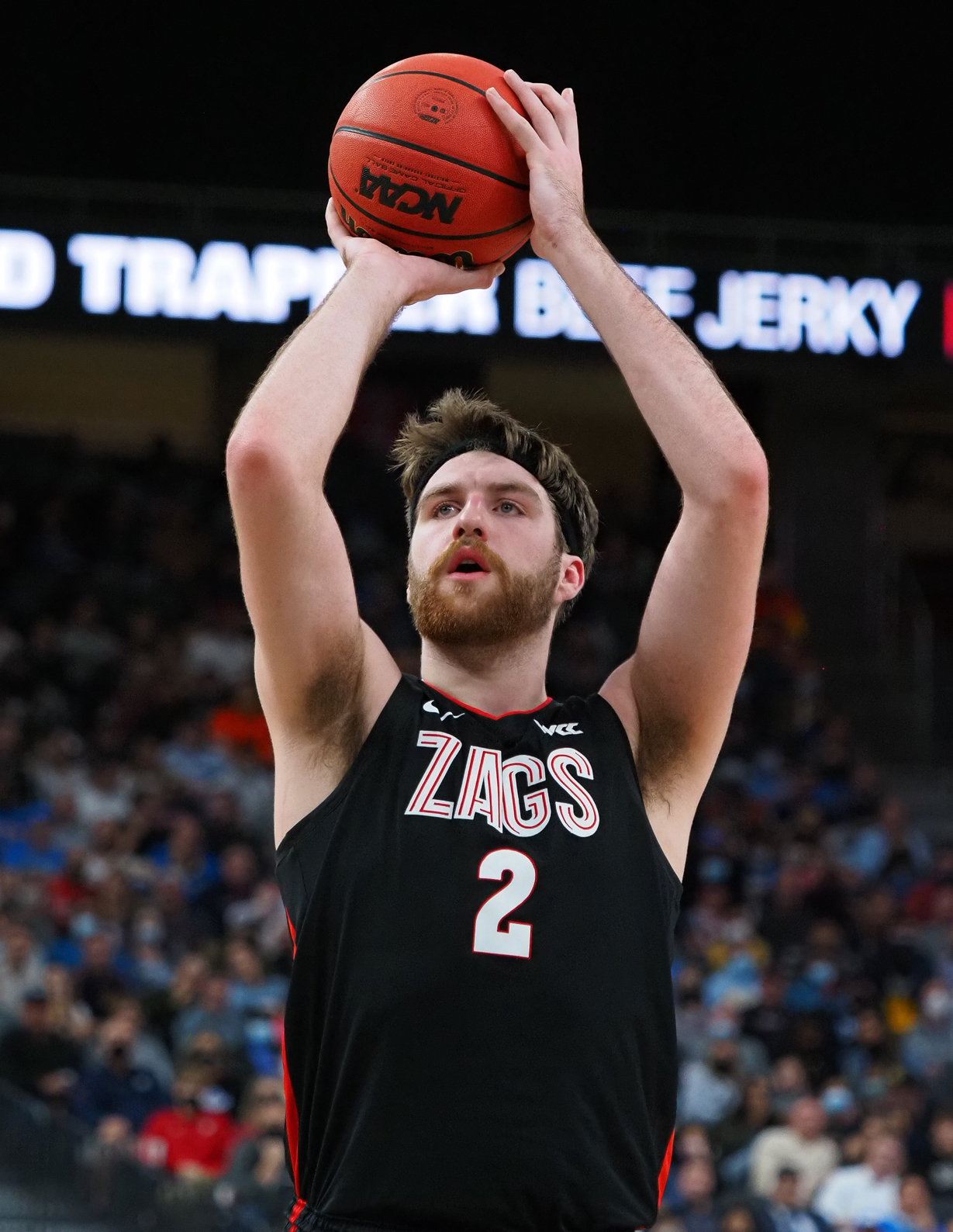
Drew Timme, Gonzaga, 2022 and 2023

Season	Player	School	Position	Class	Reference
1952–53	Ken Sears	Santa Clara	PF	Sophomore	
1953–54	None selected				
1954–55	Ken Sears (2)	Santa Clara	PF	Senior	
1955–56	Bill Russell *	San Francisco	C	Senior	
1956–57	Mike Farmer	San Francisco	PF	Junior	
1957–58^{†}	Mike Farmer (2)	San Francisco	PF	Senior	
1957–58^{†}	Leroy Wright	Pacific	PF	Junior	
1958–59^{†}	LaRoy Doss	Saint Mary's	PF	Senior	
1958–59^{†}	Leroy Wright (2)	Pacific	PF	Senior	
1959–60	Jerry Grote	Loyola Marymount	SG / PG	Sophomore	
1960–61	Tom Meschery	Saint Mary's	PF	Senior	
1961–62^{†}	Harry Dinnel	Pepperdine	SF / SG	Junior	
1961–62^{†}	Steve Gray	Saint Mary's	G	Junior	
1962–63	Steve Gray (2)	Saint Mary's	G	Senior	
1963–64	Ollie Johnson	San Francisco	C	Junior	
1964–65	Ollie Johnson (2)	San Francisco	C	Senior	
1965–66	Keith Swagerty	Pacific	F	Junior	
1966–67	Keith Swagerty (2)	Pacific	F	Senior	
1967–68	Rick Adelman	Loyola Marymount	SG	Senior	
1968–69	Dennis Awtrey	Santa Clara	C	Junior	
1969–70	Dennis Awtrey (2)	Santa Clara	C	Senior	
1970–71	John Gianelli	Pacific	C / PF	Junior	
1971–72	Mike Stewart	Santa Clara	C	Junior	
1972–73	Bird Averitt	Pepperdine	PG	Junior	
1973–74	Frank Oleynick	Seattle	SG	Sophomore	
1974–75	Ricky Sobers	UNLV	G	Senior	
1975–76	Marcos Leite	Pepperdine	PF	Junior	
1976–77	Bill Cartwright	San Francisco	C	Sophomore	
1977–78	Bill Cartwright (2)	San Francisco	C	Junior	
1978–79	Bill Cartwright (3)	San Francisco	C	Senior	
1979–80	Kurt Rambis	Santa Clara	SF	Senior	
1980–81	Quintin Dailey	San Francisco	SG	Sophomore	
1981–82	Quintin Dailey (2)	San Francisco	SG	Junior	
1982–83^{†}	Orlando Phillips	Pepperdine	C	Senior	
1982–83^{†}	Dane Suttle	Pepperdine	G	Senior	
1983–84	John Stockton	Gonzaga	PG	Senior	
1984–85	Dwayne Polee	Pepperdine	SF / SG	Junior	
1985–86	Dwayne Polee (2)	Pepperdine	SF / SG	Senior	
1986–87	Scott Thompson	San Diego	C	Senior	
1987–88	Levy Middlebrooks	Pepperdine	PF	Senior	
1988–89	Hank Gathers	Loyola Marymount	PF	Junior	
1989–90	Bo Kimble	Loyola Marymount	SG	Senior	
1990–91	Doug Christie	Pepperdine	SG	Junior	
1991–92	Doug Christie (2)	Pepperdine	SG	Senior	
1992–93	Dana Jones	Pepperdine	SF	Junior	
1993–94	Jeff Brown	Gonzaga	PF	Senior	
1994–95	Steve Nash	Santa Clara	PG	Junior	
1995–96	Steve Nash (2)	Santa Clara	PG	Senior	
1996–97	Marlon Garnett	Santa Clara	G	Senior	
1997–98	Bakari Hendrix	Gonzaga	PF	Senior	
1998–99	Eric Schraeder	Saint Mary's	PF	Senior	
1999–00	Kenyon Jones	San Francisco	C	Senior	
2000–01	Casey Calvary	Gonzaga	PF	Senior	
2001–02	Dan Dickau	Gonzaga	PG	Senior	
2002–03	Blake Stepp	Gonzaga	PG	Junior	
2003–04	Blake Stepp (2)	Gonzaga	PG	Senior	
2004–05	Ronny Turiaf	Gonzaga	C	Senior	
2005–06	Adam Morrison	Gonzaga	SF	Junior	
2006–07^{†}	Sean Denison	Santa Clara	F	Senior	
2006–07^{†}	Derek Raivio	Gonzaga	PG / SG	Senior	
2007–08	Jeremy Pargo	Gonzaga	PG	Junior	
2008–09	John Bryant	Santa Clara	C	Senior	
2009–10	Matt Bouldin	Gonzaga	SG	Senior	
2010–11	Mickey McConnell	Saint Mary's	PG	Senior	
2011–12	Matthew Dellavedova	Saint Mary's	PG	Junior	
2012–13	Kelly Olynyk	Gonzaga	C	Junior	
2013–14	Tyler Haws	BYU	SG	Junior	
2014–15	Kevin Pangos	Gonzaga	PG	Senior	
2015–16	Kyle Collinsworth	BYU	PG	Senior	
2016–17	Nigel Williams-Goss	Gonzaga	PG	Junior	
2017–18	Jock Landale	Saint Mary's	C	Senior	
2018–19	Rui Hachimura	Gonzaga	PF	Junior	
2019–20	Filip Petrušev	Gonzaga	PF	Sophomore	
2020–21	Corey Kispert	Gonzaga	SF	Senior	
2021–22	Drew Timme	Gonzaga	PF	Junior	
2022–23^{†}	Brandin Podziemski	Santa Clara	SG	Sophomore	
2022–23^{†}	Drew Timme (2)	Gonzaga	PF	Senior	
2023–24	Augustas Marčiulionis	Saint Mary's	PG	Junior	
2024–25	Augustas Marčiulionis (2)	Saint Mary's	PG	Senior	
2025–26	Graham Ike	Gonzaga	PF	Senior	

== Winners by school ==
School (year joined)	Winners	Years
Gonzaga (1979) (Note: Gonzaga University left the WCC in 2026 to join the Pac-12 Conference.)	21	1984, 1994, 1998, 2001, 2002, 2003, 2004, 2005, 2006, 2007^{†}, 2008, 2010, 2013, 2015, 2017, 2019, 2020, 2021, 2022, 2023^{†}, 2026
Santa Clara (1952)	12	1953, 1955, 1969, 1970, 1972, 1980, 1995, 1996, 1997, 2007^{†}, 2009, 2023^{†}
Pepperdine (1955)	11	1962^{†}, 1973, 1976, 1983 (×2)^{†}, 1985, 1986, 1988, 1991, 1992, 1993
San Francisco (1952)	11	1956, 1957, 1958^{†}, 1964, 1965, 1977, 1978, 1979, 1981, 1982, 2000
Saint Mary's (1952)	10	1959^{†}, 1961, 1962^{†}, 1963, 1999, 2011, 2012, 2018, 2024, 2025
Pacific (1952/2013) (Note: The University of the Pacific left in 1971 to join its football team in the Pacific Coast Athletic Association (PCAA), now known as the Big West Conference. Pacific had been a charter PCAA member for football only in 1969. The school, which dropped football in 1995, rejoined the WCC in 2013.)	5	1958^{†}, 1959^{†}, 1966, 1967, 1971
Loyola Marymount (1955)	4	1960, 1968, 1989, 1990
BYU (2011) (Note: Brigham Young University left the WCC in 2023 to join the Big 12 Conference.)	2	2014, 2016
San Diego (1979)	1	1987
Seattle (1971/2025) (Note: Seattle University left in 1980 to become an NAIA school. It has since rejoined the NCAA, first as a Division II school and now in Division I, and rejoined the WCC in July 2025.)	1	1974
UNLV (1969) (Note: The University of Nevada, Las Vegas (UNLV) left in 1975 to become a Division I independent. UNLV is now a member of the Mountain West Conference (MW).)	1	1975
Denver (2026)	0	—
Fresno State (1955) (Note: California State University, Fresno, more commonly known as Fresno State, spent two seasons as a dual member of the California Collegiate Athletic Association (CCAA) and the then-WCAC. The Bulldogs returned to exclusive CCAA membership in 1957 and are now in the Pac-12.)	0	—
Nevada (1969) (Note: The University of Nevada, Reno (Nevada) left in 1979 for the Big Sky Conference. The Wolf Pack are now in the MW.)	0	—
Oregon State (2024) (Note: Oregon State University and Washington State University, the only schools that did not leave the Pac-12 in 2024, left the WCC upon the expiration of their affiliation contract in 2026, coinciding with the addition of seven schools, including Fresno State and Gonzaga, to the Pac-12.)	0	—
Portland (1976)	0	—
San Jose State (1952) (Note: San Jose State University left in 1969 to become a founding member of the PCAA. The Spartans are now in the MW.)	0	—
UC Santa Barbara (1964) (Note: The University of California, Santa Barbara left in 1969 to become a founding member of the PCAA. Apart from a two-year stint in the mid-1970s in which they were independent, the Gauchos have remained in the PCAA/Big West to this day, but will rejoin the WCC in 2027.)	0	—
Washington State (2024)	0	—
