= LaRoy Doss =

American basketball player and businessman

Personal information
- Born: October 6, 1936 San Francisco, California
- Died: September 7, 2004 (aged 67)
- Listed height: 6 ft 5 in (1.96 m)

Career information
- High school: Sacred Heart (San Francisco, California)
- College: Saint Mary's (1956–1959)
- NBA draft: 1959: undrafted
- Position: Power forward

Career highlights
- WCC co-Player of the Year (1959)

LaRoy Samuel Doss (October 6, 1936 – September 7, 2004) was an American college basketball player and businessman. He was the first African-American player in Saint Mary's College history and their first to be named West Coast Conference player of the year.

Doss was an All-City power forward at Sacred Heart High School in San Francisco. He went to nearby Saint Mary's in Moraga, California, where he played from 1956 to 1959. Doss was a three-year starter (freshmen were not eligible to play at this time) and was named second team All-West Coast Athletic Conference (WCAC) in each of his first two years and led the team in scoring as a junior.

Doss' senior season was a magical one. Doss averaged 15.8 points per game and was named the 1959 West Coast Conference co-player of the year with Pacific's Leroy Wright. Doss teamed up in the frontcourt with future NBA player Tom Meschery to lead the Gaels to an 11–1 WCAC record. In the 1959 NCAA tournament, the Gaels made it to the West Regional Final, but lost to eventual champion California.

LaRoy Doss scored 1,139 points (14.8 per game) and grabbed 712 rebounds (9.2 per game).

Following the close of his college career, Doss did not play professionally. He did enjoy a long career in business, owning several automobile dealerships throughout Northern California. In 1978, Doss was honored as one of the top 100 black businessmen in America by Black Enterprise magazine. Doss died on September 7, 2004.
