= Eric Schraeder =

American basketball player (born 1977)

Personal information
- Born: March 10, 1977 (age 49)
- Listed height: 6 ft 9 in (2.06 m)
- Listed weight: 225 lb (102 kg)

Career information
- High school: Regis Jesuit (Denver, Colorado); Manual (Denver, Colorado)
- College: Saint Mary's (1995–1999)
- NBA draft: 1999: undrafted
- Playing career: 1999–2003
- Position: Forward

Career history
- 1999–2000: Las Vegas Silver Bandits
- 2000–2001: Södertälje Kings
- 2001–2002: Opel Skyliners
- 2002–2003: Brandt Hagen

Career highlights
- WCC Player of the Year (1999); First-team All-WCC (1999)

Eric Schraeder (born March 10, 1977) is an American former basketball player. He played professionally in Sweden and Germany and was the 1999 West Coast Conference player of the year as a senior at Saint Mary's College.

== College career ==
Schraeder, a forward from Regis Jesuit High School and Manual High School in Denver, Colorado, played collegiate basketball at Saint Mary's. As a sophomore in 1996–97, Schraeder was a key player for the Gaels' third NCAA tournament team, averaging 6.8 points and 3.9 rebounds per game. As a junior, Schraeder moved into the Gaels' starting lineup full-time. He averaged 15.7 points and 6.9 rebounds per game.

Schraeder's senior year was a breakout performance as he led the West Coast Conference in scoring at 19.8 points per game. He set a Saint Mary's single season scoring record with 614 points (since eclipsed by Omar Samhan) and led the Gaels in rebounding at 6.1 per game. For his Saint Mary's career, Schraeder scored 1,396 points and left as the Gaels' all-time leader in free throw percentage (.840). He was elected to the Saint Mary's athletic Hall of Fame in 2010.

== Professional career ==
Following the close of his college career, Schraeder signed with the Las Vegas Silver Bandits of the International Basketball League. After a season with the Silver Bandits, Schraeder moved his career to Europe, first with the Södertälje Kings of the Swedish Basketball League, then moved to Germany's Basketball Bundesliga for the Opel Skyliners and Brandt Hagen. Schraeder retired from professional basketball in 2003 to enter the business world.
