= 2024–25 Saint Mary's Gaels men's basketball team =

American college basketball season

2024–25 Saint Mary's Gaels men's basketball

WCC regular season champions

NCAA tournament, Second Round
- Conference: West Coast Conference

Ranking
- Coaches: No. 22
- AP: No. 24
- Record: 29–6 (17–1 WCC)
- Head coach: Randy Bennett (24th season)
- Associate head coach: Mickey McConnell
- Assistant coaches: Joe Rahon; Dan Sheets; Trey Touchet
- Home arena: University Credit Union Pavilion (Capacity: 3,500)

2024–25 West Coast Conference men's basketball standings
	Conf.				Overall
Team	W		L	PCT	W		L	PCT
No. 24 Saint Mary's	17	–	1	.944	29	–	6	.829
No. 23 Gonzaga †	14	–	4	.778	26	–	9	.743
San Francisco	13	–	5	.722	25	–	10	.714
Santa Clara	12	–	6	.667	21	–	13	.618
Oregon State	10	–	8	.556	20	–	13	.606
Washington State	8	–	10	.444	19	–	15	.559
Loyola Marymount	8	–	10	.444	17	–	15	.531
Portland	7	–	11	.389	12	–	20	.375
Pepperdine	4	–	14	.222	13	–	22	.371
Pacific	4	–	14	.222	9	–	24	.273
San Diego	2	–	16	.111	6	–	27	.182
† 2025 WCC tournament winner Rankings from AP poll

The 2024–25 Saint Mary's Gaels men's basketball team represented Saint Mary's College of California during the 2024–25 NCAA Division I men's basketball season. The team was led by head coach Randy Bennett in his 24th season at Saint Mary's. The Gaels played their home games at the University Credit Union Pavilion (Note: Formerly known as McKeon Pavilion) in Moraga, California, as members of the West Coast Conference (WCC). For the first time since 2012, the Gaels won an outright WCC title with a 17-1 record, although they were defeated by rival Gonzaga in the WCC tournament championship. They received a #7 seed in the NCAA Tournament, defeating Vanderbilt in the first round of before falling to Alabama.

== Previous season ==
The Gaels finished the 2023–24 season 26–8, 15–1 in WCC play to win the regular season championship. As the No. 1 seed in the WCC tournament, they defeated Santa Clara in the semifinals and beat Gonzaga in the championship to win the WCC tournament. Therefore, they received an automatic bid to the NCAA tournament, where, as the No. 5 seed in the West region, they were upset in the first round by Grand Canyon.

== Offseason ==
=== Departures ===
Name	Number	Pos.	Height	Weight	Year	Hometown	Reason for departure
Joshua Jefferson	5	F	6'8"	220	Sophomore	Las Vegas, NV	Transferred to Iowa State
Chris Howell	15	G	6'6"	195	(redshirt) Sophomore	San Diego, CA	Transferred to UC San Diego
Aidan Mahaney	20	G	6'3"	180	Sophomore	Lafayette, CA	Transferred to UConn
Mason Forbes	25	F	6'9"	230	(redshirt) Senior	Folsom, CA	Graduated
Alex Ducas	44	G/F	6'7"	220	GS senior	Geraldton, Australia	Graduated/undrafted in 2024 NBA draft; signed with the Oklahoma City Thunder
Jensen Bradtke	50	F	6'10"	220	Freshman	Sandringham, Australia	Transferred to Montana

=== Incoming transfers ===
Name	Number	Pos.	Height	Weight	Year	Hometown	Previous school
Ashton Hardaway	9	F	6'8"	210	Sophomore	Carson, CA	Memphis
Paulius Murauskas	23	F	6'8"	225	Sophomore	Kaunas, Lithuania	Arizona

=== 2024 recruiting class ===
College recruiting
Name	Hometown	School	Height	Weight	Commit date
Liam Campbell #19 SG	Meridian, ID	Owyhee High School	6 ft 4 in (1.93 m)	180 lb (82 kg)	May 10, 2024
Liam Campbell #19 SG	Recruit ratings: Rivals: 247Sports: ESPN: (83)				
Mikey Lewis #23 SG	Oakland, CA	Prolific Prep	6 ft 3 in (1.91 m)	185 lb (84 kg)	Oct 27, 2023
Mikey Lewis #23 SG	Recruit ratings: Rivals: 247Sports: ESPN: (82)				
Joshua Dent; SG	New South Wales, Australia	Centre of Excellence	6 ft 3 in (1.91 m)	185 lb (84 kg)	Nov 8, 2023
Joshua Dent; SG	Recruit ratings: Rivals: 247Sports: ESPN: (NR)				
Oliver Faubert; PF	Fort Erie, ON	Fort Erie International Academy	6 ft 9 in (2.06 m)	205 lb (93 kg)	Jun 6, 2024
Oliver Faubert; PF	Recruit ratings: Rivals: 247Sports: ESPN: (NR)				
Overall recruit ranking: Scout: nr Rivals: nr ESPN: nr
Note: In many cases, Scout, Rivals, 247Sports, On3, and ESPN may conflict in their listings of height and weight.; In these cases, the average was taken. ESPN grades are on a 100-point scale.; Sources: "ESPN". ESPN.; "2024 Team Ranking". Rivals.

== Roster ==
2024–25 Saint Mary's Gaels men's basketball team
Players
Coaches

Pos.	#	Name	Height	Weight	Year	Previous school	Hometown
G	0	Mikey Lewis	6 ft 3 in (1.91 m)	180 lb (82 kg)	Fr	Prolific Prep	Oakland, CA
C	1	Harry Wessels	7 ft 1 in (2.16 m)	275 lb (125 kg)	Jr	AIS Centre of Excellence	Boddington, Australia
G	2	Jordan Ross	6 ft 3 in (1.91 m)	190 lb (86 kg)	So	Link Academy	Layton, UT
G	3	Augustas Marčiulionis	6 ft 4 in (1.93 m)	200 lb (91 kg)	Sr	Rytas Vilnius	Vilnius, Lithuania
G	7	Joshua Dent	6 ft 3 in (1.91 m)	190 lb (86 kg)	Fr	AIS Centre of Excellence	Wollongong, Australia
G	8	Rory Hawke	6 ft 5 in (1.96 m)	200 lb (91 kg)	RS So	AIS Centre of Excellence	Townsville, Australia
F	9	Ashton Hardaway	6 ft 8 in (2.03 m)	210 lb (95 kg)	So	Sierra Canyon School; Memphis	Carson, CA
C	11	Mitchell Saxen	6 ft 10 in (2.08 m)	250 lb (113 kg)	GS	Ingraham HS	Seattle, WA
F	14	Oilver Faubert	6 ft 9 in (2.06 m)	215 lb (98 kg)	Fr	Fort Erie International Academy	Fort Erie, ON
G	15	Liam Campbell	6 ft 4 in (1.93 m)	200 lb (91 kg)	Fr	Owyhee HS	Meridian, ID
G	22	Cade Bennett (W)	6 ft 0 in (1.83 m)	170 lb (77 kg)	RS So	Campolindo HS	Moraga, CA
F	23	Paulius Murauskas	6 ft 8 in (2.03 m)	235 lb (107 kg)	So	BC Lietkabelis; Arizona	Kaunas, Lithuania
F	24	Kevin Gad (W)	6 ft 6 in (1.98 m)	200 lb (91 kg)	RS So	Granada HS	Livermore, CA
G/F	33	Luke Barrett	6 ft 6 in (1.98 m)	215 lb (98 kg)	RS Sr	Piedmont HS	Piedmont, CA
C	45	Andrew McKeever	7 ft 1 in (2.16 m)	275 lb (125 kg)	So	Granada HS	Livermore, CA

Head coach

- Randy Bennett (UC San Diego)

Assistant coach(es)

- Mickey McConnell (Saint Mary's)
- Joe Rahon (Saint Mary's)
- Dan Sheets (Saint Mary's)
- Trey Touchet (McNeese State)

Legend

- (C) Team captain
- (S) Suspended
- (I) Ineligible
- (W) Walk-on
- Injured
- Current redshirt

Roster

== Schedule and results ==
Date time, TV	Rank^{#}	Opponent^{#}	Result	Record	High points	High rebounds	High assists	Site (attendance) city, state
Non-conference regular season
November 4, 2024*; 7:00 p.m., ESPN+		Towson	W 76–69	1–0	14 – Tied	13 – Murauskas	8 – Marčiulionis	University Credit Union Pavilion (3,326); Moraga, CA
November 7, 2024*; 7:00 p.m., ESPN+		Chattanooga	W 86–74	2–0	27 – Marčiulionis	11 – Murauskas	7 – Marčiulionis	University Credit Union Pavilion (3,188); Moraga, CA
November 12, 2024*; 7:00 p.m., ESPN+		Akron	W 87–68	3–0	18 – Lewis	15 – Murauskas	11 – Marčiulionis	University Credit Union Pavilion (3,316); Moraga, CA
November 17, 2024*; 10:00 a.m., BTN		vs. Nebraska	W 77–74	4–0	23 – Lewis	12 – Saxen	4 – Marčiulionis	Sanford Pentagon (3,241); Sioux Falls, SD
November 20, 2024*; 7:00 p.m., ESPN+		Stanislaus State	W 78–38	5–0	14 – Wessels	11 – Murauskas	7 – Bennett	University Credit Union Pavilion (3,148); Moraga, CA
November 23, 2024*; 5:00 p.m., ESPN+		Cal Poly; Acrisure Classic campus site game	W 80–66	6–0	19 – Barrett	13 – Saxen	8 – Ross	University Credit Union Pavilion (3,500); Moraga, CA
November 28, 2024*; 6:00 p.m., TruTV		vs. USC; Acrisure Classic semifinals	W 71–36	7–0	15 – Ross	7 – Tied	4 – Tied	Acrisure Arena (1,006); Thousand Palms, CA
November 29, 2024*; 6:30 p.m., TruTV		vs. Arizona State; Acrisure Classic Championship Game	L 64–68	7–1	19 – Ross	9 – Tied	4 – Ross	Acrisure Arena (2,310); Thousand Palms, CA
December 3, 2024*; 7:00 p.m., ESPN+		UTSA	W 82–74 ^{OT}	8–1	23 – Marčiulionis	13 – Saxen	8 – Marčiulionis	University Credit Union Pavilion (3,015); Moraga, CA
December 7, 2024*; 4:00 p.m., ESPN+		at Utah	W 72–63	9–1	29 – Murauskas	8 – McKeever	8 – Marčiulionis	Jon M. Huntsman Center (7,435); Salt Lake City, UT
December 14, 2024*; 6:00 p.m.		vs. Boise State	L 65–67 ^{OT}	9–2	17 – Marčiulionis	8 – McKeever	6 – Marčiulionis	Mountain America Center (3,443); Idaho Falls, ID
December 19, 2024*; 7:00 p.m., ESPN+		Merrimack	W 73–68	10–2	18 – Tied	12 – Saxen	5 – Ross	University Credit Union Pavilion (3,255); Moraga, CA
December 22, 2024*; 5:00 p.m., ESPN+		Utah State	L 68–75	10–3	18 – Saxen	7 – Barrett	8 – Marčiulionis	University Credit Union Pavilion (3,500); Moraga, CA
WCC regular season
December 28, 2024; 5:00 p.m., ESPN+		Pacific	W 70–60	11–3 (1–0)	20 – Barrett	13 – Murauskas	11 – Marčiulionis	University Credit Union Pavilion (3,500); Moraga, CA
January 2, 2025; 7:00 p.m., ESPN+		Pepperdine	W 71–41	12–3 (2–0)	16 – Barrett	12 – Murauskas	8 – Ross	University Credit Union Pavilion (3,391); Moraga, CA
January 4, 2025; 7:00 p.m., ESPN+		at Portland	W 81–58	13–3 (3–0)	20 – Marčiulionis	10 – Saxen	6 – Marčiulionis	Chiles Center (1,678); Portland, OR
January 7, 2025; 8:00 p.m., ESPN2		Loyola Marymount	W 81–56	14–3 (4–0)	23 – Marčiulionis	10 – Tied	2 – Tied	University Credit Union Pavilion (3,344); Moraga, CA
January 11, 2025; 7:00 p.m., ESPN+		at San Diego	W 103–56	15–3 (5–0)	18 – Lewis	12 – Saxen	5 – Tied	Jenny Craig Pavilion (1,349); San Diego, CA
January 18, 2025; 7:00 p.m., ESPN+		at Pepperdine	W 74–50	16–3 (6–0)	17 – Barrett	7 – Barrett	6 – Marčiulionis	Firestone Fieldhouse (632); Malibu, CA
January 23, 2025; 6:00 p.m., CBSSN		San Francisco	W 71–51	17–3 (7–0)	24 – Murauskas	8 – Barrett	6 – Marčiulionis	University Credit Union Pavilion (3,500); Moraga, CA
January 25, 2025; 5:00 p.m., CBSSN		at Washington State	W 80–75	18–3 (8–0)	25 – Murauskas	12 – Murauskas	7 – Marčiulionis	Beasley Coliseum (4,240); Pullman, WA
January 29, 2025; 6:00 p.m., ESPNU		at Santa Clara	W 67–54	19–3 (9–0)	12 – Saxen	14 – Murauskas	5 – Marčiulionis	Leavey Center (3,208); Santa Clara, CA
February 1, 2025; 8:00 p.m., ESPN		Gonzaga; Rivalry	W 62–58	20–3 (10–0)	16 – Lewis	11 – Saxen	9 – Marčiulionis	University Credit Union Pavilion (3,500); Moraga, CA
February 6, 2025; 6:00 p.m., ESPN2		at San Francisco	L 64–65	20–4 (10–1)	20 – Marčiulionis	11 – Saxen	7 – Marčiulionis	Sobrato Center (3,200); San Francisco, CA
February 8, 2025; 7:00 p.m., ESPN2		at Oregon State	W 63–49	21–4 (11–1)	18 – Marčiulionis	7 – Saxen	10 – Marčiulionis	Gill Coliseum (5,256); Corvallis, OR
February 11, 2025; 8:00 p.m., ESPN2		Santa Clara	W 73–64	22–4 (12–1)	24 – Marčiulionis	8 – Saxen	6 – Marčiulionis	University Credit Union Pavilion (3,500); Moraga, CA
February 15, 2025; 7:00 p.m., ESPN2		Washington State	W 77–56	23–4 (13–1)	30 – Murauskas	10 – Murauskas	7 – Marčiulionis	University Credit Union Pavilion (3,500); Moraga, CA
February 19, 2025; 7:00 p.m., ESPN+		Portland	W 79–66	24–4 (14–1)	20 – Murauskas	11 – Murauskas	9 – Marčiulionis	University Credit Union Pavilion (3,392); Moraga, CA
February 22, 2025; 5:00 p.m., ESPN2		at Gonzaga; Rivalry	W 74–67	25–4 (15–1)	18 – Lewis	9 – Saxen	6 – Marčiulionis	McCarthey Athletic Center (6,000); Spokane, WA
February 27, 2025; 8:00 p.m., CBSSN	No. 23	at Loyola Marymount	W 58–55	26–4 (16–1)	18 – Murauskas	12 – Murauskas	3 – Tied	Gersten Pavilion (1,609); Los Angeles, CA
March 1, 2025; 7:00 p.m., CBSSN	No. 23	Oregon State	W 74–64	27–4 (17–1)	25 – Marčiulionis	11 – Saxen	7 – Marčiulionis	University Credit Union Pavilion (3,500); Moraga, CA
WCC tournament
March 10, 2025; 6:00 p.m., ESPN	(1) No. 19	vs. (9) Pepperdine; Semifinals	W 74–59	28–4	15 – Tied	10 – Murauskas	5 – Marčiulionis	Orleans Arena (4,650); Paradise, NV
March 11, 2025; 6:00 p.m., ESPN	(1) No. 19	vs. (2) Gonzaga; Championship	L 51–58	28–5	20 – Saxen	9 – Tied	8 – Marčiulionis	Orleans Arena (6,237); Paradise, NV
NCAA tournament
March 21, 2025*; 12:15 p.m., TruTV	(7 E) No. 20	vs. (10 E) Vanderbilt; First Round	W 59–56	29–5	15 – Ross	11 – Saxen	3 – Ross	Rocket Arena (15,985); Cleveland, OH
March 23, 2025*; 3:10 p.m., TNT	(7 E) No. 20	vs. (2 E) No. 7 Alabama; Second Round	L 66–80	29–6	15 – Saxen	8 – Wessels	4 – Marčiulionis	Rocket Arena (15,791); Cleveland, OH
*Non-conference game. ^{#}Rankings from AP poll. (#) Tournament seedings in parentheses. E=East. All times are in Pacific Time.

== Rankings ==
Ranking movements Legend: ██ Increase in ranking ██ Decrease in ranking — = Not ranked RV = Received votes
	Week																				
Poll	Pre	1	2	3	4	5	6	7	8	9	10	11	12	13	14	15	16	17	18	19	Final
AP	RV	—	—	RV	RV	RV	—	—	—	—	RV	RV	RV	RV	RV	RV	23	21	19	20	24
Coaches	RV	RV	RV	RV	RV	RV	—	—	—	—	RV	RV	RV	23	RV	24	20	17	15	19	22
