= 2021–22 Saint Mary's Gaels men's basketball team =

2021–22 Saint Mary's Gaels men's basketball

NCAA tournament, Second Round
- Conference: West Coast Conference

Ranking
- Coaches: No. 20
- AP: No. 18
- Record: 26–8 (12–3 WCC)
- Head coach: Randy Bennett (21st season)
- Assistant coaches: Marcus Schroeder; Justin Joyner; Mickey McConnell
- Home arena: University Credit Union Pavilion (Capacity: 3,500)

2021–22 West Coast Conference men's basketball standings
	Conf.				Overall
Team	W		L	PCT	W		L	PCT
No. 1 Gonzaga †	13	–	1	.929	28	–	4	.875
No. 18 Saint Mary's	12	–	3	.800	26	–	8	.765
Santa Clara	10	–	5	.667	21	–	12	.636
San Francisco	10	–	6	.625	24	–	10	.706
BYU	9	–	6	.600	24	–	11	.686
Portland	7	–	7	.500	19	–	15	.559
San Diego	7	–	9	.438	15	–	16	.484
Pacific	3	–	11	.214	8	–	22	.267
Loyola Marymount	3	–	12	.200	11	–	18	.379
Pepperdine	1	–	15	.063	7	–	25	.219
† 2022 WCC tournament winner Rankings from AP poll

The 2021–22 Saint Mary's Gaels men's basketball team represented Saint Mary's College of California during the 2021–22 NCAA Division I men's basketball season. The team were led by head coach Randy Bennett in his 21st season at Saint Mary's. The Gaels played their home games at the University Credit Union Pavilion (Note: Formerly known as McKeon Pavilion.) in Moraga, California, as members of the West Coast Conference (WCC). They finished the season 26–8, 12–3 in WCC play to finish in second place. As the No. 2 seed in WCC tournament, they defeated Santa Clara in the semifinals, before losing to Gonzaga in the Championship. They received an at-large bid to the NCAA tournament as the No. 5 seed in the East Region, where they defeated Indiana in the first round before losing to UCLA in the second round.

== Previous season ==
The Gaels finished the 2020–21 season 14–10, 4–6 in WCC play to finish in seventh place. They defeated Loyola Marymount before losing to Gonzaga in the semifinals of the WCC tournament. They received an at-large bid to the NIT where they lost to Western Kentucky in the first round.

== Offseason ==
=== Departures ===
There were no Saint Mary's players that departed or transferred.

=== 2021 recruiting class ===
College recruiting information
Name	Hometown	School	Height	Weight	Commit date
Chris Howell #38 PF	San Marcos, CA	Torrey Pines High School	6 ft 5 in (1.96 m)	185 lb (84 kg)	Sep 25, 2020
Chris Howell #38 PF	Recruit ratings: Scout: Rivals: (81)				
Augustas Marčiulionis; PG	Vilnius, Lithuania	BC Rytas Vilnius	6 ft 4 in (1.93 m)	181 lb (82 kg)	May 16, 2021
Augustas Marčiulionis; PG	Recruit ratings: Scout: Rivals: (NR)				
Overall recruit ranking: Scout: nr Rivals: nr ESPN: nr
Note: In many cases, Scout, Rivals, 247Sports, On3, and ESPN may conflict in their listings of height and weight.; In these cases, the average was taken. ESPN grades are on a 100-point scale.; Sources: "ESPN". ESPN.; "2021 Team Ranking". Rivals.

== Roster ==
2021–22 Saint Mary's Gaels men's basketball team
Players
Coaches

Pos.	#	Name	Height	Weight	Year	Previous school	Hometown
G	0	Logan Johnson	6 ft 2 in (1.88 m)	170 lb (77 kg)	Sr	Saint Francis HS; Cincinnati	Mountain View, California
G	1	Yigit Arcan (W)	6 ft 2 in (1.88 m)	170 lb (77 kg)	Fr	None	Istanbul, Turkey
G	2	Quinn Clinton	6 ft 3 in (1.91 m)	185 lb (84 kg)	RS Jr	Christchurch Boys HS	Christchurch, New Zealand
G	3	Augustas Marčiulionis	6 ft 4 in (1.93 m)	185 lb (84 kg)	Fr	Rytas Vilnius	Vilnius, Lithuania
G	5	Jabe Mullins	6 ft 5 in (1.96 m)	190 lb (86 kg)	So	Mount Si HS	Snoqualmie, Washington
C	10	Mitchell Saxen	6 ft 10 in (2.08 m)	230 lb (104 kg)	So	Ingraham HS	Seattle, Washington
F/C	11	Matthias Tass	6 ft 10 in (2.08 m)	245 lb (111 kg)	Sr	Tallinn Secondary School of Science	Tallinn, Estonia
G	12	Tommy Kuhse	6 ft 2 in (1.88 m)	185 lb (84 kg)	RS Sr	Mountain View HS	Mesa, Arizona
F	14	Kyle Bowen	6 ft 8 in (2.03 m)	225 lb (102 kg)	Jr	Centre of Excellence	Perth, Australia
G	15	Chris Howell	6 ft 6 in (1.98 m)	185 lb (84 kg)	Fr	Torrey Pines HS	San Diego, California
C	22	Matt Van Komen	7 ft 4 in (2.24 m)	250 lb (113 kg)	Jr	Pleasant Grove HS; Utah	Pleasant Grove, Utah
G	23	Leemet Böckler	6 ft 6 in (1.98 m)	215 lb (98 kg)	So	Tallinn Tech	Tallinn, Estonia
F	25	Judah Brown	6 ft 6 in (1.98 m)	205 lb (93 kg)	So	Pacifica Christian HS	Bermuda Dunes, California
G/F	33	Luke Barrett (W)	6 ft 6 in (1.98 m)	190 lb (86 kg)	RS Fr	Piedmont HS	Piedmont, California
F	42	Dan Fotu	6 ft 7 in (2.01 m)	225 lb (102 kg)	Sr	Rangitoto College	Auckland, New Zealand
G/F	44	Alex Ducas	6 ft 6 in (1.98 m)	215 lb (98 kg)	Jr	Centre of Excellence	Geraldton, Australia

Head coach

- Randy Bennett (UC San Diego)

Assistant coach(es)

- Marcus Schroeder (Princeton)
- Justin Joyner (UC Santa Barbara)
- Mickey McConnell (Saint Mary's)

Legend

- (C) Team captain
- (S) Suspended
- (I) Ineligible
- (W) Walk-on
- Injured
- Current redshirt

Roster

== Schedule and results ==
Date time, TV	Rank^{#}	Opponent^{#}	Result	Record	Site (attendance) city, state
Non-conference regular season
November 9, 2021*; 7:00 p.m., WCC Network		Prairie View A&M	W 87–68	1–0	University Credit Union Pavilion (2,283); Moraga, CA
November 12, 2021*; 7:00 p.m., WCC Network		Texas Southern	W 67–58	2–0	University Credit Union Pavilion (2,602); Moraga, CA
November 15, 2021*; 7:00 p.m., WCC Network		Southern Utah	W 70–51	3–0	University Credit Union Pavilion (2,031); Moraga, CA
November 17, 2021*; 7:00 p.m., WCC Network		Bellarmine	W 73–64	4–0	University Credit Union Pavilion (2,265); Moraga, CA
November 22, 2021*; 8:30 p.m., ESPN2		vs. Notre Dame; Maui Invitational tournament quarterfinals	W 62–59	5–0	Michelob Ultra Arena; Paradise, NV
November 23, 2021*; 5:00 p.m., ESPN		vs. Oregon; Maui Invitational Tournament semifinal	W 62–50	6–0	Michelob Ultra Arena; Paradise, NV
November 24, 2021*; 2:00 p.m, ESPN		vs. Wisconsin; Maui Invitational Tournament championship	L 55–61	6–1	Michelob Ultra Arena (2,901); Paradise, NV
November 29, 2021*; 7:00 p.m., WCC Network		UC Riverside	W 67–50	7–1	University Credit Union Pavilion (2,594); Moraga, CA
December 2, 2021*; 6:00 p.m., CBSSN		at Utah State	W 60–58	8–1	Smith Spectrum (8,888); Logan, UT
December 4, 2021*; 1:00 p.m., Stadium		at Colorado State	L 58–74	8–2	Moby Arena (7,004); Fort Collins, CO
December 11, 2021*; 3:00 p.m., WCC Network		UC Santa Barbara	W 80–59	9–2	University Credit Union Pavilion (3,019); Moraga, CA
December 14, 2021*; 7:00 p.m., WCC Network		Stanislaus State	W 76–39	10–2	University Credit Union Pavilion (631); Moraga, CA
December 17, 2021*; 7:00 p.m., FloHoops		vs. San Diego State; Jerry Colangelo Classic	L 53–63	10–3	Footprint Center (1,500); Phoenix, AZ
December 22, 2021*; 7:00 p.m., SCS Atlantic		Missouri State	W 75–58	11–3	University Credit Union Pavilion (2,716); Moraga, CA
December 28, 2021*; 7:00 p.m., SCS Atlantic		Yale	W 87–60	12–3	University Credit Union Pavilion (2,904); Moraga, CA
WCC regular season
January 8, 2022; 7:00 p.m., ESPN2		at BYU	L 43–52	12–4 (0–1)	Marriott Center (17,544); Provo, UT
January 13, 2022; 8:00 p.m., NBCSBA		at Pepperdine	W 77–62	13–4 (1–1)	Firestone Fieldhouse (580); Malibu, CA
January 15, 2022; 4:30 p.m., NBCSCA		Pacific	Canceled		University Credit Union Pavilion; Moraga, CA
January 20, 2022; 6:00 p.m., CBSSN		Santa Clara	W 73–65	14–4 (2–1)	University Credit Union Pavilion (3,056); Moraga, CA
January 22, 2022; 7:00 p.m., ESPNU		at Loyola Marymount	W 83–51	15–4 (3–1)	Gersten Pavilion (1,027); Los Angeles, CA
January 27, 2022; 7:00 p.m., Stadium		at San Francisco	W 72–70	16–4 (4–1)	War Memorial Gymnasium (2,833); San Francisco, CA
January 29, 2022; 5:00 p.m., CBSSN		Pepperdine	W 81–57	17–4 (5–1)	University Credit Union Pavilion (3,029); Moraga, CA
February 3, 2022; 8:00 p.m., NBCSCA		at Portland	W 75–54	18–4 (6–1)	Chiles Center (1,113); Portland, OR
February 5, 2022; 7:00 p.m., CBSSN		Loyola Marymount	W 71–60	19–4 (7–1)	University Credit Union Pavilion (3,044); Moraga, CA
February 8, 2022; 8:00 p.m., ESPNU	No. 22	at Santa Clara; Rescheduled from Jan. 6	L 72–77	19–5 (7–2)	Leavey Center (1,714); Santa Clara, CA
February 10, 2022; 6:00 p.m., NBCSCA	No. 22	San Diego	W 86–57	20–5 (8–2)	University Credit Union Pavilion (2,763); Moraga, CA
February 12, 2022; 7:00 p.m., ESPN2	No. 22	at No. 2 Gonzaga; Rivalry	L 58–74	20–6 (8–3)	McCarthey Athletic Center (6,000); Spokane, WA
February 17, 2022; 7:00 p.m., NBCSBA+		San Francisco; Rescheduled from Jan. 1	W 69–64	21–6 (9–3)	University Credit Union Pavilion (3,500); Moraga, CA
February 19, 2022; 7:00 p.m., ESPN2		BYU	W 69–64	22–6 (10–3)	University Credit Union Pavilion (3,500); Moraga, CA
February 24, 2022; 7:00 p.m., Stadium	No. 23	at San Diego	W 60–46	23–6 (11–3)	Jenny Craig Pavilion (1,043); San Diego, CA
February 26, 2022; 7:00 p.m., ESPN	No. 23	No. 1 Gonzaga; Rivalry	W 67–57	24–6 (12–3)	University Credit Union Pavilion (3,500); Moraga, CA
WCC tournament
March 7, 2022*; 8:30 p.m., ESPN2	(2) No. 17	vs. (3) Santa Clara; Semifinals	W 75–72	25–6	Orleans Arena; Paradise, NV
March 8, 2022*; 6:00 p.m., ESPN	(2) No. 17	vs. (1) No. 1 Gonzaga; Championship	L 69–82	25–7	Orleans Arena; Paradise, NV
NCAA tournament
March 17, 2022*; 4:20 p.m., TBS	(5 E) No. 18	vs. (12 E) Indiana; First Round	W 82–53	26–7	Moda Center; Portland, OR
March 19, 2022*; 4:10 p.m., TBS	(5 E) No. 18	vs. (4 E) No. 11 UCLA; Second Round	L 56–72	26–8	Moda Center (17,907); Portland, OR
*Non-conference game. ^{#}Rankings from AP Poll. (#) Tournament seedings in parentheses. All times are in Pacific Time.

== Rankings ==
Ranking movements Legend: ██ Increase in ranking ██ Decrease in ranking — = Not ranked RV = Received votes т = Tied with team above or below
	Week																			
Poll	Pre	1	2	3	4	5	6	7	8	9	10	11	12	13	14	15	16	17	18	Final
AP	—	—	—	—	—	—	—	—	—	—	—	RV	RV	22	RV	23	19	17	18	Not released
Coaches	—	—^	—	—	—	RV	RV	RV	RV	—	—	RV	RV	22	RV	23	20	17	16т	20

*AP does not release post-NCAA Tournament rankings.
^Coaches did not release a Week 1 poll.
