= Steve Gray (basketball) =

American basketball player

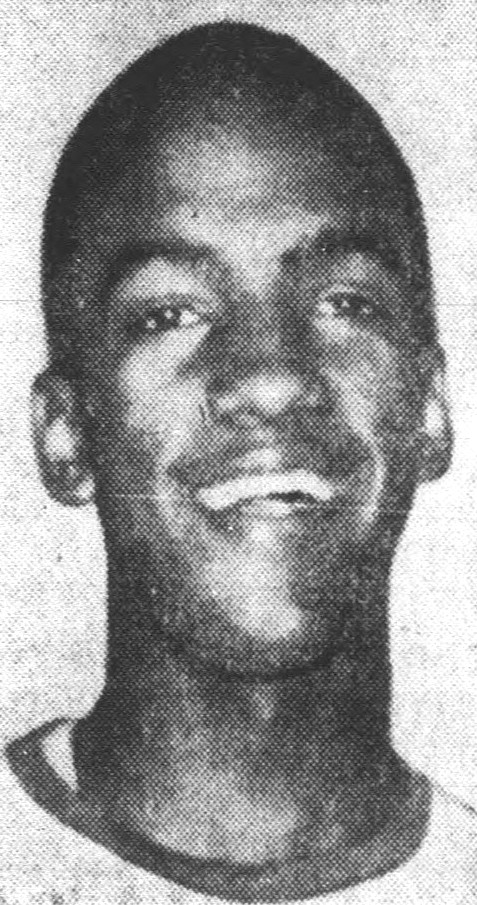
- Gray, circa 1963

Personal information
- Born: c. 1941 (age 84–85)
- Listed height: 6 ft 4 in (1.93 m)
- Listed weight: 190 lb (86 kg)

Career information
- High school: George Washington (San Francisco, California)
- College: Saint Mary's (1960–1963)
- NBA draft: 1963: 3rd round, 21st overall pick
- Drafted by: San Francisco Warriors
- Position: Shooting guard

Career highlights
- 2× WCAC Player of the Year (1962, 1963); 2× First-team All-WCAC (1962, 1963); Second-team All-WCAC (1961); California Mr. Basketball (1959)
- Stats at Basketball Reference

Steve Gray (born c. 1941) is a retired American basketball player. He was a two-time West Coast Athletic Conference player of the year at Saint Mary's College.

A 6'4 guard, Steve Gray was named California Mr. Basketball as a senior at George Washington High School in San Francisco in 1959.

Gray played collegiately at Saint Mary's College from 1960 to 1963 and is one of the best players in Gaels' history. He was a three-time all-conference pick in the WCAC (now called the West Coast Conference). His freshman year, Gray averaged 11.9 points and 7.8 rebounds per game as he teamed with forward Tom Meschery to lead the Gaels to a 19–7 record. The next two years, Gray was the premier player in the conference. As a junior, he averaged 20.3 points and 11.9 rebounds per game and shared WCAC player of the year honors with Pepperdine's Harry Dinnel. As a senior, Gray set a school record by averaging 23.8 points per game and was again named conference player of the year. He finished his career with 1,390 points and 745 rebounds.

Following his college career, Gray was drafted by the San Francisco Warriors in the third round (21st pick overall) of the 1963 NBA draft, but never played in the National Basketball Association.

Steve Gray was inducted into the Saint Mary's athletic hall of fame in 1973. During the 2007–08 season, Saint Mary's named their top 25 players all time as a part of the 100th anniversary of basketball at the school. Gray was named the #4 player in SMC history.
