= Mickey McConnell =

American basketball player and coach

Saint Mary's Gaels
- Title: Head coach
- Conference: West Coast Conference

Personal information
- Born: April 14, 1989 (age 37) Mesa, Arizona, U.S.
- Listed height: 6 ft 0 in (1.83 m)
- Listed weight: 180 lb (82 kg)

Career information
- High school: Dobson (Mesa, Arizona)
- College: Saint Mary's (2007–2011)
- NBA draft: 2011: undrafted
- Playing career: 2011–2019
- Position: Point guard
- Coaching career: 2019–present

Career history

Playing
- 2011–2012: Fileni Jesi
- 2012–2013: Tezenis Verona
- 2013–2014: Texas Legends
- 2014–2015: Telekom Baskets Bonn
- 2015–2016: Champagne Châlons-Reims Basket
- 2016–2017: Río Natura Monbús Obradoiro
- 2017–2018: EWE Baskets Oldenburg
- 2018–2019: Élan Béarnais Pau-Lacq-Orthez

Coaching
- 2019–2022: Saint Mary's (assistant)
- 2022–2026: Saint Mary's (associate HC)
- 2026–present: Saint Mary's

Career highlights
- WCC Player of the Year (2011); 2× First-team All-WCC (2010, 2011)
- Stats at Basketball Reference

Richard Barton "Mickey" McConnell (born April 14, 1989) is an American former professional basketball player and coach who is the head coach of the Saint Mary's Gaels men's basketball team of the West Coast Conference (WCC). He previously served as an assistant coach and associate head coach for the program. He played college basketball for the Gaels, where he was named West Coast Conference Men's Basketball Player of the Year in 2011. McConnell was also selected in the 31st round of the 2011 MLB Draft by the Los Angeles Dodgers.

== Early life ==
McConnell was born on April 14, 1989, in Mesa, Arizona, to Pam and Rick McConnell. Rick McConnell is the head basketball coach at Dobson High School and was a member of the University of Arizona's 1976 College World Series Championship baseball team. Mickey's older brother Matt played baseball in the Philadelphia Phillies minor league organization. Their grandfather Dick has the most wins in Arizona high school basketball history. The youngest McConnell received the nickname "Mickey" as a homage to Mickey Mantle.

== High school career ==
He attended Dobson High School and was coached by his father. In his Dobson career, McConnell scored a school record 1,650 points while dishing out a school record 545 assists. As a junior, he averaged 21.0 points, 6.0 assists, and 4.0 rebounds per game as the Mustangs notched a 19–12 record. McConnell shot 48% from the perimeter and led the East Valley 5A conference in scoring, 3-point percentage, and assists. The Mustangs reached the 2006 Arizona high school playoffs before losing to Corona del Sol High School. Following the season he was selected to the East Valley 5A All-Region team.

In McConnell's senior year, he posted averages of 20.6 points, 7.4 assists, 3.7 rebounds, and 3.0 steals per game in leading Dobson to a 23–7 record and state playoff appearance. The Arizona Republic named him to the First Team All State, and he was an East Valley 5A All-Region team selection. He originally signed with New Mexico, but opted out of his letter of intent after coach Ritchie McKay was fired. After considering UC Irvine, University of San Diego, and division 1 baseball options McConnell committed to Saint Mary's on April 28, 2007. He chose the Gaels because, in his own words, "I liked the whole environment and the rise of the program. It was just a good fit for me as far as the family culture atmosphere. I thought it was the best place for me to go to be successful."

In addition to his basketball exploits, McConnell was a star shortstop on the baseball team. He hit .445 with 3 home runs and 25 stolen bases his senior year. He holds the school record for stolen bases with 54 and is second all time in hits (101) and sixth in home runs (4). In his senior year, he was an 5A All-State Selection.

College recruiting
Name	Hometown	School	Height	Weight	Commit date
Mickey McConnell; Point guard	Mesa, Arizona	Dobson (AZ)	6 ft 0 in (1.83 m)	175 lb (79 kg)	Apr 28, 2007
Mickey McConnell; Point guard	Recruit ratings: Rivals:				
Overall recruit ranking:
Note: In many cases, Scout, Rivals, 247Sports, On3, and ESPN may conflict in their listings of height and weight.; In these cases, the average was taken. ESPN grades are on a 100-point scale.; Sources: "St. Mary's Basketball Commitments". Rivals.; "2007 St. Mary's Basketball Commits". Scout.; "Scout.com Team Recruiting Rankings". Scout.; "2007 Team Ranking". Rivals.

== College career ==
=== Freshman ===
McConnell seldom played as a freshman, averaging 1.0 points per game in 6.4 minutes per game of playing time. He scored a season-high five points and grabbed three rebounds against Cal State Bakersfield. The Gaels finished the season 25–7, and made the NCAA Tournament as a ten seed.

=== Sophomore ===
In his sophomore campaign, McConnell increased his averages to 5.4 points and 21.3 minutes per game. He scored in excess of 10 points on five occasions. He recorded his first collegiate 20 point night on February 14, 2009, in a 75–68 win over Portland. In the February 21 ESPN BracketBusters matchup versus Utah State, McConnell started in place of injured Australian guard Patty Mills and registered a season-high 22 points. He shot 6-for-6 from the field and 9-for-11 from the foul line as the Gaels earned a 75–64 victory. McConnell helped the Gaels go 28–7 and advance to the quarterfinals of the National Invitation Tournament.

=== Junior ===
McConnell averaged 13.8 points and 5.1 assists per game as a junior. Over the course of the regular season, McConnell led the nation in three-point shooting with a 51.5% efficiency (minimum 2.0 attempts per game and 75% of games played). He hit a total of 77 threes, tied for fourth most in a single season in Gael history. He shot 51.4% overall in West Coast Conference play, eighth best in the league. McConnell's average of 13.7 points per game in conference ranked tenth in the West Coast Conference, and his 5.3 assists per game was third. He dished out a total of 174 assists on the year, the fourth best single season mark for a Gael. McConnell led the team with 50 steals and his 1.5 steals per game was fifth in the WCC in that statistic. In a blowout of the Howard Bison on December 30, McConnell registered his first double-double as he posted 11 points and 11 assists.

He led the team to a 28–6 finish, a ten seed in the NCAA Tournament, and a berth in the Sweet Sixteen. McConnell was named Most Valuable Player of the 2010 West Coast Conference men's basketball tournament as he matched his season high with 26 points to help Saint Mary's defeat Gonzaga in the championship game. In the NCAA Tournament, he connected on 5-of-9 attempts from beyond the arc and scored 23 points in an 80–71 first round victory over the Richmond Spiders. McConnell had 15 points in the 75–68 Round of 32 win over Villanova and banked in the go-ahead three-point shot with 1:55 to play. He was named to the All-West Coast Conference Team at the conclusion of the season. He was recognized as an All-Ninth District second-team selection by the National Association of Basketball Coaches.

=== Senior ===
Prior to his senior year, McConnell was named to the preseason All-West Coast Conference Team. He was on the preseason watchlist for the Bob Cousy Award honoring the top point guard in college basketball. Jeff Goodman ranked him the #13 shooter in college basketball. McConnell was named to the South Padre Island Invitational All-Tournament Team after leading Saint Mary's to the championship game against BYU. In back-to-back victories against Mississippi State and Hartford, he posted a double-double (28 points and 13 assists) and then 21 points and seven assists, respectively. This earned him West Coast Conference Player of the Week and TheHoopsReport.com National Player of the Week honors for the week of December 28 – January 3. For the second straight week McConnell was recognized as West Coast Conference Player of the Week after leading the team to wins against Loyola Marymount and Pepperdine. On January 27, McConnell contributed 27 points and hit the game-winning shot with 1.2 seconds remaining to defeat the Gonzaga Bulldogs. The victory was the first for head coach Randy Bennett at the Bulldogs' home, the McCarthey Athletic Center, and the first by a Gaels team since 1995. McConnell scored a career-high 32 points in a loss to Portland on January 29. These performances earned him his third West Coast Conference Player of the Week honors. After victories over Santa Clara and San Francisco, McConnell was named West Coast Conference Player of the Week for the fourth time on February 14. McConnell was on midseason watchlist for Naismith College Player of the Year.

Saint Mary's went 25–9 in McConnell's senior season, captured a share of the West Coast Conference regular season title with an 11–3 record, and reached the 2011 National Invitation Tournament. In the first round of the NIT, Saint Mary's was upset by Kent State 71–70. At the end of the season, McConnell garnered West Coast Conference Men's Basketball Player of the Year honors as well as repeating on the All-West Coast Conference Team. He was among the final ten candidates for the Bob Cousy Award. He was recognized as an All-Ninth District first-team selection by the National Association of Basketball Coaches. The U.S. Basketball Writers Association named McConnell to the 10-man All-District IX team covering college basketball players in the states of California, Oregon, Washington, Hawaii, Arizona, and Alaska. He was picked to the Fourth Team All-America and Mid-Major All-America Team by Fox Sports. McConnell was named an Honorable Mention All-American by the Associated Press.

McConnell finished his career with 1,234 points, 12th most in Saint Mary's history. He is also second in assists and third in three-pointers made. Head coach Randy Bennett said that, of all the players he coached, McConnell improved the most.

== Professional career ==
The Los Angeles Dodgers drafted McConnell on the third day in the 31st round with the 944th overall pick in the 2011 MLB First Year Player Draft. The pick completely surprised McConnell, who had not played baseball since high school. "In the summers I would hit a little bit and do minor baseball stuff with my brother but nothing serious or organized," he said. A Dodgers scout said that the pick was not a publicity stunt, and he believed that McConnell had a career in baseball. McConnell affirmed that he was committed to basketball, in the NBA or overseas, but would not rule out becoming a professional baseball player in the future.

McConnell signed with Fileni Jesi of Italy's Legadue Basket for the 2011–12 season. In Jesi, McConnell averaged 17.6 points and 3.4 assists.

In 2012, he signed with Tezenis Verona for the 2012–13 season.

On September 10, 2013, he signed with the Dallas Mavericks. However, he was waived on October 26. In November 2013, he was acquired by the Texas Legends.

On August 11, 2014, he signed with Telekom Baskets Bonn of Germany for the 2014–15 season. In Bonn, he averaged 7.7 points and 3.6 assists over 19 minutes per game in Eurocup action and 8.6 points per game with 3.8 assists in 22 minutes per game in the regular season.

McConnell would join his home state Phoenix Suns for the July 2015 Las Vegas Summer League squad averaging 4.3 points and 2.3 assists per game in 18.9 min per game. After Summer League, McConnell signed with Châlons-Reims.

On July 18, 2016, McConnell signed with the Spanish team Obradoiro CAB. McConnell finished the season averaging 11.2 PPG and led the ACB in assists with 6.5 APG.

For the 2017–18 campaign, McConnell signed with EWE Baskets Oldenburg of the Bundesliga.

He spent the 2018–19 season in Élan Béarnais Pau-Lacq-Orthez, averaging 13 points, 5 assists and 3 rebounds and 35 minutes. On June 20, 2019, the club announced during a press conference that he would join the basketball staff of its university Saint Mary's College of California.

== The Basketball tournament ==
Mickey McConnell played for Team Gael Force in the 2018 edition of The Basketball Tournament. In three games, he had 11.3 points per game, 3.7 rebounds per game and 5.0 assists per game. Team Gael Force made it to the Super 16 before falling to eventual tournament runner-up Eberlein Drive.

== Coaching career ==
In July 2019, McConnell joined the coaching staff at his alma mater as an assistant coach. He was promoted to associate head coach in 2022.

On March 23, 2026, McConnell was named head coach of Saint Mary's after longtime head coach Randy Bennett left to become head coach at Arizona State.

== Personal life ==
He is married to the former Meagan Densberger, who he met at Saint Mary's.

== Statistics ==
=== NCAA ===
College statistics

Legend
GP	Games played	GS	Games started	MPG	Minutes per game
FG%	Field goal percentage	3P%	3-point field goal percentage	FT%	Free throw percentage
RPG	Rebounds per game	APG	Assists per game	SPG	Steals per game
BPG	Blocks per game	PPG	Points per game	**Bold**	Career high

Year	Team	GP	GS	MPG	FG%	3P%	FT%	RPG	APG	SPG	BPG	PPG
2007–08	Saint Mary's	21	0	6.4	.333	.300	.455	0.5	0.9	0.0	0.1	1.0
2008–09	Saint Mary's	**35**	13	21.3	.421	.405	.743	1.3	2.1	0.6	0.1	5.4
2009–10	Saint Mary's	34	**34**	36.1	**.508**	**.510**	.841	2.4	5.1	**1.5**	**0.2**	13.8
2010–11	Saint Mary's	34	**34**	**37.0**	.504	.456	**.887**	**2.5**	**6.1**	1.2	**0.2**	**16.4**
