= 2009–10 Portland Pilots men's basketball team =

American college basketball season

2009–10 Portland Pilots men's basketball
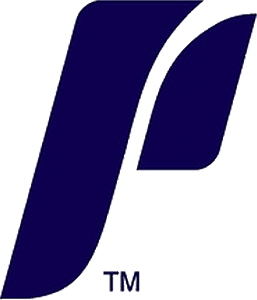

CollegeInsider.com Tournament, 1st Round
- Conference: West Coast Conference
- Record: 21–11 (10–4 WCC)
- Head coach: Eric Reveno (4th season)
- Assistant coaches: Joel Sobotka; Eric Jackson; Michael Wolf
- Home arena: Chiles Center

2009–10 West Coast Conference men's basketball standings
	Conf.				Overall
Team	W		L	PCT	W		L	PCT
No. 22 Gonzaga	12	–	2	.857	27	–	7	.794
Saint Mary's†	11	–	3	.786	28	–	6	.824
Portland	10	–	4	.714	21	–	11	.656
San Francisco	7	–	7	.500	12	–	18	.400
Loyola Marymount	7	–	7	.500	18	–	16	.529
San Diego	3	–	11	.214	11	–	21	.344
Santa Clara	3	–	11	.214	11	–	21	.344
Pepperdine	3	–	11	.214	7	–	24	.226
† Conference tournament winner Rankings from AP poll

The 2009–10 Portland Pilots men's basketball team represented the University of Portland in the 2009–10 NCAA Division I men's basketball season. The Pilots were members of the West Coast Conference (WCC) and were led by fourth-year head coach Eric Reveno. They played their home games at the Chiles Center. They finished the season with 21–11, 10–4 in WCC play. The Pilots lost in the semifinals in the WCC tournament to Saint Mary's. They were invited to the 2010 CollegeInsider.com Tournament which they lost to Northern Colorado in the first round.

== Roster ==
Name	Number	Pos.	Height	Weight	Year	Hometown	High School/Last College
Eric Waterford	1	G	6' 1"	180	Sophomore	Modesto, California	St. Thomas More School
Ethan Niedermeyer	3	F	6' 6"	200	Senior	Lafayette, California	De La Salle HS
Taishi Ito	5	G	6' 0"	180	Senior	Mie, Japan	Montrose Christian School
Cody Mivshek	10	G	6' 2"	180	Freshman	Fort Collins, Colorado	Fossil Ridge HS/Phillips Exter Acad.
Robin Smeulders	11	F	6' 10"	230	Senior	Braunschweig, Germany	Hoffmann von Fallersleben Gymnasium
Nik Raivio	15	G	6' 4"	190	Senior	Vancouver, Washington	Mountain View HS/Santa Rosa JC
Jared Stohl	20	G	6' 1"	165	Junior	Marysville, Washington	Marysville Pilchuck HS
Nemanja Mitrovic	33	G	6' 5"	200	Sophomore	Toronto, Ontario	Northern Secondary School
Ryan Schaefer	35	F	6' 9"	220	Freshman	Corrales, New Mexico	Bosque High School
Luke Sikma	43	F	6' 8"	235	Junior	Bellevue, Washington	Bellevue HS
T. J. Campbell	44	G	5' 9"	190	Senior	Phoenix, Arizona	Sunnyslope HS/Glendale CC
Kramer Knutson	45	F/C	6' 9"	220	Junior	Mesa, Arizona	Dobson HS
Jasonn Hannibal	55	C	6' 10"	270	Junior	Mississauga, Ontario	Port Credit Secondary

== 2009–10 Schedule and results ==
Date time, TV	Rank^{#}	Opponent^{#}	Result	Record	Site (attendance) city, state
Exhibition
10/29/2009*; 7:00pm		Concordia	W 106–78	–	Chiles Center (1,309); Portland, OR
11/07/2009*; 7:00pm		Linfield	W 91–56	–	Chiles Center (1,433); Portland, OR
Non-conference regular season
11/14/2009*; 1:00pm		at Eastern Washington	W 64–58	1–0	Reese Court (1,522); Cheney, WA
11/17/2009*; 7:00pm		Seattle	W 98–81	2–0	Chiles Center (1,336); Portland, OR
11/21/2009*; 7:00pm		Oregon	W 88–81	3–0	Chiles Center (3,386); Portland, OR
11/26/2009*; 7:30pm, ESPN2		vs. UCLA; 76 Classic Quarterfinals	W 74–47	4–0	Anaheim Convention Center (2,697); Anaheim, CA
11/27/2009*; 6:30pm, ESPNU		vs. No. 22 Minnesota; 76 Classic Semifinals	W 61–56	5–0	Anaheim Convention Center (N/A); Anaheim, CA
11/29/2009*; 7:00pm, ESPN2		vs. No. 8 West Virginia; 76 Classic Championship Game	L 66–84	5–1	Anaheim Convention Center (2,057); Anaheim, CA
12/02/2009*; 7:00pm	No. 25	Portland State	L 82–86	5–2	Chiles Center (2,413); Portland, OR
12/06/2009*; 5:00pm	No. 25	at Idaho	L 48–68	5–3	Kibbie Dome (1,500); Moscow, ID
12/12/2009*; 1:00pm		Denver	W 72–62	6–3	Chiles Center (1,344); Portland, OR
12/19/2009*; 7:00pm, FSNNW		at No. 24 Washington	L 54–89	6–4	Bank of America Arena (9,275); Seattle, WA
12/22/2009*; 7:00pm		Idaho	W 82–52	7–4	Chiles Center (1,746); Portland, OR
12/28/2009*; 7:05pm		at Nevada	L 69–78	7–5	Lawlor Events Center (5,827); Reno, NV
12/31/2009*; 3:00pm		Evergreen State College	W 101–77	8–5	Chiles Center (1,205); Portland, OR
01/02/2010*; 2:00pm		Army	W 67–57	9–5	Chiles Center (1,681); Portland, OR
WCC regular season
01/09/2010; 7:00pm, ESPNU		No. 19 Gonzaga	L 78–81	9–6 (0–1)	Chiles Center (5,003); Portland, OR
01/14/2010; 7:30pm, CSNNW		at San Diego	W 63–54	10–6 (1–1)	Jenny Craig Pavilion (2,553); San Diego, CA
01/16/2010; 7:00pm, CSNNW		at Saint Mary's	L 72–77	10–7 (1–2)	McKeon Pavilion (3,500); Moraga, CA
01/21/2010; 7:00pm		Loyola Marymount	W 79–39	11–7 (2–2)	Chiles Center (1,533); Portland, OR
01/23/2010; 7:30pm		Pepperdine	W 80–64	12–7 (3–2)	Chiles Center (2,605); Portland, OR
01/28/2010; 8:00pm, ESPNU		at San Francisco	W 74–58	13–7 (4–2)	War Memorial Gymnasium (2,107); San Francisco, CA
01/29/2010; 7:00pm		at Santa Clara	W 74–52	14–7 (5–2)	Leavey Center (2,325); Santa Clara, CA
02/04/2010; 8:00pm, ESPN2		at No. 17 Gonzaga	L 49–76	14–8 (5–3)	McCarthey Athletic Center (6,000); Spokane, WA
02/11/2010; 8:00pm, ESPNU		San Diego	W 70–56	15–8 (6–3)	Chiles Center (1,790); Portland, OR
02/13/2010; 6:00pm, ESPN2		Saint Mary's	W 80–75 ^{OT}	16–8 (7–3)	Chiles Center (2,774); Portland, OR
02/18/2010; 5:00pm, PT		at Pepperdine	W 83–62	17–8 (8–3)	Firestone Fieldhouse (872); Malibu, CA
02/20/2010; 7:00pm		at Loyola Marymount	L 68–77 ^{OT}	17–9 (8–4)	Gersten Pavilion (3,844); Los Angeles, CA
02/25/2010; 7:00pm, CSNNW		San Francisco	W 70–59	18–9 (9–4)	Chiles Center (1,667); Portland, OR
02/27/2010; 8:00pm		Santa Clara	W 68–55	19–9 (10–4)	Chiles Center (2,528); Portland, OR
03/02/2010*; 7:00pm		Lewis–Clark State	W 72–49	20–9	Chiles Center (1,818); Portland, OR
2010 WCC tournament
03/06/2010; 8:30pm, CSNNW	(3)	vs. (6) San Diego; Quarterfinals	W 72–57	21–9	Orleans Arena (7,727); Las Vegas, NV
03/07/2010; 8:00pm, ESPN2	(3)	vs. (2) Saint Mary's; Semifinals	L 55–69	21–10	Orleans Arena (7,941); Las Vegas, NV
2010 CIT
03/17/2010*; 7:05pm		at Northern Colorado; First Round	L 73–81	21–11	Butler–Hancock Sports Pavilion (1,810); Greeley, CO
*Non-conference game. ^{#}Rankings from AP Poll. (#) Tournament seedings in parentheses. All times are in Pacific Time.
