= 2009–10 Saint Mary's Gaels men's basketball team =

American college basketball season

2009–10 Saint Mary's Gaels men's basketball

WCC Tournament champions

NCAA tournament, Sweet Sixteen
- Conference: West Coast Conference

Ranking
- Coaches: No. 19
- Record: 28–6 (11–3 WCC)
- Head coach: Randy Bennett
- Assistant coaches: Kyle Smith; David Patrick; Mark Campbell
- Home arena: McKeon Pavilion

2009–10 West Coast Conference men's basketball standings
	Conf.				Overall
Team	W		L	PCT	W		L	PCT
No. 22 Gonzaga	12	–	2	.857	27	–	7	.794
Saint Mary's†	11	–	3	.786	28	–	6	.824
Portland	10	–	4	.714	21	–	11	.656
San Francisco	7	–	7	.500	12	–	18	.400
Loyola Marymount	7	–	7	.500	18	–	16	.529
San Diego	3	–	11	.214	11	–	21	.344
Santa Clara	3	–	11	.214	11	–	21	.344
Pepperdine	3	–	11	.214	7	–	24	.226
† Conference tournament winner Rankings from AP poll

The 2009–10 Saint Mary's Gaels men's basketball team represented Saint Mary's College of California in the 2009–10 college basketball season, coached by Randy Bennett for the 9th consecutive year. The Gaels competed in the West Coast Conference and played their home games at the McKeon Pavilion. They finished conference play with a record of 11–3 to place second. They were the champions of the 2010 West Coast Conference men's basketball tournament and received the conference's automatic bid to the 2010 NCAA Division I men's basketball tournament, where they entered as the No. 10 seed in the South Region. Their first- round win over No. 7 seed Richmond was the school's first tournament win since beating Idaho State in 1959. They went on to beat No. 2 seed Villanova and advanced to the Sweet Sixteen, where they lost to No. 3 seed and AP No. 19 Baylor to end their season 28–6

.

== Roster ==
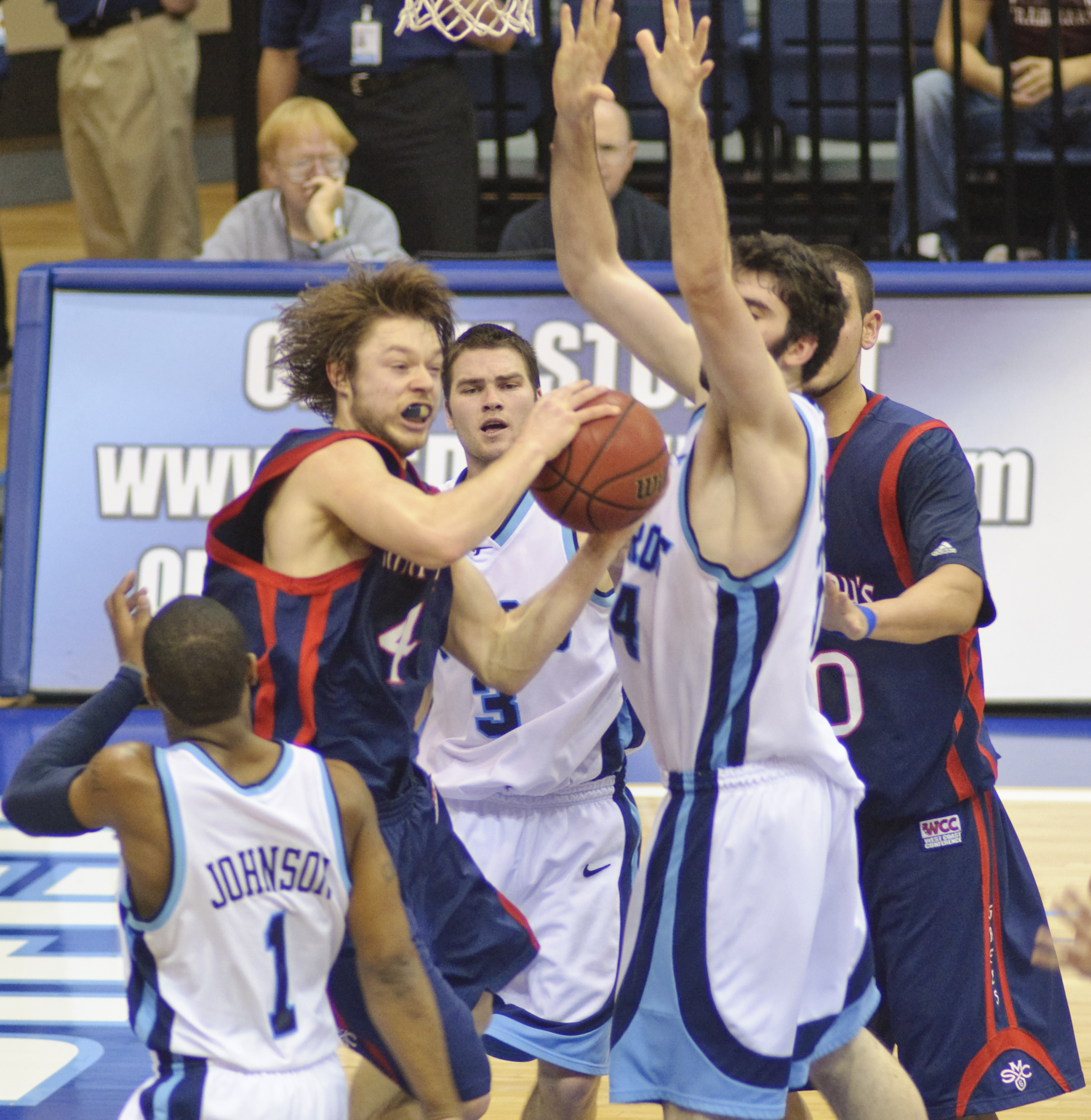
Matthew Dellavedova

#	Name	Height	Weight (lbs.)	Position	Class	Hometown	Previous Team(s)
1	Jorden Page	6'1"	175	G	Fr.	Maroochydore, Queensland, Australia	AIS
3	Mitchell Young	6'9"	225	F	Fr.	Logan, Queensland, Australia	AIS
4	Matthew Dellavedova	6'4"	185	G	Fr.	Maryborough, Victoria, Australia	AIS
11	Clint Steindl	6'7"	180	F	So.	Mackay, Queensland, Australia	AIS
12	Tim Harris	6'4"	190	F	Fr.	San Jose, CA, U.S.	Valley Christian HS
15	Beau Levesque	6'5"	215	F	Fr.	Lafayette, CA, U.S.	De La Salle HS
21	Ben Allen	6'11"	250	C	Sr.	Melbourne, Victoria, Australia	AIS; Indiana
23	Trey Anderson	6'4"	175	G	Fr.	Carrollton, TX, U.S.	Hebron HS
24	Wayne Hunter	6'4"	210	G	Sr.	Sacramento, CA, U.S.	Valley HS
25	Tim Williams	6'9"	235	F	Fr.	Antioch, CA, U.S.	Antioch HS
30	Kenton Walker II	6'9"	235	F	Jr.	San Diego, CA, U.S.	Scripps Ranch HS; Creighton
32	Mickey McConnell	6'0"	175	G	Jr.	Mesa, AZ, U.S.	Dobson HS
40	Phil Benson	6'8"	230	F	Jr.	Scottsdale, AZ, U.S.	Horizon HS; Canisius
50	Omar Samhan	6'11"	265	C	Sr.	San Ramon, CA, U.S.	San Ramon HS

== Schedule and results ==
- All times are Pacific

Date time, TV	Rank^{#}	Opponent^{#}	Result	Record	Site (attendance) city, state
Regular season
11/13/2009*; 8:30pm		New Mexico State	W 100–68	1–0	McKeon Pavilion (3,500); Moraga, CA
11/16/2009*; 11:00pm, ESPN		San Diego State; ESPN College Hoops Tip-Off Marathon	W 80–58	2–0	McKeon Pavilion (2,774); Moraga, CA
11/20/2009*; 8:30pm		Vanderbilt	L 70–72	2–1	McKeon Pavilion (3,500); Moraga, CA
11/23/2009*; 7:05pm		Cal Poly	W 92–67	3–1	McKeon Pavilion (2,673); Moraga, CA
11/25/2009*; 7:05pm		Cal–Maritime	W 100–59	4–1	McKeon Pavilion (2,524); Moraga, CA
11/30/2009*; 7:00pm		at San Jose State	W 78–71	5–1	The Event Center (2,166); San Jose, CA
12/5/2009*; 6:00pm		at Utah State	W 68–63	6–1	Smith Spectrum (10,270); Logan, UT
12/12/2009*; 7:30pm		at Oregon	W 81–76	7–1	McArthur Court (6,487); Eugene, OR
12/15/2009*; 7:05pm		Portland State	W 101–80	8–1	McKeon Pavilion (2,600); Moraga, CA
12/18/2009*; 7:05pm		Pacific	W 80–65	9–1	McKeon Pavilion (3,500); Moraga, CA
12/22/2009*; 12:00pm, ESPNU		vs. Northeastern; Diamond Head Classic	W 78–67	10–1	Stan Sheriff Center (NA); Honolulu, HI
12/23/2009*; 12:00pm, ESPNU		vs. Southern California; Diamond Head Classic	L 49–60	10–2	Stan Sheriff Center (6,666); Honolulu, HI
12/25/2009*; 4:30pm, ESPN2		at Hawai'i; Diamond Head Classic	W 84–75	11–2	Stan Sheriff Center (NA); Honolulu, HI
12/29/2009*; 7:35pm, ESPNU		Binghamton; Shamrock Office Solutions Classic	W 85–57	12–2	McKeon Pavilion (3,072); Moraga, CA
12/30/2009*; 7:35pm		Howard; Shamrock Office Solutions Classic	W 94–46	13–2	McKeon Pavilion (2,965); Moraga, CA
1/8/2010; 6:30pm, CSNCA		at San Francisco	W 83–62	14–2 (1–0)	War Memorial Gymnasium (3,126); San Francisco, CA
1/10/2010; 7:00pm, CSNCA		at Santa Clara	W 80–72	15–2 (2–0)	Leavey Center (2,527); Santa Clara, CA
1/14/2010; 8:00pm, ESPN2		No. 17 Gonzaga	L 82–89	15–3 (2–1)	McKeon Pavilion (3,500); Moraga, CA
1/16/2010; 7:00pm, CSNCA		Portland	W 77–72	16–3 (3–1)	McKeon Pavilion (3,500); Moraga, CA
1/21/2010; 8:00pm, ESPNU		San Diego	W 71–56	17–3 (4–1)	McKeon Pavilion (3,126); Moraga, CA
1/28/2010; 7:00pm		at Pepperdine	W 88–71	18–3 (5–1)	Firestone Fieldhouse (967); Malibu, CA
1/30/2010; 7:00pm, FSN; CSNBA		at Loyola Marymount	W 85–67	19–3 (6–1)	Gersten Pavilion (3,966); Los Angeles, CA
2/4/2010; 8:30pm, CSNCA		Santa Clara	W 74–62	20–3 (7–1)	McKeon Pavilion (3,500); Moraga, CA
2/6/2010; 8:00pm, CSNCA		San Francisco	W 73–57	21–3 (8–1)	McKeon Pavilion (3,500); Moraga, CA
2/11/2010; 8:00pm, ESPN2		at No. 16 Gonzaga	L 61–80	21–4 (8–2)	McCarthey Athletic Center (6,000); Spokane, WA
2/13/2010; 6:00pm, ESPN2		at Portland	L 75–80	21–5 (8–3)	Chiles Center (2,774); Portland, OR
2/18/2010; 6:00pm, ESPN2		at San Diego	W 61–49	22–5 (9–3)	Jenny Craig Pavilion (3,371); San Diego, CA
2/25/2010; 7:05pm		Pepperdine	W 76–49	23–5 (10–3)	McKeon Pavilion (2,718); Moraga, CA
2/27/2010; 6:00pm, CSNCA		Loyola Marymount	W 88–80	24–5 (11–3)	McKeon Pavilion (3,500); Moraga, CA
West Coast Conference tournament
3/7/2010; 7:30pm	(2)	vs. (3) Portland; Semifinals	W 69–55	25–5	Orleans Arena (7,941); Paradise, Nevada
3/8/2010; 7:30pm, ESPN	(2)	vs. (1) No. 18 Gonzaga; Championship	W 81–62	26–5	Orleans Arena (7,726); Paradise, Nevada
2010 NCAA Division I men's basketball tournament
3/18/2010*; 11:50am, CBS	(10 S)	vs. (7 S) No. 24 Richmond; First Round	W 80–71	27–5	Dunkin' Donuts Center (11,106); Providence, RI
3/20/2010*; 10:05am, CBS	(10 S)	vs. (2 S) No. 9 Villanova; Second Round	W 75–68	28–5	Dunkin' Donuts Center (11,271); Providence, RI
3/26/2010*; 4:27pm, CBS	(10 S)	vs. (3 S) No. 19 Baylor; Sweet Sixteen	L 49–72	28–6	Reliant Stadium (45,505); Houston, TX
*Non-conference game. ^{#}Rankings from AP Poll. (#) Tournament seedings in parentheses.
