= Matthew Dellavedova =

Australian basketball player (born 1990)

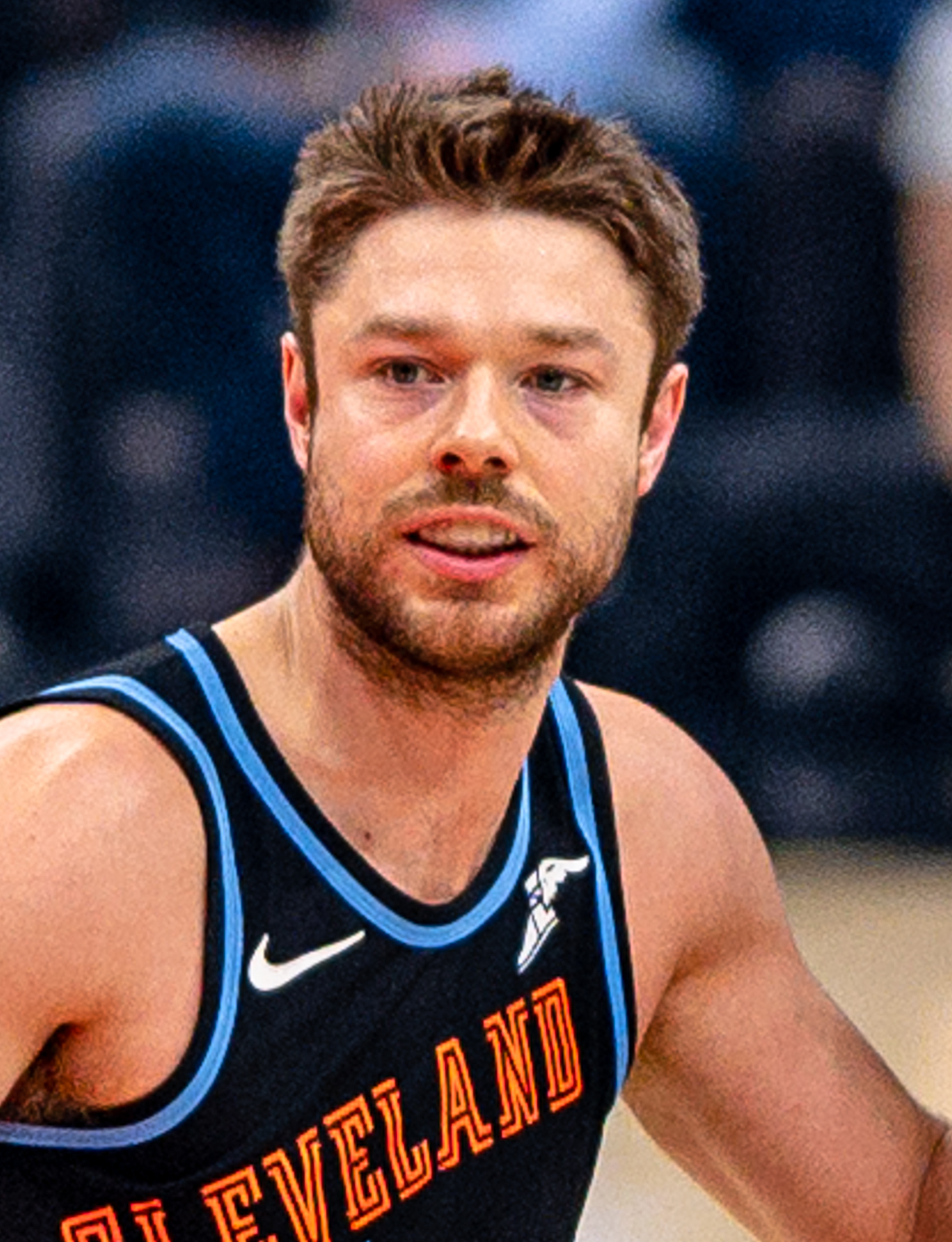
- Dellavedova with the Cleveland Cavaliers in 2019

No. 8 – Sydney Kings
- Position: Point guard / shooting guard
- League: NBL

Personal information
- Born: 8 September 1990 (age 36) Maryborough, Victoria, Australia
- Listed height: 191 cm (6 ft 3 in)
- Listed weight: 91 kg (201 lb)

Career information
- High school: Maryborough Regional College (Maryborough, Victoria); Lake Ginninderra (Canberra, ACT)
- College: Saint Mary's (2009–2013)
- NBA draft: 2013: undrafted
- Playing career: 2007–present

Career history
- 2007–2009: Australian Institute of Sport
- 2013–2016: Cleveland Cavaliers
- 2016–2018: Milwaukee Bucks
- 2018–2021: Cleveland Cavaliers
- 2021–2022: Melbourne United
- 2022–2023: Sacramento Kings
- 2023–2025: Melbourne United
- 2025–present: Sydney Kings

Career highlights
- NBA champion (2016); NBL champion (2026); NBL Championship Series MVP (2025); All-NBL Second Team (2022); 2× AP honorable mention All-American (2012, 2013); WCC Player of the Year (2012); 3× First-team All-WCC (2011–2013); No. 4 retired by Saint Mary's Gaels; Gaze Medal (2014)
- Stats at NBA.com
- Stats at Basketball Reference
Medals
Men's basketball
Representing Australia
Olympic Games
Bronze medal – third place	2020 Tokyo	Team
FIBA Oceania Championship
Gold medal – first place	2011 Australia
Gold medal – first place	2013 Australia/New Zealand
Gold medal – first place	2015 Australia/New Zealand
Silver medal – second place	2009 Australia/New Zealand

Matthew William "Delly" Dellavedova (born 8 September 1990) is an Australian professional basketball player for the Sydney Kings of the National Basketball League (NBL). He played college basketball for Saint Mary's College. In 2016, he won the NBA championship as a member of the Cleveland Cavaliers. As a member of the Australian national team, he won bronze at the Tokyo 2020 Olympics.

== Early life ==
Dellavedova was born and raised in Maryborough, Victoria, as a sixth-generation Italian Australian. As a junior, he played basketball, tennis, soccer, and Australian rules football. On the football field, Dellavedova played the position of wing and kicked a total of 32 goals in 26 games between 1999 and 2001, but gave the game away to focus solely on basketball.

Dellavedova played junior basketball for the Maryborough Blazers and Bendigo Braves, and attended Maryborough Regional College.

Between 2007 and 2009, Dellavedova attended the Australian Institute of Sport (AIS) in Canberra. There, he played for the AIS men's team in the South East Australian Basketball League (SEABL). He averaged 15.2 points, 4.8 rebounds, and 3.5 assists in 18 games in 2008 and 10.9 points, 5.0 rebounds, and 3.0 assists in nine games in 2009.

While in Canberra, Dellavedova attended Lake Ginninderra Secondary College. In 2017, he was inducted into the Lake Ginninderra Hall of Fame.

College recruiting
Name	Hometown	School	Height	Weight	Commit date
Matthew Dellavedova; SG	Maryborough, Victoria	Australian Institute of Sport	6 ft 3 in (1.91 m)	190 lb (86 kg)	Nov 12, 2008
Matthew Dellavedova; SG	Recruit ratings: 247Sports: (86)				
Overall recruit ranking: ESPN: 72 (SG)
Note: In many cases, Scout, Rivals, 247Sports, On3, and ESPN may conflict in their listings of height and weight.; In these cases, the average was taken. ESPN grades are on a 100-point scale.; Sources: "Saint Mary's Gaels 2009 Player Commits". ESPN.; "2009 Team Ranking". Rivals.

== College career ==
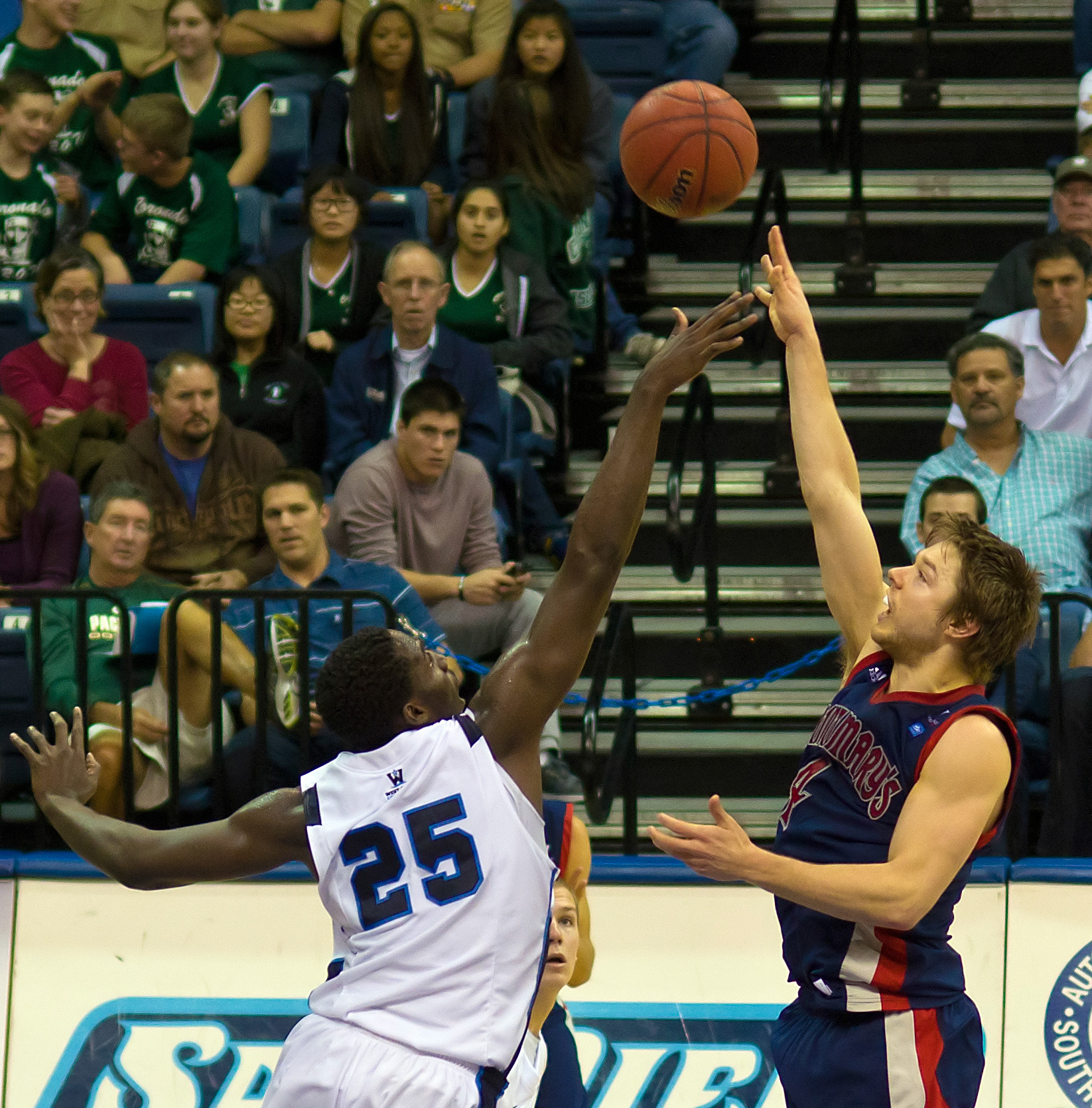
Dellavedova in January 2012, shooting against San Diego

Dellavedova was recruited by Randy Bennett and the Saint Mary's College of California in 2009 and signed with the Gaels before the 2009–10 season. He was ranked by ESPN as one of the top junior players in Australia. Dellavedova immediately contributed for the Gaels and started all 34 games as a freshman. In 2009–10, he averaged 12.1 points, 3.5 rebounds, and 4.5 assists per game. That season, the Gaels won 28 games and reached the Sweet Sixteen of the 2010 NCAA men's basketball tournament. The Gaels reached the Sweet Sixteen by upsetting Villanova, 75–68. Dellavedova's crucial late free throws iced the game against the Wildcats.

On 16 January 2013, Dellavedova scored 18 points, including a game-winning three-point buzzer-beater, in a 70–69 victory over the BYU Cougars. The forty-foot shot soon became known as the "Dellavedagger." In 2012–13, Dellavedova was an Academic All-America selection and a Senior CLASS Award finalist.

Dellavedova graduated from Saint Mary's in 2013 with a degree in psychology. He finished his college career as Saint Mary's all-time leader in scoring, assists, games played, free throw percentage, and three-point shots.

St. Mary's retired his jersey on 15 February 2014. Dellavedova's #4 was the second retired by the school's men's basketball program, joining Tom Meschery in the rafters of McKeon Pavilion.

== Professional career ==
=== Cleveland Cavaliers (2013–2016) ===
==== 2013–14 season ====
After going undrafted in the 2013 NBA draft, Dellavedova joined the Cleveland Cavaliers for the 2013 NBA Summer League. On 12 September 2013, he signed a two-year, $1.3 million contract with the Cavaliers, with $100,000 guaranteed. On 26 March 2014, he scored a career-high 21 points in a 97–96 win over the Detroit Pistons.

==== 2014–15 season ====
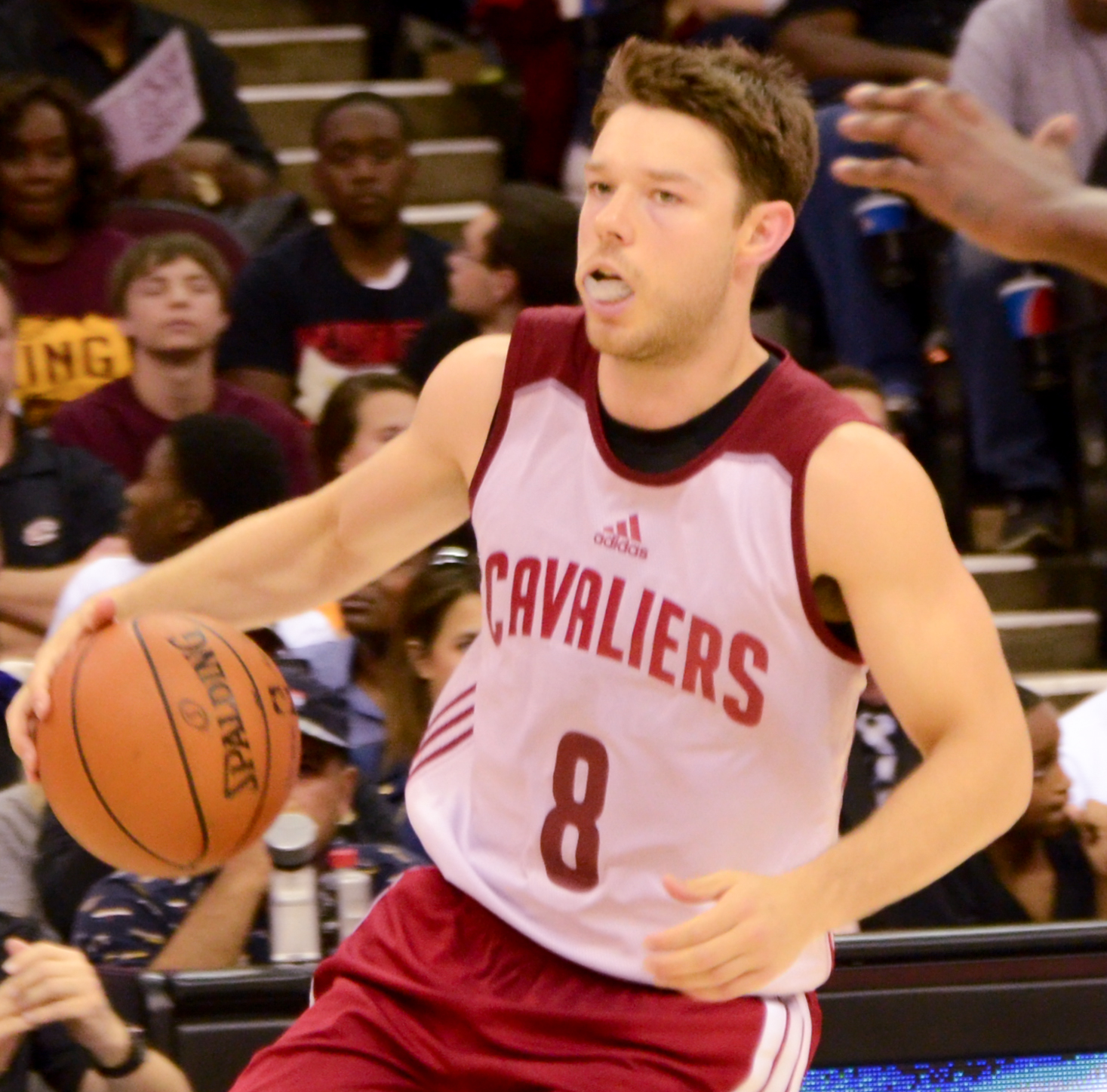
Dellavedova with the Cleveland Cavaliers in 2014

In July 2014, Dellavedova re-joined the Cavaliers for the 2014 NBA Summer League. Between 5 November and 5 December, Dellavedova was sidelined with a sprained medial collateral ligament (MCL). In February 2015, he participated in the Rising Stars Challenge as part of the NBA All-Star weekend. In the regular-season finale on 15 April, he recorded 18 points and 12 assists in a 113–108 overtime win over the Washington Wizards.

In Game 6 of the Eastern Conference semifinals, Dellavedova scored a team-high 19 points to help the Cavaliers defeat the Chicago Bulls and advance to the Conference Finals. Following the Cavaliers' Game 3 win over the Atlanta Hawks in Eastern Conference Finals, Dellavedova's aggressive play became a major talking point with some describing him as a "dirty" player. Despite this criticism, teammate LeBron James and NBA great Charles Barkley both defended Dellavedova's style of play. The Cavaliers defeated the Hawks 4–0 to advance to the 2015 NBA Finals.

In Game 2 of the NBA Finals against the Golden State Warriors, in the absence of the injured Kyrie Irving, Dellavedova held Stephen Curry to 0-of-8 shooting and four turnovers while guarding him. The Cavaliers won Game 2 in overtime, 95–93, for their first victory of an NBA Finals game in franchise history. In Game 3, Dellavedova scored a playoff career-high 20 points as the Cavaliers defeated the Warriors to take a 2–1 series lead. After the game, Dellavedova was so dehydrated that he needed an IV, and he was quickly taken to the Cleveland Clinic for medical attention. The day after the game, his jersey sales were more than the entire season. The Cavaliers went on to lose the last three games of the series, and Dellavedova shot just 19% from the field in those three games.

==== 2015–16 season ====
On 27 July 2015, Dellavedova re-signed with the Cavaliers. On 19 November 2015, he recorded a then career-high 13 assists in a 115–100 win over the Milwaukee Bucks. On 20 December, he scored a season-high 20 points on 7-of-10 shooting in a 108–86 win over the Philadelphia 76ers. He missed five straight games in February 2016 with a strained hamstring. The Cavaliers returned to the NBA Finals in 2016 with a 4–2 series win over the Toronto Raptors in the Eastern Conference Finals. In a Finals rematch with the Golden State Warriors, the Cavaliers became the first team in NBA history to win the championship after being down 3–1 in the series.

=== Milwaukee Bucks (2016–2018) ===
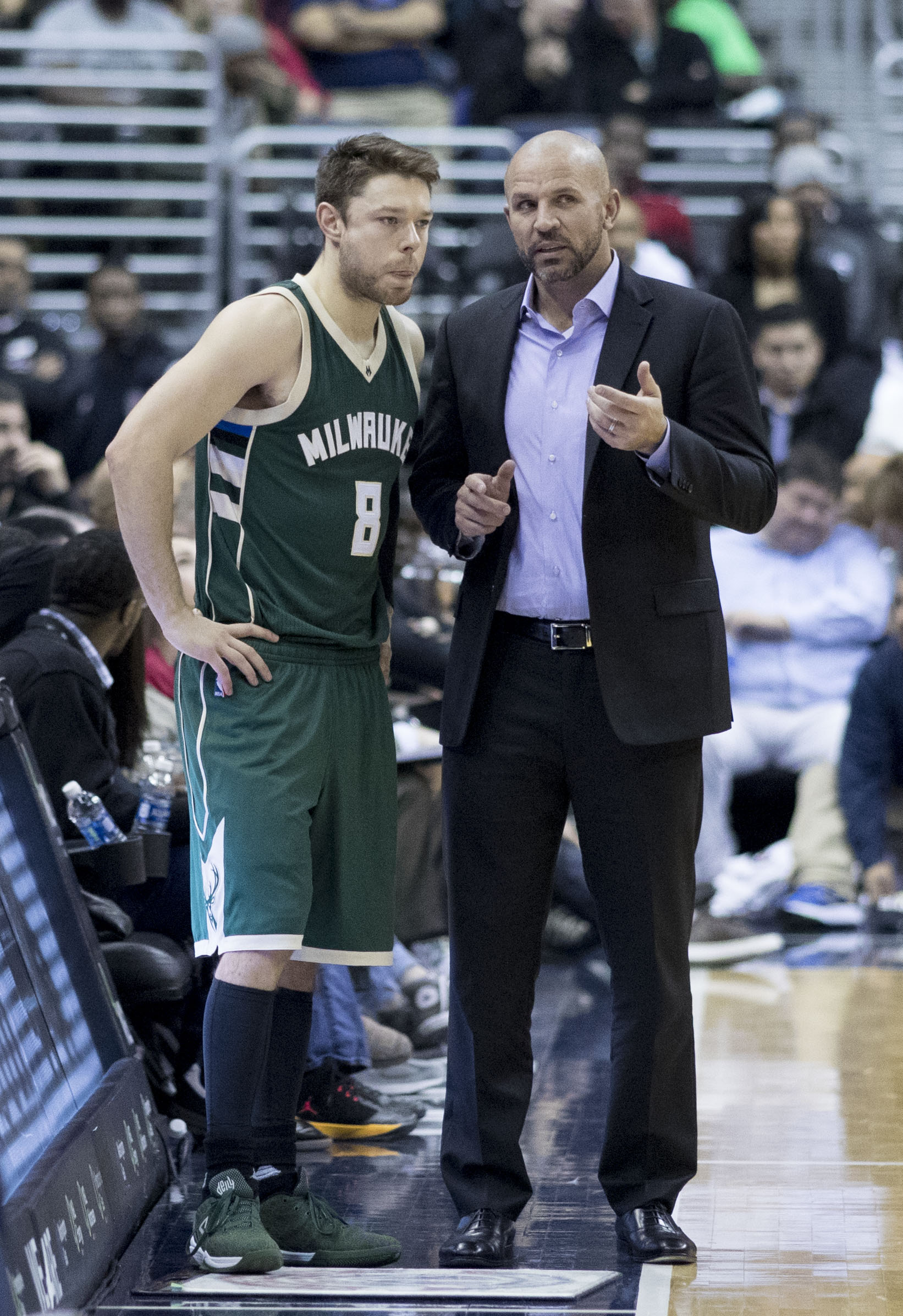
Dellavedova with Bucks head coach Jason Kidd in 2016

On 7 July 2016, Dellavedova was acquired by the Milwaukee Bucks in a sign-and-trade deal with the Cavaliers, in which Cleveland received a $4.8 million trade exception and the rights to Albert Miralles, while Milwaukee also received cash considerations. Dellavedova's contract gave him $38 million over four years.

Dellavedova made his debut for the Bucks in their season opener on 26 October 2016, scoring 11 points in 29 minutes as a starter in a 107–96 loss to the Charlotte Hornets. On 3 December 2016, he scored 12 of his season-high 18 points in the fourth quarter of the Bucks' 112–103 win over the Brooklyn Nets. After starting all 30 games to begin the season, he missed five straight games in late December and early January with a strained right hamstring. In 2016–17, he averaged career highs in points (7.6) and assists (4.7) in a career-high 26.1 minutes per game over 76 contests with a career-high 54 starts.

Dellavedova missed 15 consecutive games with left knee tendinitis during November and December of the 2017–18 season. On 1 January 2018, Dellavedova had a season-high 10 assists in a 131–127 overtime loss to the Toronto Raptors. A right ankle sprain suffered on 4 February against the Nets saw Dellavedova miss 29 straight games, returning to action in the Bucks' regular-season finale against the Philadelphia 76ers on 11 April. He went on to play in six of the Bucks' seven playoff games.

=== Return to Cleveland (2018–2021) ===
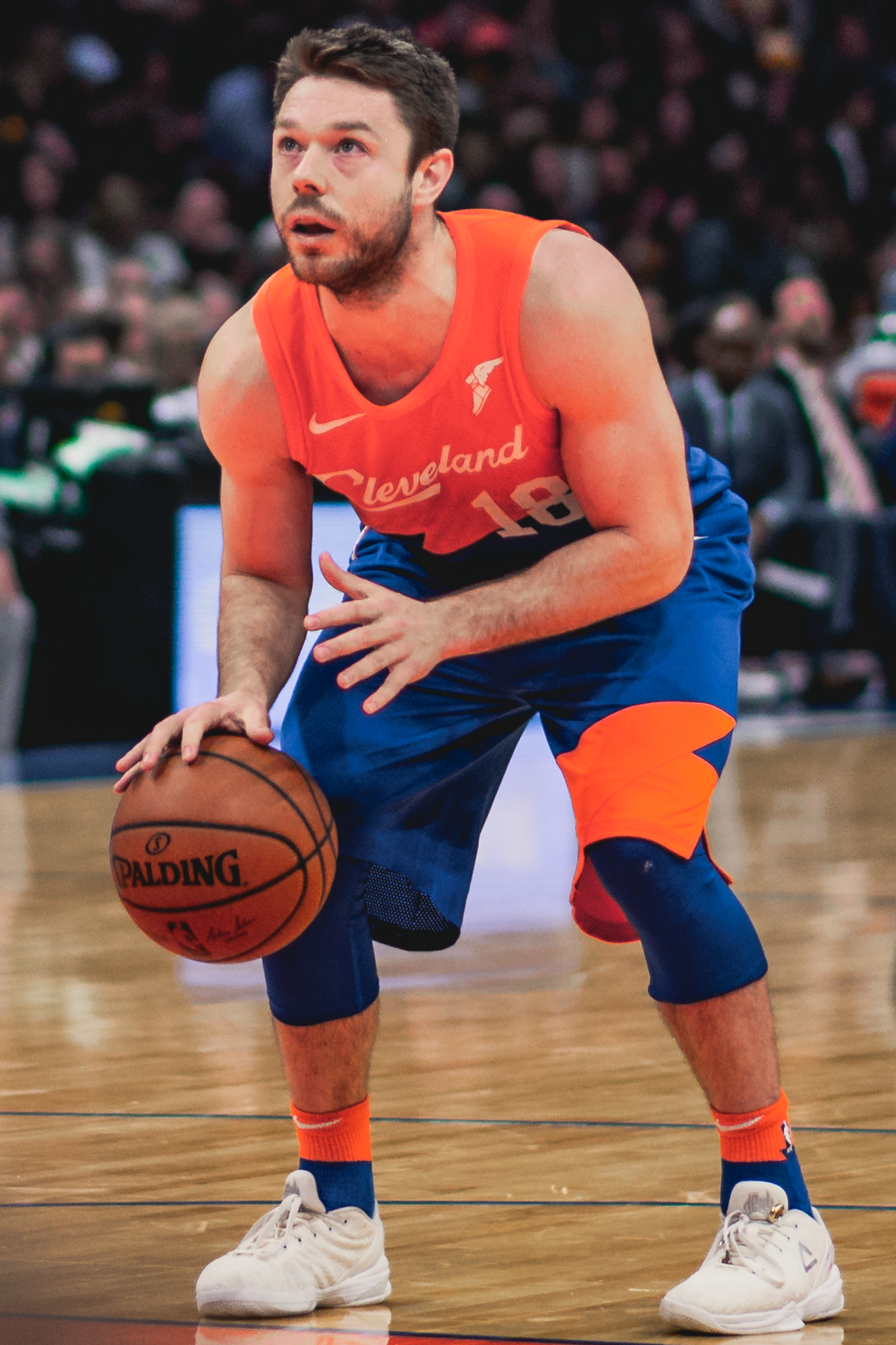
Dellavedova prepares to shoot a free throw in 2019

On 7 December 2018, Dellavedova was acquired by the Cleveland Cavaliers in a three-team trade that also involved the Bucks and the Washington Wizards. In his return game for the Cavaliers in Milwaukee three days later, Dellavedova received an ovation when he entered the game and finished with 11 points in 16 minutes in a 108–92 loss to the Bucks.

On 7 March 2020, Dellavedova recorded a career-high 14 assists in a 104–102 win over the Denver Nuggets.

On 25 November 2020, Dellavedova re-signed with the Cavaliers. He appeared in just 13 games with the Cavaliers during the 2020–21 season as he suffered a variety of ailments, including a concussion, whiplash, an emergency appendectomy, and a neck strain.

=== Melbourne United (2021–2022) ===
On 9 July 2021, Dellavedova signed a three-year deal with Melbourne United of the Australian NBL. On 16 January 2022, he scored a career-high 33 points with seven 3-pointers and nine assists in an 88–84 win over the Illawarra Hawks. He averaged 10.3 points and 4.3 assists per game during the 2021–22 NBL season. He parted ways with United in July 2022 to return to the NBA.

=== Sacramento Kings (2022–2023) ===
On 29 July 2022, Dellavedova signed with the Sacramento Kings. On 29 March 2023, he sustained a right index finger fracture in a game against the Portland Trail Blazers.

=== Return to Melbourne (2023–2025) ===
On 17 May 2023, Dellavedova signed a two-year deal with Melbourne United, returning to the team for a second stint.

In the 2023–24 NBL season, United finished as minor premiers and reached the NBL Championship Series, where they lost 3–2 to the Tasmania JackJumpers.

In the 2024–25 NBL season, Dellavedova helped United return to the NBL Championship Series, where they lost 3–2 to the Illawarra Hawks. He had a standout series but struggled in Game 5 with five points and seven assists on 2-of-6 shooting. Despite United losing the series, Dellavedova was awarded the Larry Sengstock Medal as the NBL Championship Series MVP, something that had not happened since 1993.

=== Sydney Kings (2025–present) ===
On 10 April 2025, Dellavedova signed a three-year deal with the Sydney Kings. He was sidelined for three weeks during January 2026 due to a concussion.

== Career statistics ==
Legend
GP	Games played	GS	Games started	MPG	Minutes per game
FG%	Field goal percentage	3P%	3-point field goal percentage	FT%	Free throw percentage
RPG	Rebounds per game	APG	Assists per game	SPG	Steals per game
BPG	Blocks per game	PPG	Points per game	**Bold**	Career high
†	Won an NBA championship

=== NBA ===
==== Regular season ====
Year	Team	GP	GS	MPG	FG%	3P%	FT%	RPG	APG	SPG	BPG	PPG
2013–14	Cleveland	72	4	17.7	.412	.368	.792	1.7	2.6	.5	**.1**	4.7
2014–15	Cleveland	67	13	20.6	.362	.407	.763	1.9	3.0	.4	.0	4.8
2015–16†	Cleveland	**76**	14	24.6	.405	**.410**	.864	**2.1**	4.4	.6	**.1**	7.5
2016–17	Milwaukee	**76**	**54**	**26.1**	.390	.367	.854	1.9	**4.7**	**.7**	.0	**7.6**
2017–18	Milwaukee	38	3	18.7	.362	.372	.926	1.7	3.8	.4	.0	4.3
2018–19	Milwaukee	12	0	8.1	.316	.364	**1.000**	.8	2.4	.2	.0	1.7
2018–19	Cleveland	36	0	19.9	**.413**	.336	.792	1.9	4.2	.3	**.1**	7.3
2019–20	Cleveland	57	4	14.4	.354	.231	.865	1.3	3.2	.4	.0	3.1
2020–21	Cleveland	13	1	17.2	.250	.160	**1.000**	1.8	4.5	.3	**.1**	2.8
2022–23	Sacramento	32	0	6.7	.340	.333	.571	.4	1.3	.2	.0	1.5
Career		479	93	19.4	.385	.363	.835	1.7	3.5	.4	.0	5.2

==== Playoffs ====
Year	Team	GP	GS	MPG	FG%	3P%	FT%	RPG	APG	SPG	BPG	PPG
2015	Cleveland	**20**	**7**	24.9	.346	.316	.781	**2.1**	2.7	**.5**	.0	7.2
2016†	Cleveland	**20**	0	12.1	.351	.258	.750	.8	**2.8**	.1	**.1**	3.9
2017	Milwaukee	6	0	**26.5**	**.390**	**.375**	.800	2.0	2.0	.2	.0	**7.7**
2018	Milwaukee	6	0	13.0	.333	.222	**1.000**	.8	2.7	.3	.0	2.0
Career		52	7	18.8	.354	.303	.779	1.4	2.6	.3	.0	5.4

=== College ===
Year	Team	GP	GS	MPG	FG%	3P%	FT%	RPG	APG	SPG	BPG	PPG
2009–10	Saint Mary's	34	34	36.4	.390	**.398**	.850	3.5	4.5	**1.2**	.0	12.1
2010–11	Saint Mary's	34	31	35.3	.418	.376	**.881**	**3.6**	5.3	**1.2**	.0	13.4
2011–12	Saint Mary's	33	33	**37.5**	**.446**	.355	.857	3.3	**6.4**	.8	**.1**	15.5
2012–13	Saint Mary's	**35**	**35**	36.4	.404	.382	.852	3.4	**6.4**	1.1	**.1**	**15.8**
Career		136	133	36.4	.415	.378	.860	3.5	5.7	1.1	.1	14.2

== Player profile ==
Dellavedova is well known for his high levels of effort while playing. Multiple players, coaches, and commentators have praised his toughness and competitiveness, particularly on defense. On account of his aggressiveness, some have cast Dellavedova as reckless or dirty. However, multiple current and former players have spoken in defense of Dellavedova, including LeBron James, Kobe Bryant, Charles Barkley, and Antonio Davis. Dellavedova's offensive strengths includes his three-point shot, his floater, and his passing ability.

== National team career ==
Dellavedova competed for the Australian junior national team at the 2009 FIBA Under-19 World Championship. He was the team's third leading scorer – averaging 10.1 points per game – for the fourth-place Australians. He was named in the Australian senior national team, the Boomers, to compete for the first time at the 2009 FIBA Oceania Championship. At age 19, he was the youngest Australian player at the competition. He went on to compete for the Boomers at the 2012 London Olympics, the 2014 World Cup in Spain, the 2016 Rio Olympics, and the 2019 World Cup in China. At the 2020 Olympics, he helped Australia win bronze.

In July 2024, Dellavedova was named in the Boomers' final squad for the Paris Olympics.

== Personal life ==
Dellavedova's father, Mark, grew up playing Australian rules football and his mother, Leanne, played netball. Both of Dellavedova's sisters, Yana and Ingrid, play basketball as well.

Dellavedova married his long-time girlfriend, Anna Schroeder, on 1 July 2017, after proposing to her on 10 September 2016. Dellavedova met Schroeder at Saint Mary's, where she played volleyball and was an honor roll student. They started dating after his senior year. On 5 July 2019, the couple announced they were expecting their first child, a boy. On 6 November, he announced the birth of his son, Anders Ralph Dellavedova.

He has a second cousin, also named Matthew Dellavedova, who is a tennis player in Australia. Dellavedova is good friends with his former Cavaliers teammate, Joe Harris.

Dellavedova is an avid supporter of the Collingwood Magpies in the Australian Football League.

=== Community involvement ===
On 28 March 2015, Dellavedova escorted Jackie Custer, a 17-year-old cancer patient, to Akron Children's Hospital's "A Prom to Remember" event. Custer was asked to choose a celebrity guest to escort her to the event, and chose Dellavedova. Custer stated, "Going to prom with Delly was a night I'll never forget. It was definitely magical, and he's the sweetest guy I've ever met."
