= 2010 West Coast Conference men's basketball tournament =

2010 West Coast men's basketball tournament
- Tournament Logo
- Classification: Division I
- Season: 2009–10
- Teams: 8
- Site: Orleans Arena; Paradise, Nevada
- Champions: Saint Mary's (2nd title)
- Winning coach: Randy Bennett (1st title)
- Television: ESPN
- West Coast men's basketball tournaments

2009–10 West Coast Conference men's basketball standings
	Conf.				Overall
Team	W		L	PCT	W		L	PCT
No. 22 Gonzaga	12	–	2	.857	27	–	7	.794
Saint Mary's†	11	–	3	.786	28	–	6	.824
Portland	10	–	4	.714	21	–	11	.656
San Francisco	7	–	7	.500	12	–	18	.400
Loyola Marymount	7	–	7	.500	18	–	16	.529
San Diego	3	–	11	.214	11	–	21	.344
Santa Clara	3	–	11	.214	11	–	21	.344
Pepperdine	3	–	11	.214	7	–	24	.226
† Conference tournament winner Rankings from AP poll

The 2010 West Coast Conference men's basketball tournament took place March 5–8, 2010, at Orleans Arena in Paradise, Nevada. The tournament was won by Saint Mary's, who defeated Gonzaga in the championship game.

== Format ==
The teams were seeded based on their record following a 14-game conference season. The winner of the tournament received an automatic bid to the NCAA tournament.

== Bracket ==
First round Friday, March 5
5	Loyola Marymount	87
8	Pepperdine	84
6	San Diego	61
7	Santa Clara	59

Quarter finals Saturday, March 6
4	San Francisco	76
5	Loyola Marymount	84
3	Portland	72
6	San Diego	57

Semi-finals; Sunday, March 7
1	#18 Gonzaga	77
5	Loyola Marymount	62
2	Saint Mary's	69
3	Portland	55

Finals; Monday, March 8
1	#18 Gonzaga	62
2	Saint Mary's	81

Asterisk denotes game ended in overtime.
