= 2009–10 Gonzaga Bulldogs men's basketball team =

American college basketball season

2009–10 Gonzaga Bulldogs men's basketball

WCC regular season champions Maui Invitational champions

NCAA tournament, Round of 32
- Conference: West Coast Conference

Ranking
- Coaches: No. 23
- AP: No. 22
- Record: 27–7 (12–2 WCC)
- Head coach: Mark Few (11th season)
- Assistant coaches: Leon Rice (11th season); Tommy Lloyd (9th season); Ray Giacoletti (3rd season)
- Home arena: McCarthey Athletic Center

2009–10 West Coast Conference men's basketball standings
	Conf.				Overall
Team	W		L	PCT	W		L	PCT
No. 22 Gonzaga	12	–	2	.857	27	–	7	.794
Saint Mary's†	11	–	3	.786	28	–	6	.824
Portland	10	–	4	.714	21	–	11	.656
San Francisco	7	–	7	.500	12	–	18	.400
Loyola Marymount	7	–	7	.500	18	–	16	.529
San Diego	3	–	11	.214	11	–	21	.344
Santa Clara	3	–	11	.214	11	–	21	.344
Pepperdine	3	–	11	.214	7	–	24	.226
† Conference tournament winner Rankings from AP poll

The 2009–10 Gonzaga Bulldogs men's basketball team represented Gonzaga University in the 2009–10 NCAA Division I men's basketball season. The Bulldogs are members of the West Coast Conference, were led by head coach Mark Few, and played they home games at the McCarthey Athletic Center on the Gonzaga campus in Spokane, Washington. The Zags finished the season 27–7, 12–2 in WCC play to claim the regular season championship. They advanced to the championship game of the 2010 West Coast Conference men's basketball tournament before falling to Saint Mary's.

They received an at–large bid to the 2010 NCAA Division I men's basketball tournament, earning an 8 seed in the West Region. They defeated 9 seed Florida State in the first round before losing to 1 seed and AP #4 Syracuse in the second round.

== Preseason ==
=== Departures ===
Name	Number	Pos.	Height	Weight	Year	Hometown	Reason for departure
Josh Heytvelt	42	F	6'11"	260	Senior (Redshirt)	Clarkston, WA	Graduated
Andrew Sorenson	11	G	6'2"	172	Senior (Redshirt)	Olympia, WA	Graduated
Micah Downs	22	G	6'8"	194	Senior	Kirkland, WA	Graduated
Jeremy Pargo	2	G	6'2"	220	Senior	Chicago, IL	Graduated
Ira Brown	50	F	6'4"	235	Senior	Conroe, TX	Graduated
Austin Daye	5	F	6'11"	200	Sophomore	Irvine, CA	Entered the 2009 NBA draft

=== Incoming transfers ===
Name	Pos.	Height	Weight	Year	Hometown	Previous School	Years Remaining	Date Eligible
Bol Kong	G	6'6"	220	Sophomore (redshirt)	Vancouver, BC	Douglas College	3	Oct. 1, 2009

=== 2009 recruiting class ===
College recruiting information
Name	Hometown	School	Height	Weight	Commit date
Mangisto Arop; SF	Edmonton, AB	St. Mary (ON)	6 ft 5 in (1.96 m)	208 lb (94 kg)	May 7, 2008
Mangisto Arop; SF	Recruit ratings: Scout: Rivals: (88)				
Sam Dower; C	Brooklyn Park, MN	Osseo	6 ft 9 in (2.06 m)	228 lb (103 kg)	Sep 6, 2008
Sam Dower; C	Recruit ratings: Scout: Rivals: (89)				
Elias Harris; PF	Speyer, Germany	Friedrich-Magnus-Schwerd-Gymnasium; BIS Speyer	6 ft 8 in (2.03 m)	215 lb (98 kg)	Dec 16, 2008
Elias Harris; PF	Recruit ratings: Scout: Rivals: (NR)				
Kelly Olynyk; PF	Kamloops, BC	South Kamloops	6 ft 11 in (2.11 m)	215 lb (98 kg)	Jan 26, 2009
Kelly Olynyk; PF	Recruit ratings: Scout: Rivals: (90)				
G. J. Vilarino; PG	McKinney, TX	McKinney	6 ft 0 in (1.83 m)	177 lb (80 kg)	Apr 27, 2009
G. J. Vilarino; PG	Recruit ratings: Scout: Rivals: (88)				
David Stockton; PG	Spokane, WA	Gonzaga Prep	5 ft 10 in (1.78 m)	150 lb (68 kg)	
David Stockton; PG	Recruit ratings: Scout: Rivals: (NR)				
Overall recruit ranking: Scout: NR Rivals: NR 247Sports: NR ESPN: NR
Note: In many cases, Scout, Rivals, 247Sports, On3, and ESPN may conflict in their listings of height and weight.; In these cases, the average was taken. ESPN grades are on a 100-point scale.; Sources: "2009 Gonzaga Rivals Commits". Rivals.; "2009 Gonzaga Scout Commits". Scout.; "2009 Gonzaga ESPN Commits". ESPN.; "Scout.com Team Recruiting Rankings". Scout.; "2009 Team Ranking". Rivals.; "2009–10 Gonzaga Bulldogs men's basketball team". 247Sports.

== Roster ==
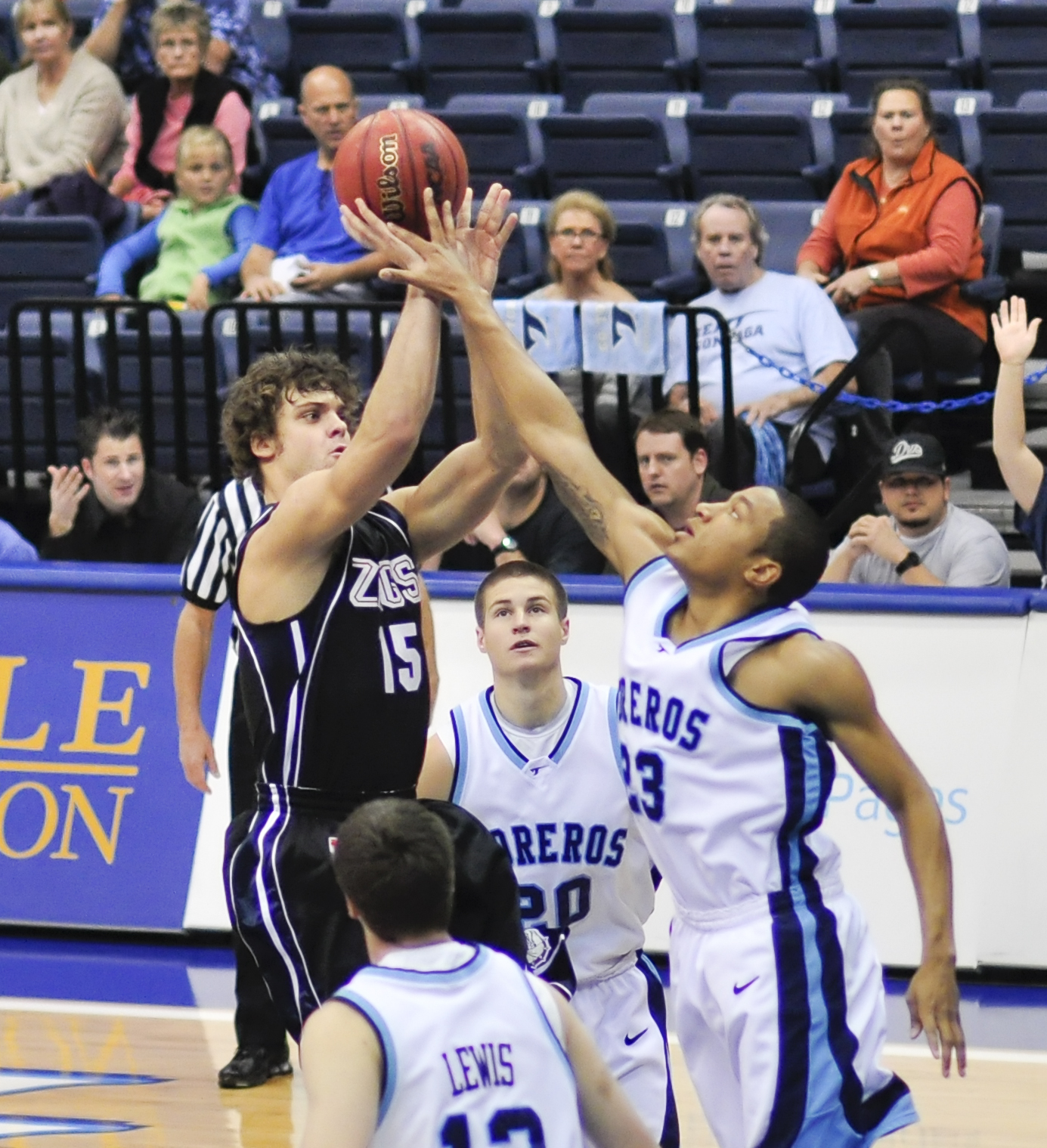
Matt Bouldin

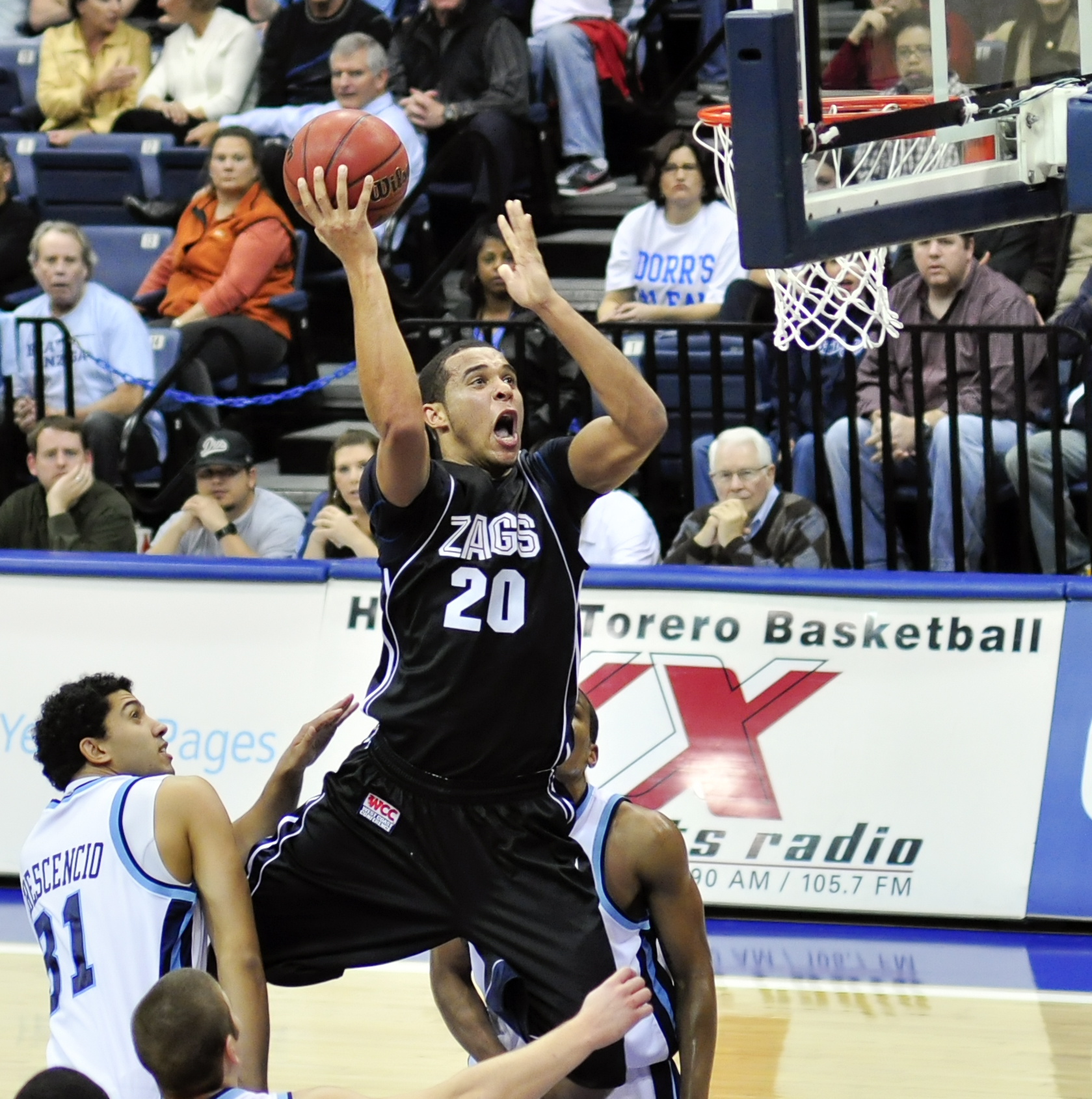
Elias Harris

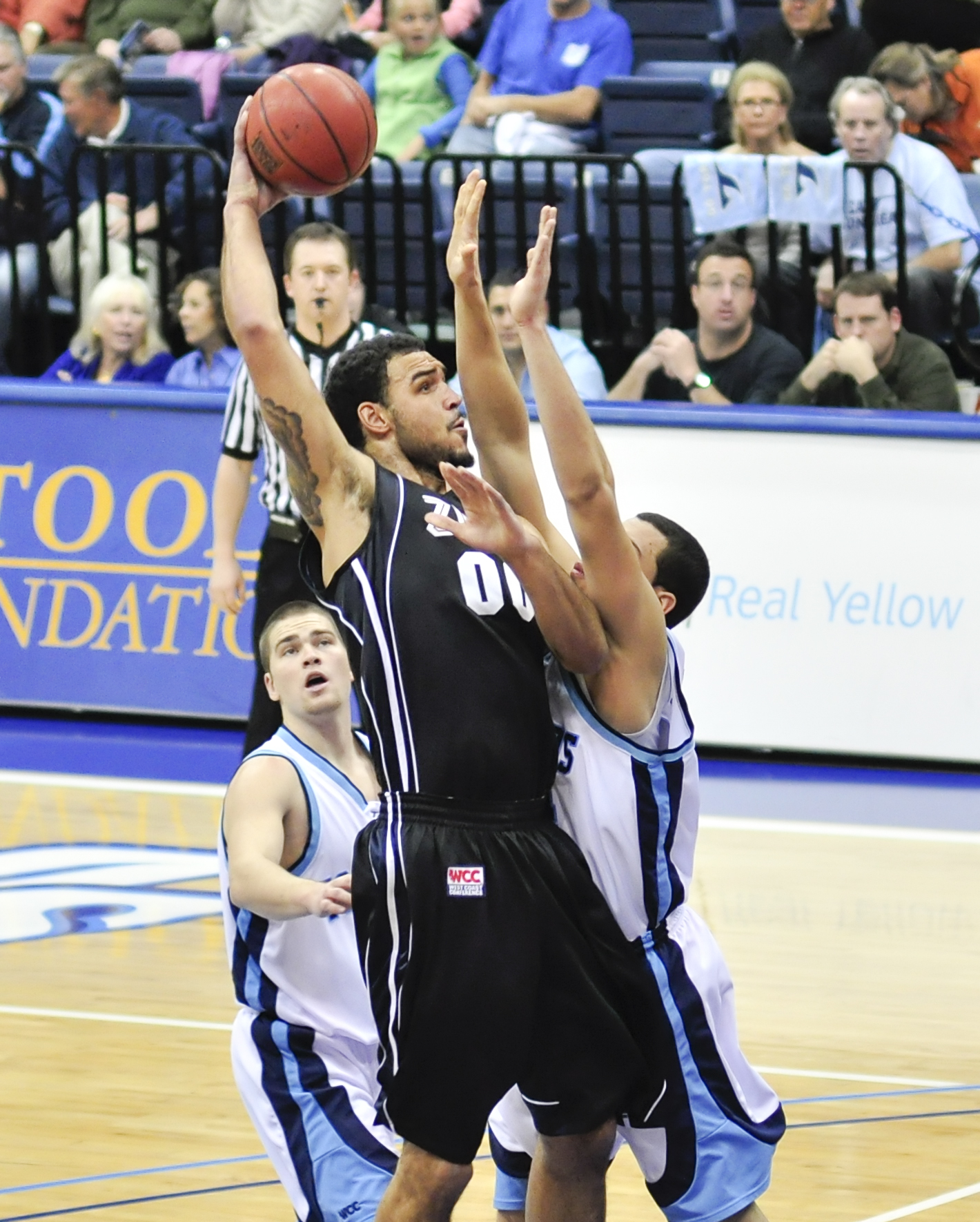
Robert Sacre

2009–10 Gonzaga Bulldogs men's basketball team
Players
Coaches

Pos.	#	Name	Height	Weight	Year	Previous school	Hometown
C	45	Will Foster	7 ft 5 in (2.26 m)	273 lb (124 kg)	Sr	White River	Bonney Lake, WA
G	15	Matt Bouldin	6 ft 5 in (1.96 m)	224 lb (102 kg)	Sr	ThunderRidge	Highlands Ranch, CO
G	4	Chris Pontarolo-Magg (W)	5 ft 11 in (1.8 m)	175 lb (79 kg)	Sr	Quincy	Quincy, WA
G	32	Steven Gray	6 ft 5 in (1.96 m)	208 lb (94 kg)	Jr	Bainbridge	Bainbridge Island, WA
G	34	Bol Kong	6 ft 6 in (1.98 m)	220 lb (100 kg)	RS So	St. George's; Douglas College	Vancouver, BC
C	00	Robert Sacre	7 ft 0 in (2.13 m)	247 lb (112 kg)	RS So	Handsworth	North Vancouver, BC
G	3	Demetri Goodson	5 ft 11 in (1.8 m)	164 lb (74 kg)	So	Klein Collins	Spring, TX
F	14	Andy Poling	6 ft 11 in (2.11 m)	232 lb (105 kg)	RS Fr	Westview	Portland, OR
G	10	Grant Gibbs	6 ft 4 in (1.93 m)	204 lb (93 kg)	RS Fr	Linn-Mar	Marion, IA
G	30	Michael Hart (W)	6 ft 5 in (1.96 m)	201 lb (91 kg)	RS Fr	Jesuit	Portland, OR
F	1	Mangisto Arop	6 ft 5 in (1.96 m)	208 lb (94 kg)	Fr	St. Mary (ON)	Edmonton, AB
F	20	Elias Harris	6 ft 8 in (2.03 m)	215 lb (98 kg)	Fr	Friedrich-Magnus-Schwerd-Gymnasium; BIS Speyer	Speyer, Germany
F	13	Kelly Olynyk	6 ft 11 in (2.11 m)	215 lb (98 kg)	Fr	South Kamloops	Kamloops, BC
G	5	G.J. Vilarino	6 ft 0 in (1.83 m)	177 lb (80 kg)	Fr	McKinney	McKinney, TX
C	35	Sam Dower (redshirt)	6 ft 9 in (2.06 m)	228 lb (103 kg)	Fr	Osseo	Brooklyn Park, MN
G	11	David Stockton (W) (redshirt)	5 ft 10 in (1.78 m)	150 lb (68 kg)	Fr	Gonzaga Prep	Spokane, WA

Head coach

- Mark Few

Assistant coach(es)

- Leon Rice
- Tommy Lloyd
- Ray Giacoletti

Legend

- (C) Team captain
- (S) Suspended
- (I) Ineligible
- (W) Walk-on
- Injured
- Current redshirt

Roster

== Rankings ==
Legend
	Improvement in ranking
	Drop in ranking
	Not ranked previous week
RV	Received votes but were not ranked in Top 25 of poll

Poll	Pre	Wk 2	Wk 3	Wk 4	Wk 5	Wk 6	Wk 7	Wk 8	Wk 9	Wk 10	Wk 11	Wk 12	Wk 13	Wk 14	Wk 15	Wk 16	Wk 17	Wk 18	Wk 19
AP	RV	RV	RV	17	21	15	25	RV	19	17	15	13	17	16	13	18	18	18	22
Coaches	RV	RV	RV	16	22	15т	24	22	18	14	10	8	13	11	9	15	14	14	18

== Season ==
=== Preconference ===
Gonzaga opened the season with a 94–53 exhibition victory over Alberta on November 2. Matt Bouldin led the team with 17 points, followed by Sam Dower with 15 points and Robert Sacre with 11 points. Gonzaga led by as many as 26 points in the second half as they earned a 92–74 victory over Mississippi Valley State on November 14. Four Gonzaga players scored in double-figures, including Bouldin with a game-high 22 points, Elias Harris with 18, Steven Gray with 16, and Sacre with 17. On November 17, they played against Michigan State at the Jack Breslin Student Events Center and finished with a 75–71 loss against the second-ranked Spartans. Sacre managed to match his career-high of 17 points, despite playing only 19 minutes in the game. The Zags returned home and finished with a 90–55 victory over IPFW on November 20. Sacre lead Gonzaga with 15 points, 8 rebounds, and 2 blocks.

During Thanksgiving week, Gonzaga participated in the 2009 Maui Invitational Tournament at the Lahaina Civic Center in Lahaina, Hawaii. On November 23, they defeated Colorado 76–72 during the opening round of the tournament. Steven Gray scored a game-high 27 points to help the Zags overcome a bad first half. In the second round of the tournament on November 24, Gonzaga defeated Wisconsin 74–61. Four Gonzaga players scored in double digits, which helped the Zags maintain a double digit lead for most of the second half. On November 25, Gonzaga beat Cincinnati 61–59 to win the Maui Invitational for the first time in school history. Steven Gray lead the Zags with 13 points, 7 rebounds, and 4 assists.

== Schedule ==
Date time, TV	Rank^{#}	Opponent^{#}	Result	Record	Site (attendance) city, state
Exhibition Event
11/02/2009*; 6:00 pm, KHQ-TV		Alberta	W 94–53		McCarthey Athletic Center (6,000); Spokane, WA
Regular Season
11/14/2009*; 5:00 pm, KHQ-TV/FSN		Mississippi Valley State	W 92–74	1–0	McCarthey Athletic Center (6,000); Spokane, WA
11/17/2009*; 5:00 pm, ESPN		at No. 2 Michigan State	L 75–71	1–1	Breslin Center (14,759); East Lansing, MI
11/20/2009*; 6:00 pm, KHQ-TV/FSN		IPFW	W 90–55	2–1	McCarthey Athletic Center (6,000); Spokane, WA
2009 EA Sports Maui Invitational
11/23/2009*; 12:00 pm, ESPN		vs. Colorado; EA Sports Maui Invitation First Round	W 76–72	3–1	Lahaina Civic Center (2,400); Lahaina, Hawaii
11/24/2009*; 7:30 pm, ESPN/ESPN2		vs. Wisconsin; EA Sports Maui Invitation Semi-Final	W 74–61	4–1	Lahaina Civic Center (2,400); Lahaina, Hawaii
11/25/2009*; 8:00 pm, ESPN		vs. Cincinnati; EA Sports Maui Invitation Final	W 61–59 ^{OT}	5–1	Lahaina Civic Center (2,400); Lahaina, Hawaii
12/02/2009*; 6:00 pm, KHQ-TV/FSN	No. 17	Washington State	W 74–69	6–1	McCarthey Athletic Center (6,000); Spokane, Washington
12/05/2009*; 2:00 pm, ESPN2	No. 17	Wake Forest	L 77–75	6–2	McCarthey Athletic Center (6,000); Spokane, Washington
12/09/2009*; 6:00 pm, KHQ-TV/FSN	No. 21	Augustana College	W 79–40	7–2	McCarthey Athletic Center (6,000); Spokane, Washington
Battle In Seattle
12/12/2009*; 1:00 pm, KHQ-TV	No. 21	vs. Davidson; Battle in Seattle	W 103–91	8–2	KeyArena (13,176); Seattle, Washington
Aeropostle Classic
12/19/2009*; 1:00 pm, CBS	No. 15	vs. No. 7 Duke	L 76–41	8–3	Madison Square Garden (14,554); New York, New York
12/28/2009*; 6:00 pm, KHQ-TV/FSN		Eastern Washington	W 94–52	9–3	McCarthey Athletic Center (6,000); Spokane, Washington
Ronald McDonald House Charities Classic
12/31/2009*; 7:00 pm, ESPN2		vs. Oklahoma	W 83–69	10–3	Spokane Arena (11,452); Spokane, Washington
01/02/2010*; 10:00 am, CBS		vs. Illinois	W 85–83 ^{OT}	11–3	United Center (20,917); Chicago, Illinois
01/09/2010; 7:00 pm, ESPNU	No. 19	at Portland	W 81–78	12–3 (1–0)	Chiles Center (5,003); Portland, Oregon
01/14/2010; 8:00 pm, ESPN2	No. 17	at Saint Mary's	W 89–82	13–3 (2–0)	McKeon Pavilion (3,500); Moraga, California
01/16/2010; 6:00 pm, KHQ-TV/FSN	No. 17	at San Diego	W 68–50	14–3 (3–0)	Jenny Craig Pavilion (4,158); San Diego, California
01/21/2010; 6:00 pm, KHQ-TV/FSN	No. 15	Pepperdine	W 91–84	15–3 (4–0)	McCarthey Athletic Center (6,000); Spokane, Washington
01/23/2010; 5:00 pm, KHQ-TV/FSN	No. 15	Loyola Marymount	W 85–69	16–3 (5–0)	McCarthey Athletic Center (6,000); Spokane, Washington
01/28/2010; 8:00 pm, ESPN2	No. 13	at Santa Clara	W 71–64	17–3 (6–0)	Leavey Center (4,700); Santa Clara, California
01/30/2010; 6:30 pm, KHQ-TV/FSN	No. 13	at San Francisco	L 81–77 ^{OT}	17–4 (6–1)	War Memorial Gymnasium (4,114); San Francisco, California
02/04/2010; 8:00 pm, ESPN2	No. 17	Portland	W 76–49	18–4 (7–1)	McCarthey Athletic Center (6,000); Spokane, Washington
02/06/2010*; 2:00 pm, ESPN2	No. 17	at Memphis	W 66–58	19–4 (7–1)	FedEx Forum (17,037); Memphis, Tennessee
02/11/2010; 8:00 pm, ESPN2	No. 16	Saint Mary's	W 80–61	20–4 (8–1)	McCarthey Athletic Center (6,000); Spokane, Washington
02/13/2010; 7:00 pm, ESPNU	No. 16	San Diego	W 82–65	21–4 (9–1)	McCarthey Athletic Center (6,000); Spokane, Washington
02/18/2010; 6:00 pm, KAYU/FSN	No. 13	at Loyola Marymount	L 74–66	21–5 (9–2)	Gersten Pavilion (3,770); Los Angeles, California
02/20/2010; 6:00 pm, KAYU/FSN	No. 13	at Pepperdine	W 72–54	22–5 (10–2)	Firestone Fieldhouse (3,021); Malibu, California
02/25/2010; 8:00 pm, ESPN2	No. 18	Santa Clara	W 88–51	23–5 (11–2)	McCarthey Athletic Center (6,000); Spokane, Washington
02/27/2010; 5:00 pm, KAYU/FSN	No. 18	San Francisco	W 75–69	24–5 (12–2)	McCarthey Athletic Center (6,000); Spokane, Washington
03/02/2010*; 6:00 pm, KHQ-TV/FSN	No. 18	Cal State Bakersfield	W 78–59	25–5 (12–2)	McCarthey Athletic Center (6,000); Spokane, Washington
West Coast Conference tournament
03/07/2010; 5:30 pm, ESPN2	No. 18	vs. Loyola Marymount; WCC Tournament Semi-Finals	W 77–62	26–5	Orleans Arena (7,941); Paradise, Nevada
03/08/2010; 6:00 pm, ESPN	No. 18	vs. Saint Mary's; WCC Tournament Final	L 81–62	26–6	Orleans Arena (7,726); Paradise, Nevada
2010 NCAA Division I men's basketball tournament
03/19/2010*; 4:10 pm, CBS	No. 22	vs. Florida State; First Round	W 67–60	27–6	HSBC Arena; Buffalo, New York
03/21/2010*; 9:10 am, CBS	No. 22	vs. No. 4 Syracuse; Second Round	L 87–65	27–7	HSBC Arena (18,934); Buffalo, New York
*Non-conference game. ^{#}Rankings from AP Poll. (#) Tournament seedings in parentheses. All times are in Pacific Time.
