= Randy Bennett =

American basketball player and basketball coach

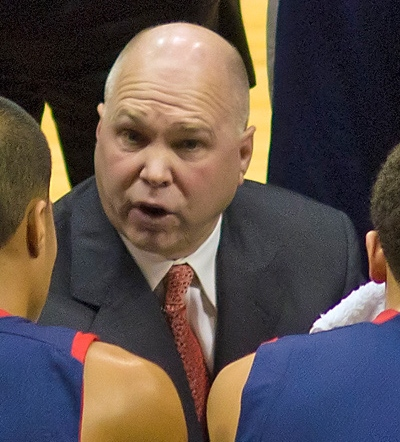
- Bennett coaching his team at the Jenny Craig Pavilion in 2012

Current position
- Title: Head coach
- Team: Arizona State
- Conference: Big 12
- Record: 3–0 (1.000)

Biographical details
- Born: June 9, 1962 (age 64); Mesa, Arizona, U.S.

Playing career
- 1980–1982: Mesa CC
- 1983–1985: UC San Diego
- Position: Guard

Coaching career (HC unless noted)
- 1985–1986: San Diego (volunteer assistant)
- 1986–1988: Idaho (graduate assistant)
- 1988–1996: San Diego (assistant)
- 1996–1999: Pepperdine (assistant)
- 1999–2001: Saint Louis (assistant)
- 2001–2026: Saint Mary's
- 2026–present: Arizona State

Head coaching record
- Overall: 592–228 (.722)
- Tournaments: 7–12 (NCAA Division I); 7–7 (NIT)

Accomplishments and honors

Championships
- 4 WCC tournament (2010, 2012, 2019, 2024); 7 WCC regular season (2011, 2012, 2016, 2023–2026)

Awards
- 7× WCC Coach of the Year (2008, 2011, 2016, 2022–2025)

Randall William Bennett (born June 9, 1962) is an American college basketball coach and former guard who is the head coach of the Arizona State Sun Devils men's basketball team. He previously served as the head coach at Saint Mary's Gaels men's basketball from 2001 to 2026.

Bennett led Saint Mary's to multiple NCAA tournament appearances and established the program as a consistent contender in the WCC, winning seven regular season championships and four conference tournament titles.

== Early life and college playing career ==
Born in Mesa, Arizona, Bennett graduated from Westwood High School in Mesa and began his collegiate career at Mesa Community College, playing under his father Tom from 1980 to 1982. Bennett then transferred to the University of California, San Diego (UC San Diego). As a senior in the 1984–85 season, Bennett averaged 7.0 points and 1.5 rebounds. Bennett graduated from UC San Diego in 1986 with a bachelor's degree in biology.

== Coaching career ==
=== Assistant coach (1985–2001) ===
While completing his degree at UC San Diego, Bennett began his coaching career in the 1985–86 season as an assistant coach at the University of San Diego under Hank Egan. Bennett then coached at Idaho under Tim Floyd from 1986 to 1988. After two seasons at Idaho, Bennett returned to the University of San Diego and rejoined Egan's staff as an assistant coach. In 1994, Brad Holland replaced Egan and retained Bennett, until Bennett left in 1996 to be assistant at Pepperdine under Lorenzo Romar.

In 1999, Bennett followed Romar to Saint Louis.

=== Saint Mary's (2001–26) ===
Bennett became a head coach for the first time in 2001 when Saint Mary's College of California hired him. Inheriting a team that won only two games the previous season, Bennett improved his team's win–loss totals every season until 2004–05, when Saint Mary's went 25–9 with a berth in the NCAA tournament. Bennett has led Saint Mary's to the NCAA Tournament in 2005, 2008, 2010, 2012, 2013, 2017, 2019, 2022, 2023, 2024, 2025 and 2026 and the National Invitation Tournament in 2009, 2011, 2014, 2015, 2016, 2018 and 2021.

Given this success, Bennett was often linked to several coaching jobs in higher profile conferences, including at California, Oregon State, Oregon, Utah and Arizona State.

In 2017, Bennett signed a ten-year extension to remain at Saint Mary's through 2026–27.

=== Arizona State (2026–present) ===
On March 23, 2026, Arizona State University announced that Bennett would be the next head coach of the Arizona State Sun Devils men's basketball team. The move served as a homecoming for Bennett, who grew up in Mesa, Arizona, part of the greater Phoenix metropolitan area.

== Head coaching record ==
Record table
| Season | Team | Overall | Conference | Standing | Postseason |
|---|---|---|---|---|---|
Saint Mary's Gaels (West Coast Conference) (2001–2026)
| 2001–02 | Saint Mary's | 9–20 | 3–11 | 6th | |
| 2002–03 | Saint Mary's | 15–15 | 6–8 | 5th | |
| 2003–04 | Saint Mary's | 19–12 | 9–5 | T–2nd | |
| 2004–05 | Saint Mary's | 25–9 | 11–3 | 2nd | NCAA Division I Round of 64 |
| 2005–06 | Saint Mary's | 17–12 | 8–6 | T–2nd | |
| 2006–07 | Saint Mary's | 17–15 | 8–6 | T–3rd | |
| 2007–08 | Saint Mary's | 25–7 | 12–2 | 2nd | NCAA Division I Round of 64 |
| 2008–09 | Saint Mary's | 28–7 | 10–4 | 2nd | NIT quarterfinal |
| 2009–10 | Saint Mary's | 28–6 | 11–3 | 2nd | NCAA Division I Sweet 16 |
| 2010–11 | Saint Mary's | 25–9 | 11–3 | T–1st | NIT first round |
| 2011–12 | Saint Mary's | 27–6 | 14–2 | 1st | NCAA Division I Round of 64 |
| 2012–13 | Saint Mary's | 28–7 | 14–2 | 2nd | NCAA Division I Round of 64 |
| 2013–14 | Saint Mary's | 23–12 | 11–7 | 4th | NIT second round |
| 2014–15 | Saint Mary's | 21–10 | 13–5 | T–2nd | NIT first round |
| 2015–16 | Saint Mary's | 29–6 | 15–3 | T–1st | NIT quarterfinal |
| 2016–17 | Saint Mary's | 29–5 | 16–2 | 2nd | NCAA Division I Round of 32 |
| 2017–18 | Saint Mary's | 30–6 | 16–2 | 2nd | NIT quarterfinal |
| 2018–19 | Saint Mary's | 22–12 | 11–5 | T–2nd | NCAA Division I Round of 64 |
| 2019–20 | Saint Mary's | 26–8 | 11–5 | T–3rd | Postseason not held |
| 2020–21 | Saint Mary's | 14–10 | 4–6 | 7th | NIT first round |
| 2021–22 | Saint Mary's | 26–8 | 12–3 | 2nd | NCAA Division I Round of 32 |
| 2022–23 | Saint Mary's | 27–8 | 14–2 | T–1st | NCAA Division I Round of 32 |
| 2023–24 | Saint Mary's | 26–8 | 15–1 | 1st | NCAA Division I Round of 64 |
| 2024–25 | Saint Mary's | 29–6 | 17–1 | 1st | NCAA Division I Round of 32 |
| 2025–26 | Saint Mary's | 27–6 | 16–2 | T–1st | NCAA Division I Round of 64 |
| Saint Mary's: | | 589–228 (.721) | 304–99 (.754) | | |
Arizona State Sun Devils (Big 12 Conference) (2026–present)
| 2026–27 | Arizona State | 3–0 | 0–0 | | |
| Arizona State: | | 3–0 (1.000) | 0–0 (–) | | |
| Total: | | 592–228 (.722) | | | |
National champion Postseason invitational champion Conference regular season champion Conference regular season and conference tournament champion Division regular season champion Division regular season and conference tournament champion Conference tournament champion
