= Dobson High School =

- Home of the Mustangs

Location
- 1501 W Guadalupe Rd; Mesa, Arizona 85202; United States; 33°21′44″N 111°52′05″W

Information
- Type: Public secondary
- Motto: Success for each student
- Established: 1981
- NCES District ID: 0404970
- NCES School ID: 040497001132
- Principal: Gabrielle Buckley
- Teaching staff: 121.70 (FTE)
- Grades: 9-12
- Enrollment: 2,341 (2023-2024)
- Student to teacher ratio: 19.24
- Colors: Silver and blue
- Mascot: Mustang
- Website: Homepage

Dobson High School is a public high school located in Mesa, Arizona, United States. It is one of six high schools in Mesa Public Schools and serves grades 9-12. Rhodes and Summit Academy feed students into Dobson. The school's mascot is a Mustang and the school colors are royal blue and silver.

Opened in 1981, Dobson sits on 84 acres (340,000 m^{2}) of public land. The school is named after the Dobson family, who moved to the area in 1886 and established a large ranch which includes the land where the school is now located.

In the 1986-87 school year, it was honored as a Blue Ribbon school.

In 2009, President Barack Obama made a speech at the school, announcing a mortgage relief plan.

Two episodes of MTV's Made have been filmed on campus.

The current principal is Gabrielle Buckley (herself a graduate of Dobson, class of 1995.) Three assistant principals, Renee Regoli, Christina Sweador, and Jacob Fendley, comprise the rest of the administration.

== Demographics ==
During the 2023-2024 school year, the demographic break of the 2,341 students enrolled was:

- Male - 51.4%
- Female - 48.6%
- Native American/Alaskan - 7.3%
- Asian - 2.3%
- Black - 7.6%
- Hispanic - 52.5%
- Native Hawaiian/Pacific Islander - 1.1%
- White - 25.9%
- Multiracial - 3.3%

== Athletics ==
Offered Athletics:

- Badminton
- Cross Country
- Football
- Pom & Cheer
- Beach Volleyball
- Swim & Dive
- B/G Golf
- B/G Volleyball
- B/G Basketball
- B/G Soccer
- B/G Tennis
- Wrestling
- Baseball
- Softball
- Track & Field
- JROTC

== Feeder schools ==
Junior High Schools that feed into Dobson High School include:

- Carson Junior High School
- Kino Junior High School
- Rhodes Junior High School
- Summit Academy (IB Program)

== Notable alumni ==
- 1985: Paul Swingle, former MLB player (California Angels)
- 1986: Marianne Dissard, singer and filmmaker
- 2000: Nick DeWitz, professional basketball player
- 2000: Chez Reavie, professional golfer (2x PGA Tour winner)
- 2007: Mickey McConnell, professional basketball player
- 2010: Julie Ertz, defender for the United States women's national soccer team (did not play soccer at Dobson)
- 2014: Kodi Justice, professional basketball player
- Tanisha Harper, actress and model
