= Greg Ballard (basketball) =

American basketball player (1955–2016)

Personal information
- Born: January 29, 1955 Los Angeles, California, U.S.
- Died: November 9, 2016 (aged 61)
- Listed height: 6 ft 7 in (2.01 m)
- Listed weight: 215 lb (98 kg)

Career information
- High school: Garey (Pomona, California)
- College: Oregon (1973–1977)
- NBA draft: 1977: 1st round, 4th overall pick
- Drafted by: Washington Bullets
- Playing career: 1977–1989
- Position: Power forward
- Number: 42, 4, 5

Career history
- 1977–1985: Washington Bullets
- 1985–1987: Golden State Warriors
- 1987–1988: VL Pesaro
- 1989: Libertas Forlì
- 1989: Seattle SuperSonics

Career highlights
- NBA champion (1978); Consensus second-team All-American (1977); 2× First-team All-Pac-8 (1976, 1977)

Career NBA statistics
- Points: 9,953 (12.4 ppg)
- Rebounds: 4,858 (6.1 rpg)
- Assists: 1,733 (2.2 apg)
- Stats at NBA.com
- Stats at Basketball Reference

Gregory Ballard (January 29, 1955 – November 9, 2016) was an American professional basketball player and NBA assistant coach. A collegiate All-American at Oregon, Ballard averaged 12.4 points and 6.1 rebounds over an eleven-season NBA career with the Washington Bullets, Golden State Warriors and briefly, the Seattle SuperSonics.

== Early life ==
Born in Los Angeles to parents William Ballard and Annie Clark, Ballard had three brothers and four sisters. Ballard graduated from Garey High School in Pomona, California, in 1973, where he also played baseball. A pitcher, Ballard was selected by the Montreal Expos in the 10th round (137th overall) of the 1973 Amateur Draft.

== College career ==
Ballard chose basketball and attended the University of Oregon, where he played in the collegiate level at the forward position. Playing for Coach Dick Harter at Oregon, from 1973 to 1977, Ballard played 115 career games on Oregon teams with the nickname "Kamikaze Kids," along with teammates Ernie Kent, Stu Jackson and Ron Lee.

In his career at Oregon, Ballard had 1,114 career rebounds, still the most in program history, averaging 9.7 rebounds. He averaged 15.9 points, with his 1,829 total career points, ranking fourth in school history.

Ballard set Oregon's single-game scoring record of 43 points, in a National Invitation Tournament game against Oral Roberts University on March 9, 1977.

== NBA career ==
=== Washington Bullets (1977–1985) ===
Ballard was selected by the Washington Bullets with the 4th overall pick in the 1st round of the 1977 NBA draft, behind Kent Benson (Milwaukee Bucks), Otis Birdsong (Kansas City Kings), and Marques Johnson (Milwaukee Bucks). As a rookie in 1977–1978, Ballard averaged 4.9 points and 3.5 rebounds in 76 games as a key reserve for Coach Dick Motta, playing beside Naismith Basketball Hall of Fame inductees Wes Unseld and Elvin Hayes, along with Mitch Kupchak, Phil Chenier Bob Dandridge and Kevin Grevey. The Bullets defeated the Atlanta Hawks (2–0), San Antonio Spurs (4–2) and Philadelphia 76ers (4–2) in the Eastern Conference Playoffs.

In the 1978 NBA Finals, the Bullets defeated the Seattle SuperSonics 4–3 to capture the NBA Championship. Averaging 10 minutes per game in the series, Ballard averaged 3.7 points, 4.2 rebounds and 1.5 assists.

In 1978–1979, Ballard averaged 7.8 points, 5.5 rebounds and 1.4 assists as the Bullets finished 54–28. They defeated the Atlanta Hawks (4–3) and San Antonio Spurs (4–3) in the Eastern Conference Playoffs. In the 1979 NBA Finals, the Bullets again met the SuperSonics, but were defeated 4–1 in the rematch, as Ballard averaged 7.6 points and 5.6 rebounds in the series.

Ballard became a starter for the Bullets in 1979–1980, averaging 15.6 points, 7.8 rebounds, 1.9 assists and 1.1 steals. The Bullets lost in the first round of the playoffs to Philadelphia (2–0).

Ballard averaged 15.5 points, 7.1 rebounds and 2.4 assists under new Coach Gene Shue in 1980–1981, as Washington finished 39–43 and missed the playoffs.

Becoming the Bullets' leading scorer in 1981–1982, Ballard averaged 18.8 points along with 8.0 rebounds, 3.2 assists and 1.7 steals. The Bullets defeated the New Jersey Nets 2–0 in the Eastern Conference playoffs before losing to the Boston Celtics with Larry Bird, Kevin McHale and Robert Parish 4–1.

Playing on the front line with Jeff Ruland and Rick Mahorn in 1982–1983, Ballard averaged 18.0 points, 6.5 rebounds, 3.4 assists and 1.7 steals, as the Bullets finished 42–40, missing the playoffs.

Washington returned to the playoffs in 1983–1984, with Ballard averaging 14.6 points, 6.0 rebounds, 3.5 assists and 1.1 steals. The Bullets were defeated by eventual NBA Champion Boston 3–1, as Ballard averaged 16.5 points and 6.0 rebounds in the series.

Ballard averaged 13.1 points, 6.5 rebounds and 2.5 assists in 1984–1985. Washington finished 40–42, losing in the playoffs to the Philadelphia 76ers 3–1.

=== Golden State Warriors (1985–1987) ===
On June 17, 1985, Ballard was traded by the Washington Bullets to the Golden State Warriors for a 1985 2nd round draft pick (Manute Bol was later selected) and a 1987 2nd round draft pick (Duane Washington was later selected). Ballard then averaged 7.9 points, 4.8 rebounds and 1.2 assists in two seasons with Golden State and Coach George Karl as a key reserve, playing with Sleepy Floyd, Joe Barry Carroll, Chris Mullin and Terry Teagle.

=== Albany Patroons/Seattle SuperSonics (1988–1989) ===
On July 1, 1988, Ballard was released by the Golden State Warriors after not playing in 1987–1988. In 1988–1989, He worked under Coach George Karl as a player/assistant coach with the Albany Patroons of the Continental Basketball Association and averaged 8.1 points, 5.3 rebounds with 1.4 assists per game in his 7-game career with the Albany. On February 13, 1989, he signed a 10-day contract with the Seattle SuperSonics and appeared in his final two NBA games.

In 807 career games, Ballard had career averages of 12.1 points, 6.2 rebounds, 2.2 assists and 1.1 steals.

== Coaching/scouting career ==
Ballard became a coach and scout after his playing career ended. In 1989, Ballard was as an assistant coach for Il Messaggero Roma in Italy. Until his death, he was an assistant coach and a scout in the NBA. Ballard worked a total of 21 seasons as an assistant coach and a scout for a number of franchises, including the Atlanta Hawks, Minnesota Timberwolves and Dallas Mavericks.

== NBA career statistics ==
Legend
| GP | Games played | GS | Games started | MPG | Minutes per game |
| FG% | Field goal percentage | 3P% | 3-point field goal percentage | FT% | Free throw percentage |
| RPG | Rebounds per game | APG | Assists per game | SPG | Steals per game |
| BPG | Blocks per game | PPG | Points per game | **Bold** | Career high |
| † | Won an NBA championship | * | Led the league |

=== Regular season ===
| Year | Team | GP | GS | MPG | FG% | 3P% | FT% | RPG | APG | SPG | BPG | PPG |
|---|---|---|---|---|---|---|---|---|---|---|---|---|
| 1977–78† | Washington | 76 | — | 12.3 | .425 | — | .772 | 3.5 | .8 | .4 | .2 | 4.9 |
| 1978–79 | Washington | **82*** | — | 18.9 | .465 | — | .692 | 5.5 | 1.4 | .9 | .4 | 7.8 |
| 1979–80 | Washington | **82** | — | 29.7 | **.495** | .340 | .753 | 7.8 | 1.9 | 1.1 | .4 | 15.6 |
| 1980–81 | Washington | **82** | — | 31.8 | .463 | .219 | .847 | 7.1 | 2.4 | 1.4 | **.5** | 15.5 |
| 1981–82 | Washington | 79 | 79 | **37.3** | .475 | .409 | .830 | **8.0** | 3.2 | **1.7** | .3 | **18.8** |
| 1982–83 | Washington | 78 | 78 | 36.4 | .473 | .351 | .781 | 6.5 | 3.4 | **1.7** | .3 | 18.0 |
| 1983–84 | Washington | **82*** | **82** | 32.9 | .481 | .133 | .798 | 6.0 | **3.5** | 1.1 | .4 | 14.5 |
| 1984–85 | Washington | **82*** | 77 | 32.5 | .480 | .304 | .795 | 6.5 | 2.5 | 1.2 | .4 | 13.1 |
| 1985–86 | Golden State | 75 | 14 | 23.9 | .477 | **.486** | .802 | 5.6 | 1.1 | .9 | .1 | 8.8 |
| 1986–87 | Golden State | **82*** | 7 | 19.3 | .440 | .375 | .747 | 4.1 | 1.3 | .6 | .2 | 7.1 |
| 1988–89 | Seattle | 2 | 0 | 7.5 | .125 | .000 | **1.000** | 3.5 | .0 | .0 | .0 | 3.0 |
| Career | | 802 | 337 | 27.5 | .472 | .338 | .787 | 6.1 | 2.2 | 1.1 | .3 | 12.4 |

=== Playoffs ===
| Year | Team | GP | GS | MPG | FG% | 3P% | FT% | RPG | APG | SPG | BPG | PPG |
|---|---|---|---|---|---|---|---|---|---|---|---|---|
| 1978† | Washington | **19** | — | 12.8 | .333 | — | .780 | 4.2 | .9 | .5 | .2 | 3.9 |
| 1979 | Washington | **19*** | — | 16.4 | .525 | — | .756 | 4.8 | .9 | .5 | .3 | 7.2 |
| 1980 | Washington | 2 | — | 36.5 | .321 | — | .571 | 7.0 | **3.5** | .5 | .5 | 11.0 |
| 1982 | Washington | 7 | — | 38.3 | .360 | — | .840 | **9.0** | 3.1 | **2.0** | .4 | 13.3 |
| 1984 | Washington | 4 | — | **42.0** | .458 | .000 | **.923** | 6.0 | **3.5** | 1.8 | **.8** | **16.5** |
| 1985 | Washington | 4 | 0 | 16.3 | .458 | .000 | .889 | 3.5 | 1.5 | .8 | .0 | 7.5 |
| 1987 | Golden State | 10 | 0 | 17.9 | **.542** | **.400** | .750 | 4.0 | 1.9 | .8 | .0 | 5.9 |
| Career | | 65 | 0 | 23.1 | .433 | .308 | .793 | 5.0 | 1.6 | .8 | .2 | 7.4 |

== Personal life ==
Ballard died on November 9, 2016, from prostate cancer. Ballard was survived by his wife Donna, and their children, Lawrence, Gabrielle and Gregory Jr.

Gary Schmidt, a colleague as a scout for the Boston Celtics said "I found him to be one of the most humble people I have ever met in my life, "there was no agenda, there was no attitude, there was no hey-I-played-in-the-league. He was so down to Earth and humble. Just a very good person. Always positive and upbeat.”

== Honors ==
- Ballard was inducted into the University of Oregon Athletic Hall of Fame in 1993.
- In 1996, Ballard was inducted into the state of Oregon Sports Hall of Fame.
- Ballard was a Pac-12 Conference Hall of Honor inductee in 2009
