= 1997–98 San Francisco Dons men's basketball team =

American college basketball season

1997–98 San Francisco Dons men's basketball

West Coast Conference tournament champions

NCAA Tournament
- Conference: West Coast Conference
- Record: 19–11 (7–7 WCC)
- Head coach: Philip Mathews (3rd season)
- Home arena: War Memorial Gymnasium

1997–98 West Coast Conference men's basketball standings
	Conf.				Overall
Team	W		L	PCT	W		L	PCT
Gonzaga	10	–	4	.714	24	–	10	.706
Pepperdine	9	–	5	.643	17	–	10	.630
Santa Clara	8	–	6	.571	18	–	10	.643
Saint Mary's	7	–	7	.500	11	–	15	.423
San Francisco †	7	–	7	.500	19	–	11	.633
Portland	7	–	7	.500	14	–	13	.519
San Diego	5	–	9	.357	14	–	14	.500
Loyola Marymount	3	–	11	.214	7	–	20	.259
† Conference tournament winner Rankings from AP poll

The 1997–98 San Francisco Dons men's basketball team represented the University of San Francisco as a member of the West Coast Conference during the 1997–98 NCAA Division I men's basketball season. The Dons, led by head coach Philip Mathews, finished the season with a 19–11 record (7–7 WCAC), won the WCC tournament, and received an automatic bid to the NCAA Tournament as No. 14 seed in the West region. San Francisco was defeated by eventual National runner-up Utah in the opening round.

The appearance in the NCAA tournament was the first for the Dons in 16 years.

== Roster ==
1997–98 San Francisco Dons men's basketball team
Players
Coaches

Pos.	#	Name	Height	Weight	Year	Hometown
F		Ime Udoka	6 ft 6 in (1.98 m)	—	Jr	Portland, Oregon
F	41	Hakeem Ward	6 ft 6 in (1.98 m)	—	Sr

Head coach

- Philip Mathews (UC Irvine)

Assistant coach(es)

Legend

- (C) Team captain
- (S) Suspended
- (I) Ineligible
- (W) Walk-on
- Injured
- Current redshirt

== Schedule and results ==
Date time, TV	Rank^{#}	Opponent^{#}	Result	Record	Site city, state
Non-conference regular season
Nov 15, 1997*		at UC Irvine	W 75–59	1–0	Bren Events Center; Irvine, California
Nov 22, 1997*		at Saint Louis	L 56–80	1–1	Kiel Center; St. Louis, Missouri
Nov 25, 1997*		San Jose State	W 84–52	2–1	War Memorial Gymnasium; San Francisco, California
Dec 2, 1997*		California	W 59–50	3–1	War Memorial Gymnasium; San Francisco, California
Dec 5, 1997*		Monmouth; Northwestern Mutual Classic	W 85–36	4–1	War Memorial Gymnasium; San Francisco, California
Dec 6, 1997*		Richmond; Northwestern Mutual Classic	W 64–60	5–1	War Memorial Gymnasium; San Francisco, California
Dec 12, 1997*		vs. Idaho State; Boilermaker Invitational	W 85–56	6–1	Mackey Arena; West Lafayette, Indiana
Dec 13, 1997*		at No. 8 Purdue; Boilermaker Invitational	L 82–107	6–2	Mackey Arena; West Lafayette, Indiana
Dec 20, 1997*		UC Santa Barbara	W 71–60	7–2	War Memorial Gymnasium; San Francisco, California
Dec 22, 1997*		vs. Indiana; Pete Newell Challenge	L 52–65	7–3	The Arena in Oakland; Oakland, California
Dec 30, 1997*		at Lamar	W 56–46	8–3	Montagne Center; Beaumont, Texas
Jan 3, 1998*		Belmont	W 66–46	9–3	War Memorial Gymnasium; San Francisco, California
WCC Regular season
Jan 8, 1998		at San Diego	W 64–61 ^{OT}	10–3 (1–0)	USD Sports Center; San Diego, California
Jan 10, 1998		at Saint Mary's	L 68–85	10–4 (1–1)	University Credit Union Pavilion; Moraga, California
Jan 16, 1998		Loyola Marymount	W 85–61	11–4 (2–1)	War Memorial Gymnasium; San Francisco, California
Jan 17, 1998		Pepperdine	L 58–63	11–5 (2–2)	War Memorial Gymnasium; San Francisco, California
Jan 22, 1998		Santa Clara	L 57–63	11–6 (2–3)	War Memorial Gymnasium; San Francisco, California
Jan 24, 1998		at Santa Clara	W 83–75 ^{OT}	12–6 (3–3)	Toso Pavilion; Santa Clara, California
Jan 29, 1998		at Gonzaga	L 72–76 ^{OT}	12–7 (3–4)	Charlotte Y. Martin Centre; Spokane, Washington
Jan 31, 1998		at Portland	L 62–69	12–8 (3–5)	Chiles Center; Portland, Oregon
Feb 6, 1998		Portland	W 75–63	13–8 (4–5)	War Memorial Gymnasium; San Francisco, California
Feb 7, 1998		Gonzaga	L 85–96	13–9 (4–6)	War Memorial Gymnasium; San Francisco, California
Feb 13, 1998		at Pepperdine	L 61–65	13–10 (4–7)	Firestone Fieldhouse; Malibu, California
Feb 14, 1998		at Loyola Marymount	W 86–52	14–10 (5–7)	Gersten Pavilion; Los Angeles, California
Feb 20, 1998		Saint Mary's	W 109–83	15–10 (6–7)	War Memorial Gymnasium; San Francisco, California
Feb 21, 1998		San Diego	W 81–59	16–10 (7–7)	War Memorial Gymnasium; San Francisco, California
WCC tournament
Feb 28, 1998*	(5)	vs. (4) Saint Mary's; Quarterfinals	W 83–66	17–10	Toso Pavilion; Santa Clara, California
Mar 1, 1998*	(5)	at (3) Santa Clara; Semifinals	W 85–83	18–10	Toso Pavilion; Santa Clara, California
Mar 2, 1998*; 9:00 pm, ESPN	(5)	vs. (1) Gonzaga; Championship game	W 80–67	19–10	Toso Pavilion; Santa Clara, California
NCAA tournament
Mar 12, 1998*	(14 W)	vs. (3 W) No. 7 Utah; First round	L 68–85	19–11	BSU Pavilion; Boise, Idaho
*Non-conference game. ^{#}Rankings from AP Poll. (#) Tournament seedings in parentheses. W=West. All times are in Pacific Time.
