= 1996–97 Gonzaga Bulldogs men's basketball team =

American college basketball season

1996–97 Gonzaga Bulldogs men's basketball
- Conference: West Coast Conference
- Record: 15–12 (8–6 WCC)
- Head coach: Dan Fitzgerald (15th season)
- Assistant coaches: Dan Monson (9th season); Mark Few (8th season); Bill Grier (6th season)
- Home arena: Charlotte Y. Martin Centre

1996–97 West Coast Conference men's basketball standings
	Conf.				Overall
Team	W		L	PCT	W		L	PCT
Santa Clara	10	–	4	.714	16	–	11	.593
Saint Mary's †	10	–	4	.714	23	–	8	.742
San Francisco	9	–	5	.643	16	–	13	.552
San Diego	8	–	6	.571	17	–	11	.607
Gonzaga	8	–	6	.571	15	–	12	.556
Portland	4	–	10	.286	9	–	18	.333
Pepperdine	4	–	10	.286	6	–	21	.222
Loyola Marymount	3	–	11	.214	7	–	21	.250
† 1997 WCC tournament winner Rankings from AP poll

The 1996–97 Gonzaga Bulldogs men's basketball team represented Gonzaga University in the West Coast Conference (WCC) during the 1996–97 NCAA Division I men's basketball season. Led by fifteenth-year head coach Dan Fitzgerald, the Bulldogs were 15–11 (.577) overall in the regular season (8–6 in WCC, tied for fourth), and played their home games on campus at the Charlotte Y. Martin Centre in Spokane, Washington.

As announced two years earlier, athletic director Fitzgerald stepped down as head coach after the season, and nine-year assistant Dan Monson was promoted.

== Postseason results ==
Date time, TV	Rank^{#}	Opponent^{#}	Result	Record	Site (attendance) city, state
WCC tournament
Sat, March 1	(5)	vs. (4) San Diego; Quarterfinal	L 59–64	15–12	Gersten Pavilion; Los Angeles, California
*Non-conference game. ^{#}Rankings from AP poll. (#) Tournament seedings in parentheses. All times are in Pacific time.
