= Kamikaze Kids =

The Kamikaze Kids were the Oregon Ducks men's basketball teams of 1971 to 1978. The teams were coached by Dick Harter until his departure in 1978. Harter hated the Ducks moniker and insisted that any media and public relations material refer to his teams only by the Kamikaze Kids. The Kamikaze Kids were known for their swarming defense that lead to two upsets of #1 UCLA. This era of Ducks basketball is often credited with starting the Mac Court reputation that carried on until the arena's closure in 2011. Legendary Ducks players Ernie Kent, Stu Jackson, Ron Lee, and Greg Ballard all played during the Kamikaze Kids era. Kent, who graduated in 1977, would go on to coach the Ducks from 1997 to 2010. During the Kamikaze Kids era the Ducks had two 20 win seasons and would play in three consecutive NITs including the 1974–75 season where the Ducks made it to the NIT semifinals ultimately finishing in third place.

== Seasons ==
Statistics overview
Season	Team	Overall	Conference	Standing	Postseason
University of Oregon (Pac-8 Conference) (1971–1978)
1971–72	Oregon	6–20	0–14		
1972–73	Oregon	16–10	8–6		
1973–74	Oregon	15–11	9–5		
1974–75	Oregon	21–9	6–8		NIT
1975–76	Oregon	19–11	10–4		NIT
1976–77	Oregon	19–10	9–5		NIT
1977–78	Oregon	16–11	6–8		
Oregon:		112–82	48–50		
Total:					
National champion Postseason invitational champion Conference regular season champion Conference regular season and conference tournament champion Division regular season champion Division regular season and conference tournament champion Conference tournament champion
