= 1997 West Coast Conference men's basketball tournament =

- Classification: Division I
- Season: 1996–97
- Teams: 8
- Site: Gersten Pavilion; Los Angeles, California
- Champions: Saint Mary's (1st title)
- Winning coach: Ernie Kent (1st title)
- MVP: Brad Millard (Saint Mary's)

1996–97 West Coast Conference men's basketball standings
	Conf.				Overall
Team	W		L	PCT	W		L	PCT
Santa Clara	10	–	4	.714	16	–	11	.593
Saint Mary's †	10	–	4	.714	23	–	8	.742
San Francisco	9	–	5	.643	16	–	13	.552
San Diego	8	–	6	.571	17	–	11	.607
Gonzaga	8	–	6	.571	15	–	12	.556
Portland	4	–	10	.286	9	–	18	.333
Pepperdine	4	–	10	.286	6	–	21	.222
Loyola Marymount	3	–	11	.214	7	–	21	.250
† 1997 WCC tournament winner Rankings from AP poll

The 1997 West Coast Conference men's basketball tournament took place during March 1–3, 1997. All rounds were held in Los Angeles, California at the Gersten Pavilion.

The Saint Mary's Gaels won the WCC Tournament title and an automatic bid to the 1997 NCAA tournament. Brad Millard of Saint Mary's was named Tournament MVP.

Also of note is that through the 2026 edition, this was the last WCC men's tournament in which Gonzaga did not make the final.

== Format ==
With eight teams participating, all eight teams were placed into the first round, with teams seeded and paired based on regular-season records. After the first round, teams were re-seeded so the highest-remaining team was paired with the lowest-remaining time in one semifinal with the other two teams slotted into the other semifinal.

== Bracket ==
Quarterfinals; Saturday, March 1
1	Santa Clara	61
8	Loyola Marymount	70
4	Gonzaga	59
5	San Diego	64
(Pairings are reseeded after the first round)
3	San Francisco	78
6	Portland	66
2	Saint Mary's	85
7	Pepperdine	69

Semifinals; Sunday, March 2
3	San Francisco	64
5	San Diego	61
8	Loyola Marymount	62
2	Saint Mary's	80

Finals; Monday, March 3
3	San Francisco	59
2	Saint Mary's	66
