= 1998 West Coast Conference men's basketball tournament =

- Classification: Division I
- Season: 1997–98
- Teams: 8
- Site: Toso Pavilion; Santa Clara, California
- Champions: San Francisco (1st title)
- Winning coach: Phil Mathews (1st title)
- MVP: Hakeem Ward (San Francisco)

1997–98 West Coast Conference men's basketball standings
	Conf.				Overall
Team	W		L	PCT	W		L	PCT
Gonzaga	10	–	4	.714	24	–	10	.706
Pepperdine	9	–	5	.643	17	–	10	.630
Santa Clara	8	–	6	.571	18	–	10	.643
Saint Mary's	7	–	7	.500	11	–	15	.423
San Francisco †	7	–	7	.500	19	–	11	.633
Portland	7	–	7	.500	14	–	13	.519
San Diego	5	–	9	.357	14	–	14	.500
Loyola Marymount	3	–	11	.214	7	–	20	.259
† Conference tournament winner Rankings from AP poll

The 1998 West Coast Conference men's basketball tournament took place on February 28–March 2, 1998. All rounds were held in Santa Clara, California, at the Toso Pavilion.

The San Francisco Dons won the WCC Tournament title and an automatic bid to the 1998 NCAA tournament. Hakeem Ward of San Francisco was named Tournament MVP.

== Format ==
With eight teams participating, all eight teams were placed into the first round, with teams seeded and paired based on regular-season records. After the first round, teams were re-seeded so the highest-remaining team was paired with the lowest-remaining time in one semifinal with the other two teams slotted into the other semifinal.

== Bracket ==
Quarter finals Saturday, February 28
1	Gonzaga	79*
8	Loyola Marymount	78
4	Saint Mary's	66
5	San Francisco	83
(Pairings are reseeded after the first round)
3	Santa Clara	74
6	Portland	53
2	Pepperdine	54
7	San Diego	56

Semi-finals; Sunday, March 1
1	Gonzaga	74
7	San Diego	59
3	Santa Clara	83
5	San Francisco	85

Finals; Monday, March 2
1	Gonzaga	67
5	San Francisco	80

* – denotes overtime period
