= 1996–97 Saint Mary's Gaels men's basketball team =

American college basketball season

1996–97 Saint Mary's Gaels men's basketball

WCC regular season co-champions WCC tournament champions

NCAA tournament, First Round
- Conference: West Coast Conference
- Record: 23–8 (12–4 WCC)
- Head coach: Ernie Kent (6th season)
- Home arena: McKeon Pavilion

1996–97 West Coast Conference men's basketball standings
	Conf.				Overall
Team	W		L	PCT	W		L	PCT
Santa Clara	10	–	4	.714	16	–	11	.593
Saint Mary's †	10	–	4	.714	23	–	8	.742
San Francisco	9	–	5	.643	16	–	13	.552
San Diego	8	–	6	.571	17	–	11	.607
Gonzaga	8	–	6	.571	15	–	12	.556
Portland	4	–	10	.286	9	–	18	.333
Pepperdine	4	–	10	.286	6	–	21	.222
Loyola Marymount	3	–	11	.214	7	–	21	.250
† 1997 WCC tournament winner Rankings from AP poll

The 1996–97 Saint Mary's Gaels men's basketball team represented Saint Mary's College of California in the 1996–97 college basketball season, coached by Ernie Kent for the 6th and final season. The Gaels competed in the West Coast Conference and played their home games at the McKeon Pavilion. They finished conference play with a record of 10–4 to place second. They won the 1997 West Coast Conference men's basketball tournament to receive an automatic bid to the 1997 NCAA Division I men's basketball tournament where they entered as the No. 14 seed West Region. The Gaels were beaten by No. 3 seed Wake Forest in the opening round to end their season 23–8.

== Roster ==
1996–97 Saint Mary's Gaels men's basketball team
Players	Coaches
Pos. / # / Name / Height / Weight / Year / Hometown; C / 52 / Brad Millard / 7 ft 3 in (2.21 m) / 345 lb (156 kg) / Fr / Seattle, Washington	Head coach: Ernie Kent; Assistant coach(es) Legend: (C) Team captain; (S) Suspended; (I) Ineligible; (W) Walk-on; Injured; Current redshirt

== Schedule and results ==
- All times are Pacific

Date time, TV	Rank^{#}	Opponent^{#}	Result	Record	Site (attendance) city, state
Regular season
Nov 20, 1996*		at Oklahoma State	L 70–71	0–1	Gallagher-Iba Arena; Stillwater, Oklahoma
Nov 24, 1996*		San Jose State	L 64–66	0–2	McKeon Pavilion; Moraga, California
Nov 26, 1996*		at Sacramento State	W 69–60	1–2	Hornets Nest; Sacramento, California
Dec 1, 1996*		UC Santa Barbara	W 94–86	2–2	McKeon Pavilion; Moraga, California
Feb 22, 1997		Portland	W 66–53	20–7 (10–4)	McKeon Pavilion; Moraga, California
WCC tournament
Mar 1, 1997*	(2)	vs. (7) Pepperdine; Quarterfinals	W 85–69	21–7	Gersten Pavilion; Los Angeles, California
Mar 2, 1997*	(2)	at (8) Loyola Marymount; Semifinals	W 80–62	22–7	Gersten Pavilion; Los Angeles, California
Mar 3, 1997*	(2)	vs. (3) San Francisco; Championship	W 66–59	23–7	Gersten Pavilion; Los Angeles, California
NCAA tournament
Mar 14, 1997*	(14 W)	vs. (3 W) No. 9 Wake Forest; First round	L 46–68	23–8	McKale Center; Tucson, Arizona
*Non-conference game. ^{#}Rankings from AP poll. (#) Tournament seedings in parentheses. W=West.
