= 1999 West Coast Conference men's basketball tournament =

- Classification: Division I
- Season: 1998–99
- Teams: 8
- Site: Toso Pavilion; Santa Clara, California
- Champions: Gonzaga (2nd title)
- Winning coach: Dan Monson (1st title)
- MVP: Matt Santangelo (Gonzaga)

1998–99 West Coast Conference men's basketball standings
	Conf.				Overall
Team	W		L	PCT	W		L	PCT
Gonzaga †	12	–	2	.857	28	–	7	.800
San Diego	9	–	5	.643	18	–	9	.667
Pepperdine	9	–	5	.643	19	–	13	.594
Santa Clara	8	–	6	.571	14	–	15	.483
Loyola Marymount	6	–	8	.429	11	–	16	.407
Saint Mary's	5	–	9	.357	13	–	18	.419
San Francisco	4	–	10	.286	12	–	18	.400
Portland	3	–	11	.214	9	–	18	.333
† 1999 WCC tournament winner Rankings from AP poll

The 1999 West Coast Conference men's basketball tournament took place on February 27–March 1, 1999. All rounds were held in Santa Clara, California at the Toso Pavilion.

The Gonzaga Bulldogs won the WCC Tournament title and an automatic bid to the 1999 NCAA tournament. Matt Santangelo of Gonzaga was named Tournament MVP.

== Format ==
With eight teams participating, all eight teams were placed into the first round, with teams seeded and paired based on regular-season records. After the first round, teams were re-seeded so the highest-remaining team was paired with the lowest-remaining time in one semifinal with the other two teams slotted into the other semifinal.

== Bracket ==
Quarter finals Saturday, February 27
1	Gonzaga	84
8	Portland	63
4	Santa Clara	77
5	Loyola Marymount	64
(Pairings are reseeded after the first round)
3	San Diego	60
6	Saint Mary's	65
2	Pepperdine	67
7	San Francisco	65

Semi-finals; Sunday, February 28
1	Gonzaga	70
6	Saint Mary's	57
2	Pepperdine	54
4	Santa Clara	58

Finals; Monday, March 1
1	Gonzaga	91
4	Santa Clara	66
