= 1998–99 Gonzaga Bulldogs men's basketball team =

American college basketball season

1998–99 Gonzaga Bulldogs men's basketball

WCC tournament champions WCC regular season champions

NCAA tournament, Elite Eight
- Conference: West Coast Conference

Ranking
- Coaches: No. 12
- Record: 28–7 (12–2 WCC)
- Head coach: Dan Monson (2nd season)
- Assistant coaches: Mark Few (10th season); Bill Grier (8th season); Scott Snider (1st season)
- Home arena: Charlotte Y. Martin Centre

1998–99 West Coast Conference men's basketball standings
	Conf.				Overall
Team	W		L	PCT	W		L	PCT
Gonzaga †	12	–	2	.857	28	–	7	.800
San Diego	9	–	5	.643	18	–	9	.667
Pepperdine	9	–	5	.643	19	–	13	.594
Santa Clara	8	–	6	.571	14	–	15	.483
Loyola Marymount	6	–	8	.429	11	–	16	.407
Saint Mary's	5	–	9	.357	13	–	18	.419
San Francisco	4	–	10	.286	12	–	18	.400
Portland	3	–	11	.214	9	–	18	.333
† 1999 WCC tournament winner Rankings from AP poll

The 1998–99 Gonzaga Bulldogs men's basketball team represented Gonzaga University in the West Coast Conference (WCC) during the 1998–99 NCAA Division I men's basketball season. Led by second-year head coach Dan Monson, the Bulldogs were 22–6 (.786) overall in the regular season (12–2 in WCC, first), and played their home games on campus at the Charlotte Y. Martin Centre in Spokane, Washington.

The top-seeded Zags won the conference tournament at Santa Clara, and were seeded tenth in the West regional of the NCAA tournament. Unranked and sent to Seattle, they recorded the program's first NCAA tournament wins with upsets of Minnesota and #7 Stanford, the region's second seed. In the Sweet Sixteen at Phoenix, Gonzaga edged sixth-seeded Florida by a point, but fell by five in the Elite Eight to third-ranked Connecticut, the eventual national champion, and finished at 28–7 (.800).

== Roster ==
1998–99 Gonzaga Bulldogs men's basketball team
Players
Coaches

Pos.	#	Name	Height	Weight	Year	Hometown
C	34	Jeremy Eaton	6 ft 11 in (2.11 m)	230 lb (104 kg)	RS Sr	Benton City, WA
F	22	Mike Leasure	6 ft 7 in (2.01 m)	190 lb (86 kg)	RS Sr	Spanaway, WA
G	11	Quentin Hall	5 ft 8 in (1.73 m)	160 lb (73 kg)	Sr	Nassau, Bahamas
G	13	Matt Santangelo	6 ft 1 in (1.85 m)	173 lb (78 kg)	RS Jr	Portland, OR
G	15	Ryan Floyd	6 ft 1 in (1.85 m)	185 lb (84 kg)	RS Jr	Harrington, WA
G	25	Mike Nilson	6 ft 5 in (1.96 m)	216 lb (98 kg)	RS Jr	Seattle, WA
G	24	Richie Frahm	6 ft 5 in (1.96 m)	203 lb (92 kg)	Jr	Battle Ground, WA
F/C	30	Axel Dench	6 ft 11 in (2.11 m)	243 lb (110 kg)	Jr	Melbourne, Australia
F	23	Mark Spink	6 ft 8 in (2.03 m)	200 lb (91 kg)	RS So	Bellingham, WA
F	31	Casey Calvary	6 ft 8 in (2.03 m)	215 lb (98 kg)	So	Tacoma, WA
F	32	Zach Gourde (redshirt)	6 ft 8 in (2.03 m)	245 lb (111 kg)	Fr	Vancouver, WA
F	21	Damany Hendrix (redshirt)	6 ft 5 in (1.96 m)	215 lb (98 kg)	Fr	Vallejo, CA
C	33	Eric Chilton (redshirt)	7 ft 1 in (2.16 m)	245 lb (111 kg)	Fr	Kelso, WA

Head coach

- Dan Monson (Idaho)

Assistant coach(es)

- Mark Few (Oregon)
- Bill Grier (Oregon)
- Scott Snider (Gonzaga)

Legend

- (C) Team captain
- (S) Suspended
- (I) Ineligible
- (W) Walk-on
- Injured
- Current redshirt

Roster
Last update: April 20, 2015

== Schedule ==
Date time, TV	Rank^{#}	Opponent^{#}	Result	Record	Site city, state
Regular Season
November 14*		at No. 8 Kansas	L 66–80	0–1	Allen Fieldhouse (16,300); Lawrence, KS
November 16*		at Memphis; Preseason NIT	W 88–73	1–1	The Pyramid (11,091); Memphis, TN
November 18*		at No. 15 Purdue; Preseason NIT	L 68–83	1–2	Mackey Arena (14,123); West Lafayette, IN
November 22*		Saint Martin's	W 82–55	2–2	Charlotte Y. Martin Centre (2,222); Spokane, WA
November 28*		Washington State	W 70–61	3–2	Spokane Arena (4,013); Spokane, WA
November 30*		at Eastern Washington	W 81–59	4–2	Reese Court (1,650); Cheney, WA
December 4*		vs. Detroit; Hawkeye Classic	L 48–49	4–3	Carver–Hawkeye Arena (15,500); Iowa City, IA
December 5*		vs. South Alabama; Hawkeye Classic	W 80–63	5–3	Carver–Hawkeye Arena (15,500); Iowa City, IA
December 8*		No. 22 Washington	W 82–71	6–3	Spokane Arena (4,368); Spokane, WA
December 19*		Chicago State	W 84–38	7–3	Charlotte Y. Martin Centre (2,984); Spokane, WA
December 22*		Idaho	W 94–55	8–3	Charlotte Y. Martin Centre (4,008); Spokane, WA
December 28*		at Texas–Pan American	W 74–73	9–3	UTPA Fieldhouse (4,105); Edinburg, TX
December 30*		at No. 24 TCU	L 87–90	9–4	Daniel–Meyer Coliseum (5,267); Fort Worth, TX
January 2*		at Boise State	W 68–58	10–4	BSU Pavilion (8,470); Boise, ID
January 7		Loyola Marymount	W 105–68	11–4 (1–0)	Charlotte Y. Martin Centre (3,911); Spokane, WA
January 9		Pepperdine	W 83–52	12–4 (2–0)	Charlotte Y. Martin Centre (4,012); Spokane, WA
January 13		Portland	W 104–57	13–4 (3–0)	Charlotte Y. Martin Centre (4,047); Spokane, WA
January 16		at Portland	W 82–73	14–4 (4–0)	Chiles Center (3,946); Portland, OR
January 22		at San Francisco	W 83–71	15–4 (5–0)	War Memorial Gymnasium (3,823); San Francisco, CA
January 23		at Santa Clara	W 71–69	16–4 (6–0)	Toso Pavilion (4,118); Santa Clara, CA
January 28		Santa Clara	W 70–52	17–4 (7–0)	Charlotte Y. Martin Centre (4,018); Spokane, WA
January 30		San Francisco	W 78–52	18–4 (8–0)	Charlotte Y. Martin Centre (4,008); Spokane, WA
February 4		at San Diego	L 59–75	18–5 (8–1)	USD Sports Center (2,378); San Diego, CA
February 6		at Saint Mary's	W 78–70	19–5 (9–1)	McKeon Pavilion (2,213); Moraga, CA
February 11		Saint Mary's	W 97–52	20–5 (10–1)	Charlotte Y. Martin Centre (4,002); Spokane, WA
February 13		San Diego	W 69–62	21–5 (11–1)	Charlotte Y. Martin Centre (4,021); Spokane, WA
February 19		at Pepperdine	L 70–75	21–6 (11–2)	Firestone Fieldhouse (2,685); Malibu, CA
February 20		at Loyola Marymount	W 85–72	22–6 (12–2)	Gersten Pavilion (1,690); Los Angeles, CA
WCC Tournament
February 27*	(1)	vs. (8) Portland; Quarterfinals	W 84–63	23–6	Toso Pavilion (2,396); Santa Clara, CA
February 28*	(1)	vs. (6) St. Mary's; Semifinals	W 70–57	24–6	Toso Pavilion (3,977); Santa Clara, CA
March 1*	(1)	vs. (4) Santa Clara; Championship	W 91–66	25–6	Toso Pavilion (5,092); Santa Clara, CA
NCAA tournament
March 11*	(10 W)	vs. (7 W) Minnesota; First Round	W 75–63	26–6	KeyArena (14,971); Seattle, WA
March 13*	(10 W)	vs. (2 W) No. 7 Stanford; Second Round	W 82–74	27–6	KeyArena (15,187); Seattle, WA
March 18*	(10 W)	vs. (6 W) No. 23 Florida; Sweet Sixteen	W 73–72	28–6	America West Arena (15,975); Phoenix, AZ
March 20*	(10 W)	vs. (1 W) No. 3 Connecticut; Elite Eight	L 62–67	28–7	America West Arena (18,053); Phoenix, AZ
*Non-conference game. ^{#}Rankings from AP poll. (#) Tournament seedings in parentheses. W=West Regional. All times are in Pacific time.
