= 1997–98 Gonzaga Bulldogs men's basketball team =

American college basketball season

1997–98 Gonzaga Bulldogs men's basketball

WCC regular season champions

National Invitation Tournament, Second round
- Conference: West Coast Conference
- Record: 24–10 (10–4 WCC)
- Head coach: Dan Monson (1st season)
- Assistant coaches: Mark Few (9th season); Bill Grier (7th season)
- Home arena: Charlotte Y. Martin Centre

1997–98 West Coast Conference men's basketball standings
	Conf.				Overall
Team	W		L	PCT	W		L	PCT
Gonzaga	10	–	4	.714	24	–	10	.706
Pepperdine	9	–	5	.643	17	–	10	.630
Santa Clara	8	–	6	.571	18	–	10	.643
Saint Mary's	7	–	7	.500	11	–	15	.423
San Francisco †	7	–	7	.500	19	–	11	.633
Portland	7	–	7	.500	14	–	13	.519
San Diego	5	–	9	.357	14	–	14	.500
Loyola Marymount	3	–	11	.214	7	–	20	.259
† Conference tournament winner Rankings from AP poll

The 1997–98 Gonzaga Bulldogs men's basketball team represented Gonzaga University in the West Coast Conference (WCC) during the 1997–98 NCAA Division I men's basketball season. Led by newly-promoted head coach Dan Monson, the Bulldogs were 21–8 (.724) overall in the regular season (10–4 in WCC, first), and played their home games on campus at the Charlotte Y. Martin Centre in Spokane, Washington.

Regular season conference champions, Gonzaga lost to San Francisco in the WCC tournament final at Santa Clara. In the National Invitation Tournament (NIT), they advanced to the second round, and finished at 24–10 (.706).

Conference honors went to Monson as coach of the year, the first rookie head coach to win a WCC regular season title, and senior forward Bakari Hendrix was the player of the year. He repeated as the league's top scorer and was player of the month for three consecutive months. Sophomore point guard Matt Santangelo joined him as a unanimous selection to the all-conference team.

Monson was in his tenth season as a coach at Gonzaga; the previous nine were as an assistant under Dan Fitzgerald.

== Roster ==
Source:

== Schedule ==
Source:

== Postseason results ==
Date time, TV	Rank^{#}	Opponent^{#}	Result	Record	Site (attendance) city, state
WCC tournament
Sat, Feb 28; 2:30 pm	(1)	vs. (8) Loyola Marymount; Quarterfinal	W 79–78 ^{OT}	22–8	Toso Pavilion; Santa Clara, California
Sun, Mar 1; 6:00 pm	(1)	vs. (7) San Diego; Semifinal	W 74–59	23–8	Toso Pavilion; Santa Clara, California
Mon, Mar 2; 9:00 pm, ESPN	(1)	vs. (5) San Francisco; Final	L 67–80	23–9	Toso Pavilion; Santa Clara, California
National Invitation tournament
Wed, Mar 11; 6:30 pm		at Wyoming; First round	W 69–55	24–9	Arena-Auditorium (7,412); Laramie, Wyoming
Mon, Mar 16; 9:30 pm, KSKN		at Hawaii; Second round	L 70–78	24–10	Sheriff Center (10,254); Honolulu, Hawaii
*Non-conference game. ^{#}Rankings from AP poll. (#) Tournament seedings in parentheses. All times are in Pacific time.
