= Dan Monson =

American basketball coach (born 1961)

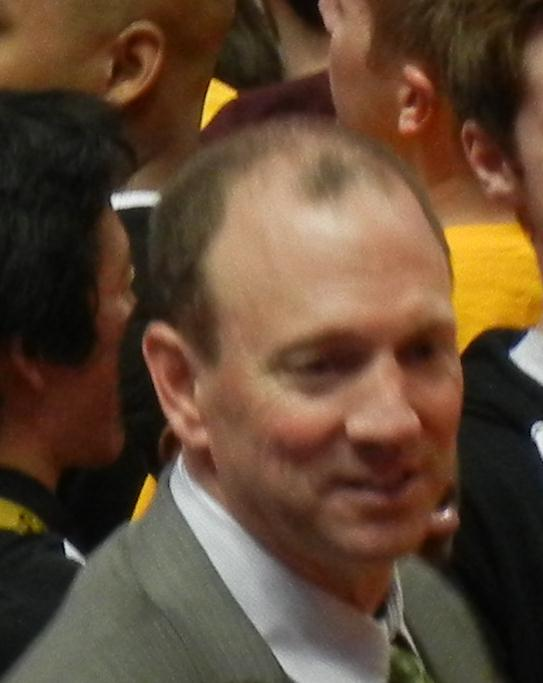
- Monson at the 2012 Big West tournament

Current position
- Title: Head coach
- Team: Eastern Washington
- Conference: Big Sky
- Record: 24–41 (.369)

Biographical details
- Born: October 6, 1961 (age 65); Spokane, Washington, U.S.
- Education: Idaho (1985)

Coaching career (HC unless noted)
- 1986–1988: UAB (assistant)
- 1988–1997: Gonzaga (assistant)
- 1997–1999: Gonzaga
- 1999–2006: Minnesota
- 2007–2024: Long Beach State
- 2024–present: Eastern Washington

Head coaching record
- Overall: 469–436 (.518)
- Tournaments: 3–4 (NCAA Division I); 7–10 (NIT)

Accomplishments and honors

Championships
- WCC tournament (1999); 2 WCC regular season (1998, 1999); 2 Big West tournament (2012, 2024); 4 Big West regular season (2011–2013, 2022)

Awards
- WCC Coach of the Year (1998); 4× Big West Coach of the Year (2011–2013, 2022)

Daniel Lloyd Monson (born October 6, 1961) is an American college basketball coach who is currently the head coach at Eastern Washington. He was previously the head coach at Long Beach State for 17 seasons. He was also the head coach at Minnesota for over seven seasons, reaching postseason play five times. Before coaching the Gophers, he was the head coach at Gonzaga for two seasons, leading the team on an improbable run to the Elite Eight during his last season.

== Early years ==
Monson is the son of college basketball coach Don Monson, and spent most of his early years in eastern Washington, where his father was a successful high school head coach in Cheney and Pasco for 18 seasons. At age 14, the family moved from Pasco to East Lansing, Michigan, where Don was an assistant coach for Jud Heathcote at Michigan State for two seasons.

They moved to Moscow, Idaho, at the start of his junior year, when his father became the head coach of his alma mater, the University of Idaho, in August 1978. He graduated from Moscow High School in 1980 and played college football a few blocks away as a receiver for the Idaho Vandals, then under head coach Jerry Davitch. Monson suffered a knee injury that ended his playing career, and focused on coaching; he graduated from Idaho with a degree in secondary education (mathematics) in 1985.

== Coaching career ==
After graduation, Monson was a high school coach (and math teacher) in Oregon City for a season, then became a collegiate graduate assistant under Gene Bartow at UAB in 1986, where he earned a master's degree in education.

=== Gonzaga ===
Monson began at GU as an assistant coach in 1988 and was elevated to associate head coach under head coach Dan Fitzgerald in 1994; in all, Monson spent eleven years helping build the Gonzaga program. As an assistant, Monson was a key figure in the Bulldogs turnaround during the 1990s. Gonzaga had a record of 223–89 (.715) over ten seasons and he was responsible for recruiting many of the key players in Gonzaga's NCAA Sweet 16 appearances from 1998–2001. From the time Monson was named associate head coach in 1995, Gonzaga averaged 22 wins per season and reached postseason play every year but one. For all of this, Monson was promoted to head coach of the Zags in 1997.

His first year as head coach at Gonzaga (1997–98) resulted in a 24–10 mark, as the Bulldogs won the West Coast Conference championship and advanced to the second round of the NIT. On their way to setting a school-record with its 24 wins, Monson was named the WCC Coach of the Year and National Rookie Coach of the Year by Basketball Times.

The 1999 team brought Gonzaga basketball to national prominence with an impressive run in the NCAA tournament. In the West regional, the tenth-seeded Zags defeated 7th-seed Minnesota and second-seed #7 Stanford in the Seattle sub-regional, then sixth-seed Florida in the Sweet Sixteen round in Phoenix. Gonzaga advanced to the regional final (Elite Eight), taking the region's top seed, eventual national champion Connecticut, down to the last minute, losing by five points.

While at the helm at Gonzaga, Monson had a 52–17 (.754) record in his two seasons and won both regular season titles.

=== Minnesota ===
Monson became one of the more sought-after coaching candidates in college basketball in the spring of 1999. After Gonzaga's improbable run to the Elite Eight, he signed a new contract in mid-April, then was offered the head coaching position at the University of Minnesota in late July, which he accepted. University president Mark Yudof was hoping that Monson would be able to help the program move past the scandals of previous head coach Clem Haskins. In the previous season, Gonzaga had defeated Minnesota in the first round of the NCAA tournament after several Gopher players were forced to sit out due to an academic fraud investigation. Mark Few, Monson's top assistant, succeeded him at Gonzaga. Monson also had ties to Minnesota already, as his father Don was born in rural Menagha.

In April 2002, Monson was courted by the University of Washington in Seattle to coach the Huskies and return to his home state of Washington. Monson initially accepted the offer presented by Huskies AD Barbara Hedges to succeed Bob Bender. The Minnesota athletic department, under Tom Moe, convinced Monson to change his mind and stay on with Minnesota. In the end, Monson decided to return to Minnesota because he didn't feel he had given enough time to the rebuilding effort at Minnesota and hadn't yet attained enough success with the team. Washington ultimately hired Lorenzo Romar.

The Gophers had been docked several scholarships due to the academic scandals of the Haskins era. The reductions took their full effect under Monson's watch, and it was several years before he was able to recruit on equal footing with other Big Ten coaches. He led the Gophers to one NCAA Tournament and 4 NIT appearances in his 7 full seasons as Gophers coach. Nonetheless, he was widely praised for cleaning up the program's image. On November 30, 2006, Monson resigned as head coach of Minnesota after a 2–5 start and only achieving a single 20-win season in seven. Assistant coach Jim Molinari was appointed interim head coach before Tubby Smith was named the new head coach after the season. Monson compiled a 118–106 (.527) record with the Gophers, giving him an overall career record of 170–123 (.580) as a head coach.

=== Long Beach State ===
On April 6, 2007, Monson was named the head coach at Long Beach State. The 49ers (now known as The Beach), improved in each of Monson's first several seasons, to the point that on February 24, 2011, Long Beach defeated Cal Poly 61–55 to clinch their first Big West regular season title since 2006–07 and the #1 seed in the Big West tournament. The following season, Long Beach State won the conference's regular season (15–1) and tournament titles, and advanced to the 2012 NCAA tournament.

Under Monson, The Beach routinely played one of the most difficult non-conference schedules in the nation, usually playing teams such as North Carolina, Duke, Louisville, and Texas as a method to prepare the team for Big West conference play and possibly the NCAA tournament.

Monson has also coached internationally; he was an assistant coach on the 1999 World University Games team and the 2004 USA U-20 team.

In 2018, a poll of Big West assistant coaches named Long Beach State as the "Best Job in the Big West".

The 2021–22 season opener on November 10, 2021 served as a homecoming for Monson, as The Beach traveled to Monson's alma mater of Idaho to play the Vandals in the first regular-season game at Idaho's new home of Idaho Central Credit Union Arena. The Beach won 95–89 in overtime.

On March 11, 2024, the school announced that they would be parting ways with Monson at the end of the season. Six days after the announcement, Long Beach State won the 2024 Big West tournament earning the team an automatic berth to the 2024 NCAA Tournament.

In all, Monson led The Beach to postseason play six times (with two appearances in the NCAA Tournament), won the Big West Conference tournament twice and the regular season title three times and was named Big West Conference Coach of the Year three times.

== Head coaching record ==
Record table
Season	Team	Overall	Conference	Standing	Postseason
Gonzaga Bulldogs (West Coast Conference) (1997–1999)
1997–98	Gonzaga	24–10	10–4	1st	NIT Second Round
1998–99	Gonzaga	28–7	12–2	1st	NCAA Division I Elite Eight
Gonzaga:		52–17 (.754)	22–6 (.786)		
Minnesota Golden Gophers (Big Ten Conference) (1999–2006)
1999–00	Minnesota	12–16	4–12	10th	
2000–01	Minnesota	18–14	5–11	9th	NIT Second Round
2001–02	Minnesota	18–13	9–7	6th	NIT Second Round
2002–03	Minnesota	19–14	8–8	T–6th	NIT Fourth Place
2003–04	Minnesota	12–18	3–13	T–10th	
2004–05	Minnesota	21–11	10–6	T–4th	NCAA Division I Round of 64
2005–06	Minnesota	16–15	5–11	10th	NIT Second Round
2006–07	Minnesota	2–5	0–0		
Minnesota:		118–106 (.527)	44–68 (.393)		
Long Beach State 49ers/Beach (Big West Conference) (2007–2024)
2007–08	Long Beach State	6–25	3–13	8th	
2008–09	Long Beach State	15–15	10–6	2nd	
2009–10	Long Beach State	17–16	8–8	3rd	
2010–11	Long Beach State	22–12	14–2	1st	NIT First Round
2011–12	Long Beach State	25–9	15–1	1st	NCAA Division I Round of 64
2012–13	Long Beach State	19–14	14–4	1st	NIT First Round
2013–14	Long Beach State	15–17	10–6	3rd	
2014–15	Long Beach State	16–17	10–6	4th	
2015–16	Long Beach State	20–15	12–4	3rd	NIT First Round
2016–17	Long Beach State	15–19	9–7	4th	
2017–18	Long Beach State	15–18	9–7	5th	
2018–19	Long Beach State	15–19	8–8	5th	
2019–20	Long Beach State	11–21	6–10	T–7th	
2020–21	Long Beach State	6–12	4–8	10th	
2021–22	Long Beach State	20–13	12–3	1st	NIT First Round
2022–23	Long Beach State	17–16	11–9	7th	
2023–24	Long Beach State	21–15	10–10	T–5th	NCAA Division I Round of 64
Long Beach State:		275–273 (.502)	166–112 (.597)		
Eastern Washington Eagles (Big Sky Conference) (2024–Present)
2024–25	Eastern Washington	10–22	6–12	8th	
2025–26	Eastern Washington	14–19	11–7	3rd	
Eastern Washington:		24–41 (.369)	17–19 (.472)		
Total:		469–437 (.518)			
National champion Postseason invitational champion Conference regular season champion Conference regular season and conference tournament champion Division regular season champion Division regular season and conference tournament champion Conference tournament champion
