= Dick Harter =

American basketball coach

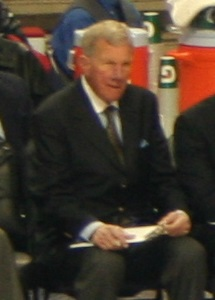
- Harter as an Indiana Pacers assistant in 2009

Personal information
- Born: October 14, 1930 Pottstown, Pennsylvania, U.S.
- Died: March 12, 2012 (aged 81) Hilton Head Island, South Carolina, U.S.

Career information
- High school: The Hill School (Pottstown, Pennsylvania)
- College: Penn (1950–1953)
- Coaching career: 1955–2010

Career history

Coaching
- 1955–1956: Penn (freshmen)
- 1956–1958: Germantown Academy
- 1958–1965: Penn (assistant)
- 1965–1966: Rider
- 1966–1971: Penn
- 1971–1978: Oregon
- 1978–1983: Penn State
- 1983–1986: Detroit Pistons (assistant)
- 1986–1988: Indiana Pacers (assistant)
- 1988–1990: Charlotte Hornets
- 1991–1994: New York Knicks (assistant)
- 1994–1997: Portland Trail Blazers (assistant)
- 1997–2000: Indiana Pacers (assistant)
- 2001–2004: Boston Celtics (assistant)
- 2004–2007: Philadelphia 76ers (assistant)
- 2007–2010: Indiana Pacers (assistant)

Career highlights
- Pac-8 Coach of the Year (1977); 2× Ivy League champion (1970, 1971)

Richard Alvin Harter (October 14, 1930 – March 12, 2012) was an American basketball coach who served as both a head and assistant coach in both the NBA and NCAA.

== Early life ==
Born in Pottstown, Pennsylvania, Harter attended the University of Pennsylvania in Philadelphia, where he played basketball for the Quakers and graduated in 1953. He served two years as an officer in the U.S. Marine Corps, and then was an assistant freshman coach back at Penn for a year. He then coached at Germantown Academy for three years, then back to Penn in 1959 as an assistant coach.

== College head coach ==
Harter left Penn in 1965 to become head coach at Rider University, then returned to Penn as its head coach. After success at Penn, with just one regular season defeat in his final two seasons, Harter was hired in April 1971 at the University of Oregon in Eugene. He succeeded Steve Belko, who stepped down after fifteen years and consecutive 17–9 seasons to become assistant athletic director.

Harter was regarded as one of the top defensive coaches in the 1970s, where his "Kamikaze Kids" at Oregon in the Pac-8 were known for a swarming defense. Many basketball notables came from Harter's Duck program, including Stu Jackson and former Oregon head coach Ernie Kent. After seven seasons in Eugene, Harter left Oregon in 1978, at a salary of $38,000 annually, for Penn State and $41,000, where he stayed for five seasons.

== NBA coach ==
Harter's first job in the NBA was as an assistant coach with the Detroit Pistons in the 1982–83 season. He left in 1986 to become an assistant for the Indiana Pacers. In 1988, he was hired into his first head coaching position, with the expansion Charlotte Hornets; he was the franchise's first ever head coach. In the team's second season Harter was fired in 1990 during mid-season when the Hornets' record was 8–32. Harter went on to be an assistant coach for the New York Knicks under Pat Riley (1991–1994), Portland Trail Blazers under P. J. Carlesimo (1994–1997), Indiana Pacers under Larry Bird (1997–2000), and Boston Celtics under Jim O'Brien. Harter joined the Philadelphia 76ers' coaching staff on May 5, 2004. On June 13, 2007, Harter joined the Indiana Pacers for the third time, as an assistant coach under O'Brien.

== Death ==
Harter died on March 12, 2012, at the age of 81. The cause of death was cancer, said Penn athletic director Steve Bilsky, a co-captain on the 1971 team. Harter died at a hospital at Hilton Head, South Carolina, where he had a residence.

== Head coaching record ==
=== College ===
Record table
Season	Team	Overall	Conference	Standing	Postseason
Rider Broncs (NCAA University Division independent) (1965–1966)
1965–66	Rider	16–9			
Rider:		16–9			
Penn Quakers (Ivy League) (1966–1971)
1966–67	Penn	11–14	7–7	4th	
1967–68	Penn	9–17	4–10	T–6th	
1968–69	Penn	15–10	10–4	3rd	
1969–70	Penn	25–2	14–0	1st	NCAA University Division First Round
1970–71	Penn	28–1	14–0	1st	NCAA University Division Elite Eight
Penn:		88–44	49–21		
Oregon Ducks (Pacific-8 Conference) (1971–1978)
1971–72	Oregon	6–20	0–14	8th	
1972–73	Oregon	16–10	8–6	3rd	
1973–74	Oregon	15–11	9–5	3rd	
1974–75	Oregon	21–9	6–8	T–5th	NIT Third Place
1975–76	Oregon	19–11	10–4	T–2nd	NIT Quarterfinal
1976–77	Oregon	19–10	9–5	2nd	NIT Quarterfinal
1977–78	Oregon	16–11	6–8	T–5th	
Oregon:		112–82	48–50		
Penn State Nittany Lions (Eastern Athletic Association) (1978–1979)
1978–79	Penn State	12–18	4–6	6th	
Penn State Nittany Lions (NCAA Division I independent) (1979–1982)
1979–80	Penn State	18–10			NIT First Round
1980–81	Penn State	17–10			
1981–82	Penn State	15–12			
Penn State Nittany Lions (Atlantic 10 Conference) (1982–1983)
1982–83	Penn State	17–11	9–5	4th	
Penn State:		79–61	13–11		
Total:		295–196			
National champion Postseason invitational champion Conference regular season champion Conference regular season and conference tournament champion Division regular season champion Division regular season and conference tournament champion Conference tournament champion

=== NBA ===
Legend
Regular season	G	Games coached	W	Games won	L	Games lost	W–L %	Win–loss %
Playoffs	PG	Playoff games	PW	Playoff wins	PL	Playoff losses	PW–L %	Playoff win–loss %

Team	Year	G	W	L	W–L%	Finish	PG	PW	PL	PW–L%	Result
Charlotte	1988–89	82	20	62	.244	6th in Atlantic	–	–	–	–	Missed Playoffs
Charlotte	1989–90	40	8	32	.262	(fired)	–	–	–	–	–
Career		122	28	94	.230		–	–	–	–	
