= Ernie Kent =

American basketball player and coach

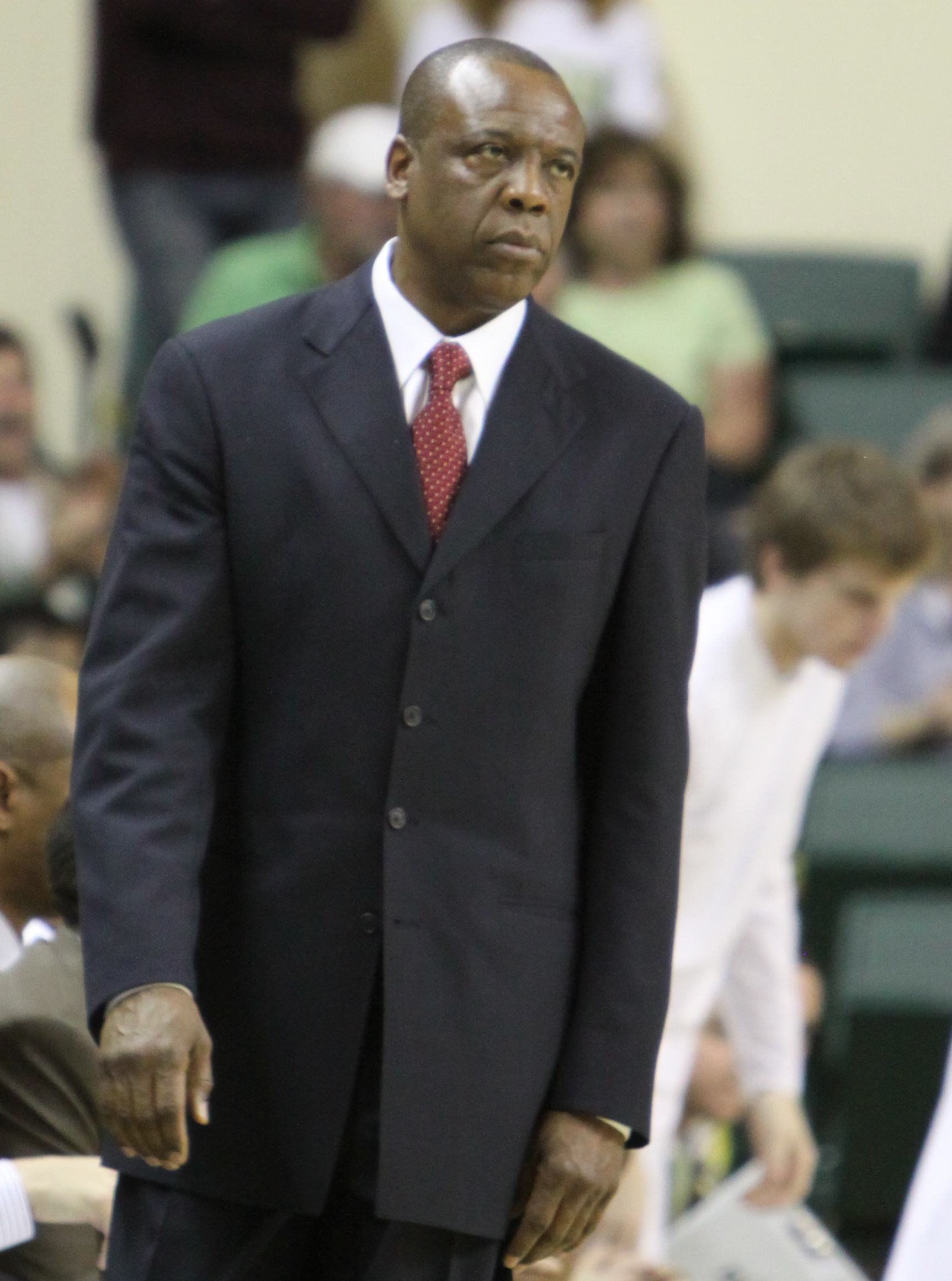
- Kent during an Oregon men's basketball game on March 4, 2010

Biographical details
- Born: January 22, 1955 (age 71); Rockford, Illinois, U.S.

Playing career
- 1973–1977: Oregon
- Position: Forward

Coaching career (HC unless noted)
- 1980–1987: Al-Khaleej
- 1987–1989: Colorado State (assistant)
- 1989–1991: Stanford (assistant)
- 1991–1997: Saint Mary's
- 1997–2010: Oregon
- 2014–2019: Washington State

Head coaching record
- Overall: 383–351 (college)
- Tournaments: 6–6 (NCAA Division I); 6–2 (NIT)

Accomplishments and honors

Championships
- WCC regular season (1997); WCC tournament (1997); Pac-10 regular season (2002); 2 Pac-10 tournament (2003, 2007)

Awards
- Pac-10 Coach of the Year (2002)

Ernest Kent (born January 22, 1955) is an American college basketball coach. He is the former head men's basketball coach at Washington State University. Prior to Washington State, he served as the head men's basketball coach at the University of Oregon and at Saint Mary's (CA). Kent was previously an assistant at Stanford University and also coached abroad in Saudi Arabia. Kent is a college basketball commentator with the Pac-12 Network. Kent grew up in Rockford, Illinois, one of ten children born to Josie and Willie ("WT") Kent. Kent said in a 2014 interview that as a kid he would awaken almost every morning and run to nearby Blackhawk Park hoping to be the first person to shoot a basketball and “see the dew pop off that net.” At Rockford West High School, Kent was heavily recruited by two dozen colleges—not only for basketball, but football and track as well—and chose the University of Oregon.

== Basketball player ==
Kent played for the Oregon Ducks from 1973 to 1977 under head coach Dick Harter. Nicknamed "Million Moves", he was a part of the Kamikaze Kids, known for constant hustle and extremely aggressive play in their attempts to win ball games. Knee injuries ended his collegiate career.

Kent played high school basketball for West High School in Rockford, Illinois. As a Class of 1973 senior, he was named Parade Magazine All-American, Scholastic All-America by Scholastic Magazine, Illinois High School Association (IHSA) All-State, received the American Legion Outstanding Achievement Award, and was a member of the National Honor Society.

== Coaching career ==
=== Early coaching career ===
Between 1980 and 1987, Ernie Kent spent his days in Saudi Arabia coaching basketball for the Al-Khaleej Club. Kent and his wife were immersed in Arab culture, living in a Shiite Muslim village for their first two years, also working for the Arabian American Oil Company in Dhahran. He recalls learning how to be patient, since a translator was required for communication with his team. It was a stressful period of his life and taught him how to deal with extreme pressure.

I worked seven years in Saudi Arabia coaching and my paycheck was on one side of the table and my passport on the other, and they said to me, 'You can't leave and you won't get paid if you don't win.' I think I've handled pressure. I would go to the games and there would be a young Saudi with a submachine gun outside the game. That's pressure. This, this is just basketball.

— Ernie Kent

After returning to the United States from Saudi Arabia, he became an assistant coach at Colorado State University, then at Stanford University under head coach Mike Montgomery. He later went on to become the head coach at Saint Mary's College of California where he remained for six years. While at Saint Mary's, Kent's coaching relationship with the players changed drastically. There he coached now actor Mahershala Ali. His players told Kent that they could not relate to him due to his militaristic style. From that moment on, Kent reversed his stance and became more compassionate toward his players. Before each season began he took his players on a retreat, where his players bonded with each other, strengthening the cohesiveness of the team, a tradition he continued at the University of Oregon.

=== Oregon ===
Kent was hired in 1997 to replace Jerry Green, who was leaving for a position at the University of Tennessee, Kent was the first African American head coach to be hired in the history of the Oregon Ducks athletic department in any sport. Under Kent, the Ducks reached the NCAA tournament five times, in 2000, 2002, 2003, 2007 and 2008, reaching the Elite Eight in 2002 and 2007– Oregon's deepest runs in the tournament in 42 years. He also led the Ducks to the National Invitation Tournament Final Four in 1999 and 2004. In the 2002 season, Kent led the team to its first conference title since 1939 despite the Pacific-10 Conference sending a record of six teams into the NCAA tournament. Under Kent, Oregon was known for playing an up-tempo pace and guard-heavy lineups.

As head coach, Kent was known for his recruiting ability, bringing in a class of highly regarded recruits in 2004 such as Maarty Leunen, Bryce Taylor, Chamberlain Oguchi and Malik Hairston. He was highly criticized for failing to sign two of the highest profile recruits to come from the state of Oregon for the class of 2007, Kyle Singler and Kevin Love. The following year, he signed the #21 recruiting class. During his tenure, he had four players drafted in the first round of the NBA draft in Fred Jones, Luke Ridnour, Luke Jackson and Aaron Brooks.

A decline in the success of his teams between 2004 and 2006, the perceived lack of development of highly regarded recruits as well as rumors of personal issues led many people to question whether Kent would remain at Oregon after the 2005–2006 season. But after the season, the school's athletic director at the time, Bill Moos, issued a statement affirming his support for Kent. The team regained its composure the following year and finished the season within the Elite Eight in the 2007 NCAA tournament. Senior point guard Aaron Brooks said that he felt the team let Kent down the previous season for wanting to play in an up-tempo style but not conditioning for it. After the 2008–2009 season when Kent posted his worst record with Oregon, questions whether Kent would be retained resurfaced. Kent remained the head coach, but following a second-to-last finish in the Pac-10 in the 2009–10 season, Kent was fired. His 235 wins were the most in school history, though he has since been passed by his successor, Dana Altman.

=== Washington State ===
On March 31, 2014, Kent was hired to replace Ken Bone as the Men's Basketball coach at Washington State University. His tenure at Washington State was nowhere near as successful as his tenure at Oregon; in five years, the Cougars never had a winning season and never finished higher than eighth in Pac-12 play.

He was fired later on March 14, 2019, one day after losing to University of Oregon in the first round of the Pac-12 tournament.

== Personal life ==
Ernie Kent was born January 22, 1955, in Rockford, Illinois and has three adult children: Marcus, Jordan and McKenzie. Jordan Kent was a three-sport letterman for the University of Oregon in track & field, basketball and football.

With his degree in community service and public affairs, he was also heavily involved in community service in Eugene, earning the 2004 Hope Award from the Oregon Chapter of the National Multiple Sclerosis Society. Kent is also active with the American Cancer Society and the Coaches Versus Cancer campaign while being the honorary chairman of the Children's Miracle Network.

== Head coaching record ==
Record table
| Season | Team | Overall | Conference | Standing | Postseason |
|---|---|---|---|---|---|
Saint Mary's Gaels (West Coast Conference) (1991–1997)
| 1991–92 | Saint Mary's | 13–17 | 4–10 | 6th | |
| 1992–93 | Saint Mary's | 11–16 | 6–8 | 6th | |
| 1993–94 | Saint Mary's | 13–14 | 5–9 | 7th | |
| 1994–95 | Saint Mary's | 18–10 | 10–4 | T–2nd | |
| 1995–96 | Saint Mary's | 12–15 | 5–9 | 7th | |
| 1996–97 | Saint Mary's | 23–8 | 10–4 | T–1st | NCAA Division I First Round |
| Saint Mary's: | | 90–80 (.529) | 40–44 (.476) | | |
Oregon Ducks (Pacific-10 Conference) (1998–2010)
| 1997–98 | Oregon | 13–14 | 8–10 | T–5th | |
| 1998–99 | Oregon | 19–13 | 8–10 | T–5th | NIT Semifinal |
| 1999–00 | Oregon | 22–8 | 13–5 | 3rd | NCAA Division I First Round |
| 2000–01 | Oregon | 14–14 | 5–13 | T–6th | |
| 2001–02 | Oregon | 26–9 | 14–4 | 1st | NCAA Division I Elite Eight |
| 2002–03 | Oregon | 23–10 | 10–8 | 5th | NCAA Division I First Round |
| 2003–04 | Oregon | 18–13 | 9–9 | T–4th | NIT Semifinal |
| 2004–05 | Oregon | 14–13 | 6–12 | T–8th | |
| 2005–06 | Oregon | 15–18 | 7–11 | T–7th | |
| 2006–07 | Oregon | 29–8 | 11–7 | T–3rd | NCAA Division I Elite Eight |
| 2007–08 | Oregon | 18–14 | 9–9 | T–5th | NCAA Division I First Round |
| 2008–09 | Oregon | 8–23 | 2–16 | 10th | |
| 2009–10 | Oregon | 16–16 | 7–11 | T–8th | |
| Oregon: | | 235–173 (.576) | 109–125 (.466) | | |
Washington State Cougars (Pac-12 Conference) (2014–2019)
| 2014–15 | Washington State | 13–18 | 7–11 | T–8th | |
| 2015–16 | Washington State | 9–22 | 1–17 | 12th | |
| 2016–17 | Washington State | 13–18 | 6–12 | T–10th | |
| 2017–18 | Washington State | 12–19 | 4–14 | 11th | |
| 2018–19 | Washington State | 11–21 | 4–14 | 11th | |
| Washington State: | | 58–98 (.372) | 22–68 (.244) | | |
| Total: | | 383–351 (.522) | | | |
National champion Postseason invitational champion Conference regular season champion Conference regular season and conference tournament champion Division regular season champion Division regular season and conference tournament champion Conference tournament champion
