= Phil Mathews (basketball) =

American basketball coach (born 1950)

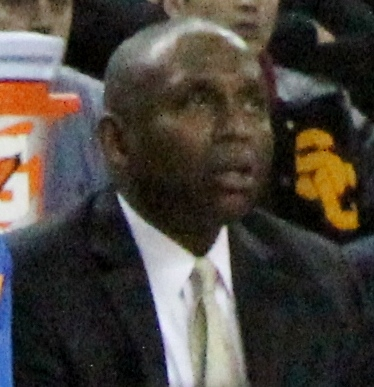
- Mathews in 2011 with UCLA.

Current position
- Title: Head coach
- Team: Riverside City College
- Conference: Orange Empire Conference
- Record: 22–34

Biographical details
- Born: November 27, 1950 (age 75); Riverside, California, U.S.

Playing career
- 1968–1970: Riverside CC
- 1970–1972: UC Irvine
- Position: Guard

Coaching career (HC unless noted)
- 1972–1973: UC Irvine (asst.)
- 1973–1974: Santa Ana Valley HS (JV)
- 1974–1978: UC Irvine (asst.)
- 1978–1981: Santa Ana Valley HS
- 1981–1985: Cal State Fullerton (asst.)
- 1985–1995: Ventura CC
- 1995–2004: San Francisco
- 2004–2006: San Bernardino Valley CC
- 2006–2010: Nebraska (asst.)
- 2010–2013: UCLA (asst.)
- 2013–present: Riverside CC

Administrative career (AD unless noted)
- 1994–1995: Ventura CC

Head coaching record
- Overall: 139–123 (college); 371–107 (junior college)

Accomplishments and honors

Championships
- 2× CCCAA (1987, 1995); Foothill Conference (2005); WCC tournament (1998); 9× Western State Conference North Division (1987–1995); Western State Conference (1986)

Phillip Louis Mathews (born November 27, 1950) is an American basketball coach who is currently head men's basketball coach at Riverside City College. A native of Riverside, California, Mathews played college basketball at Riverside City and UC Irvine.

Since 1972, Mathews has coached at the high school, junior college, and college levels. He began his career as an assistant at UC Irvine, Santa Ana Valley High School, and Cal State Fullerton. From 1985 to 1995, Mathews was a junior college head coach at Ventura and led Ventura to ten conference titles and two state titles. Mathews then was head coach for the University of San Francisco from 1995 to 2004, before returning to the junior college ranks as San Bernardino Valley head coach from 2004 to 2006. Mathews then became an assistant coach at two NCAA programs, Nebraska from 2006 to 2010 and UCLA from 2010 to 2013. Mathews became head coach at Riverside City in 2013.

In the 1998 episode of Teletubbies entitled, "Basketball", Mathews made an appearance with his son, Jordan, as they played basketball on the Sobrato Center court.

== Early life and college playing career ==
Phillip Louis Mathews was born in Riverside, California and graduated from John W. North High School in Riverside in 1968. Mathews then attended Riverside City College for two years and transferred to the University of California, Irvine and lettered two years as a guard on the UC Irvine Anteaters men's basketball team. Mathews graduated from UC Irvine in 1972 with a B.A. in comparative cultures.

== Coaching career ==
Mathews began his coaching career in the 1972–73 season as an assistant at UC Irvine under Tim Tift. He then spent one season as junior varsity coach at Santa Ana Valley High School before returning to UC Irvine for four more seasons as an assistant again under Tift. UC Irvine, then in Division II, made the 1974 NCAA tournament. In 1978, Mathews returned to Santa Ana Valley High to become varsity basketball coach. In three seasons with Mathews as coach, Santa Ana Valley won two Century League titles.

In 1981, Mathews returned to the collegiate ranks in his first NCAA Division I job, as an assistant coach at Cal State Fullerton under George McQuarn. During Mathews's four seasons on staff, Cal State Fullerton made the 1983 National Invitation Tournament.

From 1985 to 1995, Mathews was head coach on the junior college level, at Ventura College. Mathews had a 298–56 record at Ventura, with CCCAA titles in 1987 and 1995. Mathews also served as athletics coordinator at Ventura in the 1994–95 season.

Mathews then was head coach at the University of San Francisco from 1995 to 2004. San Francisco had winning records in 6 of Mathews's nine seasons (including every season from 1995–96 to 1999–00) and made the 1998 NCAA tournament by virtue of winning the WCC tournament. After the 2003–04 season, USF fired Mathews, who finished his tenure with a 139–123 record.

After USF, Mathews returned to the junior college ranks as head coach at San Bernardino Valley College. Mathews led San Bernardino Valley to a 27–5 record in 2004–05 with the Foothill Conference title, then 24–12 in 2005–06. In 2006, Mathews returned to Division I as an assistant coach at Nebraska under Doc Sadler. Mathews remained on staff for four seasons, during which Nebraska made the NIT in 2008 and 2009.

In 2010, Mathews joined Ben Howland's staff at UCLA as an assistant coach. Mathews coached for three seasons, during which UCLA made the NCAA Tournament in 2011 and 2013 and won the Pac-12 regular season title in 2013. Mathews became head coach at Riverside City College in 2013. Riverside went 12–17 in 2013–14, then 10–17 in 2014–15.

== Personal life ==
Mathews's two sons Jordan and Jonah are professional basketball players.

== Head coaching record ==
=== Junior college ===
Record table
Season	Team	Overall	Conference	Standing	Postseason
Ventura Pirates (Western State Conference) (1985–1995)
1985–86	Ventura CC	17–10	8–4	T-1st	CCCAA Regional Finals
1986–87	Ventura CC	31–4	12–1	1st (North)	CCCAA Champions
1987–88	Ventura CC	23–9	11–2	1st (North)	CCCAA Regional Second Round
1988–89	Ventura CC	28–6	12–2	1st (North)	CCCAA Regional Finals
1989–90	Ventura CC	26–10	11–3	1st (North)	CCCAA Regional Second Round
1990–91	Ventura CC	30–5	8–0	1st (North)	CCCAA Regional Finals
1991–92	Ventura CC	33–5	8–0	1st (North)	CCCAA Final Four
1992–93	Ventura CC	37–2	8–0	1st (North)	CCCAA Runner-up
1993–94	Ventura CC	36–3	7–1	1st (North)	CCCAA Runner-up
1994–95	Ventura CC	37–1	9–1	1st (North)	CCCAA Champions
Ventura CC:		298–56	94–14		
San Bernardino Valley Wolverines (Foothill Conference) (2004–2006)
2004–05	San Bernardino Valley CC	27–5	13-1	1st	CCCAA Runner-up
2005–06	San Bernardino Valley CC	24–12	10–4	3rd	
San Bernardino Valley CC:		51–17	23–5		
Riverside City Tigers (Orange Empire Conference) (2013–present)
2013–14	Riverside CC	12–17	6–6	4th	
2014–15	Riverside CC	10–17	5–7	5th	
Riverside CC:		22–34	11–13		
Total:		371–107			
National champion Postseason invitational champion Conference regular season champion Conference regular season and conference tournament champion Division regular season champion Division regular season and conference tournament champion Conference tournament champion

=== College ===
Record table
Season	Team	Overall	Conference	Standing	Postseason
San Francisco Dons (West Coast Conference) (1995–2004)
1995–96	San Francisco	15–12	8–6	4th	
1996–97	San Francisco	16–13	9–5	3rd	
1997–98	San Francisco	19–11	7–7	5th	NCAA Division I First Round
1998–99	San Francisco	12–18	4–10	7th	
1999–00	San Francisco	19–9	7–7	5th	
2000–01	San Francisco	12–18	5–9	5th	
2001–02	San Francisco	13–15	8–6	4th	
2002–03	San Francisco	15–14	9–5	3rd	
2003–04	San Francisco	17–14	7–7	4th	
San Francisco:		138–124	64–62		
Total:		138–124			
National champion Postseason invitational champion Conference regular season champion Conference regular season and conference tournament champion Division regular season champion Division regular season and conference tournament champion Conference tournament champion
