= Kyle Allman Jr. =

Montenegrin-American basketball player (born 1997)

- Allman with Partizan Belgrade in 2026

No. 0 – Partizan Belgrade
- Position: Shooting guard / point guard
- League: Serbian SuperLeague; ABA League; EuroLeague

Personal information
- Born: September 2, 1997 (age 29) Brooklyn, New York, U.S.
- Listed height: 6 ft 3 in (1.91 m)
- Listed weight: 174 lb (79 kg)

Career information
- High school: St. John's Prep (Astoria, New York); Construction Trades (Ozone Park, New York)
- College: Cal State Fullerton (2015–2019)
- NBA draft: 2019: undrafted
- Playing career: 2019–present

Career history
- 2019–2020: Lavrio
- 2020–2021: VEF Rīga
- 2021–2023: Paris Basketball
- 2023: Darüşşafaka
- 2023–2025: Beşiktaş
- 2025–2026: Türk Telekom
- 2026–present: Partizan

Career highlights
- All-EuroCup First Team (2026); Latvian League champion (2021); LBL Playoffs MVP (2021); 2x First-team All-Big West (2018, 2019); Big West tournament MVP (2018)

Kyle Lindsay Allman Jr. (Montenegrin Cyrillic: Кајл Линдси Олман Млађи; born September 2, 1997) is an American-born naturalized Montenegrin professional basketball player for Partizan Belgrade of the Serbian SuperLeague, the ABA League, and the EuroLeague. Listed at 6 feet 3 inches (1.91 m), he plays the point guard position. He played college basketball for the Cal State Fullerton Titans.

== Early life ==
Allman was born and grew up in Brooklyn, New York. He attended St. John's Preparatory School for three years before transferring to the High School for Construction Trades, Engineering and Architecture before his senior year. He averaged 20 points and seven rebounds per game as a senior.

== College career ==
Allman played four seasons for the Cal State Fullerton Titans. He was a key reserve for the team as a true freshman, averaging 5.1 points per game. He became a starter for the Titans as a sophomore and averaged 10.2 points, 2.3 rebounds and 2.1 assists per game. Allman enjoyed a breakout season in his junior year, recording a career-high 19.5 points while also averaging 3.5 rebounds and 2.3 assists per game in 32 games played (30 starts) and was named first team All-Big West Conference. Allman was named the 2018 Big West Conference tournament Most Valuable Player after scoring 26 points, six rebounds, three assists and three steals against UC Irvine in the conference championship game. As a senior, Allman was named first team All-Big West for a second straight season after averaging 17.5 points, three rebounds, and two assists per game. He finished his college career with the most games played in school history with 127 and fifth in points scored with 1,680.

== Professional career ==
=== Lavrio (2019–2020) ===
Allman was added to the Toronto Raptors Summer League roster after going unselected in the 2019 NBA draft, but only appeared in one game and was not offered a contract by the team. Allman signed with Lavrio of the Greek Basket League on July 26, 2019. He averaged 11.1 points, 2.3 rebounds and 2.2 assists per game in his rookie season.

=== VEF Rīga (2020–2021) ===
On July 18, 2020, Allman signed with VEF Rīga of the Latvian–Estonian Basketball League.

=== Paris Basketball (2021–2023) ===
On July 20, 2021, Allman signed with Paris Basketball of the LNB Pro A.

=== Darüşşafaka (2023) ===
On June 29, 2023, Allman signed with Darüşşafaka Lassa of the Basketbol Süper Ligi (BSL).

=== Beşiktaş (2023–2025) ===
Allman with Beşiktaş in 2025

On November 1, 2023, Allman signed with Beşiktaş of the Basketbol Süper Ligi (BSL).

=== Türk Telekom (2025–2026) ===
On July 9, 2025, Allman signed with Türk Telekom of the Turkish Basketbol Süper Ligi (BSL). On March 19, 2026, Allman was named the Most Valuable Player in the Quarterfinals of the 2025-2026 BKT EuroCup. He had 25 points, 4 rebounds and 8 assists.

=== Partizan (2026–present) ===
On July 31, 2026, Allman signed with Partizan Belgrade of the Serbian SuperLeague, the ABA League, and the EuroLeague.

== Career statistics ==
Legend
GP	Games played	GS	Games started	MPG	Minutes per game
FG%	Field goal percentage	3P%	3-point field goal percentage	FT%	Free throw percentage
RPG	Rebounds per game	APG	Assists per game	SPG	Steals per game
BPG	Blocks per game	PPG	Points per game	**Bold**	Career high

=== College ===
Year	Team	GP	GS	MPG	FG%	3P%	FT%	RPG	APG	SPG	BPG	PPG
2015–16	Cal State Fullerton	30	3	18.8	.365	.250	.648	1.6	1.0	.4	.1	5.1
2016–17	Cal State Fullerton	32	26	28.5	.415	.271	.727	2.3	2.1	.7	.3	10.2
2017–18	Cal State Fullerton	32	30	32.9	**.489**	**.429**	.746	**3.5**	**2.3**	**1.1**	.2	**19.5**
2018–19	Cal State Fullerton	**33**	**31**	**35.2**	.414	.349	**.750**	3.0	2.0	.7	**.4**	17.5
Career		127	90	29.1	.434	.352	.730	2.6	1.9	.7	.3	13.2
