= 2017–18 Cal State Northridge Matadors men's basketball team =

American college basketball season

2017–18 Cal State Northridge Matadors men's basketball
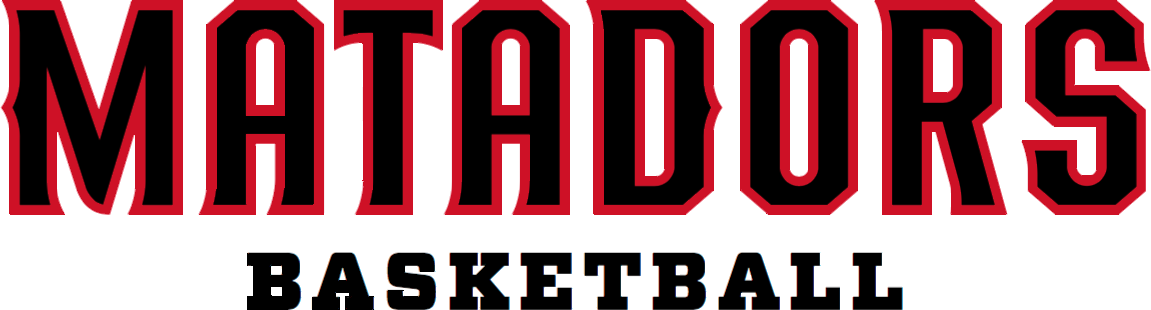
- Conference: Big West Conference
- Record: 6–24 (3–13 Big West)
- Head coach: Reggie Theus (5th season)
- Assistant coaches: Jason Levy; Chris Pompey; Jeff Theiler
- Home arena: Matadome

2017–18 Big West men's basketball standings
	Conf.				Overall
Team	W		L	PCT	W		L	PCT
UC Davis	12	–	4	.750	22	–	11	.667
UC Santa Barbara	11	–	5	.688	23	–	9	.719
UC Irvine	11	–	5	.688	18	–	17	.514
Cal State Fullerton †	10	–	6	.625	20	–	12	.625
Long Beach State	9	–	7	.563	15	–	18	.455
Hawai'i	8	–	8	.500	17	–	13	.567
Cal Poly	4	–	12	.250	9	–	22	.290
UC Riverside	4	–	12	.250	9	–	22	.290
Cal State Northridge	3	–	13	.188	6	–	24	.200
† 2018 Big West tournament winner

The 2017–18 Cal State Northridge Matadors men's basketball team represented California State University, Northridge (also known as CSUN) during the 2017–18 NCAA Division I men's basketball season. The Matadors, led by fifth-year head coach Reggie Theus, played their home games at the Matadome as members of the Big West Conference. They finished season 6–24, and 3–13 in Big West play and finished in last place. They failed to qualify for the Big West tournament.

On March 6, 2018, the school fired head coach Reggie Theus, along with Athletic Director Brandon Martin following a heated verbal exchange between the two following the dismissal of Theus. On March 13, the school hired former NC State coach Mark Gottfried as head coach.

== Previous season ==
The Matadors finished the 2016–17 season 11–19, 7–9 in Big West play to finish in sixth place. In the Big West tournament, they lost to Cal State Fullerton in the quarterfinals.

== Offseason ==
=== Departures ===
Name	Number	Pos.	Height	Weight	Year	Hometown	Reason for departure
Kendall Smith	0	G	6'3"	190	RS Junior	Los Angeles, CA	Transferred to Oklahoma State
Darin Johnson	3	G	6'5"	191	RS Junior	Miami, FL	Pulled out of 2017 NBA draft; failed to meet NCAA deadline. Signed with an agent.
Jason Richardson	10	G	6'2"	210	Sophomore	Hawthorne, CA	Walk-on; transferred
Siyao Sun	12	F	6'10"	245	Freshman	Beijing, China	Walk-On. Did not make roster.
Julian Richardson	13	G	6'3"	201	Junior	Woodland Hills, CA	Walk-On. Did not make roster.
Mehran Nazarian	14	G	6'3"	185	Sophomore	Hawthorne, CA	Walk-On. Did not make roster.
Antonio Bruno	15	G	5'9"	155	Freshman	Youngstown, OH	Walk-On. Did not make roster.
Aaron Parks	22	G	6'3"	210	Senior	Baltimore, MD	Graduated
Jerron Wilbut	23	G	6'3"	180	Junior	Chicago, IL	Transferred to Salem International
Rakim Lubin	25	F	6'8"	257	RS Sophomore	Sacramento, CA	Transferred to LSU–Shreveport
Dylan Johns	45	C	6'11"	240	Junior	Ipswich, England	Left the team for personal reasons

=== Incoming transfers ===
Name	Number	Pos.	Height	Weight	Year	Hometown	Notes
Zeno Lake	10	G	6'8"	215	Sophomore	Compton, CA	Transferred from East Los Angeles College. Junior college transfer. Will have two years of remaining eligibility.
Jonathan Guevara	14	G	6'1"	165	Sophomore	Los Angeles, CA	Transferred from Cerritos College. Junior college transfer. Will have two years of remaining eligibility.
Kobe Paras	21	G	6'6"	200	Freshman	Manila, Philippines	Transferred from Creighton. Under NCAA transfer rules, Paras will have to sit out for the 2017–18 season. Will have three years of remaining eligibility.
Carl Brown	22	G	6'4"	180	Sophomore	Louisville, KY	Transferred from Mt. San Jacinto College. Junior college transfer. Will have two years of remaining eligibility.

=== 2017 recruiting class ===
College recruiting information
Name	Hometown	School	Height	Weight	Commit date
Lamine Diane; F	Dakar, Senegal	Findlay Prep High School	6 ft 7 in (2.01 m)	200 lb (91 kg)	Jul 6, 2017
Lamine Diane; F	Recruit ratings: Scout: Rivals: 247Sports: ESPN: (77)				
Terrell Gomez; G	Los Angeles, CA	Middlebrooks Academy	5 ft 8 in (1.73 m)	160 lb (73 kg)	Nov 17, 2016
Terrell Gomez; G	Recruit ratings: Scout: 247Sports: ESPN: (60)				
Jared Pearre; F	McKinney, TX	McKinney North	6 ft 8 in (2.03 m)	190 lb (86 kg)	Aug 30, 2017
Jared Pearre; F	Recruit ratings: Scout: 247Sports: ESPN: (75)				
Jalon Pipkins; G	Paris, TX	Paris High School	6 ft 4 in (1.93 m)	180 lb (82 kg)	Nov 5, 2017
Jalon Pipkins; G	Recruit ratings: Scout: Rivals: (NR)				
Overall recruit ranking:
Note: In many cases, Scout, Rivals, 247Sports, On3, and ESPN may conflict in their listings of height and weight.; In these cases, the average was taken. ESPN grades are on a 100-point scale.; Sources: "2017 Team Ranking". Rivals.

== Roster ==
2017–18 Cal State Northridge Matadors men's basketball team
Players
Coaches

Pos.	#	Name	Height	Weight	Year	Previous school	Hometown
G	0	Jalon Pipkins	6 ft 4 in (1.93 m)	180 lb (82 kg)	Fr	Paris HS	Paris, TX
G	1	Micheal Warren	6 ft 5 in (1.96 m)	180 lb (82 kg)	Sr	Theodore Roosevelt HS	Washington, D.C.
G	2	Terrell Gomez	5 ft 8 in (1.73 m)	160 lb (73 kg)	Fr	Inglewood HS; Middlebrooks Academy (Post)	Los Angeles, CA
G	3	Lyrik Shreiner	6 ft 3 in (1.91 m)	190 lb (86 kg)	RS So	Hillcrest Academy; TCU	Phoenix, AZ
F	4	Tavrion Dawson	6 ft 8 in (2.03 m)	202 lb (92 kg)	Sr	Gardena Serra HS	Long Beach, CA
C	5	Mahamadou Kaba-Camara	7 ft 0 in (2.13 m)	273 lb (124 kg)	So	Balboa City HS	Conakry, Guinea
F	10	Zeno Lake	6 ft 8 in (2.03 m)	215 lb (98 kg)	Jr	Compton HS; East Los Angeles College	Compton, CA
F	11	Lamine Diane (redshirt)	6 ft 7 in (2.01 m)	200 lb (91 kg)	Fr	Findlay Prep	Dakar, Senegal
G	12	Alex Sokol (W)	6 ft 5 in (1.96 m)	175 lb (79 kg)	Fr	Valley Christian HS	San Jose, CA
G	13	Mason Johnson (W)	6 ft 2 in (1.88 m)	185 lb (84 kg)	Fr	Oxnard HS	Oxnard, CA
G	14	Jonathan Guevara	6 ft 1 in (1.85 m)	165 lb (75 kg)	Jr	Fairfax HS; Cerritos College	Los Angeles, CA
G	21	Kobe Paras (I) (redshirt)	6 ft 6 in (1.98 m)	200 lb (91 kg)	RS So	Middlebrooks Academy; Creighton	Manila, Philippines
G	22	Carl Brown	6 ft 4 in (1.93 m)	180 lb (82 kg)	Jr	Western HS; Mt. San Jacinto College	Louisville, KY
F	24	Reggie Theus, Jr.	6 ft 6 in (1.98 m)	217 lb (98 kg)	RS Sr	Fairfax HS; South Carolina	Los Angeles, CA
F	30	Anthony Swan	6 ft 7 in (2.01 m)	196 lb (89 kg)	RS Jr	Virginia Episcopal School; George Washington	Los Angeles, CA
F	34	Jared Pearre	6 ft 8 in (2.03 m)	190 lb (86 kg)	Fr	McKinney North	McKinney, TX
C	42	Blair Orr	6 ft 8 in (2.03 m)	252 lb (114 kg)	RS Jr	El Camino Real HS; Winnipeg	Camarillo, CA

Head coach

- Reggie Theus (UNLV)

Assistant coach(es)

- Jason Levy (Cal State Northridge)
- Chris Pompey (Pittsburgh)
- Jeff Theiler (La Verne)

Legend

- (C) Team captain
- (S) Suspended
- (I) Ineligible
- (W) Walk-on
- Injured
- Current redshirt

Roster

== Schedule and results ==
Date time, TV	Opponent	Result	Record	Site (attendance) city, state
Non-conference regular season
Nov 10, 2017*; 7:30 pm	Life Pacific	W 76–50	1–0	Matadome (1,232); Northridge, CA
Nov 13, 2017*; 7:00 pm	at Fresno State; Cancún Challenge campus game	L 73–89	1–1	Save Mart Center (4,864); Fresno, CA
Nov 18, 2017*; 3:00 pm	at George Mason; Cancún Challenge campus game	L 73–78 ^{OT}	1–2	EagleBank Arena (3,041); Fairfax, VA
Nov 21, 2017*; 12:00 pm	vs. Southeast Missouri State; Cancún Challenge Mayan Division	L 59–74	1–3	Hard Rock Hotel Riviera Convention Center; Cancún, Mexico
Nov 22, 2017*; 12:30 pm	vs. Binghamton; Cancún Challenge Mayan Division	L 65–70	1–4	Hard Rock Hotel Riviera Convention Center; Cancún, Mexico
Nov 28, 2017*; 7:00 pm, P12N	at California	L 63–83	1–5	Haas Pavilion (6,177); Berkeley, CA
Dec 3, 2017*; 6:00 pm	at Montana	L 68–86	1–6	Dahlberg Arena (2,734); Missoula, MT
Dec 6, 2017*; 6:00 pm	at Idaho State	L 66–74	1–7	Holt Arena (1,300); Pocatello, ID
Dec 9, 2017*; 7:00 pm	Loyola Marymount	L 57–74	1–8	Matadome (745); Northridge, CA
Dec 17, 2017*; 2:00 pm	at Eastern Washington	L 58–86	1–9	Reese Court (1,279); Cheney, WA
Dec 19, 2017*; 7:00 pm	at Sacramento State	L 61–66	1–10	Hornets Nest (538); Sacramento, CA
Dec 23, 2017*; 3:00 pm	Idaho State	L 55–67	1–11	Matadome (476); Northridge, CA
Dec 27, 2017*; 7:00 pm	San Diego Christian	W 93–63	2–11	Matadome (276); Northridge, CA
Dec 30, 2017*; 7:00 pm	Morgan State	W 79–69	3–11	Matadome (479); Northridge, CA
Big West regular season
Jan 6, 2018; 7:00 pm, ESPN3	Hawaii	L 46–65	3–12 (0–1)	Matadome (686); Northridge, CA
Jan 10, 2018; 7:30 pm, FS West	at Long Beach State	L 70–80	3–13 (0–2)	Walter Pyramid (2,315); Long Beach, CA
Jan 13, 2018; 7:00 pm	UC Irvine	L 54–71	3–14 (0–3)	Matadome (559); Northridge, CA
Jan 17, 2018; 7:00 pm, ESPN3	at UC Riverside	W 66–57	4–14 (1–3)	Student Recreation Center Arena (507); Riverside, CA
Jan 20, 2018; 4:00 pm, ESPN3	Cal Poly	W 72–54	5–14 (2–3)	Matadome (828); Northridge, CA
Jan 25, 2018; 7:00 pm	at UC Davis	L 56–63	5–15 (2–4)	The Pavilion (1,075); Davis, CA
Jan 27, 2018; 7:00 pm	Long Beach State	L 66–70	5–16 (2–5)	Matadome (1,207); Northridge, CA
Feb 1, 2018; 7:00 pm, ESPN3	UC Davis	L 56–63	5–17 (2–6)	Matadome (1,006); Northridge, CA
Feb 3, 2018; 7:00 pm	at UC Santa Barbara	L 51–75	5–18 (2–7)	The Thunderdome (2,229); Santa Barbara, CA
Feb 7, 2018; 7:00 pm, ESPN3	at UC Irvine	L 56–77	5–19 (2–8)	Bren Events Center (1,198); Irvine, CA
Feb 10, 2018; 9:00 pm	at Hawaii	W 77–71	6–19 (3–8)	Stan Sheriff Center (5,945); Honolulu, HI
Feb 14, 2018; 7:00 pm, ESPN3	UC Riverside	L 62–69	6–20 (3–9)	Matadome (615); Northridge, CA
Feb 17, 2018; 6:00 pm, ESPN3	at Cal State Fullerton	L 70–88	6–21 (3–10)	Titan Gym (786); Fullerton, CA
Feb 22, 2018; 7:00 pm	at Cal Poly	L 86–90 ^{2OT}	6–22 (3–11)	Mott Athletic Center (1,250); San Luis Obispo, CA
Feb 24, 2018; 7:00 pm, ESPN3	UC Santa Barbara	L 73–82	6–23 (3–12)	Matadome (1,122); Northridge, CA
Feb 28, 2018; 7:00 pm, ESPN3	Cal State Fullerton	L 76–102	6–24 (3–13)	Matadome (761); Northridge, CA
*Non-conference game. ^{#}Rankings from AP Poll. (#) Tournament seedings in parentheses. All times are in Pacific Time.
