= 2018 Big West Conference men's basketball tournament =

- Classification: Division I
- Season: 2017–18
- Teams: 8
- Site: Honda Center; Anaheim, California
- Champions: Cal State Fullerton (3rd title)
- Winning coach: Dedrique Taylor (1st title)
- MVP: Kyle Allman (Cal State Fullerton)
- Television: Prime Ticket; ESPNU; ESPN2

2017–18 Big West men's basketball standings
	Conf.				Overall
Team	W		L	PCT	W		L	PCT
UC Davis	12	–	4	.750	22	–	11	.667
UC Santa Barbara	11	–	5	.688	23	–	9	.719
UC Irvine	11	–	5	.688	18	–	17	.514
Cal State Fullerton †	10	–	6	.625	20	–	12	.625
Long Beach State	9	–	7	.563	15	–	18	.455
Hawai'i	8	–	8	.500	17	–	13	.567
Cal Poly	4	–	12	.250	9	–	22	.290
UC Riverside	4	–	12	.250	9	–	22	.290
Cal State Northridge	3	–	13	.188	6	–	24	.200
† 2018 Big West tournament winner

The 2018 Big West Conference men's basketball tournament was the postseason men's basketball tournament for the Big West Conference of the 2017–18 NCAA Division I men's basketball season. It was held from March 8–10, 2018 at the Honda Center in Anaheim, California. No. 4 seed Cal State Fullerton defeated No. 3 seed UC Irvine in the championship game to win the tournament and receive the conference's automatic bid to the NCAA tournament.

== Seeds ==
The top eight conference teams were eligible for the tournament. Teams were seeded by record within the conference, with a tiebreaker system to seed teams with identical conference records. Teams were re-seeded after the quarterfinals.

Seed	School	Conference	Tiebreaker
1	UC Davis	12–4	
2	UC Santa Barbara	11–5	1–1 vs UC Davis
3	UC Irvine	11–5	0–2 vs UC Davis
4	Cal State Fullerton	10–6	
5	Long Beach State	9–7	
6	Hawaii	8–8	
7	Cal Poly	4–12	1–1 vs UC Santa Barbara
8	UC Riverside	4–12	0–2 vs UC Santa Barbara

== Schedule and results ==
Game	Time	Matchup	Score	Television
Quarterfinals – Thursday, March 8
1	12:00 pm	No. 1 UC Davis vs No. 8 UC Riverside	70–66	Fox Sports West/Prime Ticket
2	2:30 pm	No. 4 Cal State Fullerton vs No. 5 Long Beach State	76–74	Fox Sports West/Prime Ticket
3	6:00 pm	No. 3 UC Irvine vs No. 6 Hawaii	68–67	Fox Sports West/Prime Ticket
4	8:30 pm	No. 2 UC Santa Barbara vs No. 7 Cal Poly	75–53	Fox Sports West/Prime Ticket
Semifinals – Friday, March 9
5	6:30 pm	No. 1 UC Davis vs No. 4 Cal State Fullerton	52–55	ESPNU
6	9:00 pm	No. 3 UC Irvine vs No. 2 UC Santa Barbara	61–58	ESPNU
Championship – Saturday, March 10
7	9:00 pm	No. 3 UC Irvine vs No. 4 Cal State Fullerton	55–71	ESPN2
Game times in PT. Rankings denote tournament seeding. All games held at Honda Center, Anaheim, California

== Bracket ==
Quarterfinals; Thursday, March 8 FS West and FS Prime Ticket
1	UC Davis	70
8	UC Riverside	66
4	Cal State Fullerton	76
5	Long Beach State	74
(Pairings are reseeded after the first round)
2	UC Santa Barbara	75
7	Cal Poly	53
3	UC Irvine	68
6	Hawaii	67

Semifinals; Friday, March 9 ESPNU (re-seeded)
1	UC Davis	52
4	Cal State Fullerton	55
2	UC Santa Barbara	58
3	UC Irvine	61

Championship; Saturday, March 10; ESPN2
4	Cal State Fullerton	71
3	UC Irvine	55
