= 2017–18 Cal State Fullerton Titans men's basketball team =

American college basketball season

2017–18 Cal State Fullerton Titans men's basketball

Big West tournament champions

NCAA tournament, first round
- Conference: Big West Conference
- Record: 20–12 (10–6 Big West)
- Head coach: Dedrique Taylor (5th season)
- Assistant coaches: John Smith; Danny Sprinkle; Anthony Santos
- Home arena: Titan Gym (Capacity: 4,000)

2017–18 Big West men's basketball standings
	Conf.				Overall
Team	W		L	PCT	W		L	PCT
UC Davis	12	–	4	.750	22	–	11	.667
UC Santa Barbara	11	–	5	.688	23	–	9	.719
UC Irvine	11	–	5	.688	18	–	17	.514
Cal State Fullerton †	10	–	6	.625	20	–	12	.625
Long Beach State	9	–	7	.563	15	–	18	.455
Hawai'i	8	–	8	.500	17	–	13	.567
Cal Poly	4	–	12	.250	9	–	22	.290
UC Riverside	4	–	12	.250	9	–	22	.290
Cal State Northridge	3	–	13	.188	6	–	24	.200
† 2018 Big West tournament winner

The 2017–18 Cal State Fullerton Titans men's basketball team represented California State University, Fullerton during the 2017–18 NCAA Division I men's basketball season. The Titans, led by fifth-year head coach Dedrique Taylor, played their home games at the Titan Gym, in Fullerton, California as members of the Big West Conference. They finished the season 20–12, 10–6 in Big West play, to finish in fourth place. They defeated Long Beach State and UC Davis to advance to the championship game of the Big West tournament. In the championship, they defeated UC Irvine to win the tournament and receive the conference's automatic bid to the NCAA tournament. As the No. 15 seed in the East region, they lost to Purdue in the first round.

== Previous season ==
The Titans finished the 2016–17 season 17–15, 10–6 in Big West play, to finish in third place. In the Big West tournament, they defeated Cal State Northridge in the quarterfinals before losing to UC Davis in the semifinals. They were then invited to the CollegeInsider.com Tournament, where they lost to Weber State in the first round.

== Offseason ==
=== Departures ===
Name	Number	Pos.	Height	Weight	Year	Hometown	Reason for departure
Tre Coggins	1	G	6' 3"	193	Senior	San Juan Capistrano, CA	Graduated
Lionheart Leslie	2	G	5' 10"	179	Senior	Houma, LA	Graduated
Loren Brill	11	G	6' 0"	180	Freshman	Gaithersburg, MD	Walk-on; transferred to Old Dominion
Richard Peters	22	C	6' 11"	270	Senior	Pickering, ON	Graduated
Joshua Currenton	32	C	6' 10"	250	Junior	Watts, CA	Walk-on; left the team for personal reasons
Darcy Malone	33	C	7'0"	244	Senior	Canberra, Australia	Graduated
Riley Dearring	35	G	6' 5"	180	RS Junior	Minnetonka, MN	Left the team for personal reasons
Jhan Paul Mejia	41	F	6' 10"	195	Junior	Madrid, Spain	Graduate transferred to College of Charleston

=== Incoming transfers ===
Name	Number	Pos.	Height	Weight	Year	Hometown	Previous school
Dominik Heinzl	21	F	6' 7"	200	Junior	Uzov, Czech Republic	Junior college transferred from Laramie County CC

=== 2017 incoming recruits ===
College recruiting
Name	Hometown	School	Height	Weight	Commit date
Landon Kirkwood; SG	Brooklyn Center, MN	Brooklyn Center High School	6 ft 3 in (1.91 m)	185 lb (84 kg)	Dec 16, 2015
Landon Kirkwood; SG	Recruit ratings: Scout: Rivals: (NR)				
Daniel Venzant; PG	Midland, TX	Midland Christian School	5 ft 9 in (1.75 m)	170 lb (77 kg)	
Daniel Venzant; PG	Recruit ratings: Scout: Rivals: (NR)				
Josh Pitts; PF	San Antonio, TX	Memorial High School	6 ft 8 in (2.03 m)	230 lb (100 kg)	
Josh Pitts; PF	Recruit ratings: Scout: Rivals: (NR)				
Gaber Ozegovic; PF	Kranj, Slovenia	Primorska	6 ft 6 in (1.98 m)	195 lb (88 kg)	
Gaber Ozegovic; PF	Recruit ratings: Scout: Rivals: (NR)				
Johnny Wang; PF	Beijing, China	Santa Margarita Catholic High School	6 ft 9 in (2.06 m)	240 lb (110 kg)	
Johnny Wang; PF	Recruit ratings: Scout: Rivals: (NR)				
Overall recruit ranking:
Note: In many cases, Scout, Rivals, 247Sports, On3, and ESPN may conflict in their listings of height and weight.; In these cases, the average was taken. ESPN grades are on a 100-point scale.; Sources: "2017 Team Ranking". Rivals.

=== 2018 incoming recruits ===
College recruiting (2018)
Name	Hometown	School	Height	Weight	Commit date
Wayne Arnold #55 SG	Compton, CA	Dominguez High School	6 ft 3 in (1.91 m)	165 lb (75 kg)	Aug 21, 2017
Wayne Arnold #55 SG	Recruit ratings: Scout: Rivals: (75)				
Overall recruit ranking:
Note: In many cases, Scout, Rivals, 247Sports, On3, and ESPN may conflict in their listings of height and weight.; In these cases, the average was taken. ESPN grades are on a 100-point scale.; Sources: "2018 Team Ranking". Rivals.

== Roster ==
2017–18 Cal State Fullerton Titans men's basketball team
Players
Coaches

Pos.	#	Name	Height	Weight	Year	Previous school	Hometown
G	0	Kyle Allman Jr.	6 ft 3 in (1.91 m)	175 lb (79 kg)	Jr	HSCTEA	Brooklyn, NY
G	1	Jamal Smith (W)	6 ft 3 in (1.91 m)	165 lb (75 kg)	RS So	Rancho Verde High School	Moreno Valley, CA
G	2	Daniel Venzant	5 ft 9 in (1.75 m)	170 lb (77 kg)	Fr	Midland High School	Midland, TX
G	3	Dwight Ramos	6 ft 5 in (1.96 m)	190 lb (86 kg)	So	Walnut High School	West Covina, CA
F	5	Davon Clare	6 ft 5 in (1.96 m)	205 lb (93 kg)	So	Harker Heights High School	Killeen, TX
G	10	Austen Awosika	6 ft 3 in (1.91 m)	195 lb (88 kg)	So	Ayala High School	Chino Hills, CA
G	11	Ian Fox (W)	6 ft 0 in (1.83 m)	175 lb (79 kg)	Jr	Idaho State University	Redondo Beach, CA
G	12	Landon Kirkwood	6 ft 4 in (1.93 m)	185 lb (84 kg)	Fr	Brooklyn Center High School	Brooklyn Park, MN
F	13	Arkim Robertson	6 ft 9 in (2.06 m)	230 lb (104 kg)	Sr	Western Oklahoma State College	Saint John Parish, Grenada
G	14	Khalil Ahmad	6 ft 4 in (1.93 m)	185 lb (84 kg)	Jr	Centennial High School	Corona, CA
G	15	Jose Garcia-Gonzalez (W)	6 ft 3 in (1.91 m)	185 lb (84 kg)	RS Fr	Los Alamitos High School	Los Alamitos, CA
F	21	Dominik Heinzl	6 ft 7 in (2.01 m)	200 lb (91 kg)	Jr	Laramie County Community College	Prague, Czech Republic
F	23	Gaber Ozegovic	6 ft 6 in (1.98 m)	195 lb (88 kg)	Fr	Gimnazija Koper	Kranj, Slovenia
F	24	Josh Pitts	6 ft 10 in (2.08 m)	245 lb (111 kg)	Fr	Memorial High School	San Antonio, TX
F	33	Johnny Wang	6 ft 9 in (2.06 m)	240 lb (109 kg)	Fr	Santa Margarita Catholic High School	Beijing, China
F	34	Jackson Rowe	6 ft 7 in (2.01 m)	210 lb (95 kg)	Fr	Wasatch Academy	Toronto, ON

Head coach

- Dedrique Taylor (UC Davis)

Assistant coach(es)

- John Smith (Dominican (CA))
- Danny Sprinkle (Montana State)
- Anthony Santos (Cal State Fullerton)

Legend

- (C) Team captain
- (S) Suspended
- (I) Ineligible
- (W) Walk-on
- Injured
- Current redshirt

Roster
Last update: August 7, 2024

== Schedule and results ==
Date time, TV	Rank^{#}	Opponent^{#}	Result	Record	High points	High rebounds	High assists	Site (attendance) city, state
Exhibition
November 4, 2017*; 6:00 p.m.		La Verne	W 112–57		13 – Kirkwood	6 – Pitts	5 – Venzant	Titan Gym (662); Fullerton, CA
Non-conference regular season
November 10, 2017*; 7:00 p.m., P12N		at No. 10 USC	L 42–84	0–1	12 – Rowe	8 – Rowe	1 – Ahmad	Galen Center (6,327); Los Angeles, CA
November 15, 2017*; 7:00 p.m.		at No. 21 Saint Mary's	L 57–76	0–2	13 – Rowe	6 – Awosika	4 – Awosika	McKeon Pavilion (2,769); Moraga, CA
November 18, 2017*; 2:00 p.m.		Bethesda	W 77–35	1–2	12 – Robertson	9 – Awosika	6 – Allman	Titan Gym (624); Fullerton, CA
November 23, 2017*; 7:30 p.m., ESPNN		Georgia; Wooden Legacy	L 57–64	1–3	34 – Allman	4 – Rowe	2 – Allman	Titan Gym (2,131); Fullerton, CA
November 24, 2018*; 6:30 p.m., ESPN3		Sacramento State; Wooden Legacy	W 68–63	2–3	25 – Ahmad	7 – Rowe	5 – Awosika	Titan Gym (2,513); Fullerton, CA
November 26, 2017*; 6:30 p.m., ESPN3		Harvard; Wooden Legacy	W 70–61	3–3	25 – Rowe	5 – Rowe	6 – Awosika	Titan Gym (1,733); Fullerton, CA
December 2, 2017*; 6:00 p.m.		Cal Lutheran	W 86–58	4–3	22 – Allman	7 – Robertson	5 – Smith	Titan Gym (2,085); Fullerton, CA
December 6, 2017*; 7:00 p.m.		at Portland	W 76–66	5–3	24 – Ahmad	8 – Rowe	3 – Awosika	Chiles Center (1,294); Portland, OR
December 9, 2017*; 6:00 p.m.		Utah Valley	W 91–83	6–3	34 – Ahmad	10 – Robertson	5 – Awosika	Titan Gym (914); Fullerton, CA
December 16, 2017*; 1:00 p.m., P12N		at California	L 89–95 ^{OT}	6–4	30 – Allman	12 – Rowe	7 – Smith	Haas Pavilion (6,758); Berkeley, CA
December 22, 2017*; 7:00 p.m.		at Loyola Marymount	W 88–80	7–4	25 – Ahmad	13 – Robertson	8 – Allman	Gersten Pavilion (933); Los Angeles, CA
December 30, 2017*; 5:00 p.m.		at Utah Valley	L 78–87	7–5	18 – Ahmad	7 – Allman	2 – Ahmad	UCCU Center (3,158); Orem, UT
Big West regular season
January 3, 2018; 7:00 p.m., ESPN3		UC Riverside	W 68–65	8–5 (1–0)	16 – Allman	6 – Allman	5 – Smith	Titan Gym (878); Fullerton, CA
January 6, 2018; 7:00 p.m.		at Cal Poly	W 101–97 ^{OT}	9–5 (2–0)	30 – Allman	12 – Rowe	5 – Awosika	Mott Athletics Center (2,513); San Luis Obispo, CA
January 11, 2018; 7:30 p.m., FSN		at UC Irvine	W 67–64	10–5 (3–0)	14 – Rowe	8 – Rowe	3 – Rowe	Bren Events Center (1,484); Irvine, CA
January 13, 2018; 6:00 p.m., ESPN3		UC Davis	W 85–70	11–5 (4–0)	27 – Allman	7 – Ahmad	4 – Allman	Titan Gym (1,267); Fullerton, CA
January 17, 2018; 7:00 p.m.		at UC Santa Barbara	L 64–83	11–6 (4–1)	19 – Ahmad	5 – Robertson	5 – Allman	The Thunderdome (1,714); Santa Barbara, CA
January 20, 2018; 7:30 p.m., FSN		at Long Beach State	L 73–81	11–7 (4–2)	16 – Ahmad	8 – Ahmad	2 – Awosika	Walter Pyramid (3,037); Long Beach, CA
January 25, 2018; 7:30 p.m., FSN		UC Santa Barbara	L 65–70	11–8 (4–3)	24 – Allman	7 – Ahmad	5 – Rowe	Titan Gym (1,033); Fullerton, CA
January 28, 2018; 10:00 p.m.		at Hawaii	W 69–66	12–8 (5–3)	40 – Allman	6 – Rowe	4 – Allman	Stan Sheriff Center (6,869); Honolulu, HI
February 3, 2018; 7:00 p.m., ESPNU		UC Irvine	L 58–63	12–9 (5–4)	20 – Allman	11 – Rowe	3 – Ahmad	Titan Gym (1,506); Fullerton, CA
February 8, 2018; 7:00 p.m., ESPN3		Cal Poly	W 75–59	13–9 (6–4)	22 – Ahmad	10 – Rowe	5 – Awosika	Titan Gym (1,069); Fullerton, CA
February 10, 2018; 5:00 p.m.		at UC Davis	W 68–66	14–9 (7–4)	31 – Ahmad	8 – Allman	2 – Ahmad	The Pavilion (3,031); Davis, CA
February 17, 2018; 6:00 p.m., ESPN3		Cal State Northridge	W 88–70	15–9 (8–4)	29 – Ahmad	9 – Rowe	8 – Rowe	Titan Gym (786); Fullerton, CA
February 21, 2018; 7:00 p.m., ESPN3		at UC Riverside	L 65–69	15–10 (8–5)	20 – Allman	11 – Rowe	2 – Allman	SRC Arena (582); Riverside, CA
February 24, 2018; 7:00 p.m., ESPN2		Long Beach State	W 81–71	16–10 (9–5)	25 – Allman	6 – Clare	7 – Ahmad	Titan Gym (1,653); Fullerton, CA
February 28, 2018; 7:00 p.m., ESPN3		at Cal State Northridge	W 102–76	17–10 (10–5)	23 – Allman	8 – Robertson	4 – Awosika	Matadome (761); Los Angeles, CA
March 3, 2018; 3:00 p.m., FSN		Hawaii	L 60–68	17–11 (10–6)	18 – Allman	5 – Rowe	2 – Allman	Titan Gym (972); Fullerton, CA
Big West tournament
March 8, 2018; 2:30 p.m., FSN	(4)	vs. (5) Long Beach State; Quarterfinals	W 76–74	18–11	24 – Allman	8 – Rowe	8 – Allman	Honda Center (3,311); Anaheim, CA
March 9, 2018; 6:30 p.m., ESPN3	(4)	vs. (1) UC Davis; Semifinals	W 55–52	19–11	16 – Rowe	11 – Rowe	5 – Awosika	Honda Center (3,984); Anaheim, CA
March 10, 2018; 8:59 p.m., ESPN2	(4)	vs. (2) UC Irvine; Championship	W 71–55	20–11	26 – Allman	7 – Clare	4 – Smith	Honda Center (5,664); Anaheim, CA
NCAA tournament
March 16, 2018*; 9:40 a.m., truTV	(15 E)	vs. (2 E) No. 11 Purdue; First round	L 48–74	20–12	21 – Allman	5 – Allman	2 – Allman	Little Caesars Arena (20,163); Detroit, MI
*Non-conference game. ^{#}Rankings from AP poll. (#) Tournament seedings in parentheses. E=East. All times are in Pacific.

Source: – All home or Big West matches were televised on BigWest.TV.

== Player statistics ==
Individual player statistics (Final)
			Minutes		Scoring		Total FGs			3-point FGs			Free-throws			Rebounds							
Player	GP	GS	Tot	Avg	Pts	Avg	FG	FGA	Pct	3FG	3FA	Pct	FT	FTA	Pct	Off	Def	Tot	Avg	A	Stl	Blk	TO
Ahmad, Khalil	32	30	1002	31.3	484	15.1	170	407	.418	57	178	.320	87	105	.829	17	104	121	3.8	52	39	7	78
Allman, Kyle	32	30	1053	32.9	623	19.5	198	405	.489	45	105	.429	182	244	.746	11	100	111	3.5	75	36	6	74
Awosika, Austen	32	14	873	27.3	229	7.2	79	193	.409	7	34	.206	64	97	.660	18	97	115	3.6	85	32	7	56
Clare, Davon	32	3	554	17.3	106	3.3	40	95	.421	7	28	.250	19	27	.704	31	78	109	1.1	35	15	11	37
Fox, Ian	5	0	38	7.6	6	1.2	2	14	.143	2	11	.182	0	0	0	4	0	4	0.8	4	2	1	1
García, José	1	0	4	4.0	4	4.0	2	7	.286	0	2	.000	0	0	0	4	1	5	5.0	0	1	0	0
Heinzl, Dominik	30	5	303	10.1	71	2.4	29	51	.569	0	0	0	13	18	.722	15	36	51	1.7	4	6	5	21
Kirkwood, Landon	11	0	51	4.6	17	1.5	7	13	.538	3	7	.429	0	0	0	3	4	7	0.6	3	2	0	2
Pitts, Josh	19	0	92	4.8	22	1.2	9	26	.346	0	0	0	4	8	.500	11	12	23	1.2	3	2	2	5
Ramos, Dwight	18	1	121	6.7	37	2.1	14	46	.304	5	23	.217	4	8	.500	9	9	18	1.0	9	4	0	11
Robertson, Arkim	32	27	496	15.5	167	5.2	63	98	.643	0	0	0	41	63	.651	53	85	138	4.3	7	11	28	31
Rowe, Jackson	31	31	929	30.0	376	12.1	136	234	.581	24	58	.414	80	103	.777	42	166	208	6.7	50	29	31	64
Smith, Jamal	32	18	721	22.5	125	3.9	35	84	.417	13	35	.371	42	56	.750	6	75	81	2.5	61	18	6	52
Venzant, Daniel	24	1	138	5.8	41	1.7	17	35	.486	3	12	.250	4	11	.364	0	14	14	0.6	12	3	0	9
Wang, Johnny	15	0	75	5.0	10	0.7	3	13	.231	1	7	.143	3	5	.600	2	16	18	1.2	3	1	2	4
Total	32	–	6450	201.6	2318	72.4	804	1721	.467	167	500	.334	543	745	.729	276	847	1123	35.1	403	201	106	455
Opponents	32	–	6450	201.6	2245	70.2	768	1861	.413	220	635	.346	489	647	.756	320	754	1074	33.6	396	180	114	413

Legend
GP	Games played	GS	Games started	Avg	Average per game
FG	Field-goals made	FGA	Field-goal attempts	Off	Offensive rebounds
Def	Defensive rebounds	A	Assists	TO	Turnovers
Blk	Blocks	Stl	Steals	High	Team high
