= 2017–18 Cal Poly Mustangs men's basketball team =

American college basketball season

2017–18 Cal Poly Mustangs men's basketball
- Conference: Big West
- Record: 9–22 (4–12 Big West)
- Head coach: Joe Callero (9th season)
- Assistant coaches: Pawel Mrozik; Sam Kirby; Mitch Reaves
- Home arena: Mott Athletic Center

2017–18 Big West men's basketball standings
	Conf.				Overall
Team	W		L	PCT	W		L	PCT
UC Davis	12	–	4	.750	22	–	11	.667
UC Santa Barbara	11	–	5	.688	23	–	9	.719
UC Irvine	11	–	5	.688	18	–	17	.514
Cal State Fullerton †	10	–	6	.625	20	–	12	.625
Long Beach State	9	–	7	.563	15	–	18	.455
Hawai'i	8	–	8	.500	17	–	13	.567
Cal Poly	4	–	12	.250	9	–	22	.290
UC Riverside	4	–	12	.250	9	–	22	.290
Cal State Northridge	3	–	13	.188	6	–	24	.200
† 2018 Big West tournament winner

The 2017–18 Cal Poly Mustangs men's basketball team represented the California Polytechnic State University in the 2017–18 NCAA Division I men's basketball season. The Mustangs were led by ninth-year head coach Joe Callero and played their home games at Mott Athletic Center as members of the Big West Conference. They finished the season 9–22, 4–12 in Big West play to finish in seventh place. They lost in the quarterfinals of the Big West tournament to UC Santa Barbara.

== Previous season ==
The Mustangs finished the 2016–17 season 11–20, 6–10 in Big West play to finish in seventh place. They lost to UC Davis in the quarterfinals of the Big West tournament.

== Offseason ==
=== Departures ===
Name	Number	Pos.	Height	Weight	Year	Hometown	Reason for departure
Jaylen Shead	4	G	6'1"	190	Sophomore	Pflugerville, TX	Transferred to Texas State
Ridge Shipley	10	G	6'0"	185	Senior	Carrollton, TX	Graduated
Taylor Sutlive	11	G	6'3"	195	RS Junior	San Antonio, TX	Left the team for personal reasons
Kyle Toth	13	G	6'2"	175	Senior	Sunnyvale, CA	Graduated
Alec Raven	23	G	6'5"	193	Sophomore	Santa Rosa, CA	Walk-on; didn't return
Zach Gordon	44	F	6'8"	239	RS Senior	Lynnwood, WA	Graduated

=== Incoming transfers ===
Name	Number	Pos.	Height	Weight	Year	Hometown	Previous school
Marcellus Garrick	11	G	6'4"	190	Junior	Columbia, SC	Junior college transferred from Allan Hancock College
Paulo Cruz	22	G	6'4"	195	Junior	San Diego, CA	Transferred from Arizona. Will be eligible to play, join the team as a walk-on.
Eric Toles Jr.	24	G	6'4"	175	Junior	Elk Grove, CA	Junior college transferred from Sierra College

=== 2017 recruiting class ===
College recruiting information
Name	Hometown	School	Height	Weight	Commit date
Iziah James; PG	Virginia Beach, VA	Cape Henry Collegiate School	6 ft 0 in (1.83 m)	180 lb (82 kg)	Sep 4, 2017
Iziah James; PG	Recruit ratings: Scout: Rivals: 247Sports: ESPN:				
Karlis Gāroza; PF	Saldus, Latvia	BK Liepājas Lauvas	6 ft 9 in (2.06 m)	230 lb (100 kg)	Mar 14, 2017
Karlis Gāroza; PF	Recruit ratings: Scout: Rivals: 247Sports: ESPN:				
Overall recruit ranking:
Note: In many cases, Scout, Rivals, 247Sports, On3, and ESPN may conflict in their listings of height and weight.; In these cases, the average was taken. ESPN grades are on a 100-point scale.; Sources: "Cal Poly 2017 Basketball Commitments". Rivals.; "2017 Cal Poly Commits". Scout.; "ESPN". ESPN.; "Scout.com Team Recruiting Rankings". Scout.; "2017 Team Ranking". Rivals.

=== 2018 recruiting class ===
College recruiting information (2018)
Name	Hometown	School	Height	Weight	Commit date
Daxton Carr; SG	Pocatello, ID	Highland High School	6 ft 7 in (2.01 m)	200 lb (91 kg)	Jul 21, 2017
Daxton Carr; SG	Recruit ratings: Scout: Rivals: 247Sports: ESPN:				
Overall recruit ranking:
Note: In many cases, Scout, Rivals, 247Sports, On3, and ESPN may conflict in their listings of height and weight.; In these cases, the average was taken. ESPN grades are on a 100-point scale.; Sources: "Cal Poly 2018 Basketball Commitments". Rivals.; "2018 Cal Poly Commits". Scout.; "ESPN". ESPN.; "Scout.com Team Recruiting Rankings". Scout.; "2018 Team Ranking". Rivals.

== Roster ==
2017–18 Cal Poly Mustangs men's basketball team
Players
Coaches

Pos.	#	Name	Height	Weight	Year	Previous school	Hometown
F	1	Aleks Abrams	6 ft 8 in (2.03 m)	240 lb (109 kg)	RS Jr	Oaks Christian School	Westlake Village, California
G	2	Trevor John	6 ft 3 in (1.91 m)	185 lb (84 kg)	RS Jr	Monte Vista HS	Danville, California
G	3	Donovan Fields	5 ft 10 in (1.78 m)	160 lb (73 kg)	Jr	Newburgh Free Academy; Odessa College	Newburgh, New York
G	4	Iziah James	6 ft 0 in (1.83 m)	180 lb (82 kg)	Fr	Cape Henry Collegiate HS	Chesapeake, Virginia
G/F	5	Mark Crowe	6 ft 5 in (1.96 m)	205 lb (93 kg)	RS Fr	Wilson HS	Dallas, Texas
G	10	Ridge Shipley	6 ft 0 in (1.83 m)	185 lb (84 kg)	Sr	Hebron HS	Carrollton, Texas
G	11	Marcellus Garrick	6 ft 4 in (1.93 m)	190 lb (86 kg)	Jr	Wagner HS; Allan Hancock College	Columbia, South Carolina
F	15	Josh Martin	6 ft 8 in (2.03 m)	220 lb (100 kg)	RS Jr	Bothell HS; Minnesota	Seattle, Washington
G	20	Victor Joseph	6 ft 0 in (1.83 m)	170 lb (77 kg)	Sr	Rancho Cucamonga HS; Chaffey College	Rancho Cucamonga, California
F	21	Luke Meikle	6 ft 9 in (2.06 m)	209 lb (95 kg)	RS Sr	Bellarmine Prep; Gonzaga	Tacoma, Washington
G	22	Paulo Cruz (W)	6 ft 4 in (1.93 m)	210 lb (95 kg)	Jr	Francis Parker School; Arizona	San Diego, California
F	23	Karlis Garoza	6 ft 9 in (2.06 m)	230 lb (104 kg)	Fr	Liepaja Secondary School	Saldus, Latvia
G	24	Eric Toles	6 ft 4 in (1.93 m)	185 lb (84 kg)	Jr	Cosumnes Oaks HS; Sierra College	Elk Grove, California
C	30	Hank Hollingsworth	6 ft 10 in (2.08 m)	235 lb (107 kg)	So	Chelan HS	Chelan, Washington
F	35	Jakub Niziol	6 ft 7 in (2.01 m)	210 lb (95 kg)	Jr	Howard College	Wrocław, Poland

Head coach

- Joe Callero (Central Washington)

Assistant coach(es)

- Pawel Mrozik (Polish Open)
- Sam Kirby (Seattle)
- Mitch Reaves (Washington State)

Legend

- (C) Team captain
- (S) Suspended
- (I) Ineligible
- (W) Walk-on
- Injured
- Current redshirt

Roster

== Schedule and results ==
Date time, TV	Rank^{#}	Opponent^{#}	Result	Record	High points	High rebounds	High assists	Site (attendance) city, state
Exhibition
Nov 2, 2017*; 7:00 pm		Cal State East Bay	W 72–66		18 – Garrick	10 – Martin	3 – Fields	Mott Athletic Center (1,090); San Luis Obispo, CA
Non-conference regular season
Nov 10, 2017*; 4:00 pm, P12N		at Stanford	L 62–78	0–1	21 – Fields	6 – Fields	5 – Fields	Maples Pavilion (6,276); Stanford, CA
Nov 12, 2017*; 1:00 pm, P12N		at California	L 82–85	0–2	19 – Garrick	5 – Meikle	6 – Fields	Haas Pavilion (6,405); Berkeley, CA
Nov 15, 2017*; 7:00 pm		Holy Names	W 76–47	1–2	12 – Niziol	11 – Hollingsworth	6 – Fields	Mott Athletic Center (1,105); San Luis Obispo, CA
Nov 18, 2017*; 7:00 pm		at Santa Clara; Great Alaska Shootout campus site game	W 63–59	2–2	23 – Fields	6 – Hollingsworth	3 – Tied	Leavey Center (1,626); Santa Clara, CA
Nov 22, 2017*; 1:00 pm		vs. College of Charleston; Great Alaska Shootout quarterfinals	W 73–68	3–2	20 – Joseph	6 – Meikle	6 – Fields	Alaska Airlines Center (1,524); Anchorage, AK
Nov 24, 2017*; 6:30 pm		vs. Central Michigan; Great Alaska Shootout semifinals	L 53–56	3–3	20 – Fields	9 – Fields	4 – Fields	Alaska Airlines Center (2,653); Anchorage, AK
Nov 25, 2017*; 6:30 pm		vs. Idaho; Great Alaska Shootout 3rd place game	L 66–75	3–4	23 – Joseph	10 – Meikle	2 – 4 tied	Alaska Airlines Center (3,460); Anchorage, AK
Dec 2, 2017*; 7:00 pm		Pepperdine	W 91–81	4–4	20 – Garrick	10 – Hollingsworth	11 – Fields	Mott Athletic Center (1,384); San Luis Obispo, CA
Dec 9, 2017*; 7:00 pm		Fresno State	L 63–83	4–5	12 – Joseph	6 – Meikle	7 – Meikle	Mott Athletic Center (1,994); San Luis Obispo, CA
Dec 12, 2017*; 4:00 pm		at Bethune–Cookman	L 53–67	4–6	19 – Martin	10 – Martin	4 – Joseph	Moore Gymnasium (704); Daytona Beach, FL
Dec 16, 2017*; 7:00 pm		Princeton	L 60–80	4–7	18 – Meikle	8 – Hollingsworth	4 – Fields	Mott Athletic Center (2,360); San Luis Obispo, CA
Dec 19, 2017*; 5:00 pm, ESPN3		at SMU	L 64–84	4–8	12 – Tied	7 – Martin	8 – Fields	Moody Coliseum (6,480); Dallas, TX
Dec 21, 2017*; 5:00 pm, ESPN3		at Texas–Arlington	L 56–77	4–9	16 – Niziol	6 – Martin	4 – Fields	College Park Center; Arlington, TX
Dec 30, 2017*; 7:00 pm		Notre Dame de Namur	W 73–40	5–9	12 – Fields	11 – Martin	2 – 4 tied	Mott Athletic Center (1,156); San Luis Obispo, CA
Big West regular season
Jan 4, 2018; 7:00 pm		UC Santa Barbara; Blue–Green Rivalry	W 80–79	6–9 (1–0)	22 – Fields	6 – Joseph	6 – Fields	Mott Athletic Center (2,631); San Luis Obispo, CA
Jan 6, 2018; 7:00 pm		Cal State Fullerton	L 97–101 ^{OT}	6–10 (1–1)	33 – Joseph	5 – Tied	6 – Fields	Mott Athletic Center (2,513); San Luis Obispo, CA
Jan 10, 2018; 9:00 pm, OC Sports		at Hawaii	L 45–57	6–11 (1–2)	11 – Joseph	6 – Martin	1 – 4 tied	Stan Sheriff Center (5,189); Honolulu, HI
Jan 18, 2018; 7:00 pm, ESPN3		at UC Irvine	L 73–80	6–12 (1–3)	24 – Martin	12 – Martin	2 – Tied	Bren Events Center (1,429); Irvine, CA
Jan 20, 2018; 7:00 pm, ESPN3		at Cal State Northridge	L 54–72	6–13 (1–4)	14 – Fields	10 – Martin	2 – Martin	Matadome (828); Northridge, CA
Jan 25, 2018; 7:00 pm		Long Beach State	L 71–87	6–14 (1–5)	17 – Fields	7 – Meikle	7 – Fields	Mott Athletic Center (1,833); San Luis Obispo, CA
Jan 27, 2018; 5:00 pm		at UC Davis	L 56–80	6–15 (1–6)	13 – Fields	5 – Martin	3 – Martin	The Pavilion (3,111); Davis, CA
Jan 31, 2018; 7:00 pm		UC Riverside	W 71–68	7–15 (2–6)	22 – Joseph	7 – Hollingsworth	4 – Fields	Mott Athletic Center (1,217); San Luis Obispo, CA
Feb 3, 2018; 7:00 pm		Hawaii	W 78–64	8–15 (3–6)	15 – Fields	6 – Joseph	5 – Joseph	Mott Athletic Center (2,703); San Luis Obispo, CA
Feb 8, 2018; 7:00 pm		at Cal State Fullerton	L 59–75	8–16 (3–7)	16 – Joseph	8 – Martin	8 – Fields	Titan Gym (1,069); Fullerton, CA
Feb 10 2018; 8:00 pm, Prime Ticket		at Long Beach State	L 54–73	8–17 (3–8)	20 – Levin	11 – Tied	3 – Tied	Walter Pyramid (3,047); Long Beach, CA
Feb 15, 2018; 7:00 pm		UC Davis	L 84–92 ^{3OT}	8–18 (3–9)	21 – Meikle	11 – Abrams	6 – Fields	Mott Athletic Center (1,264); San Luis Obispo, CA
Feb 17, 2018; 7:00 pm		UC Irvine	L 58–75	8–19 (3–10)	16 – Joseph	6 – Abrams	2 – Joseph	Mott Athletic Center (2,403); San Luis Obispo, CA
Feb 22, 2018; 7:00 pm		Cal State Northridge	W 90–86 ^{2OT}	9–19 (4–10)	36 – Joseph	18 – Abrams	4 – Tied	Mott Athletic Center (1,250); San Luis Obispo, CA
Mar 1, 2018; 7:00 pm		at UC Riverside	L 63–71	9–20 (4–11)	15 – Niziol	9 – Meikle	5 – Fields	SRC Arena (350); Riverside, CA
Mar 3, 2018; 7:00 pm		at UC Santa Barbara; Blue–Green Rivalry	W 86–61	9–21 (4–12)	20 – Martin	6 – Abrams	5 – Joseph	The Thunderdome (4,823); Santa Barbara, CA
Big West tournament
Mar 8, 2018; 8:30 pm, FS West	(7)	(2) UC Santa Barbara; Quarterfinals	L 53–75	9–22	13 – Joseph	7 – Joseph	3 – Joseph	Honda Center (3,311); Anaheim, CA
*Non-conference game. ^{#}Rankings from AP Poll. (#) Tournament seedings in parentheses. All times are in Pacific Time.
