= 2017–18 UC Davis Aggies men's basketball team =

American college basketball season

2017–18 UC Davis Aggies men's basketball
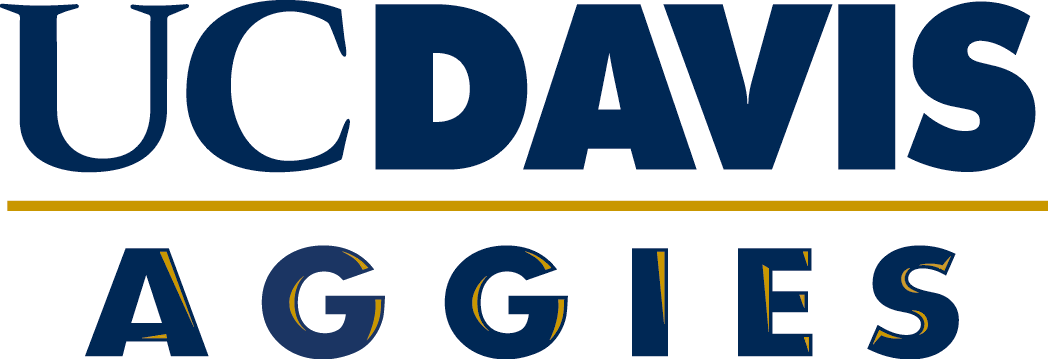

Big West regular season champions

NIT, first round
- Conference: Big West Conference
- Record: 22–11 (12–4 Big West)
- Head coach: Jim Les (7th season)
- Assistant coaches: Kyle Vogt; Chris Davis; Jonathan Metzger-Jones
- Home arena: The Pavilion

2017–18 Big West men's basketball standings
	Conf.				Overall
Team	W		L	PCT	W		L	PCT
UC Davis	12	–	4	.750	22	–	11	.667
UC Santa Barbara	11	–	5	.688	23	–	9	.719
UC Irvine	11	–	5	.688	18	–	17	.514
Cal State Fullerton †	10	–	6	.625	20	–	12	.625
Long Beach State	9	–	7	.563	15	–	18	.455
Hawai'i	8	–	8	.500	17	–	13	.567
Cal Poly	4	–	12	.250	9	–	22	.290
UC Riverside	4	–	12	.250	9	–	22	.290
Cal State Northridge	3	–	13	.188	6	–	24	.200
† 2018 Big West tournament winner

The 2017–18 UC Davis Aggies men's basketball team represented the University of California, Davis during the 2017–18 NCAA Division I men's basketball season. The Aggies, led by seventh-year head coach Jim Les, played their home games at The Pavilion as members of the Big West Conference. They finished the season 22–11, 12–4 in Big West play to win the regular season championship. In the Big West tournament, they defeated UC Riverside before losing to Cal State Fullerton in the semifinals. As a regular season conference champion who did not win their conference tournament, the Aggies received an automatic bid to the National Invitation Tournament where they lost in the first round to Utah.

== Previous season ==
The Aggies finished the 2016–17 season 23–13, 11–5 in Big West play to finish in second place. They defeated Cal Poly, Cal State Fullerton, and UC Irvine to win the Big West tournament. As a result, they earned the conference's automatic bid to the NCAA tournament as a No. 16 seed. They defeated North Carolina Central in the First Four before losing in the first round to Kansas.

== Offseason ==
=== Departures ===
Name	Number	Pos.	Height	Weight	Year	Hometown	Reason for departure
Brynton Lemar	0	G	6'4"	195	Senior	San Diego, CA	Graduated
Lawrence White	1	G	6'4"	203	Senior	Burbank, CA	Graduated
Darius Graham	2	G	5'10"	180	RS Senior	Sacramento, CA	Graduated
Georgi Funtarov	12	F	6'8"	214	Senior	Sofia, Bulgaria	Graduated
J. T. Adenrele	13	F	6'7"	235	RS Senior	Roseville, CA	Graduated
Mikey Henn	24	F	6'8"	230	Freshman	Bellevue, WA	Transferred
Peter Hewitt	40	F	6'9"	215	Freshman	Mountain View, CA	Transferred

=== Incoming transfers ===
Name	Number	Pos.	Height	Weight	Year	Hometown	Previous school
T. J. Shorts	0	G	5'10"	160	Junior	Tustin, CA	Junior college transferred from Saddleback College.
Stefan Gonzalez	2	G	6'2"	195	Junior	Pocatello, ID	Transferred from Saint Mary's. Under NCAA transfer rules, Gonzalez will have to sit out for the 2017–18 season. Will have two years of remaining eligibility.
Matt Neufeld	13	C	6'11"	220	Junior	Victoria, BC	Transferred from Saint Louis. Under NCAA transfer rules, Neufeld will have to sit out for the 2017–18 season. Will have two years of remaining eligibility.

=== 2017 recruiting class ===
College recruiting information
Name	Hometown	School	Height	Weight	Commit date
Logan Strom; PF	Norfolk, NE	Norfolk High School	6 ft 8 in (2.03 m)	240 lb (110 kg)	Sep 22, 2016
Logan Strom; PF	Recruit ratings: Scout: Rivals: (NR)				
Gio Nelson; SG	Corona, CA	Centennial High School	6 ft 5 in (1.96 m)	175 lb (79 kg)	Sep 24, 2016
Gio Nelson; SG	Recruit ratings: Scout: Rivals: (NR)				
Delveion Jackson; SG	Boise, ID	Centennial High School	6 ft 6 in (1.98 m)	195 lb (88 kg)	May 5, 2017
Delveion Jackson; SG	Recruit ratings: Scout: Rivals: (75)				
Overall recruit ranking:
Note: In many cases, Scout, Rivals, 247Sports, On3, and ESPN may conflict in their listings of height and weight.; In these cases, the average was taken. ESPN grades are on a 100-point scale.; Sources: "2017 Team Ranking". Rivals.

== Roster ==
2017–18 UC Davis Aggies men's basketball team
Players
Coaches

Pos.	#	Name	Height	Weight	Year	Previous school	Hometown
G	0	T. J. Shorts	5 ft 9 in (1.75 m)	160 lb (73 kg)	Jr	Tustin HS; Saddleback College	Tustin, CA
G	2	Stefan Gonzalez (redshirt)	6 ft 2 in (1.88 m)	195 lb (88 kg)	Jr	Highland HS; Saint Mary's	Pocatello, ID
G	3	Gio Nelson	6 ft 4 in (1.93 m)	186 lb (84 kg)	Fr	Centennial HS	Corona, CA
G	4	Arell Hennings	5 ft 8 in (1.73 m)	150 lb (68 kg)	Sr	Franklin HS; Cochise College	Seattle, WA
G	5	Siler Schneider	6 ft 3 in (1.91 m)	183 lb (83 kg)	Jr	Lansing HS	Lansing, KS
F	11	Chima Moneke	6 ft 6 in (1.98 m)	223 lb (101 kg)	RS Sr	UCSSCLG; Northeast CC	Canberra, Australia
C	13	Matt Neufeld (redshirt)	6 ft 11 in (2.11 m)	225 lb (102 kg)	Jr	Sunrise Christian Academy; Saint Louis	Victoria, BC
F	21	Colin Rusell	6 ft 10 in (2.08 m)	221 lb (100 kg)	Jr	Folsom HS; Casper College	Folsom, CA
G	22	Joe Mooney	6 ft 3 in (1.91 m)	187 lb (85 kg)	RS So	Notre Dame College Prep	Wauconda, Ill
G	23	Rogers Printup	6 ft 4 in (1.93 m)	205 lb (93 kg)	RS So	Orange Lutheran HS	Orange, CA
G	24	Deleveion Jackson	6 ft 6 in (1.98 m)	210 lb (95 kg)	Fr	Centennial HS	Boise, ID
F	25	A. J. John (W)	6 ft 8 in (2.03 m)	225 lb (102 kg)	RS Jr	Maria Carrillo HS; Pepperdine	Santa Rosa, CA
G	31	Michael Onyebalu (W)	6 ft 3 in (1.91 m)	190 lb (86 kg)	Sr	Norfolk HS	Inglewood, CA
F	32	Logan Strom	6 ft 8 in (2.03 m)	240 lb (109 kg)	Fr	Warren HS	Norfolk, NE
F	42	Jonah Underwood (W)	6 ft 8 in (2.03 m)	220 lb (100 kg)	Jr	Willow Glen HS; San Jose City College	San Jose, CA
F	44	Garrison Goode	6 ft 7 in (2.01 m)	225 lb (102 kg)	Jr	Dominican HS	River Hills, WI

Head coach

- Jim Les (Bradley)

Assistant coach(es)

- Kevin Nosek (UC Davis)
- Kyle Vogt (Lakeland)
- Jonathan Metzger-Jones (Pacific)

Legend

- (C) Team captain
- (S) Suspended
- (I) Ineligible
- (W) Walk-on
- Injured
- Current redshirt

Roster

== Schedule and results ==
Date time, TV	Rank^{#}	Opponent^{#}	Result	Record	Site (attendance) city, state
Exhibition
Nov 7, 2017*; 7:00 pm		Bethesda	W 111–56		The Pavilion; Davis, CA
Non-conference regular season
Nov 13, 2017*; 6:00 pm		at Northern Colorado	W 74–59	1–0	Bank of Colorado Arena (895); Greeley, CO
Nov 15, 2017*; 7:30 pm		at Pacific	W 62–58	2–0	Alex G. Spanos Center (2,506); Stockton, CA
Nov 18, 2017*; 6:00 pm		at Utah Valley	L 71–80	2–1	UCCU Center (2,726); Orem, UT
Nov 21, 2017*; 7:00 pm		vs. Sacramento State; Sacramento Showcase	W 64–47	3–1	Golden 1 Center (2,200); Sacramento, CA
Nov 26, 2017*; 5:00 pm, P12N		at Washington	L 70–77	3–2	Alaska Airlines Arena (5,328); Seattle, WA
Nov 29, 2017*; 7:00 pm		Northern Colorado	W 56–51	4–2	The Pavilion (1,779); Davis, CA
Dec 2, 2017*; 12:00 pm, P12N		at Washington State	W 81–67	5–2	Beasley Coliseum (3,183); Pullman, WA
Dec 6, 2017*; 7:30 pm		Pacific	W 71–67	6–2	The Pavilion (2,177); Davis, CA
Dec 9, 2017*; 2:00 pm		William Jessup	W 86–52	7–2	The Pavilion (1,279); Davis, CA
Dec 15, 2017*; 6:00 pm		at San Francisco; Las Vegas Classic	L 61–74	7–3	War Memorial Gymnasium (2,231); San Francisco, CA
Dec 19, 2017*; 7:00 pm, Stadium		at Nevada; Las Vegas Classic	L 73–88	7–4	Lawlor Events Center (7,475); Reno, NV
Dec 22, 2017*; 1:30 pm		vs. Lamar; Las Vegas Classic	W 77–68	8–4	Orleans Arena; Paradise, NV
Dec 23, 2017*; 2:30 pm		vs. Radford; Las Vegas Classic	L 62–72	8–5	Orleans Arena; Paradise, NV
Dec 30, 2017*; 2:00 pm		Holy Names	W 89–62	9–5	The Pavilion (996); Davis, CA
Big West regular season
Jan 4, 2018; 7:00 pm		UC Irvine	W 64–53	10–5 (1–0)	The Pavilion (1,203); Davis, CA
Jan 11, 2018; 7:00 pm, ESPN3		at UC Riverside	W 75–54	11–5 (2–0)	SRC Center (870); Riverside, CA
Jan 13, 2018; 6:00 pm, ESPN3		at Cal State Fullerton	L 70–85	11–6 (2–1)	Titan Gym (1,267); Fullerton, CA
Jan 17, 2018; 7:00 pm		Long Beach State	W 84–75	11–6 (3–1)	The Pavilion (2,169); Davis, CA
Jan 20, 2018; 9:00 pm		at Hawaii	L 72–77	12–7 (3–2)	Stan Sheriff Center (6,581); Honolulu, HI
Jan 25, 2018; 7:00 pm		Cal State Northridge	W 63–56	13–7 (4–2)	The Pavilion (1,075); Davis, CA
Jan 27, 2018; 5:00 pm		Cal Poly	W 80–56	14–7 (5–2)	The Pavilion (3,111); Davis, CA
Feb 1, 2018; 7:00 pm, ESPN3		at Cal State Northridge	W 63–56	15–7 (6–2)	Matadome (1,006); Northridge, CA
Feb 3, 2018; 7:00 pm, ESPN3		at Long Beach State	W 105–104 ^{2OT}	16–7 (7–2)	Walter Pyramid (2,660); Long Beach, CA
Feb 8, 2018; 7:00 pm		UC Santa Barbara	L 81–90	16–8 (7–3)	The Pavilion (3,392); Davis, CA
Feb 10, 2018; 5:00 pm		Cal State Fullerton	L 66–68	16–9 (7–4)	The Pavilion (3,031); Davis, CA
Feb 15, 2018; 7:00 pm		at Cal Poly	W 92–84 ^{3OT}	17–9 (8–4)	Robert A. Mott Athletics Center (1,264); San Luis Obispo, CA
Feb 17, 2018; 2:00 pm		at UC Santa Barbara	W 71–54	18–9 (9–4)	The Thunderdome (2,883); Santa Barbara, CA
Feb 24, 2018; 5:00 pm		UC Riverside	W 64–63	19–9 (10–4)	The Pavilion (2,704); Davis, CA
Mar 1, 2018; 7:00 pm		Hawaii	W 70–59	20–9 (11–4)	The Pavilion (2,491); Davis, CA
Mar 3, 2018; 7:30 pm		at UC Irvine	W 90–84 ^{2OT}	21–9 (12–4)	Bren Events Center (5,000); Irvine, CA
Big West tournament
Mar 8, 2018; 12:00 pm	(1)	vs. (8) UC Riverside; Quarterfinals	W 70–66	22–9	Honda Center; Anaheim, CA
Mar 9, 2018; 6:30 pm	(1)	vs. (4) Cal State Fullerton; Semifinals	L 52–55	22–10	Honda Center (3,984); Anaheim, CA
NIT
Mar 14, 2018; 6:00 pm, ESPN3	(7)	at (2) Utah; First round – Saint Mary's Bracket	L 59–69	22–11	Jon M. Huntsman Center (3,452); Salt Lake City, UT
*Non-conference game. ^{#}Rankings from AP Poll. (#) Tournament seedings in parentheses. All times are in Pacific Time.
