= 2017–18 Hawaii Rainbow Warriors basketball team =

2017–18 Hawaii Rainbow Warriors basketball

Rainbow Classic champions
- Conference: Big West Conference
- Record: 17–13 (8–8 Big West)
- Head coach: Eran Ganot (3rd season)
- Assistant coaches: Adam Jacobsen; John Montgomery; Marlon Stewart
- Captains: Gibson Johnson; Mike Thomas
- Home arena: Stan Sheriff Center

2017–18 Big West men's basketball standings
	Conf.				Overall
Team	W		L	PCT	W		L	PCT
UC Davis	12	–	4	.750	22	–	11	.667
UC Santa Barbara	11	–	5	.688	23	–	9	.719
UC Irvine	11	–	5	.688	18	–	17	.514
Cal State Fullerton †	10	–	6	.625	20	–	12	.625
Long Beach State	9	–	7	.563	15	–	18	.455
Hawai'i	8	–	8	.500	17	–	13	.567
Cal Poly	4	–	12	.250	9	–	22	.290
UC Riverside	4	–	12	.250	9	–	22	.290
Cal State Northridge	3	–	13	.188	6	–	24	.200
† 2018 Big West tournament winner

The 2017–18 Hawaii Rainbow Warriors basketball team represented the University of Hawaiʻi at Mānoa during the 2017–18 NCAA Division I men's basketball season. The Rainbow Warriors, led by third-year head coach Eran Ganot, played their home games at the Stan Sheriff Center in Honolulu, Hawaii, as members of the Big West Conference. They finished the season 17–13, 8–8 in Big West play to finish in sixth place. They lost in the quarterfinals of the Big West tournament to UC Irvine. They were invited to play in the CollegeInsider.com Postseason Tournament, but they declined the invitation, citing financial concerns.

== Previous season ==
The Rainbow Warriors finished the 2016–17 season 14–16, 8–8 in Big West play to finish in fifth place. As the No. 5 seed in the Big West tournament, they were defeated by Long Beach State in the quarterfinals.

== Departures ==
Name	Number	Pos.	Height	Weight	Year	Hometown	Reason for departure
Darryl Matthews	4	F	6'5"	215	Junior	Los Angeles, CA	Walk-on; transferred
Matthew Owies	5	G	6'0"	180	Freshman	Melbourne, Australia	Transferred to Seattle
Brian Garrett	20	G	6'4"	180	Junior	San Carlos, CA	Walk-on; graduate transferred to Cal State Monterey Bay
Noah Allen	32	G/F	6'7"	215	Senior	Pacific Grove, CA	Graduated
Larry Lewis Jr.	34	G	6'3"	180	Junior	Milwaukee, WI	Graduate transferred to Hawaii Pacific

=== Incoming transfers ===
Name	Number	Pos.	Height	Weight	Year	Hometown	Notes
Brandon Thomas	4	G	6'4"	180	Sophomore	Woodland Hills, CA	Junior college transferred from Riverside City College
Jaaron Stallworth	5	G	6'1"	180	Sophomore	Elk Grove, CA	Junior college transferred from Yuba College

== 2017 Commitments ==
College recruiting information
Name	Hometown	School	Height	Weight	Commit date
Samuta Avea #54 SF	Kahuku, HI	Kahuku High SChool	6 ft 6 in (1.98 m)	190 lb (86 kg)	Nov 16, 2016
Samuta Avea #54 SF	Recruit ratings: Scout: Rivals: 247Sports: ESPN:				
Justin Hemsley #90 PG	La Verne, CA	Damien High School	6 ft 5 in (1.96 m)	180 lb (82 kg)	
Justin Hemsley #90 PG	Recruit ratings: Scout: Rivals: 247Sports: ESPN:				
Overall recruit ranking:
Note: In many cases, Scout, Rivals, 247Sports, On3, and ESPN may conflict in their listings of height and weight.; In these cases, the average was taken. ESPN grades are on a 100-point scale.; Sources: "2017 Team Ranking". Rivals.

== Roster ==
2017–18 Hawaii Rainbow Warriors men's basketball team
Players
Coaches

Pos.	#	Name	Height	Weight	Year	Previous school	Hometown
G	0	Leland Green	6 ft 2 in (1.88 m)	185 lb (84 kg)	So	Redondo Union HS	Los Angeles, California
G	1	Drew Buggs	6 ft 2 in (1.88 m)	190 lb (86 kg)	RS Fr	Long Beach Poly HS	Long Beach, California
G	2	Brocke Stepteau (W)	5 ft 9 in (1.75 m)	170 lb (77 kg)	Jr	Dallas Jesuit Prep School	Dallas, Texas
G	4	Brandon Thomas	6 ft 4 in (1.93 m)	175 lb (79 kg)	So	Taft HS; Riverside City College	Woodland Hills, California
G	5	Jaaron Stallworth	6 ft 1 in (1.85 m)	180 lb (82 kg)	So	Cosumnes Oaks HS; Yuba College	Elk Grove, California
F	12	Jack Purchase	6 ft 9 in (2.06 m)	210 lb (95 kg)	Jr	Carey Grammar; Auburn	Melbourne, Australia
F	13	Mike Thomas (C)	6 ft 7 in (2.01 m)	220 lb (100 kg)	Sr	El Camino Real HS	Woodland Hills, California
F	14	Zigmars Raimo	6 ft 7 in (2.01 m)	235 lb (107 kg)	So	Riga Secondary School No. 49	Madona, Latvia
C	15	Ido Flaisher	6 ft 10 in (2.08 m)	235 lb (107 kg)	So	Hadash Herzliya HS	Herzliya, Israel
F	21	Gibson Johnson (C)	6 ft 8 in (2.03 m)	220 lb (100 kg)	Sr	Viewmont HS; Salt Lake Community College	Centerville, Utah
G	23	Sheriff Drammeh	6 ft 3 in (1.91 m)	160 lb (73 kg)	Jr	Igelstavikens Gymnasium	Stockholm, Sweden
G	24	Zach Buscher (W)	6 ft 3 in (1.91 m)	180 lb (82 kg)	Jr	ʻIolani School	Kailua, Hawaii
G/F	32	Samuta Avea	6 ft 6 in (1.98 m)	190 lb (86 kg)	Fr	Kahuku HS	Hauʻula, Hawaii
F	35	Trevor LaCount (W)	6 ft 7 in (2.01 m)	185 lb (84 kg)	RS Jr	Ventura HS; Ventura Community College	Ventura, California
G/F	42	Justin Hemsley	6 ft 5 in (1.96 m)	185 lb (84 kg)	Fr	Damien HS	Rancho Cucamonga, California

Head coach

- Eran Ganot (Swarthmore College)

Assistant coach(es)

- Adam Jacobsen (Pacific)
- John Montgomery (Loyola Marymount)
- Chris Acker (Chaminade)

Legend

- (C) Team captain
- (S) Suspended
- (I) Ineligible
- (W) Walk-on
- Injured
- Current redshirt

Roster
Last update: November 20, 2017

== Schedule and results ==
Date time, TV	Rank^{#}	Opponent^{#}	Result	Record	Site (attendance) city, state
Exhibition
Nov 1, 2017*; 8:00 pm		Hawaii Pacific	W 90–70		Stan Sheriff Center (5,110); Honolulu, HI
Non-conference regular season
Nov 10, 2017*; 7:00 pm, Spectrum Sports		Arkansas–Pine Bluff; Outrigger Resorts Rainbow Classic	W 82–70	1–0	Stan Sheriff Center (5,764); Honolulu, HI
Nov 12, 2017*; 5:00 pm, Spectrum Sports		North Dakota; Outrigger Resorts Rainbow Classic	W 81–78	2–0	Stan Sheriff Center (5,180); Honolulu, HI
Nov 13, 2017*; 7:00 pm, Spectrum Sports		Troy; Outrigger Resorts Rainbow Classic	W 72–67 ^{OT}	3–0	Stan Sheriff Center (5,078); Honolulu, HI
Nov 24, 2017*; 8:00 pm, Spectrum Sports		Nevada	L 54–67	3–1	Stan Sheriff Center (6,309); Honolulu, HI
Nov 27, 2017*; 7:00 pm, Spectrum Sports		Adams State	W 87–77	4–1	Stan Sheriff Center (4,515); Honolulu, HI
Dec 2, 2017*; 2:00 pm, P12N		at Utah	L 60–80	4–2	Jon M. Huntsman Center (13,896); Salt Lake City, UT
Dec 6, 2017*; 7:00 pm, Spectrum Sports		Prairie View A&M	W 72–60	5–2	Stan Sheriff Center (4,963); Honolulu, HI
Dec 9, 2017*; 9:00 pm, Spectrum Sports		UH Hilo	W 82–64	6–2	Stan Sheriff Center (5,003); Honolulu, HI
Dec 17, 2017*; 5:00 pm, Spectrum Sports		Utah Valley	W 70–69	7–2	Stan Sheriff Center (5,187); Honolulu, HI
Dec 22, 2017*; 8:00 pm, ESPNU		No. 6 Miami (FL); Diamond Head Classic quarterfinals	L 57–75	7–3	Stan Sheriff Center (7,669); Honolulu, HI
Dec 23, 2017*; 7:30 pm, ESPNU		Davidson; Diamond Head Classic consolation 2nd round	W 79–71	8–3	Stan Sheriff Center (5,946); Honolulu, HI
Dec 25, 2017*; 9:30 am, ESPNU		Princeton; Diamond Head Classic 5th place game	L 63–77	8–4	Stan Sheriff Center (6,698); Honolulu, HI
Dec 29, 2017*; 7:00 pm, Spectrum Sports		Howard	W 84–59	9–4	Stan Sheriff Center (5,296); Honolulu, HI
Big West regular season
Jan 4, 2018; 5:00 pm, ESPN3		at Long Beach State	L 81–89	9–5 (0–1)	Walter Pyramid (2,246); Long Beach, CA
Jan 6, 2018; 5:00 pm, ESPN3		at Cal State Northridge	W 65–46	10–5 (1–1)	Matadome (686); Northridge, CA
Jan 10, 2018; 7:00 pm, Spectrum Sports		Cal Poly	W 57–45	11–5 (2–1)	Stan Sheriff Center (5,189); Honolulu, HI
Jan 13, 2018; 8:00 pm, Spectrum Sports		UC Santa Barbara	W 77–76	12–5 (3–1)	Stan Sheriff Center (5,719); Honolulu, HI
Jan 20, 2018; 7:00 pm, Spectrum Sports		UC Davis	W 77–72	13–5 (4–1)	Stan Sheriff Center (6,581); Honolulu, HI
Jan 27, 2018; 8:00 pm, Spectrum Sports		Cal State Fullerton	L 66–69	13–6 (4–2)	Stan Sheriff Center (6,869); Honolulu, HI
Feb 1, 2018; 5:00 pm		at UC Santa Barbara	L 82–84 ^{OT}	13–7 (4–3)	UC Santa Barbara Events Center (2,317); Santa Barbara, CA
Feb 3, 2018; 5:00 pm		at Cal Poly	L 64–78	13–8 (4–4)	Mott Athletics Center (2,703); San Luis Obispo, CA
Feb 7, 2018; 7:00 pm, Spectrum Sports		UC Riverside	L 60–64	13–9 (4–5)	Stan Sheriff Center (5,206); Honolulu, HI
Feb 10, 2018; 7:00 pm, Spectrum Sports		Cal State Northridge	L 71–77	13–10 (4–6)	Stan Sheriff Center (5,945); Honolulu, HI
Feb 15, 2018; 6:00 pm, ESPN3		at UC Irvine	W 62–61	14–10 (5–6)	Bren Events Center (1,424); Irvine, CA
Feb 17, 2018; 3:00 pm, FS Prime Ticket		at UC Riverside	W 74–69 ^{OT}	15–10 (6–6)	UC Riverside Student Recreation Center (465); Riverside, CA
Feb 22, 2018; 7:00 pm, Spectrum Sports		Long Beach State	W 74–63	16–10 (7–6)	Stan Sheriff Center (5,409); Honolulu, HI
Feb 24, 2018; 7:00 pm, Spectrum Sports		UC Irvine	L 57–66	16–11 (7–7)	Stan Sheriff Center (7,353); Honolulu, HI
Mar 1, 2018; 5:00 pm		at UC Davis	L 59–70	16–12 (7–8)	The Pavilion (2,491); Davis, CA
Mar 3, 2018; 1:00 pm, FS Prime Ticket		at Cal State Fullerton	W 68–60	17–12 (8–8)	Titan Gym (972); Fullerton, CA
Big West tournament
Mar 8, 2018; 6:00 pm, Fox Sport West	(6)	vs. (3) UC Irvine; Quarterfinals	L 67–68	17–13	Honda Center (3,311); Anaheim, CA
*Non-conference game. ^{#}Rankings from AP Poll. (#) Tournament seedings in parentheses. All times are in Hawaii–Aleutian Time..

== See also ==
- 2017–18 Hawaii Rainbow Wahine basketball team
