= 2017–18 Long Beach State 49ers men's basketball team =

American college basketball season

2017–18 Long Beach State 49ers men's basketball
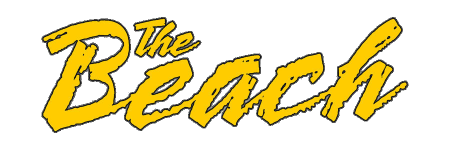
- Conference: Big West Conference
- Record: 15–18 (9–7 Big West)
- Head coach: Dan Monson (11th season)
- Assistant coaches: Rod Palmer; Myke Scholl; Senque Carey
- Home arena: Walter Pyramid

2017–18 Big West men's basketball standings
	Conf.				Overall
Team	W		L	PCT	W		L	PCT
UC Davis	12	–	4	.750	22	–	11	.667
UC Santa Barbara	11	–	5	.688	23	–	9	.719
UC Irvine	11	–	5	.688	18	–	17	.514
Cal State Fullerton †	10	–	6	.625	20	–	12	.625
Long Beach State	9	–	7	.563	15	–	18	.455
Hawai'i	8	–	8	.500	17	–	13	.567
Cal Poly	4	–	12	.250	9	–	22	.290
UC Riverside	4	–	12	.250	9	–	22	.290
Cal State Northridge	3	–	13	.188	6	–	24	.200
† 2018 Big West tournament winner

The 2017–18 Long Beach State 49ers men's basketball team represented California State University, Long Beach during the 2017–18 NCAA Division I men's basketball season. The 49ers were led by 11th-year head coach Dan Monson and played their home games at the Walter Pyramid as members of the Big West Conference. They finished the season 15–18, 9–7 in Big West play to finish in fifth place. They lost in the quarterfinals of the Big West tournament to Cal State Fullerton.

== Previous season ==
The 49ers finished the 2016–17 season 15–19, 9–7 in Big West play to finish in fourth place. They defeated Hawaii in the quarterfinals of the Big West tournament before losing to UC Irvine in the semifinals.

== Offseason ==
=== Departures ===
Name	Number	Pos.	Height	Weight	Year	Hometown	Reason for departure
Evan Payne	1	G	6'1"	190	RS Junior	Akron, OH	Signed to play professionally in Czech Republic with BK NH Ostrava
Loren Cristian Jackson	2	G	5'8"	145	Freshman	Chicago, IL	Transferred to Akron
Noah Blackwell	3	G	6'2"	190	Sophomore	Roseville, CA	Transferred to Fresno State
Alex Rifkind	12	G	6'1"	170	RS Sophomore	Boca Raton, FL	Walk-on; left the team for personal reasons
Anson Moye	20	G	6'0"	185	Senior	Thousand Oaks, CA	Walk-on; graduated
Justin Bibbins	21	G	5'8"	150	Junior	Carson, CA	Graduate transferred to Utah
Roschon Price	23	F	6'6"	235	RS Junior	Long Beach, CA	Graduate transferred to Detroit

=== Incoming transfers ===
Name	Number	Pos.	Height	Weight	Year	Hometown	Notes
Bryan Alberts	10	G	6'5"	198	RS Junior	Northridge, CA	Transferred from Gonzaga. Will be eligible to play for two seasons since Alberts graduated from Gonzaga.
Deishuan Booker	15	G	6'3"	180	Junior	North Las Vegas, NV	Junior college transferred from College of Southern Idaho

=== 2017 incoming recruits ===
College recruiting information
Name	Hometown	School	Height	Weight	Commit date
Jordan Roberts #79 SF	Bakersfield, CA	Ridgeview High School	6 ft 6 in (1.98 m)	195 lb (88 kg)	Aug 26, 2016
Jordan Roberts #79 SF	Recruit ratings: Scout: Rivals: (66)				
Milos Apic; SF	Sandy Spring, MD	Sandy Spring Friends School	6 ft 10 in (2.08 m)	200 lb (91 kg)	
Milos Apic; SF	Recruit ratings: Scout: Rivals: (NR)				
Edon Maxhuni; PG	Hyvinkaa, Finland	Helsinki Basketball Academy	6 ft 1 in (1.85 m)	160 lb (73 kg)	
Edon Maxhuni; PG	Recruit ratings: Scout: Rivals: (NR)				
Overall recruit ranking:
Note: In many cases, Scout, Rivals, 247Sports, On3, and ESPN may conflict in their listings of height and weight.; In these cases, the average was taken. ESPN grades are on a 100-point scale.; Sources: "2017 Team Ranking". Rivals.

=== 2018 incoming recruits ===
College recruiting information (2018)
Name	Hometown	School	Height	Weight	Commit date
Greg Floyd Jr. #39 SF	Las Vegas, NV	Middlebrooks Academy	6 ft 9 in (2.06 m)	200 lb (91 kg)	Sep 7, 2016
Greg Floyd Jr. #39 SF	Recruit ratings: Scout: Rivals: (80)				
Demetrius Mims #47 SF	Baltimore, MD	Polytechnic Institute High School	6 ft 5 in (1.96 m)	N/A	Sep 8, 2017
Demetrius Mims #47 SF	Recruit ratings: Scout: Rivals: (79)				
Overall recruit ranking:
Note: In many cases, Scout, Rivals, 247Sports, On3, and ESPN may conflict in their listings of height and weight.; In these cases, the average was taken. ESPN grades are on a 100-point scale.; Sources: "2018 Team Ranking". Rivals.

== Roster ==
2017–18 Long Beach State 49ers men's basketball team
Players
Coaches

Pos.	#	Name	Height	Weight	Year	Previous school	Hometown
F	0	Gabe Levin	6 ft 7 in (2.01 m)	230 lb (104 kg)	RS Sr	St. Thomas More School; Loyola Marymount	Oak Park, IL
F	2	Javonntie Jackson	6 ft 6 in (1.98 m)	190 lb (86 kg)	So	Compton HS	Compton, CA
F	3	Jordan Roberts	6 ft 8 in (2.03 m)	195 lb (88 kg)	Fr	Ridgeview HS	Bakersfield, CA
F	4	Temidayo Yussuf	6 ft 7 in (2.01 m)	265 lb (120 kg)	RS Jr	St. Joseph HS	Oakland, CA
F	5	Mason Riggins	6 ft 8 in (2.03 m)	230 lb (104 kg)	Jr	Whitewright HS	Whitewright, TX
G	10	Bryan Alberts	6 ft 5 in (1.96 m)	200 lb (91 kg)	RS Jr	Village Christian; Gonzaga	Northridge, CA
G	11	Jordan Griffin	6 ft 3 in (1.91 m)	165 lb (75 kg)	So	Centennial HS	Corona, CA
F	12	Quentin Shropshire (W)	6 ft 6 in (1.98 m)	205 lb (93 kg)	Sr	University HS	Los Angeles, CA
G/F	13	Barry Ogalue (W)	6 ft 5 in (1.96 m)	195 lb (88 kg)	RS Sr	Laguna Creek HS; Yuba CC	Elk Grove, CA
F	14	K. J. Byers	6 ft 7 in (2.01 m)	195 lb (88 kg)	Jr	Phillip O. Berry HS; Panola CC	Charlotte, NC
G	15	Deishuan Booker	6 ft 3 in (1.91 m)	170 lb (77 kg)	Jr	Agassi HS; College of Southern Idaho	Las Vegas, NV
G	20	Breamon Richard (W)	5 ft 10 in (1.78 m)	160 lb (73 kg)	RS Jr	University HS; Long Beach City College	Los Angeles, CA
F	21	Jaice Gardner (W)	6 ft 4 in (1.93 m)	200 lb (91 kg)	Fr	La Salle HS	Encino, CA
F	22	LaRond Williams	6 ft 9 in (2.06 m)	200 lb (91 kg)	RS So	Price HS	Long Beach, CA
G	23	Edon Maxhuni	6 ft 2 in (1.88 m)	185 lb (84 kg)	Fr	Helsinki Basketball Academy	Hyvinkää, Finland
F	35	Milos Apic	6 ft 10 in (2.08 m)	200 lb (91 kg)	Fr	Sandy Spring Friends School	Novi Sad, Serbia

Head coach

- Dan Monson (Idaho)

Assistant coach(es)

- Rod Palmer (UC Irvine)
- Myke Scholl (Loyola Marymount)
- Senque Carey (New Mexico)

Legend

- (C) Team captain
- (S) Suspended
- (I) Ineligible
- (W) Walk-on
- Injured
- Current redshirt

Roster

== Schedule and results ==
Date time, TV	Rank^{#}	Opponent^{#}	Result	Record	Site city, state
Exhibition
Oct 30, 2017*; 8:00 pm		Cal State Bakersfield; Community Foundation of Sonoma County	L 55–63		Walter Pyramid (345); Long Beach, CA
Nov 4, 2017*; 4:00 pm		Cal State Dominguez Hills; Homecoming	W 87–71		Walter Pyramid (4,227); Long Beach, CA
Non-conference regular season
Nov 10, 2017*; 8:00 pm		at San Francisco	W 83–71	1–0	War Memorial Gymnasium (2,496); San Francisco, CA
Nov 14, 2017*; 7:00 pm		San Francisco State	W 95–70	2–0	Walter Pyramid (2,415); Long Beach, CA
Nov 18, 2017*; 8:00 pm, P12N		at Oregon State	L 81–89	2–1	Gill Coliseum (5,438); Corvallis, OR
Nov 20, 2017*; 4:00 pm		at No. 23 West Virginia; AdvoCare Invitational campus game	L 62–91	2–2	WVU Coliseum (8,676); Morgantown, WV
Nov 23, 2017*; 8:30 am, ESPN2		vs. Missouri; AdvoCare Invitational quarterfinals	L 58–95	2–3	HP Field House (2,712); Lake Buena Vista, FL
Nov 24, 2017*; 10:30 am, ESPN3		vs. Oregon State; AdvoCare Invitational consolation 2nd round	W 74–69	3–3	HP Field House (2,367); Lake Buena Vista, FL
Nov 26, 2017*; 11:00 am, ESPNU		vs. Nebraska; AdvoCare Invitational 5th place game	L 80–85	3–4	HP Field House (1,712); Lake Buena Vista, FL
Nov 29, 2017*; 5:00 pm, P12N		at Arizona	L 56–91	3–5	McKale Center (13,626); Tucson, AZ
Dec 2, 2017*; 4:00 pm		Fresno State	L 70–106	3–6	Walter Pyramid (3,706); Long Beach, CA
Dec 3, 2017*; 2:00 pm		Stanford	W 76–68	4–6	Walter Pyramid (2,564); Long Beach, CA
Dec 6, 2017*; 5:30 pm		at Southern Utah	L 89–94	4–7	America First Events Center (2,487); Cedar City, UT
Dec 9, 2017*; 7:00 pm		at Pepperdine	W 78–71	5–7	Firestone Fieldhouse (2,487); Malibu, CA
Dec 16, 2017*; 4:00 pm		Eastern Michigan	L 80–85	5–8	Walter Pyramid (2,391); Long Beach, CA
Dec 21, 2017*; 4:00 pm, BTN		at No. 2 Michigan State	L 60–102	5–9	Breslin Center (14,797); East Lansing, MI
Dec 23, 2017*; 1:00 pm		at Colorado State	L 66–68	5–10	Moby Arena (2,752); Fort Collins, CO
Dec 30, 2017*; 4:00 pm		Texas A&M International	W 77–59	6–10	Walter Pyramid (2,051); Long Beach, CA
Big West regular season
Jan 4, 2018; 7:00 pm, ESPN3		Hawaii	W 89–81	7–10 (1–0)	Walter Pyramid (2,246); Long Beach, CA
Jan 6, 2018; 7:00 pm		at UC Irvine	L 73–86	7–11 (1–1)	Bren Events Center (1,723); Irvine, CA
Jan 10, 2018; 7:00 pm, FS West		Cal State Northridge	W 80–70	8–11 (2–1)	Walter Pyramid (2,315); Long Beach, CA
Jan 13, 2018; 6:00 pm		at UC Riverside	W 75–57	9–11 (3–1)	SRC Arena (567); Riverside, CA
Jan 17, 2018; 7:00 pm		at UC Davis	L 75–84	9–12 (3–2)	The Pavilion (2,169); Davis, CA
Jan 20, 2018; 7:30 pm, FS West		Cal State Fullerton	W 81–73	10–12 (4–2)	Walter Pyramid (3,037); Long Beach, CA
Jan 25, 2018; 7:00 pm		at Cal Poly	W 87–71	11–12 (5–2)	Robert A. Mott Athletics Center (1,833); San Louis Obispo, CA
Jan 27, 2018; 7:00 pm		at Cal State Northridge	W 70–66	12–12 (6–2)	Matadome (1,207); Northridge, CA
Jan 31, 2018; 7:30 pm, FS West		UC Irvine	L 68–75	12–13 (6–3)	Walter Pyramid (2,833); Long Beach, CA
Feb 3, 2018; 4:00 pm, ESPN3		UC Davis	L 104–105 ^{2OT}	12–14 (6–4)	Walter Pyramid (2,660); Long Beach, CA
Feb 10, 2018; 8:00 pm, FS West		Cal Poly	W 73–54	13–14 (7–4)	Walter Pyramid (3,047); Long Beach, CA
Feb 15, 2018; 7:00 pm		UC Santa Barbara	L 70–80	13–15 (7–5)	Walter Pyramid (3,015); Long Beach, CA
Feb 22, 2018; 9:00 pm		at Hawaii	L 63–74	13–16 (7–6)	Stan Sheriff Center (5,409); Honolulu, HI
Feb 24, 2018; 7:00 pm, ESPN2		Cal State Fullerton	L 71–81	13–17 (7–7)	Titan Gym (1,653); Fullerton, CA
Mar 1, 2018; 8:00 pm, ESPNU		at UC Santa Barbara	W 70–69	14–17 (8–7)	The Thunderdome (1,743); Santa Barbara, CA
Mar 3, 2018; 7:30 pm		UC Riverside	W 77–59	15–17 (9–7)	Walter Pyramid (2,930); Long Beach, CA
Big West tournament
Mar 8, 2018; 2:30 pm, FS West	(5)	vs. (4) Cal State Fullerton; Quarterfinals	L 74–76	15–18	Honda Center; Anaheim, CA
*Non-conference game. ^{#}Rankings from AP Poll. (#) Tournament seedings in parentheses. All times are in Pacific Time.
