= Zack Moore (basketball) =

Japanese-American basketball player (born 1997)

No. 8 – Earthfriends Tokyo Z
- Position: Shooting guard
- League: B.League

Personal information
- Born: March 26, 1997 (age 29) Bellevue, Washington, U.S.
- Listed height: 6 ft 5 in (1.96 m)
- Listed weight: 200 lb (91 kg)

Career information
- High school: Bellevue (Bellevue, Washington)
- College: Seattle (2015–2017); UC Santa Barbara (2018–2019); UBC (2019–2020)
- NBA draft: 2020: undrafted
- Playing career: 2021–present

Career history
- 2021–2022: Osaka Evessa
- 2022–2023: Kyoto Hannaryz
- 2024–present: Earthfriends Tokyo Z

Zack Moore (ザック・ムーア, Zakku Mūa; born March 26, 1997) is a Japanese-American professional basketball player for Earthfriends Tokyo Z of the B.League. He played college basketball for the Seattle Redhawks, UC Santa Barbara Gauchos and the UBC Thunderbirds.

== High school career ==
Moore attended Bellevue High School in Bellevue, Washington and played for its varsity basketball team. As a senior, he averaged 12.6 points per game, helping the Wolverines finish the season with a 25–4 record. For his performance, he was named to the Second Team All-King County.

Moore also played club basketball for the Emerald City Basketball Academy Pioneers.

== College career ==
=== Seattle ===
Moore attended Seattle University and played for the Redhawks. He made his collegiate debut on December 17, 2015, against the Northwest Indian Eagles, posting season-highs on scoring and rebounds with 17 and seven, respectively, while shooting 63.6 percent from the field and 50.0 percent from three. As a freshman, he averaged 3.1 points, 1.2 rebounds and 0.4 assists over 16 games.

In his first game of the season, Moore scored 15 points and grabbed two rebounds against the Pacific Lutheran Lutes on November 11, 2016. On January 26, 2017, he grabbed a season-high nine rebounds versus the New Mexico State Aggies. Two days later, he posted a season-high 33 points on 11-of-14 shooting from the field and 8-of-10 from three, to go along with six rebounds, two assists, one block and two steals in a 96–84 win over UTRGV Vaqueros, setting a program record for the second most 3-pointers in a single game. As a sophomore, Moore made 16 starts and he averaged 10.4 points, 3.9 rebounds and 0.9 assists in 26.6 minutes per game while shooting 41.6 percent from the field and 37.9 percent from three. He led the Redhawks in 3-pointers made for the season with 74.

=== UC Santa Barbara ===
Moore transferred to University of California, Santa Barbara and sat out the 2017–18 season.

On November 6, 2018, Moore made his debut for the Gauchos in a game against the Wyoming Cowboys, scoring a season-high six points and grabbing one rebound. On November 13, he registered season-highs on rebounds and assists with four and seven, respectively, versus California Lutheran University. Moore finished the season averaging 1.2 points, 0.6 rebounds and 1.1 assists in 6.9 minutes over 11 games.

=== UBC ===
Moore transferred from NCAA to U Sports, where he played for the University of British Columbia. On January 4, 2020, he scored a season-high 14 points against UFV Cascades. On February 21, Moore logged a double-double with 13 points and a season-high 11 rebounds in a playoff win over the Saskatchewan Huskies. He started in 16 of 30 games for the Thunderbirds, averaging 7.4 points, 5.7 rebounds and 1.5 assists for the 2019–20 season.

With the 2020–21 U Sports season being cancelled due to COVID-19 pandemic, Moore did not play a single game for the Thunderbirds.

== Professional career ==
On June 11, 2021, Moore signed with the Osaka Evessa of the B.League.

On June 8, 2022, Moore signed with the Kyoto Hannaryz of the B.League.

On January 9, 2024, Moore signed with the Earthfriends Tokyo Z of the B.League.

On June 27, 2024, Moore resigned with the Earthfriends Tokyo Z of the B.League.

== Personal life ==
Moore, a Japanese-American, was born in Bellevue, Washington. He has one older brother named Jeffrey.

== Career statistics ==
Legend
GP	Games played	GS	Games started	MPG	Minutes per game
FG%	Field goal percentage	3P%	3-point field goal percentage	FT%	Free throw percentage
RPG	Rebounds per game	APG	Assists per game	SPG	Steals per game
BPG	Blocks per game	PPG	Points per game	**Bold**	Career high

=== College ===
==== U Sports ====
Year	Team	GP	GS	MPG	FG%	3P%	FT%	RPG	APG	SPG	BPG	PPG
2019–20	UBC	30	16	23.6	.384	.296	.677	5.7	1.5	1.2	.4	7.4

==== NCAA Division I ====
Year	Team	GP	GS	MPG	FG%	3P%	FT%	RPG	APG	SPG	BPG	PPG
2015–16	Seattle	16	0	8.0	.457	.407	**1.000**	1.2	.4	.1	.1	3.1
2016–17	Seattle	**30**	**16**	**26.6**	.416	.379	.875	**3.9**	.9	**.8**	**.2**	**10.4**
2017–18	UC Santa Barbara	Redshirt										
2018–19	UC Santa Barbara	11	0	6.9	**.556**	**.600**	–	.6	**1.1**	.3	**.2**	1.2
Career		57	16	17.6	.425	.388	.894	2.5	.8	.5	.1	6.6
