= Dedrique Taylor =

American basketball coach (born 1974)

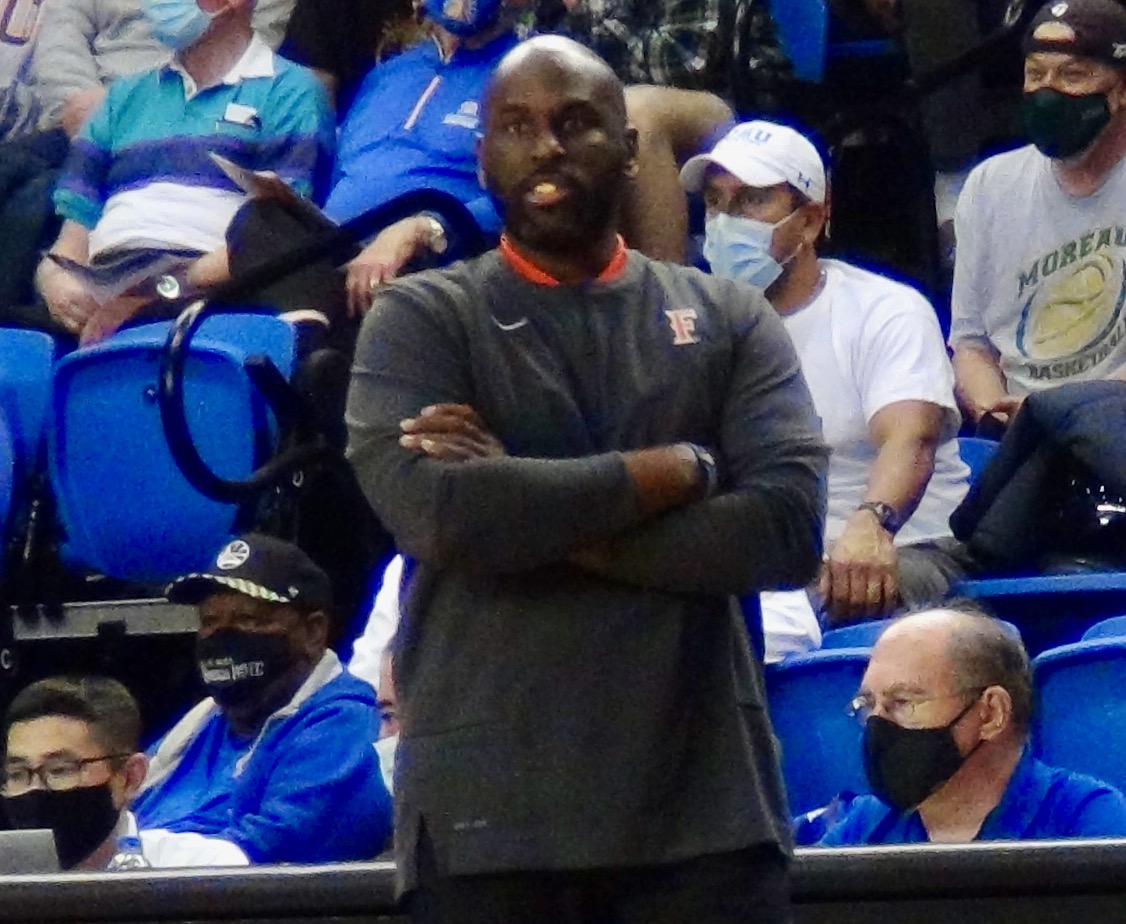
- Taylor with CS Fullerton in 2021

Current position
- Title: Head coach
- Team: Cal State Fullerton
- Conference: Big West
- Record: 181–223 (.448)

Biographical details
- Born: May 1, 1974 (age 52)

Playing career
- 1993–1994: Kings River CC
- 1994–1995: Armstrong Atlantic State
- 1995–1997: UC Davis

Coaching career (HC unless noted)
- 2000–2001: UC Davis (asst.)
- 2001–2002: Loyola Marymount (asst.)
- 2002–2004: Portland State (asst.)
- 2004–2006: Nevada (asst.)
- 2006–2010: Arizona State (asst.)
- 2010–2013: Arizona State (assoc. HC)
- 2013–present: Cal State Fullerton

Head coaching record
- Overall: 181–223 (.448)
- Tournaments: 0–2 (NCAA Division I); 0–2 (CIT)

Accomplishments and honors

Championships
- 2 Big West tournament (2018, 2022)

Awards
- Big West Coach of the Year (2026)

Dedrique LaMonte Taylor (born May 1, 1974) is an American basketball coach and former player who is currently the college basketball head coach for Cal State Fullerton. He is also a former Arizona State associate head men's basketball coach and a college assistant coach.

== Early life and education ==
After graduating from Pomona High School in Pomona, California in 1992, Taylor began his college basketball career at Kings River Community College (now Reedley College). He then transferred to NCAA Division II school Armstrong Atlantic State University (now Armstrong State University) in 1994 and played his last two seasons at UC Davis from 1995 to 1997. Taylor graduated from UC Davis in 1997 with a bachelor's degree in sociology and organizational studies and later completed a master's degree in sports administration in 2000 at the United States Sports Academy.

== Coaching career ==
=== Early coaching career (2000–2013) ===
Taylor began his coaching career in 2000 at UC Davis. In 2001, he became strength and conditioning coach at Loyola Marymount. From 2002 to 2004, he was an assistant coach at Portland State, followed by two years at Nevada as assistant coach from 2004 to 2006.

Taylor was an assistant coach for Arizona State University from 2006 to 2013. In 2010, he was promoted to associate head coach named one of the top 25 assistant coaches in the nation by CollegeInsider.com. He helped ASU make four 20-win seasons, including a 25–10 overall record in 2008–2009. In 2012–13, Taylor guided the Sun Devils to a 22–13 record and advanced to the second round of the National Invitational Tournament.

=== Cal State Fullerton (2013–present) ===
Taylor was named the head coach at Cal State Fullerton, a member of the Big West Conference, in April 2013. Taylor achieved his first winning season in 2016–17 when Cal State Fullerton finished 17–15 (10–6 Big West), also Fullerton's first winning season in five years. Having finished third in the Big West standings, Cal State Fullerton appeared in the 2017 CollegeInsider.com Postseason Tournament.

In his fifth season in 2017–18, Taylor led Cal State Fullerton to a career high 20–12 (10–6 Big West) the first Big West tournament title and NCAA tournament appearance in 10 years. Then in 2018–19, Cal State Fullerton finished tied for second in the Big West standings and appeared in the 2019 CollegeInsider.com Postseason Tournament.

On February 23, 2021, Taylor achieved his 100th win as head coach. In 2021–22, Taylor reached a new career high in wins with a 21–10 (12–5 Big West) record. Cal State Fullerton won its second Big West tournament under Taylor with a 72–71 win over Long Beach State.

== Head coaching record ==
Record table
Season	Team	Overall	Conference	Standing	Postseason
Cal State Fullerton Titans (Big West Conference) (2013–present)
2013–14	Cal State Fullerton	11–20	6–10	T–6th	
2014–15	Cal State Fullerton	9–22	1–15	9th	
2015–16	Cal State Fullerton	10–20	3–13	9th	
2016–17	Cal State Fullerton	17–15	10–6	3rd	CIT first round
2017–18	Cal State Fullerton	20–12	10–6	4th	NCAA Division I Round of 64
2018–19	Cal State Fullerton	16–18	10–6	T–2nd	CIT first round
2019–20	Cal State Fullerton	11–20	6–10	T–7th	
2020–21	Cal State Fullerton	6–10	5–7	T–7th	
2021–22	Cal State Fullerton	21–11	11–4	2nd	NCAA Division I Round of 64
2022–23	Cal State Fullerton	20–13	12–6	4th	
2023–24	Cal State Fullerton	14–18	7–13	10th	
2024–25	Cal State Fullerton	6–26	1–19	11th	
2025–26	Cal State Fullerton	18–16	12–8	T–3rd	
2026–27	Cal State Fullerton	2–2	0–0		
Cal State Fullerton:		181–223 (.448)	94–123 (.433)		
Total:		181–223 (.448)			
National champion Postseason invitational champion Conference regular season champion Conference regular season and conference tournament champion Division regular season champion Division regular season and conference tournament champion Conference tournament champion
