= 2017–18 UC Riverside Highlanders men's basketball team =

American college basketball season

2017–18 UC Riverside Highlanders men's basketball
- Conference: Big West Conference
- Record: 9–22 (4–12 Big West)
- Head coach: Dennis Cutts (First 14 games); Justin Bell (interim)
- Assistant coaches: Keith Wilkinson; Byron Rimm II
- Home arena: Student Recreation Center Arena

2017–18 Big West men's basketball standings
| | Conf. | | | | Overall |
| Team | W | | L | PCT | W | | L | PCT |
|---|---|---|---|---|---|---|---|---|
| UC Davis | 12 | – | 4 | .750 | 22 | – | 11 | .667 |
| UC Santa Barbara | 11 | – | 5 | .688 | 23 | – | 9 | .719 |
| UC Irvine | 11 | – | 5 | .688 | 18 | – | 17 | .514 |
| Cal State Fullerton † | 10 | – | 6 | .625 | 20 | – | 12 | .625 |
| Long Beach State | 9 | – | 7 | .563 | 15 | – | 18 | .455 |
| Hawai'i | 8 | – | 8 | .500 | 17 | – | 13 | .567 |
| Cal Poly | 4 | – | 12 | .250 | 9 | – | 22 | .290 |
| UC Riverside | 4 | – | 12 | .250 | 9 | – | 22 | .290 |
| Cal State Northridge | 3 | – | 13 | .188 | 6 | – | 24 | .200 |
† 2018 Big West tournament winner

The 2017–18 UC Riverside Highlanders men's basketball team represented the University of California, Riverside during the 2017–18 NCAA Division I men's basketball season. The Highlanders, led by interim head coach Justin Bell, played their home games at the Student Recreation Center Arena in Riverside, California, as members of the Big West Conference. They finished the season 9–22, 4–12 in Big West play to finish in a tie for seventh place. As the No. 8 seed in the Big West tournament, they lost in the quarterfinals to UC Davis.

On January 1, 2018, three days before conference play was to start, head coach Dennis Cutts, who was in his fifth season at UC Riverside, was fired after posting a 5–9 record to start the season. Associate head coach Justin Bell was named interim head coach. On March 14, the school hired TCU assistant coach David Patrick as head coach.

== Previous season ==
The Highlanders finished the 2016–17 season 7–21, 5–11 in Big West play to finish in eighth place. As the No. 8 seed in the Big West tournament, they were defeated by UC Irvine in the quarterfinals.

== Offseason ==
=== Departures ===
| Name | Number | Pos. | Height | Weight | Year | Hometown | Reason for departure |
|---|---|---|---|---|---|---|---|
| Gentrey Thomas | 0 | G | 6'4" | 195 | Senior | East Preston, NS | Graduated |
| Malik Thames | 11 | G | 6'2" | 165 | Senior | Sacramento, CA | Graduated |
| Secean Johnson | 20 | F | 6'5" | 215 | Senior | Philadelphia, PA | Graduated |

=== Incoming transfers ===
| Name | Number | Pos. | Height | Weight | Year | Hometown | Previous school |
|---|---|---|---|---|---|---|---|
| Ryker Pierce | 31 | G/F | 6'5" | 205 | RS Sophomore | Rexburg, ID | Junior college transferred from Cowley CC |

=== 2017 incoming recruits ===
College recruiting information
| Name | Hometown | School | Height | Weight | Commit date |
|---|---|---|---|---|---|
| Alec Hickman; PG | San Juan Capistrano, CA | JSerra Catholic High School | 6 ft 4 in (1.93 m) | 170 lb (77 kg) | May 17, 2017 |
| Alec Hickman; PG | Recruit ratings: Scout: Rivals: (NR) | | | | |
| Ajani Kennedy; PF | Moreno Valley, CA | Rancho Verde High School | 6 ft 8 in (2.03 m) | 195 lb (88 kg) | Feb 2, 2017 |
| Ajani Kennedy; PF | Recruit ratings: Scout: Rivals: (NR) | | | | |
Overall recruit ranking:
Note: In many cases, Scout, Rivals, 247Sports, On3, and ESPN may conflict in their listings of height and weight.; In these cases, the average was taken. ESPN grades are on a 100-point scale.; Sources: "2017 Team Ranking". Rivals.

== Roster ==
2017–18 UC Riverside Highlanders men's basketball team
Players
Coaches

| Pos. | # | Name | Height | Weight | Year | Previous school | Hometown |
|---|---|---|---|---|---|---|---|
| G | 0 | Alec Hickman | 6 ft 4 in (1.93 m) | 180 lb (82 kg) | Fr | JSerra Catholic HS | Riverside, California |
| G | 1 | DJ Sylvester | 6 ft 3 in (1.91 m) | 185 lb (84 kg) | RS So | Morse HS | Victorville, California |
| G | 3 | Chance Murray | 6 ft 3 in (1.91 m) | 195 lb (88 kg) | RS Sr | Frederick K.C. Price III Schools; Arizona State | Los Angeles, California |
| G | 4 | Marcus Berkley | 6 ft 4 in (1.93 m) | 175 lb (79 kg) | RS Fr | Middlebrooks Academy | Garden Grove, California |
| G | 5 | Jayvon Brown | 6 ft 1 in (1.85 m) | 170 lb (77 kg) | RS Jr | King Drew HS; El Camino-Compton College | Los Angeles, California |
| F | 10 | Ajani Kennedy | 6 ft 8 in (2.03 m) | 200 lb (91 kg) | Fr | Rancho Verde HS | Moreno Valley, California |
| C | 12 | Idy Diallo | 6 ft 11 in (2.11 m) | 245 lb (111 kg) | RS Jr | Cathedral HS; Boston College | Dakar, Senegal |
| F | 13 | Eric Rwahwire | 6 ft 5 in (1.96 m) | 210 lb (95 kg) | RS So | Saddleback Valley Christian School | Toronto, Canada |
| F | 14 | Brandon Rosser | 6 ft 7 in (2.01 m) | 215 lb (98 kg) | RS Sr | Temecula Valley HS; Central Arizona College | Temecula, California |
| G | 15 | Dikymbe Martin | 6 ft 1 in (1.85 m) | 170 lb (77 kg) | So | John W. North HS | Riverside, California |
| F | 21 | Alex Larsson | 6 ft 10 in (2.08 m) | 260 lb (118 kg) | Sr | Södertälje Knights | Södertälje, Sweden |
| G | 22 | Dominick Pickett (W) | 6 ft 3 in (1.91 m) | 210 lb (95 kg) | RS Fr | Rancho Verde HS | Moreno Valley, California |
| G | 24 | Koh Flippin (W) | 6 ft 2 in (1.88 m) | 165 lb (75 kg) | Jr | North Torrance HS | Torrance, California |
| F | 25 | James Jackson (W) | 6 ft 8 in (2.03 m) | 235 lb (107 kg) | Sr | Monte Vista HS; Northwest Kansas Technical College | Spring Valley, California |
| G | 31 | Ryker Pierce | 6 ft 5 in (1.96 m) | 205 lb (93 kg) | RS Jr | Madison HS; Cowley College | Rexburg, Idaho |
| C | 32 | Menno Dijkstra | 7 ft 0 in (2.13 m) | 230 lb (104 kg) | Jr | Canarias Basketball Academy; Oakley College | Standdaarbuiten, Netherlands |

Head coach

- Justin Bell (UC Riverside)

Assistant coach(es)

- Keith Wilkinson (USC)
- Byron Rimm II (Cal State LA)

Legend

- (C) Team captain
- (S) Suspended
- (I) Ineligible
- (W) Walk-on
- Injured
- Current redshirt

Roster
Last update: November 21, 2017

== Schedule and results ==
| Date time, TV | Rank^{#} | Opponent^{#} | Result | Record | Site (attendance) city, state |
Quebec Tour
| Aug 2, 2017*; 4:00 pm | | at Université Laval | W 73–68 | 1–0 | Quebec City, QC |
| Aug 3, 2017*; 4:00 pm | | at UQAM | W 79–39 | 2–0 | Quebec City, QC |
| Aug 5, 2017*; 10:00 am | | at QC United | W 63–48 | 3–0 | Quebec City, QC |
Exhibition
| Nov 4, 2017*; 2:00 pm | | Stanislaus State | W 81–65 | | Student Recreation Center Arena; Riverside, CA |
Non-conference regular season
| Nov 10, 2017*; 9:00 pm, P12N | | at California | W 74–66 | 1–0 | Haas Pavilion (7,083); Berkeley, CA |
| Nov 15, 2017*; 7:00 pm | | at Loyola Marymount | L 64–76 | 1–1 | Gersten Pavilion (891); Los Angeles, CA |
| Nov 18, 2017*; 4:00 pm | | Portland State | L 82–94 | 1–2 | Student Recreation Center Arena; Riverside, CA |
| Nov 22, 2017*; 7:00 pm | | Western New Mexico | W 75–57 | 2–2 | Student Recreation Center Arena (363); Riverside, CA |
| Nov 26, 2017*; 1:00 pm, FS1 | | at Michigan | L 42–87 | 2–3 | Crisler Center (9,841); Ann Arbor, MI |
| Nov 30, 2017*; 7:00 pm | | Pacific | L 55–57 | 2–4 | Student Recreation Center Arena (372); Riverside, CA |
| Dec 2, 2017*; 6:00 pm, ESPN3 | | at Grand Canyon | L 56–68 | 2–5 | GCU Arena (6,844); Phoenix, AZ |
| Dec 5, 2017*; 7:00 pm | | at Pepperdine | L 59–70 | 2–6 | Firestone Fieldhouse (942); Malibu, CA |
| Dec 8, 2017*; 7:00 pm | | Air Force | W 67–48 | 3–6 | Student Recreation Center Arena (899); Riverside, CA |
| Dec 17, 2017*; 12:00 pm | | at Montana | L 61–77 | 3–7 | Dahlberg Arena (2,817); Missoula, MT |
| Dec 20, 2017*; 7:00 pm | | Valparaiso | W 73–60 | 4–7 | Student Recreation Center Arena (454); Riverside, CA |
| Dec 22, 2017*; 7:00 pm | | UC Merced | W 91–46 | 5–7 | Student Recreation Center Arena (460); Riverside, CA |
| Dec 28, 2017*; 6:00 pm | | at Utah Valley | L 82–90 | 5–8 | UCCU Center (2,936); Orem, UT |
| Dec 30, 2017*; 1:00 pm | | at Seattle | L 71–95 | 5–9 | Connolly Center (833); Seattle, WA |
Big West regular season
| Jan 3, 2018; 7:00 pm, ESPN3 | | at Cal State Fullerton | L 65–68 | 5–10 (0–1) | Titan Gym (878); Fullerton, CA |
| Jan 6, 2018; 9:00 pm, ESPNU | | at UC Santa Barbara | L 57–65 | 5–11 (0–2) | The Thunderdome (1,882); Santa Barbara, CA |
| Jan 11, 2018; 7:00 pm, ESPN3 | | UC Davis | L 65–75 | 5–12 (0–3) | Student Recreation Center Arena (870); Riverside, CA |
| Jan 13, 2018; 6:00 pm | | Long Beach State | L 68–75 | 5–13 (0–4) | Student Recreation Center Arena (567); Riverside, CA |
| Jan 17, 2018; 7:00 pm, ESPN3 | | Cal State Northridge | L 57–66 | 5–14 (0–5) | Student Recreation Center Arena (507); Riverside, CA |
| Jan 24, 2018; 7:00 pm, ESPN3 | | at UC Irvine | L 40–79 | 5–15 (0–6) | Bren Events Center (1,361); Irvine, CA |
| Jan 27, 2018; 5:00 pm, ESPN3 | | UC Santa Barbara | L 69–76 | 5–16 (0–7) | Student Recreation Center Arena (569); Riverside, CA |
| Jan 31, 2018; 7:00 pm | | at Cal Poly | L 68–71 | 5–17 (0–8) | Robert A. Mott Athletics Center (1,217); San Luis Obispo, CA |
| Feb 7, 2018; 9:00 pm | | at Hawaii | W 64–60 | 6–17 (1–8) | Stan Sheriff Center (5,206); Honolulu, HI |
| Feb 10, 2018; 5:00 pm | | UC Irvine | L 52–62 | 6–18 (1–9) | Student Recreation Center Arena (504); Riverside, CA |
| Feb 14, 2018; 6:00 pm, ESPN3 | | at Cal State Northridge | W 69–62 | 7–18 (2–9) | Matadome (615); Northridge, CA |
| Feb 17, 2018; 7:30 pm, Prime Ticket | | Hawaii | L 69–74 ^{OT} | 7–19 (2–10) | Student Recreation Center Arena (465); Riverside, CA |
| Feb 21, 2018; 7:00 pm | | Cal State Fullerton | W 69–65 | 8–19 (3–10) | Student Recreation Center Arena (582); Riverside, CA |
| Feb 24, 2018; 5:00 pm | | at UC Davis | L 63–64 | 8–20 (3–11) | The Pavilion (2,704); Davis, CA |
| Mar 1, 2018; 7:00 pm | | Cal Poly | W 72–63 | 9–20 (4–11) | Student Recreation Center Arena (350); Riverside, CA |
| Mar 3, 2018; 7:30 pm | | at Long Beach State | L 59–77 | 9–21 (4–12) | Walter Pyramid (2,930); Long Beach, CA |
Big West tournament
| Mar 8, 2018; 12:00 pm, FS West | (8) | vs. (1) UC Davis; Quarterfinals | L 66–70 | 9–22 | Honda Center; Anaheim, CA |
*Non-conference game. ^{#}Rankings from AP Poll. (#) Tournament seedings in parentheses. All times are in Pacific Time..
