= 2017–18 UC Santa Barbara Gauchos men's basketball team =

American college basketball season

2017–18 UC Santa Barbara Gauchos men's basketball

Legends Classic Subregional champion
- Conference: Big West Conference
- Record: 23–9 (11–5 Big West)
- Head coach: Joe Pasternack (1st season)
- Assistant coaches: John Rillie; Louis Reynaud; Ben Tucker
- Home arena: The Thunderdome

2017–18 Big West men's basketball standings
	Conf.				Overall
Team	W		L	PCT	W		L	PCT
UC Davis	12	–	4	.750	22	–	11	.667
UC Santa Barbara	11	–	5	.688	23	–	9	.719
UC Irvine	11	–	5	.688	18	–	17	.514
Cal State Fullerton †	10	–	6	.625	20	–	12	.625
Long Beach State	9	–	7	.563	15	–	18	.455
Hawai'i	8	–	8	.500	17	–	13	.567
Cal Poly	4	–	12	.250	9	–	22	.290
UC Riverside	4	–	12	.250	9	–	22	.290
Cal State Northridge	3	–	13	.188	6	–	24	.200
† 2018 Big West tournament winner

The 2017–18 UC Santa Barbara Gauchos men's basketball team represented the University of California, Santa Barbara during the 2017–18 NCAA Division I men's basketball season. The Gauchos, led by first-year head coach Joe Pasternack, played their home games at the UC Santa Barbara Events Center, better known as The Thunderdome, in Santa Barbara, California, as members of the Big West Conference. They finished the season 23–9, 11–5 in Big West play to finish in a tie for second place. As the No. 2 seed in the Big West tournament, they defeated Cal Poly before losing to UC Irvine in the semifinals. Despite winning 23 games, they did not participate in a postseason tournament.

== Previous season ==
The Gauchos finished the 2016–17 season 6–22, 4–12 in Big West play to finish in last place. As a result, they failed to quality for the Big West tournament.

== Offseason ==
=== Departures ===
Name	Number	Pos.	Height	Weight	Year	Hometown	Reason for departure
Eric Childress	1	G	6'0"	190	Senior	Hawthorne, CA	Graduated
Tide Osifeso	11	G	5'10"	155	Sophomore	Rancho Cucamonga, CA	Walk-on; left the team for personal reasons
Scotty Harris	34	G	6'5"	190	Freshman	Portola Valley, CA	Walk-on; left the team for personal reasons
Tyler Jackson	35	C	7'2"	284	RS Freshman	Oak Park, CA	Transferred to San Francisco State

=== Incoming transfers ===
Name	Number	Pos.	Height	Weight	Year	Hometown	Previous school
Leland King II	1	F	6'7"	215	RS Senior	Inglewood, CA	Transferred from Nevada. Will be eligible to play immediately since King II graduated from Nevada.
Marcus Jackson	55	G	6'3"	185	RS Senior	Acton, CA	Transferred from Rice. Will be eligible to play immediately since Jackson graduated from Rice.
Zack Moore		F	6'5"	200	Sophomore	Bellevue, WA	Transferred from Seattle. Under NCAA transfer rules, Moore will have to sit out for the 2017–18 season. Will have two years of remaining eligibility.
Devearl Ramsey		G	5'10"	170	Sophomore	Chatsworth, CA	Transferred from Nevada. Under NCAA transfer rules, Ramsey will have to sit out for the 2017–18 season. Will have three years of remaining eligibility.

=== 2017 incoming recruits ===
College recruiting information
Name	Hometown	School	Height	Weight	Commit date
Marcus Shaver #57 PG	Phoenix, AZ	Saint Mary's High School	6 ft 2 in (1.88 m)	170 lb (77 kg)	Aug 17, 2016
Marcus Shaver #57 PG	Recruit ratings: Scout: Rivals: (75)				
Overall recruit ranking:
Note: In many cases, Scout, Rivals, 247Sports, On3, and ESPN may conflict in their listings of height and weight.; In these cases, the average was taken. ESPN grades are on a 100-point scale.; Sources: "2017 Team Ranking". Rivals.

== Roster ==
2017–18 UC Santa Barbara Gauchos men's basketball team
Players
Coaches

Pos.	#	Name	Height	Weight	Year	Previous school	Hometown
F	0	Jarriesse Blackmon	6 ft 7 in (2.01 m)	211 lb (96 kg)	Jr	Layton HS	Layton, Utah
F	1	Leland King II	6 ft 7 in (2.01 m)	215 lb (98 kg)	RS Sr	Brentwood School; Nevada	Inglewood, California
G	2	Gabe Vincent	6 ft 3 in (1.91 m)	200 lb (91 kg)	Sr	St. Mary's HS	Stockton, California
G	3	Clifton Powell	6 ft 5 in (1.96 m)	171 lb (78 kg)	So	Village Christian Schools	Ladera Heights, California
F	5	Jalen Canty	6 ft 8 in (2.03 m)	245 lb (111 kg)	Sr	St. Patrick-St. Vincent HS; City College of San Francisco	Oakland, California
F	10	Maxwell Kupchak	6 ft 7 in (2.01 m)	201 lb (91 kg)	Jr	Brentwood School	Los Angeles, California
G	11	Brandon Davis	6 ft 2 in (1.88 m)	190 lb (86 kg)	Fr	Bishop Alemany HS	Mission Hills, California
F	12	Alex Hart	6 ft 10 in (2.08 m)	228 lb (103 kg)	RS Sr	Immaculata Regional HS	Kelowna, Canada
G	13	Sam Walters	6 ft 2 in (1.88 m)	188 lb (85 kg)	RS Jr	Soquel HS	Soquel, California
F	14	Ami Lakoju	6 ft 8 in (2.03 m)	273 lb (124 kg)	RS Jr	St. Luke's School (CT)	Harlem, New York
G	21	Max Heidegger	6 ft 2 in (1.88 m)	181 lb (82 kg)	So	Oaks Christian School	Malibu, California
G	23	Christian Terrell	6 ft 5 in (1.96 m)	195 lb (88 kg)	So	Sacramento Charter HS	Sacramento, California
F	40	Andrew Pickles (W)	6 ft 8 in (2.03 m)	225 lb (102 kg)	So	Mercer Island HS	Seattle, Washington
F	43	J.D. Slajchert (W)	6 ft 6 in (1.98 m)	227 lb (103 kg)	RS Jr	Phillips Exeter Academy	Oak Park, California
G	55	Marcus Jackson	6 ft 4 in (1.93 m)	185 lb (84 kg)	RS Sr	Pacific Hills School; Rice	Acton, California
G		Zack Moore (redshirt)	6 ft 5 in (1.96 m)	200 lb (91 kg)	Jr	Bellevue HS; Seattle	Bellevue, Washington
C		Devearl Ramsey (redshirt)	5 ft 10 in (1.78 m)	170 lb (77 kg)	So	Sierra Canyon School; Nevada	Los Angeles, California

Head coach

- Joe Pasternack (Indiana)

Assistant coach(es)

- John Rillie (Gonzaga)
- Louis Reynaud (San Francisco State)
- Ben Tucker (Arizona)

Legend

- (C) Team captain
- (S) Suspended
- (I) Ineligible
- (W) Walk-on
- Injured
- Current redshirt

Roster
Last update: November 23, 2017

== Schedule and results ==
Date time, TV	Rank^{#}	Opponent^{#}	Result	Record	Site (attendance) city, state
Exhibition
Nov 4, 2017*; 2:00 pm		Fresno Pacific	W 92–69		The Thunderdome (1,032); Santa Barbara, CA
Non-conference regular season
Nov 11, 2017*; 1:00 pm		North Dakota State	W 85–66	1–0	The Thunderdome (1,892); Santa Barbara, CA
Nov 15, 2017*; 4:00 pm, ACCN Extra		at Pittsburgh; Legends Classic campus site game	L 62–70	1–1	Petersen Events Center (2,685); Pittsburgh, PA
Nov 17, 2017*; 5:00 pm		at No. 16 Texas A&M; Legends Classic campus site game	L 65–84	1–2	Reed Arena (7,275); College Station, TX
Nov 20, 2017*; 7:30 pm		at Pepperdine; Legends Classic Sub Regional semifinals	W 92–84	2–2	Firestone Fieldhouse (1,682); Malibu, CA
Nov 21, 2017*; 5:00 pm		vs. Montana; Legends Classic Sub Regional finals	W 80–73	3–2	Firestone Fieldhouse (1,239); Malibu, CA
Nov 24, 2017*; 7:00 pm		Prairie View A&M	W 69–66	4–2	The Thunderdome (1,012); Santa Barbara, CA
Nov 28, 2017*; 7:00 pm		at San Francisco	W 79–72	5–2	War Memorial Gymnasium (1,720); San Francisco, CA
Dec 2, 2017*; 7:00 pm		San Diego	W 67–57	6–2	The Thunderdome (1,716); Santa Barbara, CA
Dec 5, 2017*; 7:00 pm		Omaha	W 77–70	7–2	The Thunderdome (1,322); Santa Barbara, CA
Dec 9, 2017*; 1:00 pm		at Montana State	W 91–69	8–2	Brick Breeden Fieldhouse (2,271); Bozeman, MT
Dec 17, 2017*; 5:00 pm, P12N		at USC	L 87–98	8–3	Galen Center (3,519); Los Angeles, CA
Dec 19, 2017*; 7:00 pm		San Diego Christian	W 87–69	9–3	The Thunderdome (1,271); Santa Barbara, CA
Dec 23, 2017*; 7:05 pm		at Sacramento State	W 82–72	10–3	Hornets Nest (802); Sacramento, CA
Dec 30, 2017*; 7:00 pm		Pacific Union	W 81–49	11–3	The Thunderdome (1,101); Santa Barbara, CA
Big West regular season
Jan 4, 2018; 7:00 pm		at Cal Poly; Blue–Green Rivalry	L 79–80	11–4 (0–1)	Robert A. Mott Athletics Center (2,631); San Luis Obispo, CA
Jan 6, 2018; 9:00 pm, ESPNU		UC Riverside	W 65–57	12–4 (1–1)	The Thunderdome (1,882); Santa Barbara, CA
Jan 13, 2018; 10:00 pm		at Hawaii	L 76–77	12–5 (1–2)	Stan Sheriff Center (5,719); Honolulu, HI
Jan 17, 2018; 7:00 pm		Cal State Fullerton	W 83–64	13–5 (2–2)	The Thunderdome (1,714); Santa Barbara, CA
Jan 20, 2018; 9:00 pm, ESPNU		UC Irvine	W 70–58	14–5 (3–2)	The Thunderdome (3,823); Santa Barbara, CA
Jan 25, 2018; 7:30 pm, FS West		at Cal State Fullerton	W 70–65	15–5 (4–2)	Titan Gym (1,033); Fullerton, CA
Jan 27, 2018; 5:00 pm, ESPN3		at UC Riverside	W 76–69	16–5 (5–2)	Student Recreation Center Arena (569); Riverside, CA
Feb 1, 2018; 7:00 pm		Hawaii	W 84–82 ^{OT}	17–5 (6–2)	The Thunderdome (2,317); Santa Barbara, CA
Feb 3, 2018; 7:00 pm		Cal State Northridge	W 75–51	18–5 (7–2)	The Thunderdome (2,229); Santa Barbara, CA
Feb 8, 2018; 7:00 pm		at UC Davis	W 90–81	19–5 (8–2)	The Pavilion (3,392); Davis, CA
Feb 15, 2018; 6:00 pm		at Long Beach State	W 80–70	20–5 (9–2)	Walter Pyramid (3,015); Long Beach, CA
Feb 17, 2018; 2:00 pm		UC Davis	L 54–71	20–6 (9–3)	The Thunderdome (2,883); Santa Barbara, CA
Feb 22, 2018; 7:30 pm, Prime Ticket		at UC Irvine	L 49–69	20–7 (9–4)	Bren Events Center (2,318); Irvine, CA
Feb 24, 2018; 5:00 pm, ESPN3		Cal State Northridge	W 82–73	21–7 (10–4)	Matadome (1,122); Northridge, CA
Mar 1, 2018; 7:00 pm, ESPNU		Long Beach State	L 69–70	21–8 (10–5)	The Thunderdome (1,743); Santa Barbara, CA
Mar 3, 2018; 7:00 pm		Cal Poly; Blue–Green Rivalry	W 86–61	22–8 (11–5)	The Thunderdome (4,823); Santa Barbara, CA
Big West tournament
Mar 8, 2018; 10:30 pm, FS West	(2)	vs. (7) Cal Poly; Quarterfinals	W 75–53	23–8	Honda Center (3,311); Anaheim, CA
Mar 9, 2018; 10:30 pm, ESPNU	(2)	vs. (3) UC Irvine; Semifinals	L 58–61	23–9	Honda Center (3,984); Anaheim, CA
*Non-conference game. ^{#}Rankings from AP Poll. (#) Tournament seedings in parentheses. All times are in Pacific Time..
