= 2017–18 UC Irvine Anteaters men's basketball team =

American college basketball season

2017–18 UC Irvine Anteaters men's basketball
- Conference: Big West Conference
- Record: 18–17 (11–5 Big West)
- Head coach: Russell Turner (8th season)
- Assistant coaches: Blaine Taylor; Ryan Badrtalei; Michael Wilder
- Home arena: Bren Events Center

2017–18 Big West men's basketball standings
	Conf.				Overall
Team	W		L	PCT	W		L	PCT
UC Davis	12	–	4	.750	22	–	11	.667
UC Santa Barbara	11	–	5	.688	23	–	9	.719
UC Irvine	11	–	5	.688	18	–	17	.514
Cal State Fullerton †	10	–	6	.625	20	–	12	.625
Long Beach State	9	–	7	.563	15	–	18	.455
Hawai'i	8	–	8	.500	17	–	13	.567
Cal Poly	4	–	12	.250	9	–	22	.290
UC Riverside	4	–	12	.250	9	–	22	.290
Cal State Northridge	3	–	13	.188	6	–	24	.200
† 2018 Big West tournament winner

The 2017–18 UC Irvine Anteaters men's basketball team represented the University of California, Irvine during the 2017–18 NCAA Division I men's basketball season. The Anteaters were led by eighth-year head coach Russell Turner and played their home games at the Bren Events Center as members of the Big West Conference. They finished the season 18–17, 11–5 in Big West play, to finish in a tie for second place. As the No. 3 seed in the Big West tournament, they defeated Hawaii and UC Santa Barbara before losing to Cal State Fullerton in the championship game.

== Previous season ==
The Anteaters finished the 2016–17 season 21–15, 12–4 in Big West play to win the regular season Big West championship, the school's fifth regular season title. They defeated UC Riverside in the quarterfinals of the Big West tournament and the Long Beach State in the semifinals before falling to UC Davis in the championship game. As a regular season champion who did not win their conference tournament, the Anteaters received an automatic bid to the National Invitation Tournament as a No. 8 seed. There, they lost to No. 1 seed Illinois State in the first round. The season marked the school's fifth straight season with at least 20 wins.

== Offseason ==
=== Departures ===
Name	Number	Pos.	Height	Weight	Year	Hometown	Reason for departure
Jaron Martin	0	G	5'10"	170	Senior	Sunland, CA	Graduated
Luke Nelson	10	G	6'3"	190	Senior	Worthing, England	Graduated
Ioannis Dimakopoulos	12	C	7'2"	255	Senior	Patras, Greece	Graduated
Adam Liberman	32	C	6'10"	240	Freshman	Valley Village, CA	Walk-on; did not return

=== 2017 recruiting class ===
College recruiting information
Name	Hometown	School	Height	Weight	Commit date
Solomon Ruddell #64 C	Morro Bay, CA	The Hill School	7 ft 1 in (2.16 m)	235 lb (107 kg)	
Solomon Ruddell #64 C	Recruit ratings: Rivals: 247Sports: ESPN: (69)				
Collin Welp #95 PF	Seattle, WA	Seattle Prep	7 ft 1 in (2.16 m)	235 lb (107 kg)	
Collin Welp #95 PF	Recruit ratings: Rivals: 247Sports: ESPN: (63)				
Overall recruit ranking: Scout: n/a Rivals: n/a ESPN: n/a
Note: In many cases, Scout, Rivals, 247Sports, On3, and ESPN may conflict in their listings of height and weight.; In these cases, the average was taken. ESPN grades are on a 100-point scale.; Sources: "ESPN – UC Irvine Basketball Recruiting 2017". ESPN.; "2017 Team Ranking". Rivals.

== Roster ==
2017–18 UC Irvine Anteaters men's basketball team
Players
Coaches

Pos.	#	Name	Height	Weight	Year	Hometown
G	2	Max Hazzard	5 ft 10 in (1.78 m)	170 lb (77 kg)	RS So	Los Angeles, CA
G	4	Justin Wertner	6 ft 4 in (1.93 m)	203 lb (92 kg)	RS Fr	Memphis, TN
F	5	Jonathan Galloway	6 ft 10 in (2.08 m)	235 lb (107 kg)	Jr	Brentwood (Los Angeles), CA
F	11	John Edgar Jr. (W)	6 ft 5 in (1.96 m)	217 lb (98 kg)	So	Chino Hills, CA
F	13	Brandon Smith	6 ft 5 in (1.96 m)	190 lb (86 kg)	Jr	Santa Ana, CA
G	14	Evan Leonard	6 ft 1 in (1.85 m)	190 lb (86 kg)	So	Cerritos, CA
G	22	Teo Davidian (W)	6 ft 1 in (1.85 m)	180 lb (82 kg)	Sr	Glendale, CA
G	23	Darrian Traylor	6 ft 4 in (1.93 m)	210 lb (95 kg)	RS So	Las Vegas, NV
G	24	Eyassu Worku	6 ft 2 in (1.88 m)	170 lb (77 kg)	Fr	Artesia, CA
G	25	Spencer Rivers (W)	6 ft 2 in (1.88 m)	200 lb (91 kg)	Jr	Winter Park, FL
C	35	Soloman Ruddell	7 ft 1 in (2.16 m)	255 lb (116 kg)	Fr	Los Osos, CA
F	40	Collin Welp	6 ft 9 in (2.06 m)	235 lb (107 kg)	Fr	Seattle, WA
F	42	Tommy Rutherford	6 ft 8 in (2.03 m)	220 lb (100 kg)	So	El Cajon, CA
G	43	Riley Welch (W)	6 ft 0 in (1.83 m)	185 lb (84 kg)	Fr	Los Angeles, CA
F	50	Elston Jones	6 ft 9 in (2.06 m)	275 lb (125 kg)	RS Jr	Goodyear, AZ
C	55	Brad Greene	6 ft 10 in (2.08 m)	320 lb (145 kg)	So	Lone Pine, CA

Head coach

- Russell Turner (Hampden–Sydney)

Assistant coach(es)

- Blaine Taylor (Montana)
- Ryan Badrtalei (UCLA)
- Michael Wilder (UC Irvine)

Legend

- (C) Team captain
- (S) Suspended
- (I) Ineligible
- (W) Walk-on
- Injured
- Current redshirt

Roster
Last update: March 27, 2024

== Schedule and results ==
Date time, TV	Rank^{#}	Opponent^{#}	Result	Record	Site (attendance) city, state
Exhibition
Nov 3, 2017*; 7:00 pm, Big West TV		Alaska Anchorage	W 73–66		Bren Events Center (3,035); Irvine, CA
Non-conference regular season
Nov 10, 2017*; 6:15 pm		at South Dakota State	L 54–65	0–1	Frost Arena (2,669); Brookings, SD
Nov 12, 2017*; 3:00 pm, Altitude		at Denver	W 83–69	1–1	Magness Arena (1,202); Denver, CO
Nov 14, 2017*; 7:00 pm, Big West TV		Chapman	W 91–52	2–1	Bren Events Center (1,241); Irvine, CA
Nov 17, 2017*; 6:00 pm, ESPN3		at Kansas State; Las Vegas Invitational	L 49–71	2–2	Bramlage Coliseum (6,451); Manhattan, KS
Nov 19, 2017*; 11:00 am, P12N		at Arizona State; Las Vegas Invitational	L 78–99	2–3	Wells Fargo Arena (5,394); Tempe, AZ
Nov 23, 2017*; 7:00 pm		vs. Rider; Las Vegas Invitational	L 82–90	2–4	Orleans Arena (3,245); Paradise, NV
Nov 24, 2017*; 11:00 am		vs. Northern Arizona; Las Vegas Invitational	W 77–71	3–4	Orleans Arena (3,325); Paradise, NV
Nov 26, 2017*; 3:00 pm, P12N		at No. 23 UCLA	L 63–87	3–5	Pauley Pavilion (8,329); Los Angeles, CA
Nov 29, 2017*; 7:00 pm, Big West TV		Whittier	W 112–65	4–5	Bren Events Center (1,050); Irvine, CA
Dec 2, 2017*; 7:00 pm, Big West TV		Nevada	L 65–76	4–6	Bren Events Center (1,869); Irvine, CA
Dec 6, 2017*; 6:00 pm, MWN		at Utah State	L 59–62	4–7	Smith Spectrum (5,443); Logan, UT
Dec 9, 2017*; 6:00 pm, WAC Digital		at UTRGV	L 59–73	4–8	UTRGV Fieldhouse (602); Edinburg, TX
Dec 16, 2018*; 5:00 pm, W.TV		at Saint Mary's	L 66–73	4–9	McKeon Pavilion (2,809); Moraga, CA
Dec 19, 2017*; 6:00 pm, Big Sky TV/Pluto TV		at Montana	L 68–86	4–10	Dahlberg Arena (3,106); Missoula, MT
Dec 21, 2017*; 6:30 pm, Big Sky TV/Pluto TV		vs. Idaho; Boise Showcase	W 67–59	5–10	CenturyLink Arena (4,096); Boise, ID
Dec 28, 2017*; 7:00 pm, Big West TV		New Mexico State	L 60–65	5–11	Bren Events Center (2,036); Irvine, CA
Big West regular season
Jan 4, 2018; 7:00 pm, Big West TV		at UC Davis	L 53–64	5–12 (0–1)	The Pavilion (1,203); Davis, CA
Jan 6, 2018; 7:00 pm, Big West TV		Long Beach State; Black & Blue Rivalry	W 86–73	6–12 (1–1)	Bren Events Center (1,723); Irvine, CA
Jan 11, 2018; 7:30 pm, FS West		Cal State Fullerton	L 64–67	6–13 (1–2)	Bren Events Center (1,484); Irvine, CA
Jan 13, 2018; 7:00 pm, Big West TV		at Cal State Northridge	W 71–54	7–13 (2–2)	Matadome (559); Northridge, CA
Jan 18, 2018; 7:00 pm, ESPN3		Cal Poly	W 80–73	8–13 (3–2)	Bren Events Center (1,429); Irvine, CA
Jan 20, 2018; 9:00 pm, ESPNU		at UC Santa Barbara	L 58–70	8–14 (3–3)	The Thunderdome (3,823); Santa Barbara, CA
Jan 24, 2018; 7:00 pm, ESPN3		UC Riverside	W 79–40	9–14 (4–3)	Bren Events Center (1,361); Irvine, CA
Jan 31, 2018; 7:30 pm, FS Prime Ticket		at Long Beach State; Black & Blue Rivalry	W 75–68	10–14 (5–3)	Walter Pyramid (2,833); Long Beach, CA
Feb 3, 2018; 7:00 pm, ESPNU		at Cal State Fullerton	W 63–25	11–14 (6–3)	Titan Gym (1,506); Fullerton, CA
Feb 7, 2018; 7:00 pm, ESPN3		Cal State Northridge	W 77–56	12–14 (7–3)	Bren Events Center (1,198); Irvine, CA
Feb 10, 2018; 5:00 pm, Big West TV		at UC Riverside	W 62–52	13–14 (8–3)	The SRC (504); Riverside, CA
Feb 15, 2018; 8:00 pm, ESPN3		Hawaii	L 61–62	13–15 (8–4)	Bren Events Center (1,424); Irvine, CA
Feb 17, 2018; 7:00 pm, Big West TV		at Cal Poly	W 75–58	14–15 (9–4)	Mott Gym (2,403); San Luis Obispo, CA
Feb 22, 2018; 7:30 pm, FS Prime Ticket		UC Santa Barbara; Homecoming	W 69–49	15–15 (10–4)	Bren Events Center (2,318); Irvine, CA
Feb 24, 2018; 10:00 pm, Spectrum Sports HI		at Hawaii	W 66–57	16–15 (11–4)	Stan Sheriff Center (7,353); Honolulu, HI
Mar 3, 2018; 7:30 pm, ESPN3		UC Davis	L 84–90 ^{OT2}	16–16 (11–5)	Bren Events Center (5,000); Irvine, CA
Big West tournament
Mar 8, 2018; 6:00 pm, FS West/Prime Ticket	(3)	vs. (6) Hawaii; Quarterfinals	W 68–67	17–16	Honda Center (3,311); Anaheim, CA
Mar 9, 2018; 9:30 pm, ESPNU	(3)	vs. (2) UC Santa Barbara; Quarterfinals	W 61–58	18–16	Honda Center (3,984); Anaheim, CA
Mar 10, 2018; 9:00 pm, ESPN2	(3)	vs. (4) Cal State Fullerton; Championship game	L 55–71	18–17	Honda Center (5,664); Anaheim, CA
*Non-conference game. ^{#}Rankings from AP poll. (#) Tournament seedings in parentheses. All times are in Pacific Time.
