= UC Riverside Highlanders men's basketball statistical leaders =

The UC Riverside Highlanders men's basketball statistical leaders are individual statistical leaders of the UC Riverside Highlanders men's basketball program in various categories, including points, assists, blocks, rebounds, and steals. Within those areas, the lists identify single-game, single-season, and career leaders. The Highlanders represent the University of California, Riverside in the NCAA's Big West Conference.

UC Riverside began competing in intercollegiate basketball in 1954. The NCAA did not officially record assists as a stat until the 1983–84 season, and blocks and steals until the 1985–86 season, but UC Riverside's record books include players in these stats before these seasons. These lists are updated through the end of the 2020–21 season.

== Scoring ==
Career
Rk	Player	Points	Seasons
1	Larry Cunningham	1,502	2004–05 2005–06 2006–07 2007–08
2	Howard Lee	1,386	1969–70 1970–71 1971–72
3	Taylor Johns	1,383	2012–13 2013–14 2014–15 2015–16
4	Dikymbe Martin	1,315	2016–17 2017–18 2018–19 2019–20
5	Zyon Pullin	1,312	2019–20 2020–21 2021–22 2022–23
6	Bobby Walters	1,280	1971–72 1972–73 1973–74
7	Dave Roberts	1,142	1964–65 1965–66 1966–67
8	James King	1,126	1994–95 1995–96 1996–97
9	Carl Rodwell	1,116	1965–66 1966–67 1967–68 1968–69
10	Barrington Hargress	1,114	2023–24 2024–25

Season
Rk	Player	Points	Season
1	Barrington Hargress	686	2024–25
2	Maurice Pullum	632	1988–89
3	Mike Washington	611	1969–70
4	Howard Lee	605	1969–70
5	Andrew Henderson	579	2025–26
6	Bob Gray	573	1967–68
7	Bob Fife	538	1993–94
8	Dick Barton	536	1968–69
9	Robert Jimerson	535	1986–87
10	Chris Ceballos	531	1989–90
	Zyon Pullin	531	2022–23

Single game
Rk	Player	Points	Season	Opponent
1	Dick Barton	42	1968–69	La Verna
2	Rickey Porter	40	2005–06	Pacific
	Barrington Hargress	40	2024–25	UC San Diego
4	Kyle Austin	39	2009–10	Cal Poly
	Andrew Henderson	39	2025–26	Cal Poly
6	Carl Rodwell	38	1965–66	Southern California College
	Marqui Worthy Jr.	36	2025–26	Cal State Northridge
8	Chris Patton	36	2012–13	Cal State Fullerton
	Dick Barton	36	1968–69	UC San Diego
	Marqui Worthy Jr.	36	2025–26	Cal State Northridge

== Rebounds ==
Career
Rk	Player	Rebounds	Seasons
1	Howard Lee	1,004	1969–70 1970–71 1971–72
2	Taylor Johns	773	2012–13 2013–14 2014–15 2015–16
3	Sam Cash	745	1970–71 1971–72
4	Tim Bell	742	1980–81 1981–82 1982–83 1983–84
5	Vili Morton	705	2000–01 2001–02 2003–04 2004–05
6	Carl Rodwell	661	1965–66 1966–67 1967–68 1968–69
7	Erik Kennady	595	1994–95 1995–96 1996–97 1997–98
8	Callum McRae	572	2018–19 2019–20 2021–22
9	Darrell Daniel	561	1969–70 1970–71
10	Alex Larsson	553	2014–15 2015–16 2016–17 2017–18

Season
Rk	Player	Rebounds	Season
1	Sam Cash	428	1971–72
2	Howard Lee	377	1969–70
3	Lee McDougal	376	1972–73
4	Darrell Daniel	345	1969–70
5	Howard Lee	333	1971–72
6	Sam Cash	317	1970–71
7	Dick Barton	308	1968–69
8	Robert Jimerson	300	1986–87
9	Howard Lee	294	1970–71
10	Bob Fife	287	1993–94

Single game
Rk	Player	Rebounds	Season	Opponent
1	Sam Cash	28	1971–72	Cal State Fullerton
2	Sam Cash	24	1970–71	Cal State Fullerton
	Bob Wills	24	1958–59	Cal Baptist
4	Sam Cash	23	1971–72	Arizona State
5	Sam Cash	22	1970–71	Cal Poly Pomona
	Sam Cash	22	1971–72	UC Irvine
	Paul Hoffman	22	1966–67	Azusa Pacific
	Bob Wills	22	1958–59	Cal Tech

== Assists ==
Career
Rk	Player	Assists	Seasons
1	Reggie Mims	403	1972–73 1973–74 1974–75 1975–76
2	Zyon Pullin	394	2019–20 2020–21 2021–22 2022–23
3	Reggie Howard	361	1985–86 1987–88 1988–89 1989–90
4	Marcellus Smith	345	1989–90 1990–91 1991–92 1993–94
5	Tim Bell	291	1980–81 1981–82 1982–83 1983–84
	Brad Husen	291	1984–85 1985–86
	Barrington Hargress	291	2023–24 2024–25
8	William Wilson	286	1990–91 1992–93 1993–94 1994–95
9	Gary Pickens	268	1978–79 1979–80
	Dikymbe Martin	268	2016–17 2017–18 2018–19 2019–20

Season
Rk	Player	Assists	Season
1	Brad Husen	203	1985–86
2	Mike Reid	200	1971–72
3	Sonny Festejo	190	1968–69
4	Reggie Howard	158	1989–90
5	Barrington Hargress	154	2023–24
6	Gary Pickens	144	1979–80
7	Chris Jackson	140	1988–89
	Mike Washington	140	1969–70
9	K.J. Roberts	138	1995–96
10	Barrington Hargress	137	2024–25

Single game
Rk	Player	Assists	Season	Opponent
1	Reggie Mims	16	1975–76	Portland State
2	Reggie Howard	15	1989–90	Cal State Northridge
	Mike Reid	15	1971–72	Cal State Fullerton
4	Mike Washington	13	1970–71	Cal State Fullerton
	Sonny Festejo	13	1968–69	Pasadena
	Sonny Festejo	13	1967–68	Pasadena

== Steals ==
Career
Rk	Player	Steals	Seasons
1	William Wilson	199	1990–91 1992–93 1993–94 1994–95
2	Chris Hantgin	140	1990–91 1991–92 1992–93
3	Chris Jackson	127	1987–88 1988–89
4	Brad Husen	123	1984–85 1985–86
	Larry Cunningham	123	2004–05 2005–06 2006–07 2007–08
6	Dominick Pickett	118	2017–18 2018–19 2019–20 2020–21 2021–22
7	Dikymbe Martin	115	2016–17 2017–18 2018–19 2019–20
8	Vince Cason	107	1980–81 1981–82 1982–83 1983–84
9	Mike Washington	104	1969–70 1970–71
10	Kevin Butler	103	2000–01 2001–02 2002–03 2003–04

Season
Rk	Player	Steals	Season
1	Mike Washington	104	1969–70
2	John Masi	78	1969–70
3	William Wilson	75	1994–95
4	Chris Jackson	64	1988–89
	Brad Husen	64	1984–85
6	Anthony Jenkins	63	1990–91
	Chris Jackson	63	1987–88
8	Brad Husen	59	1985–86
	William Wilson	59	1992–93
10	K.J. Roberts	58	1995–96

Single game
Rk	Player	Steals	Season	Opponent
1	Chris Harriel	7	2012–13	Northern Colorado
2	Dikymbe Martin	6	2016–17	Hawai'i
	Dominick Pickett	6	2020–21	Hawai'i

== Blocks ==
Career
Rk	Player	Blocks	Seasons
1	Taylor Johns	182	2012–13 2013–14 2014–15 2015–16
2	Vili Morton	174	2000–01 2001–02 2003–04 2004–05
3	Tim Bell	131	1980–81 1981–82 1982–83 1983–84
4	BJ Shearry	103	2010–11 2011–12
5	Bob Fife	89	1993–94
6	Alex Larsson	70	2014–15 2015–16 2016–17 2017–18
7	Erik Kennady	69	1994–95 1995–96 1996–97 1997–98
8	Menno Dijkstra	65	2015–16 2016–17 2017–18 2018–19
9	Sam Cash	64	1970–71 1971–72
10	Robert Jimerson	63	1982–83 1985–86 1986–87

Season
Rk	Player	Blocks	Season
1	Bob Fife	89	1993–94
2	Vili Morton	83	2001–02
3	Taylor Johns	72	2013–14
4	Sam Cash	64	1971–72
5	BJ Shearry	55	2011–12
6	Taylor Johns	52	2014–15
	BJ Shearry	48	2010–11
8	Tim Bell	46	1982–83
	Vili Morton	42	2003–04
10	Craig Fuller	41	1985–86
	BJ Kolly	41	2025–26

Single game
Rk	Player	Blocks	Season	Opponent
1	BJ Shearry	7	2011–12	Long Beach State
	Vili Morton	7	2001–02	Sacramento State
	Bob Fife	7	1993–94	Cal State San Bernardino
4	Joel Armotrading	6	2024–25	Cal State Northridge
	Alex Larsson	6	2015–16	Hawai'i
	Taylor Johns	6	2013–14	Hawai'i
	BJ Shearry	6	2010–11	Long Beach State
	Vili Morton	6	2001–02	Cal State Fullerton
	Bob Fife	6	1993–94	Cal Poly Pomona
	Bob Fife	6	1993–94	Cal Poly
	Bob Fife	6	1993–94	College of Notre Dame
	Dave Gray	6	1966–67	Cal Western
