= 2016–17 Cal State Fullerton Titans men's basketball team =

American college basketball season

2016–17 Cal State Fullerton Titans men's basketball

CIT, First Round
- Conference: Big West Conference
- Record: 17–15 (10–6 Big West)
- Head coach: Dedrique Taylor (4th season)
- Assistant coaches: John Smith; Danny Sprinkle; Joe Harge
- Home arena: Titan Gym

2016–17 Big West men's basketball standings
	Conf.				Overall
Team	W		L	PCT	W		L	PCT
UC Irvine	12	–	4	.750	21	–	15	.583
UC Davis †	11	–	5	.688	23	–	13	.639
Cal State Fullerton	10	–	6	.625	17	–	15	.531
Long Beach State	9	–	7	.563	15	–	19	.441
Hawai'i	8	–	8	.500	14	–	16	.467
Cal State Northridge	7	–	9	.438	11	–	19	.367
Cal Poly	6	–	10	.375	11	–	20	.355
UC Riverside	5	–	11	.313	7	–	21	.250
UC Santa Barbara	4	–	12	.250	6	–	22	.214
† 2017 Big West tournament winner

The 2016–17 Cal State Fullerton Titans men's basketball team represented California State University, Fullerton during the 2016–17 NCAA Division I men's basketball season. The Titans, led by fourth-year head coach Dedrique Taylor, played their home games at Titan Gym as members of the Big West Conference. They finished the season 17–15, 10–6 in Big West play to finish in third place. They defeated Cal State Northridge in the quarterfinals of the Big West tournament to advance to the semifinals, where they lost to UC Davis. They were invited to the CollegeInsider.com Tournament, where they lost in the first round to Weber State.

== Previous season ==
The Titans finished the season 10–20, 3–13 in Big West play to finish in last place. They lost in the quarterfinals of the Big West tournament to Hawaii.

== Departures ==
Name	Number	Pos.	Height	Weight	Year	Hometown	Reason for departure
Tim Myles	3	F	6'6"	230	Junior	Rancho Cucamonga, CA	Walk-on; didn't return
Malcolm Henderson	5	G	6'8"	250	RS senior	Montreal, QE	Graduated
Lanerryl Johnson	10	G	6'1"	165	RS senior	Atlanta, GA	Graduated
Malcolm Brooks	11	G	6'5"	185	RS senior	Brooklyn, NY	Graduated
Jamar Akoh	15	F	6'7"	240	Sophomore	Rancho Cucamonga, CA	Transferred to Montana
Sheldon Blackwell	22	G	6'5"	175	Junior	Rancho Cucamonga, CA	Transferred to Antelope Valley
Rashard Todd	23	F	6'7"	200	RS junior	Baltimore, MD	Transferred to Coppin State
Keilan Horton	24	G	6'0"	180	Junior	Los Angeles, CA	Walk-on; left the team for personal reasons
Kennedy Esume	33	C	6'10"	245	Senior	Umuaka, Nigeria	Graduated

=== Incoming transfers ===
Name	Number	Pos.	Height	Weight	Year	Hometown	Notes
Arkim Robertson	13	F	6'9"		Junior	St. George's, Grenada	Junior college transferred from Western Oklahoma State College
Richard Peters	22	C	6'11"	275	RS senior	Pickering, ON	Transferred from Albany. Was eligible to play since he graduated from Albany.
Darcy Malone	33	C	7'0"	246	Senior	Canberra, Australia	Transferred from LSU. Was eligible to play since he graduated from LSU.
Jhan Paul Mejia	41	F	6'10"		Junior	Madrid, Spain	Junior college transferred from Northeastern Oklahoma A&M College

== 2016 incoming recruits ==
College recruiting
Name	Hometown	School	Height	Weight	Commit date
Dwight Ramos; SF	Walnut, CA	Walnut High School	6 ft 5 in (1.96 m)	190 lb (86 kg)	Feb 21, 2016
Dwight Ramos; SF	Recruit ratings: Scout: Rivals: (64)				
Austen Awosika; PG	Chino Hills, CA	Ayala High School	6 ft 2 in (1.88 m)	170 lb (77 kg)	
Austen Awosika; PG	Recruit ratings: Scout: Rivals: (62)				
Davon Clare; SF	Harker Heights, TX	Harker Heights High School	6 ft 6 in (1.98 m)	N/A	
Davon Clare; SF	Recruit ratings: Scout: Rivals: (NR)				
Jackson Rowe; PF	Mississauga, ON	Wasatch Academy	6 ft 7 in (2.01 m)	210 lb (95 kg)	
Jackson Rowe; PF	Recruit ratings: Scout: Rivals: (NR)				
Overall recruit ranking:
Note: In many cases, Scout, Rivals, 247Sports, On3, and ESPN may conflict in their listings of height and weight.; In these cases, the average was taken. ESPN grades are on a 100-point scale.; Sources: "2016 Team Ranking". Rivals.

=== 2017 incoming recruits ===
College recruiting (2017)
Name	Hometown	School	Height	Weight	Commit date
Landon Kirkwood; SG	Brooklyn Center High School	Brooklyn Center, MN	6 ft 3 in (1.91 m)	N/A	Dec 16, 2015
Landon Kirkwood; SG	Recruit ratings: Scout: Rivals: (NR)				
Daniel Venzant; PG	Midland, TX	Midland Christian School	5 ft 9 in (1.75 m)	N/A	
Daniel Venzant; PG	Recruit ratings: Scout: Rivals: (NR)				
Overall recruit ranking:
Note: In many cases, Scout, Rivals, 247Sports, On3, and ESPN may conflict in their listings of height and weight.; In these cases, the average was taken. ESPN grades are on a 100-point scale.; Sources: "2017 Team Ranking". Rivals.

== Roster ==
2016–17 Cal State Fullerton Titans men's basketball team
Players
Coaches

Pos.	#	Name	Height	Weight	Year	Previous school	Hometown
G	0	Kyle Allman Jr.	6 ft 3 in (1.91 m)	175 lb (79 kg)	So	HSCTEA	Brooklyn, NY
G	1	Tre Coggins	6 ft 3 in (1.91 m)	193 lb (88 kg)	Sr	JSerra Catholic HS; Air Force	San Juan Capistrano, CA
G	2	Lionheart Leslie	5 ft 10 in (1.78 m)	179 lb (81 kg)	Sr	Vanderbilt HS; Blinn JC	Houma, LA
F	5	Davon Clare	6 ft 5 in (1.96 m)	205 lb (93 kg)	Fr	Harker Heights HS	Killeen, TX
G	10	Austen Awosika	6 ft 3 in (1.91 m)	175 lb (79 kg)	Fr	Ayala HS	Chino Hills, CA
G	11	Loren Brill (W)	6 ft 0 in (1.83 m)	180 lb (82 kg)	Fr	Georgetown Prep	Gaithersburg, MD
G	12	Jamal Smith (W)	6 ft 3 in (1.91 m)	170 lb (77 kg)	RS Fr	Rancho Verde HS	Moreno Valley, CA
F	13	Arkim Robertson	6 ft 9 in (2.06 m)	240 lb (109 kg)	Jr	St. John’s Christian; Western Oklahoma State College	St. John's, Grenada
F	14	Khalil Ahmad	6 ft 4 in (1.93 m)	185 lb (84 kg)	So	Centennial HS	Corona, CA
G	15	Jose Garcia Gonzalez (W)	6 ft 3 in (1.91 m)	185 lb (84 kg)	Fr	Los Alamitos HS	Los Alamitos, CA
C	22	Richard Peters	6 ft 11 in (2.11 m)	270 lb (122 kg)	Sr	Westwind Prep; Albany	Pickering, ON
G	23	Dwight Ramos	6 ft 5 in (1.96 m)	190 lb (86 kg)	Fr	Walnut HS	West Covina, CA
C	32	Joshua Currenton (W)	6 ft 10 in (2.08 m)	250 lb (113 kg)	Jr	La Sierra HS; Cypress College	Watts, CA
C	33	Darcy Malone	7 ft 0 in (2.13 m)	244 lb (111 kg)	Sr	ACT Academy of Sport; LSU	Canberra, Australia
F	34	Jackson Rowe	6 ft 7 in (2.01 m)	210 lb (95 kg)	Fr	Wasatch Academy	Toronto, ON
G	35	Riley Dearring	6 ft 5 in (1.96 m)	180 lb (82 kg)	RS Jr	Minnetonka HS; Wisconsin	Minnetonka, MN
F	41	Jhan Paul Mejia	6 ft 10 in (2.08 m)	195 lb (88 kg)	Jr	Centro de Estudios INSCAT; Northeastern Oklahoma A&M College	Madrid, Spain

Head coach

- Dedrique Taylor (UC Davis)

Assistant coach(es)

- John Smith (Dominican (CA))
- Danny Sprinkle (Montana State)
- Robert Spence (Guilford)

Legend

- (C) Team captain
- (S) Suspended
- (I) Ineligible
- (W) Walk-on
- Injured
- Current redshirt

Roster

== Schedule and results ==
Date time, TV	Rank^{#}	Opponent^{#}	Result	Record	Site (attendance) city, state
Exhibition
11/05/2016*; 6:00 pm		St. Martin's	W 70–67		Titan Gym (472); Fullerton, CA
Non-conference regular season
11/11/2016*; 7:00 pm		Caltech	W 77–28	1–0	Titan Gym (567); Fullerton, CA
11/13/2016*; 4:00 pm		Portland State	W 106–100 ^{OT}	2–0	Titan Gym (517); Fullerton, CA
11/17/2016*; 8:00 pm, P12N		at Washington; Global Sports Classic	L 88–104	2–1	Alaska Airlines Arena (6,284); Seattle, WA
11/19/2016*; 7:00 pm		at UNLV; Global Sports Classic	L 68–77	2–2	Thomas & Mack Center (9,416); Paradise, NV
11/25/2016*; 11:00 am		vs. Jacksonville State; Global Sports Classic semifinals	L 38–61	2–3	Thomas & Mack Center; Paradise, NV
11/26/2016*; 11:00 am or 1:30 PM		vs. Alabama State; Global Sports Classic	L 67–76 ^{OT}	2–4	Thomas & Mack Center; Paradise, NV
11/30/2016*; 7:30 pm		Omaha	L 73–83	2–5	Titan Gym (637); Fullerton, CA
12/03/2016*; 6:00 pm		Pacific	W 78–77	3–5	Titan Gym (614); Fullerton, CA
12/07/2016*; 7:00 pm		at San Diego	L 75–82	3–6	Jenny Craig Pavilion (940); San Diego, CA
12/10/2016*; 6:00 pm		Southern Utah	W 75–62	4–6	Titan Gym (520); Fullerton, CA
12/18/2016*; 1:00 pm		at Omaha	L 96–102 ^{OT}	4–7	Baxter Arena (1,128); Omaha, NE
12/22/2016*; 7:30 pm		Portland	W 77–72 ^{OT}	5–7	Titan Gym (673); Fullerton, CA
12/30/2016*; 7:00 pm		Bethesda	W 99–56	6–7	Titan Gym (565); Fullerton, CA
Big West regular season
01/05/2017; 7:00 pm, ESPN3		Hawaii	W 67–64	7–7 (1–0)	Titan Gym (724); Fullerton, CA
01/07/2017; 7:30 pm		Cal State Northridge	L 65–70	7–8 (1–1)	Titan Gym (859); Fullerton, CA
01/12/2017; 7:00 pm		at Cal Poly	W 87–74	8–8 (1–2)	Mott Athletic Center (1,350); San Luis Obispo, CA
01/14/2017; 7:30 pm, ESPN3		at UC Irvine	L 67–87	8–9 (2–2)	Bren Events Center (2,468); Irvine, CA
01/18/2017; 7:00 pm, ESPN3		UC Riverside	L 63–71	8–10 (2–3)	Titan Gym (703); Fullerton, CA
01/26/2017; 7:30 pm, Prime Ticket		at Long Beach State	L 65–76	8–11 (2–4)	Walter Pyramid (3,076); Long Beach, CA
01/28/2017; 6:00 pm, ESPN3		Cal Poly	W 81–71	9–11 (3–4)	Titan Gym (1,024); Fullerton, CA
02/02/2017; 7:00 pm		at UC Santa Barbara	W 79–53	10–11 (4–4)	The Thunderdome (857); Santa Barbara, CA
02/08/2017; 7:00 pm		at UC Davis	L 65–74	10–12 (4–5)	The Pavilion (1,509); Davis, CA
02/11/2017; 7:30 pm, ESPN3		Long Beach State	W 74–69	11–12 (5–5)	Titan Gym (1,564); Fullerton, CA
02/16/2017; 8:00 pm		at UC Riverside	W 56–55	12–12 (6–5)	The SRC (738); Riverside, CA
02/18/2017; 7:30 pm, Prime Ticket		UC Davis	W 79–72	13–12 (7–5)	Titan Gym (1,138); Fullerton, CA
02/22/2017; 7:00 pm, ESPN3		UC Irvine	W 56–54	14–12 (8–5)	Titan Gym (1,526); Fullerton, CA
02/25/2017; 10:00 pm		at Hawaii	L 58–64 ^{OT}	14–13 (8–6)	Stan Sheriff Center (7,450); Honolulu, HI
03/02/2017; 7:00 pm, ESPN3		UC Santa Barbara	W 65–54	15–13 (9–6)	Titan Gym (1,205); Fullerton, CA
03/04/2017; 7:30 pm		at Cal State Northridge	W 86–78	16–13 (10–6)	Matadome (1,018); Northridge, CA
Big West tournament
03/09/2017; 2:30 pm, Prime Ticket	(3)	vs. (6) Cal State Northridge; Quarterfinals	W 81–68	17–13	Honda Center; Anaheim, CA
03/10/2017; 8:59 pm, ESPNU	(3)	vs. (2) UC Davis; Semifinals	L 64–66 ^{OT}	17–14	Honda Center (4,083); Anaheim, CA
CIT
03/16/2017*; 7:00 pm, Facebook Live		Weber State; First Round; Riley Wallace Classic	L 76–80	17–15	Titan Gym (1,293); Fullerton, CA
*Non-conference game. ^{#}Rankings from AP Poll. (#) Tournament seedings in parentheses. All times are in Pacific Time.
