= 2016–17 Long Beach State 49ers men's basketball team =

American college basketball season

2016–17 Long Beach State 49ers men's basketball
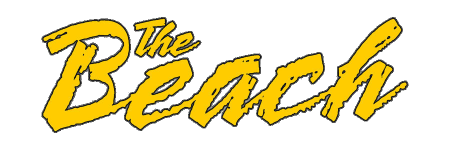
- Conference: Big West Conference
- Record: 15–19 (9–7 Big West)
- Head coach: Dan Monson (10th season)
- Assistant coaches: Rod Palmer; Myke Scholl; Senque Carey
- Home arena: Walter Pyramid

2016–17 Big West men's basketball standings
| | Conf. | | | | Overall |
| Team | W | | L | PCT | W | | L | PCT |
|---|---|---|---|---|---|---|---|---|
| UC Irvine | 12 | – | 4 | .750 | 21 | – | 15 | .583 |
| UC Davis † | 11 | – | 5 | .688 | 23 | – | 13 | .639 |
| Cal State Fullerton | 10 | – | 6 | .625 | 17 | – | 15 | .531 |
| Long Beach State | 9 | – | 7 | .563 | 15 | – | 19 | .441 |
| Hawai'i | 8 | – | 8 | .500 | 14 | – | 16 | .467 |
| Cal State Northridge | 7 | – | 9 | .438 | 11 | – | 19 | .367 |
| Cal Poly | 6 | – | 10 | .375 | 11 | – | 20 | .355 |
| UC Riverside | 5 | – | 11 | .313 | 7 | – | 21 | .250 |
| UC Santa Barbara | 4 | – | 12 | .250 | 6 | – | 22 | .214 |
† 2017 Big West tournament winner

The 2016–17 Long Beach State 49ers men's basketball team represented California State University, Long Beach during the 2016–17 NCAA Division I men's basketball season. The 49ers were led by tenth-year head coach Dan Monson and played their home games at the Walter Pyramid as members of the Big West Conference. They finished the season 15–19, 9–7 in Big West play to finish in fourth place. They defeated Hawaii in the quarterfinals of the Big West tournament before losing to UC Irvine in the semifinals.

== Previous season ==
The 49ers finished the 2015–16 season 20–15, 12–4 in Big West play to finish in third place. They defeated UC Riverside and UC Irvine to advance to the championship game of the Big West tournament where they lost to Hawaii. They received an invitation to the National Invitation Tournament where they lost in the first round to Washington.

== Departures ==
| Name | Number | Pos. | Height | Weight | Year | Hometown | Notes |
|---|---|---|---|---|---|---|---|
| Nick Faust | 2 | G | 6'2" | 200 | Senior | Baltimore, MD | Graduated |
| Branford Jones | 14 | G | 6'1" | 195 | Junior | Missouri City, TX | Left the team for personal reasons |
| A. J. Spencer | 15 | G | 6'3" | 210 | Senior | Shawnee, KS | Graduated |
| Travis Hammonds | 24 | G/F | 6'6" | 210 | Junior | Columbia, SC | Graduate transferred to Cal State Los Angeles |

== 2016 incoming recruits ==
College recruiting information
| Name | Hometown | School | Height | Weight | Commit date |
|---|---|---|---|---|---|
| Jordan Griffin #43 SG | Corona, CA | Centennial High School | 6 ft 3 in (1.91 m) | 170 lb (77 kg) | Sep 22, 2015 |
| Jordan Griffin #43 SG | Recruit ratings: Scout: Rivals: (77) | | | | |
| Loren Jackson #42 PG | Chicago, IL | Victory Rock Prep | 5 ft 7 in (1.70 m) | 130 lb (59 kg) | Nov 11, 2015 |
| Loren Jackson #42 PG | Recruit ratings: Scout: Rivals: (76) | | | | |
| Javonntie Jackson #64 SF | Compton, CA | Compton High School | 6 ft 6 in (1.98 m) | 180 lb (82 kg) | Nov 11, 2015 |
| Javonntie Jackson #64 SF | Recruit ratings: Scout: Rivals: (70) | | | | |
Overall recruit ranking:
Note: In many cases, Scout, Rivals, 247Sports, On3, and ESPN may conflict in their listings of height and weight.; In these cases, the average was taken. ESPN grades are on a 100-point scale.; Sources: "2016 Team Ranking". Rivals.

=== 2017 incoming recruits ===
College recruiting information (2017)
| Name | Hometown | School | Height | Weight | Commit date |
|---|---|---|---|---|---|
| Jordan Roberts #75 SF | Bakersfield, CA | Ridgeview High School | 6 ft 6 in (1.98 m) | 195 lb (88 kg) | Aug 26, 2016 |
| Jordan Roberts #75 SF | Recruit ratings: Scout: Rivals: (66) | | | | |
Overall recruit ranking:
Note: In many cases, Scout, Rivals, 247Sports, On3, and ESPN may conflict in their listings of height and weight.; In these cases, the average was taken. ESPN grades are on a 100-point scale.; Sources: "2017 Team Ranking". Rivals.

== Roster ==
2016–17 Long Beach State 49ers men's basketball team
Players
Coaches

| Pos. | # | Name | Height | Weight | Year | Previous school | Hometown |
|---|---|---|---|---|---|---|---|
| F | 0 | Gabe Levin | 6 ft 7 in (2.01 m) | 215 lb (98 kg) | RS Jr | St. Thomas More School; Loyola Marymount | Oak Park, IL |
| G | 1 | Evan Payne | 6 ft 1 in (1.85 m) | 190 lb (86 kg) | RS Jr | Kingdom Christian Academy; Loyola Marymount | Akron, OH |
| G | 2 | Loren Cristian Jackson | 5 ft 8 in (1.73 m) | 145 lb (66 kg) | Fr | Victory Rock Prep | Chicago, IL |
| G | 3 | Noah Blackwell | 6 ft 2 in (1.88 m) | 190 lb (86 kg) | So | Woodcreek HS | Roseville, CA |
| F | 4 | Temidayo Yussuf | 6 ft 7 in (2.01 m) | 250 lb (113 kg) | RS So | St. Joseph HS | Oakland, CA |
| F | 5 | Mason Riggins | 6 ft 8 in (2.03 m) | 255 lb (116 kg) | So | Whitewright HS | Whitewright, TX |
| F | 10 | Quentin Shropshire (W) | 6 ft 6 in (1.98 m) | 210 lb (95 kg) | Jr | University HS | Los Angeles, CA |
| G | 11 | Jordan Griffin | 6 ft 3 in (1.91 m) | 165 lb (75 kg) | Fr | Centennial HS | Corona, CA |
| G | 12 | Alex Rifkind (W) | 6 ft 1 in (1.85 m) | 170 lb (77 kg) | RS So | North Broward Prep | Boca Raton, FL |
| G/F | 13 | Barry Ogalue (W) | 6 ft 5 in (1.96 m) | 200 lb (91 kg) | RS Jr | Laguna Creek HS; Yuba CC | Elk Grove, CA |
| G | 20 | Anson Moye (W) | 6 ft 0 in (1.83 m) | 185 lb (84 kg) | Sr | Oak Christian HS | Thousand Oaks, CA |
| G | 21 | Justin Bibbins | 5 ft 8 in (1.73 m) | 150 lb (68 kg) | Jr | Bishop Montgomery HS | Carson, CA |
| F | 22 | LaRond Williams | 6 ft 9 in (2.06 m) | 200 lb (91 kg) | RS Fr | Price HS | Long Beach, CA |
| F | 23 | Roschon Prince | 6 ft 6 in (1.98 m) | 235 lb (107 kg) | RS Jr | Long Beach Poly HS; USC | Long Beach, CA |
| F | 35 | Javonntie Jackson | 6 ft 6 in (1.98 m) | 190 lb (86 kg) | Fr | Compton HS | Compton, CA |

Head coach

- Dan Monson (Idaho)

Assistant coach(es)

- Rod Palmer (UC Irvine)
- Myke Scholl (Loyola Marymount)
- Senque Carey (New Mexico)

Legend

- (C) Team captain
- (S) Suspended
- (I) Ineligible
- (W) Walk-on
- Injured
- Current redshirt

Roster

== Schedule and results ==
| Date time, TV | Rank^{#} | Opponent^{#} | Result | Record | Site (attendance) city, state |
Exhibition
| 11/05/2016*; 4:00 pm | | Caltech; Homecoming | W 115–58 | | Walter Pyramid (4,606); Long Beach, CA |
Non-conference regular season
| 11/11/2016*; 7:00 pm | | Cal State Los Angeles | W 95–59 | 1–0 | Walter Pyramid (3,125); Long Beach, CA |
| 11/13/2016*; 5:00 pm, ESPN3 | | at Wichita State; Battle 4 Atlantis Opening Round | L 55–92 | 1–1 | Charles Koch Arena (10,506); Wichita, KS |
| 11/15/2016*; 5:00 pm, ACCN Extra | | at No. 5 North Carolina | L 67–93 | 1–2 | Dean Smith Center (12,581); Chapel Hill, NC |
| 11/17/2016*; 4:00 pm, ACCN Extra | | at No. 12 Louisville; Battle 4 Atlantis Opening Round | L 56–88 | 1–3 | KFC Yum! Center (14,337); Louisville, KY |
| 11/20/2016*; 7:00 pm, P12N | | at No. 16 UCLA | L 77–114 | 1–4 | Pauley Pavilion (8,294); Los Angeles, CA |
| 11/22/2016*; 8:00 pm, P12N | | at Washington | L 88–94 | 1–5 | Alaska Airlines Arena (6,568); Seattle, WA |
| 11/24/2016*; 3:00 pm | | vs. Binghamton; Battle 4 Atlantis | L 64–72 | 1–6 | Alico Arena (102); Fort Myers, FL |
| 11/25/2016*; 5:00 pm, ESPN3 | | at Florida Gulf Coast; Battle 4 Atlantis | L 67–68 ^{OT} | 1–7 | Alico Arena (3,291); Fort Myers, FL |
| 11/29/2016*; 5:00 pm, ESPN3 | | at No. 4 Kansas | L 61–91 | 1–8 | Allen Fieldhouse (16,300); Lawrence, KS |
| 12/03/2016*; 6:00 pm, ESPN3 | | at New Mexico State | L 85–93 | 1–9 | Pan American Center (3,679); Las Cruces, NM |
| 12/07/2016*; 7:30 pm | | Pepperdine | W 75–66 | 2–9 | Walter Pyramid (2,563); Long Beach, CA |
| 12/10/2016*; 3:00 pm, ESPN2 | | at Texas | L 65–71 | 2–10 | Frank Erwin Center (10,173); Austin, TX |
| 12/16/2016*; 8:00 pm, P12N | | vs. Oregon State; Dam City Classic | W 71–67 | 3–10 | Moda Center (6,521); Portland, OR |
| 12/19/2016*; 7:30 pm | | The Master's | W 97–78 | 4–10 | Walter Pyramid (1,911); Long Beach, CA |
| 12/22/2016*; 7:00 pm | | Colorado State | W 56–55 | 5–10 | Walter Pyramid (2,247); Long Beach, CA |
| 12/29/2016*; 11:00 am, ESPN3 | | at Eastern Michigan | L 72–98 | 5–11 | Convocation Center (928); Ypsilanti, MI |
Big West regular season
| 01/04/2017; 7:00 pm, ESPN3 | | at UC Irvine | L 67–82 | 5–12 (0–1) | Bren Events Center (1,955); Irvine, CA |
| 01/07/2017; 4:00 pm, ESPN3 | | UC Riverside | W 70–64 | 6–12 (1–1) | Walter Pyramid (2,906); Long Beach, CA |
| 01/11/2017; 4:00 pm, FS West | | Cal State Northridge | L 82–89 | 6–13 (1–2) | Walter Pyramid (2,278); Long Beach, CA |
| 01/14/2017; 8:59 pm | | at Hawaii | L 107–114 ^{OT} | 6–14 (1–3) | Stan Sheriff Center (5,911); Honolulu, HI |
| 01/19/2017; 7:30 pm, FS West | | UC Santa Barbara | W 81–76 | 7–14 (2–3) | Walter Pyramid (3,017); Long Beach, CA |
| 01/21/2017; 7:00 pm, ESPNU | | at Cal Poly | W 98–92 ^{OT} | 8–14 (3–3) | Mott Athletic Center (3,032); San Luis Obispo, CA |
| 01/26/2017; 7:00 pm, FS West | | Cal State Fullerton | W 76–65 | 9–14 (4–3) | Walter Pyramid (3,076); Long Beach, CA |
| 02/01/2017; 4:00 pm, ESPN3 | | at Cal State Northridge | L 98–108 | 9–15 (4–4) | Matadome (1,177); Northridge, CA |
| 02/04/2017; 8:00 pm, ESPNU | | UC Irvine | W 72–63 | 10–15 (5–4) | Walter Pyramid (4,213); Long Beach, CA |
| 02/09/2017; 7:00 pm, ESPN3 | | at UC Riverside | W 78–71 | 11–15 (6–4) | The SRC (695); Riverside, CA |
| 02/11/2017; 7:30 pm, ESPN3 | | at Cal State Fullerton | L 69–74 | 11–16 (6–5) | Titan Gym (1,564); Fullerton, CA |
| 02/16/2017; 7:00 pm, ESPN3 | | UC Davis | W 78–69 ^{OT} | 12–16 (7–5) | Walter Pyramid (2,554); Long Beach, CA |
| 02/18/2017; 4:00 pm | | at UC Santa Barbara | W 66–48 | 13–16 (8–5) | The Thunderdome (1,143); Santa Barbara, CA |
| 02/23/2017; 7:00 pm, ESPN3 | | Cal Poly | L 71–78 | 13–17 (8–6) | Walter Pyramid (3,164); Long Beach, CA |
| 02/25/2017; 5:00 pm, ESPNU | | at UC Davis | L 71–75 ^{OT} | 13–18 (8–7) | The Pavilion (5,873); Davis, CA |
| 03/04/2017; 5:00 pm, ESPN3 | | Hawaii | W 84–75 | 14–18 (9–7) | Walter Pyramid (3,021); Long Beach, CA |
Big West tournament
| 03/09/2017; 8:30 pm | (4) | vs. (5) Hawaii; Quarterfinals | W 73–62 | 15–18 | Honda Center (3,486); Anaheim, CA |
| 03/10/2017; 6:30 pm, ESPN3 | (4) | vs. (1) UC Irvine; Semifinals | L 57–62 | 15–19 | Honda Center (5,124); Anaheim, CA |
*Non-conference game. ^{#}Rankings from AP Poll. (#) Tournament seedings in parentheses. All times are in Pacific Time.
