= 2016–17 Cal State Northridge Matadors men's basketball team =

American college basketball season

2016–17 Cal State Northridge Matadors men's basketball
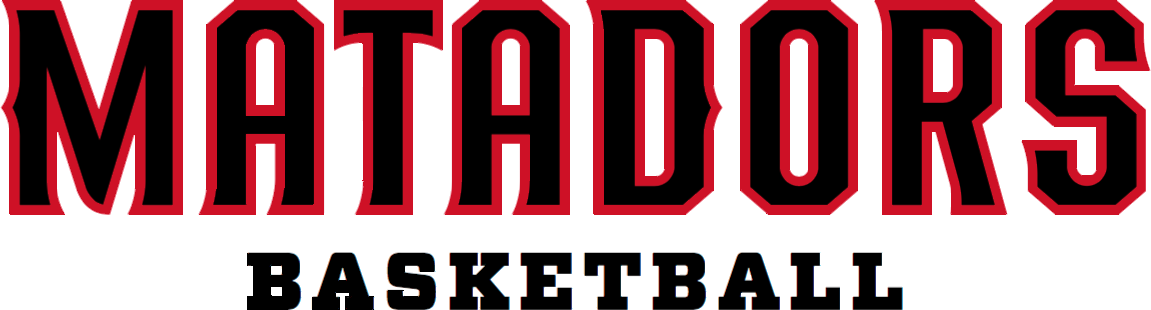
- Conference: Big West Conference
- Record: 11–19 (7–9 Big West)
- Head coach: Reggie Theus (4th season)
- Assistant coaches: Jason Levy; Chris Pompey; Jeff Theiler
- Home arena: Matadome

2016–17 Big West men's basketball standings
	Conf.				Overall
Team	W		L	PCT	W		L	PCT
UC Irvine	12	–	4	.750	21	–	15	.583
UC Davis †	11	–	5	.688	23	–	13	.639
Cal State Fullerton	10	–	6	.625	17	–	15	.531
Long Beach State	9	–	7	.563	15	–	19	.441
Hawai'i	8	–	8	.500	14	–	16	.467
Cal State Northridge	7	–	9	.438	11	–	19	.367
Cal Poly	6	–	10	.375	11	–	20	.355
UC Riverside	5	–	11	.313	7	–	21	.250
UC Santa Barbara	4	–	12	.250	6	–	22	.214
† 2017 Big West tournament winner

The 2016–17 Cal State Northridge Matadors men's basketball team represented California State University, Northridge (also known as CSUN) during the 2016–17 NCAA Division I men's basketball season. The Matadors, led by fourth-year head coach Reggie Theus, played their home games at the Matadome as members of the Big West Conference. They finished the season 11–19, 7–9 in Big West play to finish in sixth place. In the Big West tournament, they lost to Cal State Fullerton in the quarterfinals.

== Previous season ==
The Matadors finished the 2015–16 season 10–20, 5–11 in Big West play to finish in a tie for sixth place. Due to "serious violations" in the basketball program, the school self-imposed a postseason ban.

== Offseason ==
=== Departures ===
Name	Number	Pos.	Height	Weight	Year	Hometown	Notes
Landon Drew	2	G	6'1"	182	Senior	Los Angeles, CA	Graduated
Zacarry Douglas	5	F	6'8"	205	Sophomore	Landover, MD	Transferred to El Camino College Compton Center
Tre Hale-Edmerson	11	F/C	6'9"	211	Senior	Sheridan, OR	Graduated
Olalekan Ajayi	12	F/C	6'11"	245	RS Senior	Lagos, Nigeria	Graduated
Kelton Conway	13	G	5'11"	176	Freshman	Woodland Hills, CA	Walk-on; didn't return

=== Incoming transfers ===
Name	Number	Pos.	Height	Weight	Year	Hometown	Notes
Sam Finley		G	6'2"	179	Senior	Corona, CA	Transferred from Ole Miss. Under NCAA transfer rules, Finley will have to sit out for the 2016–17 season. Will have one year of remaining eligibility.
Lyrik Shreiner		G	6'3"	190	Freshman	Phoenix, AZ	Transferred from TCU. Under NCAA transfer rules, Shreiner will have to sit out for the 2016–17 season. Will have three years of remaining eligibility.
Anthony Swan		G	6'7"	190	Junior	Los Angeles, CA	Transferred from George Washington. Under NCAA transfer rules, Swan will have to sit out for the 2016–17 season. Will have two years of remaining eligibility.

=== 2016 incoming recruits ===
College recruiting information
Name	Hometown	School	Height	Weight	Commit date
Mahamadou Kaba-Camara; C	Conakry, Guinea	Balboa City School	7 ft 0 in (2.13 m)	273 lb (124 kg)	Sep 16, 2016
Mahamadou Kaba-Camara; C	Recruit ratings: Scout: Rivals: (NR)				
Overall recruit ranking:
Note: In many cases, Scout, Rivals, 247Sports, On3, and ESPN may conflict in their listings of height and weight.; In these cases, the average was taken. ESPN grades are on a 100-point scale.; Sources: "2016 Team Ranking". Rivals.

== Roster ==
2016–17 Cal State Northridge Matadors men's basketball team
Players
Coaches

Pos.	#	Name	Height	Weight	Year	Previous school	Hometown
G	0	Kendall Smith	6 ft 3 in (1.91 m)	190 lb (86 kg)	RS Jr	Deer Valley HS; UNLV	Antioch, CA
G	1	Micheal Warren	6 ft 5 in (1.96 m)	180 lb (82 kg)	Jr	Theodore Roosevelt HS	Washington, D.C.
G	3	Darin Johnson	6 ft 5 in (1.96 m)	191 lb (87 kg)	RS Jr	Sheldon HS; Washington	Sacramento, CA
F	4	Tavrion Dawson	6 ft 8 in (2.03 m)	202 lb (92 kg)	Jr	Gardena Serra HS	Long Beach, CA
C	5	Mahamadou Kaba-Camara (redshirt)	7 ft 0 in (2.13 m)	273 lb (124 kg)	Fr	Balboa City HS	Conakry, Guinea
G	10	Jason Richardson	6 ft 2 in (1.88 m)	210 lb (95 kg)	So	Junípero Serra HS	Hawthorne, CA
F	12	Siyao Sun (W)	6 ft 10 in (2.08 m)	245 lb (111 kg)	Fr	Bishop O'Connell HS	Beijing, China
G	13	Julian Richardson (W)	6 ft 3 in (1.91 m)	201 lb (91 kg)	Jr	El Camino Real HS; Fullerton College	Woodland Hills, CA
G	14	Mehran Nazarian (W)	6 ft 3 in (1.91 m)	185 lb (84 kg)	So	North HS	Hawthorne, CA
G	15	Antonio Bruno (W)	5 ft 9 in (1.75 m)	185 lb (84 kg)	Fr	Hillcrest Prep	Youngstown, OH
G	22	Aaron Parks	6 ft 3 in (1.91 m)	210 lb (95 kg)	Jr	Lake Clifton HS	Baltimore, MD
G	23	Jerron Wilbut	6 ft 3 in (1.91 m)	180 lb (82 kg)	Jr	Downers Grove South HS	Chicago, IL
F	24	Reggie Theus, Jr.	6 ft 6 in (1.98 m)	217 lb (98 kg)	RS So	Fairfax HS; South Carolina	Los Angeles, CA
F	25	Rakim Lubin	6 ft 8 in (2.03 m)	257 lb (117 kg)	RS So	Buford HS; Connecticut	Miami, FL
C	42	Blair Orr	6 ft 8 in (2.03 m)	252 lb (114 kg)	RS So	El Camino Real HS; Winnipeg	Camarillo, CA
C	45	Dylan Johns	6 ft 11 in (2.11 m)	240 lb (109 kg)	RS Jr	Copleston HS; Texas A&M	Ipswich, England
G		Sam Finley (I) (redshirt)	6 ft 2 in (1.88 m)	190 lb (86 kg)	RS Sr	Centennial HS; Ole Miss	Riverside, CA
G		Lyrik Shreiner (I) (redshirt)	6 ft 3 in (1.91 m)	190 lb (86 kg)	RS So	Hillcrest Academy; TCU	Phoenix, AZ
F		Anthony Swan (I) (redshirt)	6 ft 7 in (2.01 m)	196 lb (89 kg)	RS Jr	Virginia Episcopal School; George Washington	Los Angeles, CA

Head coach

- Reggie Theus (UNLV)

Assistant coach(es)

- Jason Levy (Cal State Northridge)
- Chris Pompey (Pittsburgh)
- Jeff Theiler (La Verne)

Legend

- (C) Team captain
- (S) Suspended
- (I) Ineligible
- (W) Walk-on
- Injured
- Current redshirt

Roster

== Schedule and results ==
Date time, TV	Rank^{#}	Opponent^{#}	Result	Record	Site (attendance) city, state
Exhibition
10/29/2016*; 2:00 pm		Cal State Los Angeles	W 94–75		Matadome; Northridge, CA
Non-conference regular season
11/11/2016*; 7:00 pm		Pomona-Pitzer	W 96–72	1–0	Matadome (1,006); Northridge, CA
11/13/2016*; 6:00 pm, P12N		at No. 16 UCLA	L 87–102	1–1	Pauley Pavilion (7,149); Los Angeles, CA
11/15/2016*; 7:00 pm, P12N		at Stanford	L 69–96	1–2	Maples Pavilion (2,801); Stanford, CA
11/19/2016*; 8:00 pm		Northern Illinois	W 84–82	2–2	Matadome (886); Northridge, CA
11/24/2016*; 11:00 am, ESPN3		vs. Texas A&M; Wooden Legacy quarterfinals	L 73–95	2–3	Titan Gym; Fullerton, CA
11/25/2016*; 12:00 pm, ESPNU		vs. New Mexico; Wooden Legacy consolation 2nd round	L 89–105	2–4	Titan Gym; Fullerton, CA
11/27/2016*; 8:00 pm, ESPNU		vs. Portland; Wooden Legacy 7th place game	L 78–96	2–5	Honda Center (3,718); Anaheim, CA
12/03/2016*; 4:00 pm		Idaho State	W 79–76	3–5	Matadome (1,086); Northridge, CA
12/05/2016*; 3:30 pm, FS1		at St. John's	L 70-76	3-6	Carnesecca Arena (3,901); Queens, NY
12/10/2016*; 7:00 pm		Loyola Marymount	L 68–69	3–7	Matadome (787); Northridge, CA
12/16/2016*; 7:00 pm		Bethesda	L 95–100	3–8	Matadome (649); Northridge, CA
12/21/2016*; 6:00 pm		at Boise State	L 62–79	3–9	Taco Bell Arena (3,468); Boise, ID
12/29/2016*; 7:00 pm		Morgan State	W 82–61	4–9	Matadome (569); Northridge, CA
Big West regular season
01/04/2017; 7:00 pm		UC Riverside	W 82–76	5–9 (1–0)	Matadome (497); Northridge, CA
01/07/2017; 7:00 pm		at Cal State Fullerton	W 70–65	6–9 (2–0)	Titan Gym (859); Fullerton, CA
01/11/2017; 7:30 pm, FSW		at Long Beach State	W 89–82	7–9 (3–0)	Walter Pyramid (2,278); Long Beach, CA
01/14/2017; 7:00 pm, ESPNU		UC Davis	L 68–71	7–10 (3–1)	Matadome (1,057); Northridge, CA
01/18/2017; 10:00 pm		at Hawaii	L 77–80	7–11 (3–2)	Stan Sheriff Center (5,309); Honolulu, HI
01/21/2017; 7:00 pm		UC Irvine	L 73–105	7–12 (3–3)	Matadome (1,107); Northridge, CA
01/25/2017; 7:00 pm		at UC Santa Barbara	W 78–57	8–12 (4–3)	The Thunderdome (1,166); Santa Barbara, CA
01/28/2017; 5:00 pm		at UC Riverside	W 63–59	9–12 (5–3)	The SRC (677); Riverside, CA
02/01/2017; 7:00 pm, ESPN3		Long Beach State	W 108–98	10–12 (6–3)	Matadome (1,177); Northridge, CA
02/04/2017; 7:30 pm, Prime Ticket		Hawaii	L 72–76	10–13 (6–4)	Matadome (1,085); Northridge, CA
02/11/2017; 7:30 pm, Prime Ticket		UC Santa Barbara	W 77–55	11–13 (7–4)	Matadome (1,460); Northridge, CA
02/15/2017; 7:00 pm, ESPN3		Cal Poly	L 71–85	11–14 (7–5)	Matadome (405); Northridge, CA
02/23/2017; 7:00 pm		at UC Davis	L 85–96	11–15 (7–6)	The Pavilion (1,621); Davis, CA
02/25/2017; 7:30 pm, ESPN3		at UC Irvine	L 80–83	11–16 (7–7)	Bren Events Center (4,234); Irvine, CA
03/02/2017; 7:00 pm		at Cal Poly	L 70–76	11–17 (7–8)	Mott Center (1,280); San Luis Obispo, CA
03/04/2017; 7:30 pm		Cal State Fullerton	L 78–86	11–18 (7–9)	Matadome (1,018); Northridge, CA
Big West tournament
03/09/2017; 2:30 pm	(6)	vs. (3) Cal State Fullerton; Quarterfinals	L 68–81	11–19	Honda Center; Anaheim, CA
*Non-conference game. ^{#}Rankings from AP Poll. (#) Tournament seedings in parentheses. All times are in Pacific Time.
