= 2016–17 UC Irvine Anteaters men's basketball team =

American college basketball season

2016–17 UC Irvine Anteaters men's basketball

Big West Regular Season champions

NIT, First round
- Conference: Big West Conference
- Record: 21–15 (12–4 Big West)
- Head coach: Russell Turner (7th season)
- Assistant coaches: Blaine Taylor; Ryan Badrtalei; Michael Wilder
- Home arena: Bren Events Center

2016–17 Big West men's basketball standings
	Conf.				Overall
Team	W		L	PCT	W		L	PCT
UC Irvine	12	–	4	.750	21	–	15	.583
UC Davis †	11	–	5	.688	23	–	13	.639
Cal State Fullerton	10	–	6	.625	17	–	15	.531
Long Beach State	9	–	7	.563	15	–	19	.441
Hawai'i	8	–	8	.500	14	–	16	.467
Cal State Northridge	7	–	9	.438	11	–	19	.367
Cal Poly	6	–	10	.375	11	–	20	.355
UC Riverside	5	–	11	.313	7	–	21	.250
UC Santa Barbara	4	–	12	.250	6	–	22	.214
† 2017 Big West tournament winner

The 2016–17 UC Irvine Anteaters men's basketball team represented the University of California, Irvine during the 2016–17 NCAA Division I men's basketball season. The Anteaters were led by seventh year head coach Russell Turner and played their home games at the Bren Events Center as members of the Big West Conference. They finished the season 21–15, 12–4 in Big West play to win the regular season conference championship. As the No. 1 seed in the Big West tournament, they defeated UC Riverside and Long Beach State before losing to UC Davis in the championship game. As a No. 1 seed in their conference tournament who failed to win their conference tournament title, UC Irvine received an automatic bid to the National Invitation Tournament. As a No. 8 seed, they were defeated by No. 1 seed Illinois State in the first round. The team won their third Big West Regular Season title in the past four years and their 5th straight season with at least 20 wins.

== Previous season ==
The Anteaters finished the 2015–16 season 28–10, 13–3 in Big West play to win a share of the regular season Big West championship. They defeated Cal Poly in the quarterfinals of the Big West tournament to advance to the semifinals where they lost to Long Beach State. They were invited to the CollegeInsider.com Tournament where they defeated North Dakota, Louisiana–Lafayette, and Coastal Carolina to advance to the championship game. In the championship game, they lost to Columbia.

== Off-Season ==
=== 2016 Recruiting Class ===
College recruiting information
Name	Hometown	School	Height	Weight	Commit date
Eyassu Worku; PG	Los Alamitos, CA	Los Alamitos High School	6 ft 2 in (1.88 m)	165 lb (75 kg)	Nov 6, 2015
Eyassu Worku; PG	Recruit ratings: Scout: 247Sports: ESPN: (80)				
Evan Leonard; PG	Cerritos, CA	Cerritos High School	6 ft 1 in (1.85 m)	170 lb (77 kg)	Jun 5, 2015
Evan Leonard; PG	Recruit ratings: ESPN: (73)				
Tommy Rutherford; C	San Diego, CA	Grossmont High School	6 ft 8 in (2.03 m)	220 lb (100 kg)	
Tommy Rutherford; C	Recruit ratings: ESPN: (72)				
Brad Greene; C	Lone Pine, CA	Lone Pine High School	6 ft 10 in (2.08 m)	285 lb (129 kg)	
Brad Greene; C	Recruit ratings: ESPN: (59)				
Overall recruit ranking: Scout: n/a Rivals: n/a ESPN: n/a
Note: In many cases, Scout, Rivals, 247Sports, On3, and ESPN may conflict in their listings of height and weight.; In these cases, the average was taken. ESPN grades are on a 100-point scale.; Sources: "ESPN - UC Irvine Basketball Recruiting 2016". ESPN.; "2016 Team Ranking". Rivals.

== Roster ==
2016–17 UC Irvine Anteaters men's basketball team
Players
Coaches

Pos.	#	Name	Height	Weight	Year	Hometown
G	0	Jaron Martin	5 ft 10 in (1.78 m)	170 lb (77 kg)	Sr	Sunland, California
G	2	Max Hazzard	5 ft 10 in (1.78 m)	170 lb (77 kg)	RS Fr	Los Angeles, California
G	4	Justin Wertner (redshirt)	6 ft 4 in (1.93 m)	203 lb (92 kg)	Fr	Memphis, Tennessee
F	5	Jonathan Galloway	6 ft 10 in (2.08 m)	235 lb (107 kg)	So	Brentwood, California
G	10	Luke Nelson	6 ft 3 in (1.91 m)	190 lb (86 kg)	Sr	Worthing, England
F	11	John Edgar Jr. (W)	6 ft 5 in (1.96 m)	217 lb (98 kg)	Fr	Chino Hills, California
C	12	Ioannis Dimakopoulos	7 ft 2 in (2.18 m)	255 lb (116 kg)	Sr	Patra, Greece
F	13	Brandon Smith	6 ft 5 in (1.96 m)	190 lb (86 kg)	So	Santa Ana, California
G	14	Evan Leonard	6 ft 1 in (1.85 m)	190 lb (86 kg)	Fr	Cerritos, California
G	23	Darrian Traylor	6 ft 4 in (1.93 m)	210 lb (95 kg)	RS Fr	Las Vegas, Nevada
G	24	Eyassu Worku	6 ft 2 in (1.88 m)	170 lb (77 kg)	Fr	Artesia, California
G	25	Spencer Rivers (W)	6 ft 2 in (1.88 m)	200 lb (91 kg)	So	Winter Park, Florida
C	32	Adam Liberman (W) (redshirt)	6 ft 10 in (2.08 m)	240 lb (109 kg)	Fr	Valley Village, California
F	42	Tommy Rutherford	6 ft 8 in (2.03 m)	220 lb (100 kg)	Fr	El Cajon, California
F	50	Elston Jones (redshirt)	6 ft 9 in (2.06 m)	275 lb (125 kg)	Jr	Goodyear, Arizona
C	55	Brad Greene	6 ft 10 in (2.08 m)	320 lb (145 kg)	Fr	Lone Pine, California

Head coach

- Russell Turner (Hampden–Sydney)

Assistant coach(es)

- Blaine Taylor (Montana)
- Ryan Badrtalei (UCLA)
- Michael Wilder (UC Irvine)

Legend

- (C) Team captain
- (S) Suspended
- (I) Ineligible
- (W) Walk-on
- Injured
- Current redshirt

Roster

== Schedule and results ==
Date time, TV	Rank^{#}	Opponent^{#}	Result	Record	Site (attendance) city, state
Exhibition
11/05/2016*; 2:00 pm, Big West TV		Sonoma State	W 81–63		Bren Events Center (1,449); Irvine, CA
Non-conference regular season
11/11/2016*; 7:00 pm, Big West TV		Utah State	L 56–72	0–1	Bren Events Center (1,883); Irvine, CA
11/14/2016*; 7:00 pm, Big West TV		South Dakota State; Sanford Pentagon Showcase Opening Game	W 73–58	1–1	Bren Events Center (1,172); Irvine, CA
11/16/2016*; 8:00 pm, P12N		at No. 25 California	L 65–75 ^{OT}	1–2	Haas Pavilion (8,104); Berkeley, CA
11/19/2016*; 7:00 pm, Big West TV		Pacific	W 72–65	2–2	Bren Events Center (1,678); Irvine, CA
11/25/2016*; 6:00 pm		vs. South Dakota State; Sanford Pentagon Showcase	W 63–52	3–2	Sanford Pentagon (1,826); Sioux Falls, CA
11/26/2016*; 12:00 pm		vs. Milwaukee; Sanford Pentagon Showcase	L 37–54	3–3	Sanford Pentagon (379); Sioux Falls, SD
11/27/2016*; 10:00 am		vs. East Tennessee State; Sanford Pentagon Showcase	L 66–72	3–4	Sanford Pentagon (291); Sioux Falls, SD
11/30/2016*; 7:00 pm, theW.TV		at Santa Clara	W 58–55	4–4	Leavey Center (1,082); Santa Clara, CA
12/06/2016*; 7:00 pm, P12N		at No. 20 Arizona	L 57–79	4–5	McKale Center (14,208); Tucson, AZ
12/09/2016*; 7:00 pm, Big West TV		Pomona-Pitzer	W 80–53	5–5	Bren Events Center (1,141); Irvine, CA
12/11/2016*; 5:00 pm, CHN/theW.tv		at No. 12 Saint Mary's	L 53–84	5–6	McKeon Pavilion (3,207); Moraga, CA
12/14/2016*; 7:00 pm, MWN		at Nevada	L 69–76	5–7	Lawlor Events Center (6,911); Reno, NV
12/19/2016*; 6:00 pm, WAC Digital Network		at New Mexico State	L 79–85 ^{OT}	5–8	Pan American Center (3,794); Las Cruces, NM
12/21/2016*; 4:00 pm		vs. Akron; Don Haskins Sun Bowl Invitational semifinals	L 80–88	5–9	Don Haskins Center (5,333); El Paso, TX
12/22/2016*; 4:00 pm		at UTEP; Don Haskins Sun Bowl Invitational 3rd place game	W 62–57	6–9	Don Haskins Center (4,633); El Paso, TX
12/30/2016*; 7:00 pm, Big West TV		Life Pacific	W 101–43	7–9	Bren Events Center (1,107); Irvine, CA
Big West regular season
01/04/2017; 7:00 pm, ESPN3		Long Beach State; Black & Blue Rivalry	W 82–67	8–9 (1–0)	Bren Events Center (1,944); Irvine, CA
01/07/2017; 7:30 pm, Prime Ticket		Hawaii	W 84–56	9–9 (2–0)	Bren Events Center (2,359); Irvine, CA
01/12/2017; 7:00 pm, Big West TV		at UC Santa Barbara	W 66–62	10–9 (3–0)	The Thunderdome (3,056); Santa Barbara, CA
01/14/2017; 5:00 pm, ESPN3		Cal State Fullerton	W 87–67	11–9 (4–0)	Bren Events Center (2,468); Irvine, CA
01/18/2017; 7:00 pm, Big West TV		at Cal Poly	W 70–48	12–9 (5–0)	Mott Gym (1,250); San Luis Obispo, CA
01/21/2017; 7:00 pm, Big West TV		at Cal State Northridge	W 105–73	13–9 (6–0)	Matadome (1,107); Northridge, CA
01/26/2017; 7:00 pm, ESPN3		Cal Poly	L 66–79	13–10 (6–1)	Bren Events Center (2,107); Irvine, CA
01/28/2017; 5:00 pm, Big West TV		at UC Davis	L 65–74	13–11 (6–2)	The Pavilion (3,574); Davis, CA
02/04/2017; 8:00 pm, ESPNU		at Long Beach State; Black & Blue Rivalry	L 63–72	13–12 (6–3)	Walter Pyramid (4,213); Long Beach, CA
02/08/2017; 7:00 pm, ESPN3		UC Santa Barbara	W 64–47	14–12 (7–3)	Bren Events Center (1,759); Irvine, CA
02/11/2017; 10:30 pm, OC Sports		at Hawaii	W 72–58	15–12 (8–3)	Stan Sheriff Center (7,452); Honolulu, HI
02/18/2017; 9:00 pm, ESPNU		UC Riverside	W 79–60	16–12 (9–3)	Bren Events Center (1,860); Irvine, CA
02/22/2017; 7:00 pm, ESPN3		at Cal State Fullerton	L 54–56	16–13 (9–4)	Titan Gym (1,526); Fullerton, CA
02/25/2017; 7:30 pm, ESPN3		Cal State Northridge; Homecoming	W 83–80	17–13 (10–4)	Bren Events Center (4,234); Irvine, CA
03/01/2017; 7:00 pm, ESPN3		at UC Riverside	W 68–56	18–13 (11–4)	The SRC (781); Riverside, CA
03/04/2017; 3:00 pm, Prime Ticket		UC Davis	W 79–49	19–13 (12–4)	Bren Events Center (4,384); Irvine, CA
Big West tournament
03/09/2017; 6:00 pm, Prime Ticket	(1)	vs. (8) UC Riverside; Quarterfinals	W 76–67	20–13	Honda Center (3,486); Anaheim, CA
03/10/2017; 6:30 pm, ESPN3	(1)	vs. (4) Long Beach State; Semifinals	W 62–57	21–13	Honda Center (4,083); Anaheim, CA
03/11/2017; 8:30 pm, ESPN2	(1)	vs. (2) UC Davis; Championship game	L 47–50	21–14	Honda Center (5,085); Anaheim, CA
NIT
3/15/2017*; 6:30 pm, ESPNU	(8)	at (1) Illinois State; First round – Illinois State Bracket	L 71–85	21–15	Redbird Arena (5,124); Normal, IL
*Non-conference game. ^{#}Rankings from AP Poll. (#) Tournament seedings in parentheses. All times are in Pacific Time.
