= 2016–17 UC Santa Barbara Gauchos men's basketball team =

American college basketball season

2016–17 UC Santa Barbara Gauchos men's basketball
- Conference: Big West Conference
- Record: 6–22 (4–12 Big West)
- Head coach: Bob Williams (19th season)
- Assistant coaches: Matt Stock; Kevin Bromley; Ryan Madry
- Home arena: The Thunderdome

2016–17 Big West men's basketball standings
	Conf.				Overall
Team	W		L	PCT	W		L	PCT
UC Irvine	12	–	4	.750	21	–	15	.583
UC Davis †	11	–	5	.688	23	–	13	.639
Cal State Fullerton	10	–	6	.625	17	–	15	.531
Long Beach State	9	–	7	.563	15	–	19	.441
Hawai'i	8	–	8	.500	14	–	16	.467
Cal State Northridge	7	–	9	.438	11	–	19	.367
Cal Poly	6	–	10	.375	11	–	20	.355
UC Riverside	5	–	11	.313	7	–	21	.250
UC Santa Barbara	4	–	12	.250	6	–	22	.214
† 2017 Big West tournament winner

The 2016–17 UC Santa Barbara Gauchos men's basketball team represented the University of California, Santa Barbara during the 2016–17 NCAA Division I men's basketball season. The Gauchos, led by 19th-year head coach Bob Williams, played their home games at the UC Santa Barbara Events Center, nicknamed the Thunderdome, as members of the Big West Conference.

They finished the season 6–22, 4–12 in Big West play to finish in last place. They failed to qualify for the Big West tournament.

On March 9, 2017, the school informed head coach Bob Williams that he would not return as head coach. Williams finished his 19-year career at the school as the school's all-time winningest coach with a record of 313–260. On March 30, it was announced that Arizona associate head coach and former New Orleans head coach Joe Pasternack had been hired as the next head coach.

== Previous season ==
The Gauchos finished the 2015–16 season 19–14, 11–5 in Big West play to finish in fourth place. They defeated UC Davis in the Big West tournament losing to Hawaii in the semifinals. They were invited to the inaugural Vegas 16 tournament, which only had eight teams, where they defeated Northern Illinois to advance to the semifinals where they lost to Old Dominion.

== Departures ==
Name	Number	Pos.	Height	Weight	Year	Hometown	Notes
T. J. Taylor	11	G	5'9"	160	Senior	Oakland, CA	Graduated
DaJuan Smith	13	G	6'3"	175	Senior	Abbeville, LA	Graduated
Mitch Brewe	21	F	6'8"	242	Senior	Seattle, WA	Graduated
Michael Bryson	24	G	6'4"	201	Senior	Sacramento, CA	Graduated
Justin Burks	25	G/F	6'6"	210	Freshman	Las Vegas, NV	Transferred
John Green	31	G/F	6'5"	180	RS Senior	Oakland, CA	Graduated
Joey Goodreault	43	G	6'3"	175	Freshman	Orinda, CA	Walk-on; left the team for personal reasons
Sam Beeler	44	F	6'10"	210	Senior	Poway, CA	Graduated

=== Incoming transfers ===
Name	Number	Pos.	Height	Weight	Year	Hometown	Notes
Jalen Canty	5	F	6'7"	230	Junior	Oakland, CA	Junior college transferred from City College of San Francisco

== 2016 incoming recruits ==
College recruiting information
Name	Hometown	School	Height	Weight	Commit date
Felix White #80 PF	Ojai, CA	Besant Hill School	6 ft 8 in (2.03 m)	220 lb (100 kg)	Oct 26, 2015
Felix White #80 PF	Recruit ratings: Scout: Rivals: (67)				
Christian Terrell #81 SF	Sacramento, CA	Sacramento High School	6 ft 4 in (1.93 m)	175 lb (79 kg)	Sep 9, 2015
Christian Terrell #81 SF	Recruit ratings: Scout: Rivals: (65)				
Clifton Powell; SG	Woodland Hills, CA	22ft Academy	6 ft 4 in (1.93 m)	175 lb (79 kg)	Sep 9, 2015
Clifton Powell; SG	Recruit ratings: Scout: Rivals: (65)				
Max Heidegger #72 PG	Encino, CA	Oaks Christian High School	5 ft 7 in (1.70 m)	145 lb (66 kg)	
Max Heidegger #72 PG	Recruit ratings: Scout: Rivals: (65)				
Overall recruit ranking:
Note: In many cases, Scout, Rivals, 247Sports, On3, and ESPN may conflict in their listings of height and weight.; In these cases, the average was taken. ESPN grades are on a 100-point scale.; Sources: "2016 Team Ranking". Rivals.

=== 2017 incoming recruits ===
College recruiting information (2017)
Name	Hometown	School	Height	Weight	Commit date
Marcus Shaver #57 PG	Phoenix, AZ	Saint Mary's High School	6 ft 2 in (1.88 m)	170 lb (77 kg)	Aug 17, 2016
Marcus Shaver #57 PG	Recruit ratings: Scout: Rivals: (75)				
Overall recruit ranking:
Note: In many cases, Scout, Rivals, 247Sports, On3, and ESPN may conflict in their listings of height and weight.; In these cases, the average was taken. ESPN grades are on a 100-point scale.; Sources: "2017 Team Ranking". Rivals.

== Roster ==
2016–17 UC Santa Barbara Gauchos men's basketball team
Players
Coaches

Pos.	#	Name	Height	Weight	Year	Previous school	Hometown
F	0	Jarriesse Blackmon	6 ft 7 in (2.01 m)	211 lb (96 kg)	RS So	Layton HS	Layton, UT
G	1	Eric Childress	6 ft 0 in (1.83 m)	190 lb (86 kg)	Sr	Leuzinger HS	Hawthorne, CA
G	2	Gabe Vincent	6 ft 3 in (1.91 m)	200 lb (91 kg)	Jr	St. Mary's HS	Stockton, CA
G	3	Clifton Powell	6 ft 5 in (1.96 m)	171 lb (78 kg)	Fr	Village Christian HS	Ladera Heights, CA
F	5	Jalen Canty	6 ft 8 in (2.03 m)	276 lb (125 kg)	Jr	St. Patrick-St. Vincent HS; City College of San Francisco	Vallejo, CA
F	10	Maxwell Kupchak	6 ft 7 in (2.01 m)	201 lb (91 kg)	So	Brentwood School	Los Angeles, CA
G	11	Tide Osifeso (W)	5 ft 10 in (1.78 m)	155 lb (70 kg)	So	Los Osos HS	Rancho Cucamonga, CA
F	12	Alex Hart	6 ft 10 in (2.08 m)	228 lb (103 kg)	Jr	Immaculata HS	Kelowna, B.C.
G	13	Sam Walters	6 ft 2 in (1.88 m)	170 lb (77 kg)	So	Soquel HS	Soquel, CA
F	14	Ami Lakoju	6 ft 8 in (2.03 m)	265 lb (120 kg)	So	St. Luke's School	Harlem, NY
G	21	Max Heidegger	6 ft 2 in (1.88 m)	181 lb (82 kg)	Fr	Oak Christian HS	Malibu, CA
G	23	Christian Terrell	6 ft 5 in (1.96 m)	195 lb (88 kg)	Fr	Besant Hill School (Ojai, Calif.)	Sacramento, CA
G	34	Scotty Harris (W)	6 ft 5 in (1.96 m)	190 lb (86 kg)	Fr	Woodside Priory	Portola Valley, CA
C	35	Tyler Jackson	7 ft 2 in (2.18 m)	284 lb (129 kg)	RS Fr	Phillip Exeter School	Oak Park, CA
F	43	J. D. Slajchert (W)	6 ft 6 in (1.98 m)	227 lb (103 kg)	So	South Kent (Conn.) School	Naperville, IL
F	44	Andrew Pickles (W)	6 ft 8 in (2.03 m)	210 lb (95 kg)	Fr	Mercer Island HS	Seattle, WA

Head coach

- Bob Williams (San José State)

Assistant coach(es)

- Matt Stock (UC Santa Barbara)
- Kevin Bromley (Colorado State)
- Ryan Madry (West Georgia)

Legend

- (C) Team captain
- (S) Suspended
- (I) Ineligible
- (W) Walk-on
- Injured
- Current redshirt

Roster

== Schedule and results ==
Date time, TV	Opponent	Result	Record	Site city, state
Exhibition
11/06/2016*; 1:00 pm	Fresno Pacific	W 82–62		The Thunderdome (1,608); Santa Barbara, CA
Non-conference regular season
11/12/2016*; 2:00 pm	Omaha	L 60–74	0–1	The Thunderdome (1,708); Santa Barbara, CA
11/16/2016*; 7:00 pm	San Francisco	L 63–75	0–2	The Thunderdome (1,563); Santa Barbara, CA
11/19/2016*; 7:00 pm	at Cal State Bakersfield	L 70–77	0–3	Icardo Center (1,897); Bakersfield, CA
11/22/2016*; 6:00 pm, ESPN3	at SMU	L 57–84	0–4	Moody Coliseum (6,852); Dallas, TX
11/27/2016*; 7:00 pm, P12N	at USC	L 72–96	0–5	Galen Center (2,892); Los Angeles, CA
12/01/2016*; 7:00 pm	Sonoma State	W 75–51	1–5	The Thunderdome (1,307); Santa Barbara, CA
12/11/2016*; 5:00 pm	at San Diego	L 68–77	1–6	Jenny Craig Pavilion (1,078); San Diego, CA
12/14/2016*; 7:30 pm, P12N	at No. 2 UCLA	L 62–102	1–7	Pauley Pavilion (7,484); Los Angeles, CA
12/21/2016*; 12:15 pm	vs. Iona; Las Vegas Holiday Hoops Classic semifinals	L 57–73	1–8	South Point Arena (175); Enterprise, NV
12/22/2016*; 2:30 pm	vs. Nevada; Las Vegas Holiday Hoops Classic 3rd place game	L 66–67	1–9	South Point Arena (264); Enterprise, NV
12/27/2016*; 7:00 pm	Cal State Bakersfield	W 62–60 ^{OT}	2–9	The Thunderdome (1,191); Santa Barbara, CA
12/30/2016*; 7:00 pm	Seattle	L 76–80	2–10	The Thunderdome (1,175); Santa Barbara, CA
Big West Conference regular season
01/04/2017; 7:00 pm	at UC Davis	L 47–73	2–11 (0–1)	The Pavilion (1,304); Davis, CA
01/12/2017; 7:00 pm	UC Irvine	L 62–66	2–12 (0–2)	The Thunderdome (3,056); Santa Barbara, CA
01/14/2017; 7:00 pm	Cal Poly	W 58–53	3–12 (1–2)	The Thunderdome (3,306); Santa Barbara, CA
01/19/2017; 7:30 pm, FS West	at Long Beach State	L 76–81	3–13 (1–3)	Walter Pyramid (3,017); Long Beach, CA
01/21/2017; 7:00 pm	at UC Riverside	L 55–65	3–14 (1–4)	The SRC (674); Riverside, CA
01/25/2017; 7:00 pm	Cal State Northridge	L 57–78	3–15 (1–5)	The Thunderdome (1,166); Santa Barbara, CA
01/28/2017; 9:30 pm	at Hawaii	L 56–78	3–16 (1–6)	Stan Sheriff Center (7,293); Honolulu, HI
02/02/2017; 7:00 pm	Cal State Fullerton	L 53–79	3–17 (1–7)	The Thunderdome (857); Santa Barbara, CA
02/04/2017; 7:00 pm, Prime Ticket	UC Davis	L 64–67	3–18 (1–8)	The Thunderdome (1,131); Santa Barbara, CA
02/08/2017; 7:00 pm, ESPN3	at UC Irvine	L 47–64	3–19 (1–9)	Bren Events Center (1,759); Irvine, CA
02/11/2017; 7:30 pm, Prime Ticket	at Cal State Northridge	L 55–77	3–20 (1–10)	Matadome (1,460); Northridge, CA
02/16/2017; 7:00 pm	Hawaii	W 56–54	4–20 (2–10)	The Thunderdome (1,416); Santa Barbara, CA
02/18/2017; 4:00 pm	Long Beach State	L 48–66	4–21 (2–11)	The Thunderdome (1,143); Santa Barbara, CA
02/23/2017; 7:00 pm	UC Riverside	W 68–61	5–21 (3–11)	The Thunderdome (1,618); Santa Barbara, CA
03/02/2017; 7:00 pm, ESPN3	at Cal State Fullerton	L 54–65	5–22 (3–12)	Titan Gym (1,205); Fullerton, CA
03/04/2017; 7:00 pm	at Cal Poly	W 57–44	6–22 (4–12)	Mott Athletic Center (2,950); San Luis Obispo, CA
*Non-conference game. ^{#}Rankings from AP Poll. (#) Tournament seedings in parentheses. All times are in Pacific Time (#) Tournament seedings in parentheses..
