= 2016–17 UC Davis Aggies men's basketball team =

American college basketball season

2016–17 UC Davis Aggies men's basketball
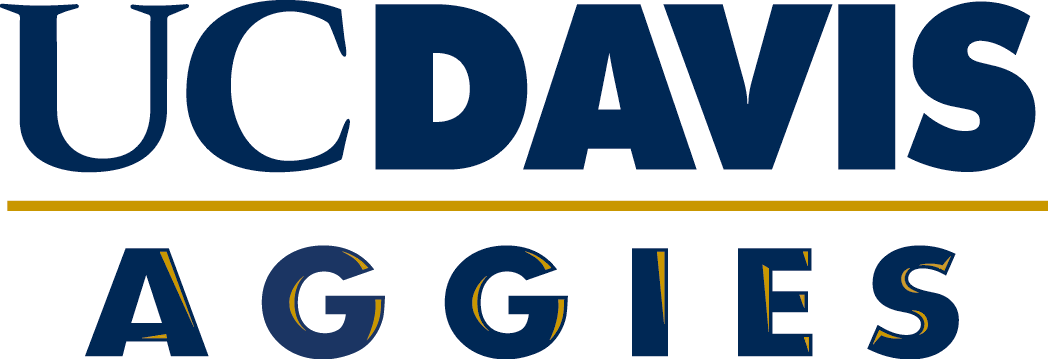

Big West tournament champions

NCAA tournament, First round
- Conference: Big West Conference
- Record: 23–13 (11–5 Big West)
- Head coach: Jim Les (6th season)
- Assistant coaches: Kyle Vogt; Chris Davis; Jonathan Metzger-Jones
- Home arena: The Pavilion

2016–17 Big West men's basketball standings
	Conf.				Overall
Team	W		L	PCT	W		L	PCT
UC Irvine	12	–	4	.750	21	–	15	.583
UC Davis †	11	–	5	.688	23	–	13	.639
Cal State Fullerton	10	–	6	.625	17	–	15	.531
Long Beach State	9	–	7	.563	15	–	19	.441
Hawai'i	8	–	8	.500	14	–	16	.467
Cal State Northridge	7	–	9	.438	11	–	19	.367
Cal Poly	6	–	10	.375	11	–	20	.355
UC Riverside	5	–	11	.313	7	–	21	.250
UC Santa Barbara	4	–	12	.250	6	–	22	.214
† 2017 Big West tournament winner

The 2016–17 UC Davis Aggies men's basketball team represented the University of California, Davis during the 2016–17 NCAA Division I men's basketball season. The Aggies, led by sixth-year head coach Jim Les, played their home games at The Pavilion as members of the Big West Conference. They finished the season 23–13, 11–5 in Big West play, to finish in second place. They defeated Cal Poly, Cal State Fullerton and UC Irvine to win the Big West tournament. As a result, they earned the conference's automatic bid to the NCAA tournament for the first time in school history as a No. 16 seed. They defeated North Carolina Central in the First Four before losing in the first round to Kansas.

== Previous season ==
The Aggies finished the 2015–16 season 11–19, 6–10 in Big West play, to finish in fifth place. They lost in the first round of the Big West tournament to UC Santa Barbara.

== Offseason ==
=== Departures ===
Name	Number	Pos.	Height	Weight	Year	Hometown	Notes
Luca Ferrari	14	G	6' 1"	180	RS Freshman	Studio City, CA	Walk-on; did not return
Josh Fox	21	F	6' 6"	210	Senior	Daly City, CA	Graduated
Neal Monson	22	C	6' 10"	230	Junior	Sandy, UT	Graduated
Nolan Berry	24	F/C	6' 10"	235	RS Junior	St. Louis, MO	Graduate transferred to Maryville

=== Incoming transfers ===
Name	Number	Pos.	Height	Weight	Year	Hometown	Notes
Arell Hennings	4	G	5' 9"	Junior	Seattle, WA	Junior college transferred from Cochise College	
A. J. John	25	F	6' 8"	225	Junior	Santa Rosa, CA	Transferred from Pepperdine. Under NCAA transfer rules, John will have to sit out for the 2016–17 season. Will have two years of remaining eligibility. Will join the team as a preferred walk-on.

=== 2016 recruiting class ===
College recruiting information
Name	Hometown	School	Height	Weight	Commit date
Peter Hewitt #72 PF	Mountain View, CA	Saint Francis High School	6 ft 9 in (2.06 m)	215 lb (98 kg)	Oct 4, 2015
Peter Hewitt #72 PF	Recruit ratings: Scout: Rivals: (69)				
Mikey Henn #102 PF	Bellevue, WA	Bellevue High School	6 ft 7 in (2.01 m)	220 lb (100 kg)	Oct 16, 2015
Mikey Henn #102 PF	Recruit ratings: Scout: Rivals: (60)				
Overall recruit ranking:
Note: In many cases, Scout, Rivals, 247Sports, On3, and ESPN may conflict in their listings of height and weight.; In these cases, the average was taken. ESPN grades are on a 100-point scale.; Sources: "2016 Team Ranking". Rivals.

=== 2017 recruiting class ===
College recruiting information (2017)
Name	Hometown	School	Height	Weight	Commit date
Logan Strom; PF	Norfolk, NE	Norfolk High School	6 ft 8 in (2.03 m)	240 lb (110 kg)	Sep 22, 2016
Logan Strom; PF	Recruit ratings: Scout: Rivals: (NR)				
Gio Nelson; SG	Corona, CA	Centennial High School	6 ft 5 in (1.96 m)	175 lb (79 kg)	Sep 24, 2016
Gio Nelson; SG	Recruit ratings: Scout: Rivals: (NR)				
T.J. Shorts; PG	Tustin, CA	Saddleback College	5 ft 10 in (1.78 m)	160 lb (73 kg)	
T.J. Shorts; PG	Recruit ratings: Scout: Rivals: (NR)				
Delveion Jackson; SG	Boise, ID	Centennial High School	6 ft 6 in (1.98 m)	195 lb (88 kg)	May 5, 2017
Delveion Jackson; SG	Recruit ratings: Scout: Rivals: (75)				
Overall recruit ranking:
Note: In many cases, Scout, Rivals, 247Sports, On3, and ESPN may conflict in their listings of height and weight.; In these cases, the average was taken. ESPN grades are on a 100-point scale.; Sources: "2017 Team Ranking". Rivals.

== Roster ==
2016–17 UC Davis Aggies men's basketball team
Players
Coaches

Pos.	#	Name	Height	Weight	Year	Previous school	Hometown
G	0	Brynton Lemar	6 ft 4 in (1.93 m)	195 lb (88 kg)	Sr	St. Augustine HS	San Diego, CA
G	1	Lawrence White	6 ft 4 in (1.93 m)	203 lb (92 kg)	Sr	Burroughs HS; Antelope Valley College	Burbank, CA
G	2	Darius Graham	5 ft 10 in (1.78 m)	180 lb (82 kg)	RS Sr	Sacramento HS	Sacramento, CA
G	4	Arell Hennings	5 ft 8 in (1.73 m)	150 lb (68 kg)	Jr	Franklin HS; Cochise College	Seattle, WA
G	5	Siler Schneider	6 ft 3 in (1.91 m)	183 lb (83 kg)	So	Lansing HS	Lansing, KS
F	11	Chima Moneke	6 ft 6 in (1.98 m)	223 lb (101 kg)	RS Jr	UCSSCLG; Northeast CC	Canberra, Australia
F	12	Georgi Funtarov	6 ft 8 in (2.03 m)	214 lb (97 kg)	Sr	Vermont Academy	Sofia, Bulgaria
F	13	J. T. Adenrele	6 ft 7 in (2.01 m)	235 lb (107 kg)	RS Sr	Oakmont HS	Roseville, CA
G	22	Joe Mooney	6 ft 3 in (1.91 m)	187 lb (85 kg)	RS Fr	Notre Dame College Prep	Wauconda, IL
G	23	Rogers Printup	6 ft 4 in (1.93 m)	205 lb (93 kg)	So	Orange Lutheran HS	Orange, CA
F	24	Mikey Henn	6 ft 8 in (2.03 m)	230 lb (104 kg)	Fr	Bellevue HS	Bellevue, WA
F	25	A. J. John (W, I) (redshirt)	6 ft 8 in (2.03 m)	225 lb (102 kg)	Jr	Maria Carrillo HS; Pepperdine	Santa Rosa, CA
G	31	Michael Onyebalu (W)	6 ft 3 in (1.91 m)	190 lb (86 kg)	So	Warren HS	Inglewood, CA
F	40	Peter Hewitt	6 ft 9 in (2.06 m)	215 lb (98 kg)	Fr	Saint Francis HS	Mountain View, CA
F	44	Garrison Goode	6 ft 7 in (2.01 m)	225 lb (102 kg)	So	Dominican HS	River Hills, WI

Head coach

- Jim Les (Bradley)

Assistant coach(es)

- Kevin Nosek (UC Davis)
- Kyle Vogt (Lakeland)
- Jonathan Metzger-Jones (Pacific)

Legend

- (C) Team captain
- (S) Suspended
- (I) Ineligible
- (W) Walk-on
- Injured
- Current redshirt

Roster
Last update: August 8, 2024

== Schedule and results ==
Date time, TV	Rank^{#}	Opponent^{#}	Result	Record	Site (attendance) city, state
Non-conference regular season
November 11, 2016*; 4:30 p.m.		vs. Tennessee State; Cable Car Classic	L 64–78	0–1	Leavey Center (1,821); Santa Clara, CA
November 12, 2016*; 6:00 p.m.		at Santa Clara; Cable Car Classic	W 63–58	1–1	Leavey Center (1,734); Santa Clara, CA
November 13, 2016*; 12:00 p.m.		vs. Northern Arizona; Cable Car Classic	W 89–76	2–1	Leavey Center (1,102); Santa Clara, CA
November 17, 2016*; 7:00 p.m.		Holy Names; Great Alaska Shootout opening round	W 89–75	3–1	The Pavilion (2,113); Davis, CA
November 21, 2016*; 5:30 p.m.		vs. Sacramento State; Sacramento Showcase	W 81–72	4–1	Golden 1 Center (10,104); Sacramento, CA
November 24, 2016*; 9:00 p.m., CBSSN		vs. Weber State; Great Alaska Shootout quarterfinal	L 58–86	4–2	Alaska Airlines Center (2,154); Anchorage, AK
November 25, 2016*; 3:00 p.m., CBSSN		vs. Drake; Great Alaska Shootout consolation 2nd round	W 64–58	5–2	Alaska Airlines Center (2,308); Anchorage, AK
November 26, 2016*; 3:00 p.m., CBSSN		vs. Oakland; Great Alaska Shootout 5th-place game	L 66–79	5–3	Alaska Airlines Center (2,150); Anchorage, AK
December 3, 2016*; 7:00 p.m.		at Idaho	L 66–68	5–4	Memorial Gym; Moscow, ID
December 10, 2016*; 7:30 p.m., P12N		at California	L 61–86	5–5	Haas Pavilion (8,664); Berkeley, CA
December 14, 2016*; 5:00 p.m., ESPN3		at North Dakota State	L 70–74	5–6	Scheels Center (2,921); Fargo, ND
December 17, 2016*; 2:00 p.m.		William Jessup	W 87–64	6–6	The Pavilion (823); Davis, CA
December 22, 2016*; 1:00 p.m.		at Air Force	L 67–77	6–7	Clune Arena (1,021); Colorado Springs, CO
December 28, 2016*; 7:00 p.m.		at Seattle	W 72–65	7–7	KeyArena (1,261); Seattle, WA
December 31, 2016*; 2:00 p.m.		Utah Valley	W 83–69	8–7	The Pavilion (787); Davis, CA
Big West Conference regular season
January 4, 2017; 7:00 p.m.		UC Santa Barbara	W 73–47	9–7 (1–0)	The Pavilion (1,304); Davis, CA
January 7, 2017; 7:00 p.m.		Cal Poly	W 68–64	10–7 (2–0)	The Pavilion (1,733); Davis, CA
January 12, 2017; 8:00 p.m., ESPN3		at UC Riverside	L 55–61	10–8 (2–1)	The SRC (897); Riverside, CA
January 14, 2017; 7:00 p.m., ESPNU		at Cal State Northridge	W 71–68	11–8 (3–1)	Matadome (1,057); Northridge, CA
January 21, 2017; 9:00 p.m.		at Hawaii	W 76–70	12–8 (4–1)	Stan Sheriff Center (6,982); Honolulu, HI
January 28, 2017; 5:00 p.m.		UC Irvine	W 74–65	13–8 (5–1)	The Pavilion (3,574); Davis, CA
February 2, 2017; 8:00 p.m.		at Cal Poly	L 70–74	13–9 (5–2)	Mott Athletic Center (1,850); San Luis Obispo, CA
February 4, 2017; 7:00 p.m., Prime Ticket		at UC Santa Barbara	W 67–64	14–9 (6–2)	UCSB Events Center (1,131); Santa Barbara, CA
February 8, 2017; 7:00 p.m.		Cal State Fullerton	W 74–65	15–9 (7–2)	The Pavilion (1,509); Davis, CA
February 11, 2017; 5:00 p.m.		UC Riverside	W 77–63	16–9 (8–2)	The Pavilion (2,607); Davis, CA
February 16, 2017; 7:00 p.m., ESPN3		at Long Beach State	L 69–78 ^{OT}	16–10 (8–3)	Walter Pyramid (2,554); Long Beach, CA
February 18, 2017; 7:30 p.m., Prime Ticket		at Cal State Fullerton	L 72–79	16–11 (8–4)	Titan Gym (1,138); Fullerton, CA
February 23, 2017; 7:00 p.m.		Cal State Northridge	W 96–85	17–11 (9–4)	The Pavilion (1,621); Davis, CA
February 25, 2017; 5:00 p.m., ESPNU		Long Beach State	W 75–71 ^{OT}	18–11 (10–4)	The Pavilion (5,873); Davis, CA
March 2, 2017; 7:00 p.m.		Hawaii	W 68–59	19–11 (11–4)	The Pavilion (2,023); Davis, CA
March 4, 2017; 3:00 p.m., Prime Ticket		at UC Irvine	L 49–79	19–12 (11–5)	Bren Events Center (4,384); Irvine, CA
Big West tournament
March 9, 2017; 12:00 p.m.	(2)	vs. (7) Cal Poly; Quarterfinal	W 66–55	20–12	Honda Center; Anaheim, CA
March 10, 2017; 9:00 p.m., ESPNU	(2)	vs. (3) Cal State Fullerton; Semifinal	W 66–64 ^{OT}	21–12	Honda Center (4,083); Anaheim, CA
March 11, 2017; 8:30 p.m., ESPN2	(2)	vs. (1) UC Irvine; Championship	W 50–47	22–12	Honda Center (5,085); Anaheim, CA
NCAA tournament
March 15, 2017*; 3:40 p.m., truTV	(16 MW)	vs. (16 MW) North Carolina Central; First Four	W 67–63	23–12	UD Arena (11,528); Dayton, OH
March 17, 2017*; 5:50 p.m., TNT	(16 MW)	vs. (1 MW) No. 3 Kansas; First round	L 62–100	23–13	BOK Center (14,715); Tulsa, OK
*Non-conference game. ^{#}Rankings from AP poll. (#) Tournament seedings in parentheses. MW=Midwest Region. All times are in Pacific.
