= 2017 Big West Conference men's basketball tournament =

- Classification: Division I
- Season: 2016–17
- Teams: 8
- Site: Honda Center; Anaheim, California
- Champions: UC Davis Aggies (1st title)
- Winning coach: Jim Les (1st title)
- MVP: Chima Moneke (UC-Davis)
- Television: Prime Ticket; ESPN3; ESPNU; ESPN2

2016–17 Big West men's basketball standings
	Conf.				Overall
Team	W		L	PCT	W		L	PCT
UC Irvine	12	–	4	.750	21	–	15	.583
UC Davis †	11	–	5	.688	23	–	13	.639
Cal State Fullerton	10	–	6	.625	17	–	15	.531
Long Beach State	9	–	7	.563	15	–	19	.441
Hawai'i	8	–	8	.500	14	–	16	.467
Cal State Northridge	7	–	9	.438	11	–	19	.367
Cal Poly	6	–	10	.375	11	–	20	.355
UC Riverside	5	–	11	.313	7	–	21	.250
UC Santa Barbara	4	–	12	.250	6	–	22	.214
† 2017 Big West tournament winner

The 2017 Big West Conference men's basketball tournament was the postseason men's basketball tournament for the Big West Conference. The tournament took place March 9–11, 2017 at the Honda Center in Anaheim, California. The tournament winner, UC Davis, received the conference's automatic bid to the NCAA tournament with a 50–47 win over UC Irvine in the final.

== Seeds ==
The top eight conference teams were eligible for the tournament. Teams were seeded by record within the conference, with a tiebreaker system to seed teams with identical conference records. Teams will reseed after the quarterfinals. Hawaii was initially banned from the postseason for infractions from the previous coaching staff but in the final week of the regular season, Hawaii won their appeal and were reinstated.

Seed	School	Conference
1	UC Irvine	12–4
2	UC Davis	11–5
3	Cal State Fullerton	10–6
4	Long Beach State	9–7
5	Hawaii	8–8
6	Cal State Northridge	7–9
7	Cal Poly	6–10
8	UC Riverside	5–11

== Schedule and results ==
Game	Time*	Matchup	Score	Television
Quarterfinals – Thursday, March 9
1	12:00 pm	No. 2 UC Davis vs No. 7 Cal Poly	66–55	Fox Sports West & Prime Ticket
2	2:30 pm	No. 3 Cal State Fullerton vs No. 6 Cal State Northridge	81–68	Fox Sports West & Prime Ticket
3	6:00 pm	No. 1 UC Irvine vs No. 8 UC Riverside	76–67	Fox Sports West & Prime Ticket
4	8:30 pm	No. 4 Long Beach State vs No. 5 Hawaii	73–62	Fox Sports West & Prime Ticket
Semifinals – Friday, March 10
5	6:30 pm	No.1 UC Irvine vs No. 4 Long Beach State	62–57	ESPN3
6	9:00 pm	No. 2 UC Davis vs No. 3 Cal State Fullerton	66–64^{OT}	ESPNU
Championship – Saturday, March 11
7	8:30 pm	No.1 UC Irvine vs No. 2 UC Davis	47–50	ESPN2
*Game times in PT. #-Rankings denote tournament seeding. All games held at Honda Center, Anaheim, CA

== Bracket ==
Quarterfinals; Thursday, March 9 FS West and FS Prime Ticket
1	UC Irvine	76
8	UC Riverside	67
4	Long Beach State	73
5	Hawaii	62
(Pairings are reseeded after the first round)
2	UC Davis	66
7	Cal Poly	55
3	Cal State Fullerton	81
6	Cal State Northridge	68

Semifinals; Friday, March 10; ESPNU and ESPN3 (re-seeded)
1	UC Irvine	62
4	Long Beach State	57
2	UC Davis	66*
3	Cal State Fullerton	64

Championship; Saturday, March 11; ESPN2
1	UC Irvine	47
2	UC Davis	50
