= 2016–17 Hawaii Rainbow Warriors basketball team =

American college basketball season

2016–17 Hawaii Rainbow Warriors basketball
- Conference: Big West Conference
- Record: 14–16 (8–8 Big West)
- Head coach: Eran Ganot (2nd season)
- Assistant coaches: Adam Jacobsen; Chris Acker (2nd season); John Montgomery; Todd Okeson (Director of Basketball Operations)
- Captains: Noah Allen; Mike Thomas
- Home arena: Stan Sheriff Center

2016–17 Big West men's basketball standings
	Conf.				Overall
Team	W		L	PCT	W		L	PCT
UC Irvine	12	–	4	.750	21	–	15	.583
UC Davis †	11	–	5	.688	23	–	13	.639
Cal State Fullerton	10	–	6	.625	17	–	15	.531
Long Beach State	9	–	7	.563	15	–	19	.441
Hawai'i	8	–	8	.500	14	–	16	.467
Cal State Northridge	7	–	9	.438	11	–	19	.367
Cal Poly	6	–	10	.375	11	–	20	.355
UC Riverside	5	–	11	.313	7	–	21	.250
UC Santa Barbara	4	–	12	.250	6	–	22	.214
† 2017 Big West tournament winner

The 2016–17 Hawaii Rainbow Warriors basketball team represented the University of Hawaii at Manoa during the 2016–17 NCAA Division I men's basketball season. The Rainbow Warriors, led by second-year head coach Eran Ganot, played their home games at the Stan Sheriff Center in Honolulu, Hawaii as members of the Big West Conference. They finished the season 14–16, 8–8 in Big West play to finish in fifth place. They lost in the quarterfinals of the Big West tournament to Long Beach State.

The Stan Sheriff Center saw its second consecutive season with a sellout (announced turnstile 9,211 out of 10,300) in an 83–68 defeat versus No. 5 North Carolina, the first instance since 1996–97 and 1997–98.

== Previous season ==
The Rainbow Warriors finished the 2015–16 season 28–6, 13–3 in Big West play to finish in a tie for the Big West regular-season title. They defeated the Long Beach State 49ers, the only team to sweep the Rainbow Warriors, in the finals of the Big West tournament.

The team, as a #13 seed in the 2016 NCAA tournament, defeated #4 California, 77–66, before bowing out to Maryland, a #5 seed, 73–60 in the second round.

== Departures ==
Name	Number	Pos.	Height	Weight	Year	Hometown	Notes
Issac Fleming	0	G	6'3"	180	Sophomore	Wilmington, DE	Transferred to East Carolina
Niko Filipovich	2	G	6'0"	160	RS Sophomore	Rancho Palos Verdes, CA	Walk-on; left the team for personal reasons
Rodrick Bobbitt	5	G	6'3"	205	Senior	Castro Valley, CA	Graduated
Dyrbe Enos	10	G	5'10"	170	RS Junior	Aiea, HI	Walk-on; left the team to finish degree and forego fifth year
Quincy Smith	11	G	6'1"	180	Senior	Antioch, CA	Graduated
Sai Tummala	12	G	6'6"	218	Senior	Phoenix, AZ	Graduated
Jakob Cornelissen	13	G	6'1"	165	Freshman	Melbourne, Australia	Walk-on; didn't return
Stefan Jovanovic	15	C	6'10"	235	Junior	Kraljevo, Serbia	Graduate transferred to Loyola Marymount
Aaron Valdes	32	G	6'5"	190	Junior	Whitter, CA	Declared for 2016 NBA draft
Stefan Janković	33	F	6'11"	235	Junior	Mississauga, ON	Declared for 2016 NBA draft

=== Incoming transfers ===
Name	Number	Pos.	Height	Weight	Year	Hometown	Notes
Brian Garrett	20	G	6'4"	180	Junior	San Carlos, CA	Junior college transferred from Cañada College
Gibson Johnson	21	F	6'8"	225	Junior	Centerville, UT	Junior college transferred from Salt Lake CC

== 2016 Recruiting ==
College recruiting information
Name	Hometown	School	Height	Weight	Commit date
Drew Buggs #56 PG	Long Beach, CA	Polytechnic High School	6 ft 2 in (1.88 m)	175 lb (79 kg)	Sep 30, 2015
Drew Buggs #56 PG	Recruit ratings: Scout: Rivals: (70)				
Ido Flaisher; PF	Herzliya, Israel	Hadash High School	6 ft 10 in (2.08 m)	225 lb (102 kg)	Sep 26, 2016
Ido Flaisher; PF	Recruit ratings: Scout: Rivals: (0)				
Leland Green; SG	Redondo Beach, CA	Redondo Beach High School	6 ft 1 in (1.85 m)	185 lb (84 kg)	Apr 28, 2016
Leland Green; SG	Recruit ratings: Scout: Rivals: (70)				
Matt Owies; PG	Melbourne, Australia	St. Kevin's College	6 ft 0 in (1.83 m)	185 lb (84 kg)	Sep 24, 2015
Matt Owies; PG	Recruit ratings: Scout: Rivals: (70)				
Zigmars Raimo; PF	Madona, Latvia	Riga Secondary School No.49	6 ft 7 in (2.01 m)	245 lb (111 kg)	May 5, 2016
Zigmars Raimo; PF	Recruit ratings: Scout: Rivals: (0)				
Overall recruit ranking:
Note: In many cases, Scout, Rivals, 247Sports, On3, and ESPN may conflict in their listings of height and weight.; In these cases, the average was taken. ESPN grades are on a 100-point scale.; Sources: "2016 Team Ranking". Rivals.

=== 2017 Commitments ===
College recruiting information (2017)
Name	Hometown	School	Height	Weight	Commit date
Samuta Avea; SF	Kahuku, HI	Kahuku High SChool	6 ft 6 in (1.98 m)	190 lb (86 kg)	Nov 16, 2016
Samuta Avea; SF	Recruit ratings: Scout: Rivals: 247Sports: ESPN:				
Overall recruit ranking:
Note: In many cases, Scout, Rivals, 247Sports, On3, and ESPN may conflict in their listings of height and weight.; In these cases, the average was taken. ESPN grades are on a 100-point scale.; Sources:

== Roster ==
2016–17 Hawaii Rainbow Warriors men's basketball team
Players
Coaches

Pos.	#	Name	Height	Weight	Year	Previous school	Hometown
G	0	Leland Green	6 ft 2 in (1.88 m)	175 lb (79 kg)	Fr	Redondo Union HS	Los Angeles, CA
F	1	Mike Thomas (C)	6 ft 7 in (2.01 m)	225 lb (102 kg)	Sr	El Camino HS	Woodland Hills, CA
G	2	Brocke Stepteau	5 ft 9 in (1.75 m)	160 lb (73 kg)	So	Dallas Jesuit Prep School	Dallas, TX
G	3	Drew Buggs	6 ft 2 in (1.88 m)	190 lb (86 kg)	Fr	Long Beach Poly HS	Long Beach, CA
F	4	Darryl Matthews	6 ft 5 in (1.96 m)	215 lb (98 kg)	Jr	St. John Bosco HS; West Los Angeles College	Los Angeles, CA
G	5	Matthew Owies	6 ft 0 in (1.83 m)	180 lb (82 kg)	Fr	St Kevin's College	Melbourne, Australia
F	12	Jack Purchase	6 ft 8 in (2.03 m)	200 lb (91 kg)	So	Carey Grammar; Auburn	Melbourne, Australia
F	14	Zigmars Raimo	6 ft 7 in (2.01 m)	245 lb (111 kg)	Fr	Riga Secondary School No. 49	Madona, Latvia
C	15	Ido Flaisher	6 ft 10 in (2.08 m)	225 lb (102 kg)	Fr	Hadash HS	Herzliya, Israel
G	20	Brian Garrett	6 ft 4 in (1.93 m)	180 lb (82 kg)	Jr	St. Francis HS; Cañada College	San Carlos, CA
F	21	Gibson Johnson	6 ft 8 in (2.03 m)	220 lb (100 kg)	Jr	Viewmont HS; Salt Lake CC	Centerville, UT
G	23	Sheriff Drammeh	6 ft 3 in (1.91 m)	160 lb (73 kg)	So	Igelstavikens Gymnasium	Stockholm, Sweden
G	24	Zach Buscher	6 ft 3 in (1.91 m)	175 lb (79 kg)	So	ʻIolani School	Kailua, HI
G/F	32	Noah Allen (C)	6 ft 7 in (2.01 m)	215 lb (98 kg)	Sr	Palma School; UCLA	Pacific Grove, CA
G	34	Larry Lewis Jr.	6 ft 3 in (1.91 m)	180 lb (82 kg)	Jr	Arcadia HS; Odessa College	Milwaukee, WI

Head coach

- Eran Ganot (Swarthmore College)

Assistant coach(es)

- Adam Jacobsen (Pacific)
- Chris Acker (Chaminade)
- John Montgomery (Loyola Marymount)
- Todd Okeson (Nevada) - Director of Basketball Operations

Legend

- (C) Team captain
- (S) Suspended
- (I) Ineligible
- (W) Walk-on
- Injured
- Current redshirt

Roster

== Schedule and results ==
Date time, TV	Rank^{#}	Opponent^{#}	Result	Record	Site (attendance) city, state
Exhibition
11/03/2016; 7:00 pm		BYU-Hawaii	W 97–74		Stan Sheriff Center (4,736); Honolulu, HI
Non-conference regular season
11/11/2016*; 9:00 pm, OC Sports		SIU Edwardsville; Outrigger Resorts Rainbow Classic	L 68–69	0–1	Stan Sheriff Center (5,423); Honolulu, HI
11/13/2016*; 5:30 pm, OC Sports		Texas State; Outrigger Resorts Rainbow Classic	W 74–68	1–1	Stan Sheriff Center (5,309); Honolulu, HI
11/14/2016*; 11:15 pm, ESPN2		Florida Atlantic; Outrigger Resorts Rainbow Classic/Tip-Off Marathon	W 64–63	2–1	Stan Sheriff Center (5,334); Honolulu, HI
11/18/2016*; 8:00 pm, OC Sports		No. 5 North Carolina	L 68–83	2–2	Stan Sheriff Center (10,300); Honolulu, HI
11/22/2016*; 7:00 pm, OC Sports		UH-Hilo	W 86–55	3–2	Stan Sheriff Center (4,890); Honolulu, HI
11/25/2016*; 8:00 pm, OC Sports		Troy	L 63–65	3–3	Stan Sheriff Center (5,838); Honolulu, HI
11/27/2016*; 7:00 pm, OC Sports		Arkansas–Pine Bluff	W 64–44	4–3	Stan Sheriff Center (5,508); Honolulu, HI
12/06/2016*; 4:30 pm, FS1		vs. Seton Hall; Pearl Harbor Invitational	L 57–68	4–4	Bloch Arena (4,024); Joint Base Pearl Harbor-Hickam, HI
12/07/2016*; 4:30 pm, FS1		vs. Princeton; Pearl Harbor Invitational	L 62–75	4–5	Bloch Arena (4,024); Joint Base Pearl Harbor-Hickam, HI
12/22/2016*; 8:30 pm, ESPN2		Illinois State; Diamond Head Classic quarterfinals	L 45–71	4–6	Stan Sheriff Center (6,659); Honolulu, HI
12/23/2016*; 7:30 pm, ESPNU		Utah; Diamond Head Classic consolation 2nd round	L 52–66	4–7	Stan Sheriff Center (6,053); Honolulu, HI
12/25/2016*; 9:30 am, ESPNU		Southern Miss; Diamond Head Classic 7th place game	W 60–46	5–7	Stan Sheriff Center (5,769); Honolulu, HI
12/29/2016*; 8:00 pm, OC Sports		Delaware State	W 77–66	6–7	Stan Sheriff Center (5,903); Honolulu, HI
Big West Conference regular season
01/05/2017; 5:00 pm, ESPN3		at Cal State Fullerton	L 64–67	6–8 (0–1)	Titan Gym (724); Fullerton, CA
01/07/2017; 5:00 pm, Prime Ticket		at UC Irvine	L 56–84	6–9 (0–2)	Bren Events Center (2,359); Irvine, CA
01/14/2017; 7:00 pm, OC Sports		Long Beach State	W 114–107 ^{OT}	7–9 (1–2)	Stan Sheriff Center (5,911); Honolulu, HI
01/18/2017; 7:00 pm, OC Sports		Cal State Northridge	W 80–77	8–9 (2–2)	Stan Sheriff Center (5,309); Honolulu, HI
01/21/2017; 7:00 pm, OC Sports		UC Davis	L 70–76	8–10 (2–3)	Stan Sheriff Center (6,982); Honolulu, HI
01/25/2017; 7:00 pm, OC Sports		UC Riverside	L 64–70	8–11 (2–4)	Stan Sheriff Center (5,465); Honolulu, HI
01/28/2017; 7:30 pm, OC Sports		UC Santa Barbara	W 78–56	9–11 (3–4)	Stan Sheriff Center (7,293); Honolulu, HI
02/02/2017; 6:00 pm, ESPN3		at UC Riverside	W 72–63	10–11 (4–4)	The SRC (1,252); Riverside, CA
02/04/2017; 5:00 pm, Prime Ticket		at Cal State Northridge	W 76–72	11–11 (5–4)	Matadome (1,085); Northridge, CA
02/09/2017; 7:00 pm, OC Sports		Cal Poly	W 74–65	12–11 (6–4)	Stan Sheriff Center (5,596); Honolulu, HI
02/11/2017; 7:30 pm, OC Sports		UC Irvine	L 58–72	12–12 (6–5)	Stan Sheriff Center (7,452); Honolulu, HI
02/16/2017; 5:00 pm		at UC Santa Barbara	L 54–56	12–13 (6–6)	The Thunderdome (1416); Santa Barbara, CA
02/18/2017; 5:00 pm		at Cal Poly	W 82–61	13–13 (7–6)	Mott Gym; San Luis Obispo, CA
02/25/2017; 7:00 pm, OC Sports		Cal State Fullerton	W 64–58	14–13 (8–6)	Stan Sheriff Center; Honolulu, HI
03/02/2017; 5:00 pm		at UC Davis	L 59–68	14–14 (8–7)	The Pavilion (2,023); Davis, CA
03/04/2017; 3:00 pm, ESPN3		at Long Beach State	L 75–84	14–15 (8–8)	Walter Pyramid (3,021); Long Beach, CA
Big West tournament
03/09/2017; 8:30 pm	(5)	vs. (4) Long Beach State; Quarterfinals	L 62–73	14–16	Honda Center (3,486); Anaheim, CA
*Non-conference game. ^{#}Rankings from AP Poll. (#) Tournament seedings in parentheses.
