= 2016–17 Cal Poly Mustangs men's basketball team =

American college basketball season

2016–17 Cal Poly Mustangs men's basketball
- Conference: Big West
- Record: 11–20 (6–10 Big West)
- Head coach: Joe Callero (8th season)
- Assistant coaches: Pawel Mrozik; Sam Kirby; Mitch Reaves
- Home arena: Mott Athletic Center

2016–17 Big West men's basketball standings
| | Conf. | | | | Overall |
| Team | W | | L | PCT | W | | L | PCT |
|---|---|---|---|---|---|---|---|---|
| UC Irvine | 12 | – | 4 | .750 | 21 | – | 15 | .583 |
| UC Davis † | 11 | – | 5 | .688 | 23 | – | 13 | .639 |
| Cal State Fullerton | 10 | – | 6 | .625 | 17 | – | 15 | .531 |
| Long Beach State | 9 | – | 7 | .563 | 15 | – | 19 | .441 |
| Hawai'i | 8 | – | 8 | .500 | 14 | – | 16 | .467 |
| Cal State Northridge | 7 | – | 9 | .438 | 11 | – | 19 | .367 |
| Cal Poly | 6 | – | 10 | .375 | 11 | – | 20 | .355 |
| UC Riverside | 5 | – | 11 | .313 | 7 | – | 21 | .250 |
| UC Santa Barbara | 4 | – | 12 | .250 | 6 | – | 22 | .214 |
† 2017 Big West tournament winner

The 2016–17 Cal Poly Mustangs men's basketball team represented the California Polytechnic State University in the 2016–17 NCAA Division I men's basketball season. The Mustangs, led by eighth-year head coach Joe Callero, played their home games at Mott Athletic Center as members of the Big West Conference. They finished the season 11–20, 6–10 in Big West play to finish in seventh place. They lost to UC Davis in the quarterfinals of the Big West tournament.

== Previous season ==
The Mustangs finished the 2015–16 season 10–20, 4–12 in Big West play to finish in eighth place. They lost in the quarterfinals of the Big West tournament to UC Irvine.

== Offseason ==
=== Departures ===
| Name | Number | Pos. | Height | Weight | Year | Hometown | Notes |
|---|---|---|---|---|---|---|---|
| David Nwaba | 0 | G | 6'4" | 210 | Senior | Los Angeles, CA | Graduated |
| Reese Morgan | 5 | G | 6'2" | 200 | Senior | San Pedro, CA | Graduated |
| Mark Patterson | 14 | G | 6'1" | 174 | Sophomore | Bellflower, CA | Walk-on; transferred |
| Serigne Athj | 24 | F | 6'4" | 195 | Freshman | Pasadena, CA | Transferred to Peninsula College |
| Joel Awich | 25 | F | 6'7" | 217 | Senior | St. Paul, MN | Graduated |
| Brian Bennett | 34 | F | 6'9" | 288 | Senior | Plainfield, IL | Graduated |

=== Incoming transfers ===
| Name | Number | Pos. | Height | Weight | Year | Hometown | Notes |
|---|---|---|---|---|---|---|---|
| Donovan Fields | 3 | G | 5'10" | | Sophomore | Newburgh, NY | Junior college transferred from Odessa College |
| Victor Joseph | 20 | G | 6'0" | 150 | Junior | Rancho Cucamonga, CA | Junior college transferred to Chaffey College |

=== 2016 recruiting class ===
College recruiting information
| Name | Hometown | School | Height | Weight | Commit date |
|---|---|---|---|---|---|
| Mark Crowe; SG | Dallas, TX | Wilson High School | 6 ft 5 in (1.96 m) | N/A | Oct 4, 2015 |
| Mark Crowe; SG | Recruit ratings: Scout: Rivals: 247Sports: ESPN: | | | | |
Overall recruit ranking:
Note: In many cases, Scout, Rivals, 247Sports, On3, and ESPN may conflict in their listings of height and weight.; In these cases, the average was taken. ESPN grades are on a 100-point scale.; Sources: "Cal Poly 2016 Basketball Commitments". Rivals.; "2016 Cal Poly Commits". Scout.; "ESPN". ESPN.; "Scout.com Team Recruiting Rankings". Scout.; "2016 Team Ranking". Rivals.

== Roster ==
2016–17 Cal Poly Mustangs men's basketball team
Players
Coaches

| Pos. | # | Name | Height | Weight | Year | Previous school | Hometown |
|---|---|---|---|---|---|---|---|
| F | 1 | Aleks Abrams | 6 ft 8 in (2.03 m) | 265 lb (120 kg) | Jr | Oaks Christian School | Westlake Village, California |
| G | 2 | Trevor John | 6 ft 3 in (1.91 m) | 183 lb (83 kg) | RS So | Monte Vista HS | Danville, California |
| G | 3 | Donovan Fields | 5 ft 10 in (1.78 m) | 160 lb (73 kg) | So | Newburgh Free Academy; Odessa College | Newburgh, New York |
| G | 4 | Jaylen Shead | 6 ft 1 in (1.85 m) | 190 lb (86 kg) | So | Connally HS | Pflugerville, Texas |
| G/F | 5 | Mark Crowe | 6 ft 5 in (1.96 m) | 180 lb (82 kg) | Fr | Wilson HS | Dallas, Texas |
| G | 10 | Ridge Shipley | 6 ft 0 in (1.83 m) | 185 lb (84 kg) | Sr | Hebron HS | Carrollton, Texas |
| G | 11 | Taylor Sutlive | 6 ft 3 in (1.91 m) | 194 lb (88 kg) | RS Jr | Churchill HS | San Antonio, Texas |
| G | 13 | Kyle Toth | 6 ft 2 in (1.88 m) | 175 lb (79 kg) | RS Sr | Mitty HS; Army | Sunnyvale, California |
| F | 15 | Josh Martin | 6 ft 8 in (2.03 m) | 212 lb (96 kg) | Jr | Bothell HS; Minnesota | Seattle, Washington |
| G | 20 | Victor Joseph | 6 ft 0 in (1.83 m) | 170 lb (77 kg) | Jr | Rancho Cucamonga HS; Chaffey College | Rancho Cucamonga, California |
| F | 21 | Luke Meikle | 6 ft 9 in (2.06 m) | 209 lb (95 kg) | RS Jr | Bellarmine Prep | Tacoma, Washington |
| G | 23 | Alec Raven | 6 ft 5 in (1.96 m) | 193 lb (88 kg) | So | Montgomery HS | Santa Rosa, California |
| C | 30 | Hank Hollingsworth | 6 ft 10 in (2.08 m) | 235 lb (107 kg) | Fr | Chelan HS | Chelan, Washington |
| F | 35 | Jakub Niziol | 6 ft 7 in (2.01 m) | 210 lb (95 kg) | So | Howard College | Wrocław, Poland |
| F | 44 | Zach Gordon | 6 ft 8 in (2.03 m) | 239 lb (108 kg) | RS Sr | Archbishop Murphy HS | Lynnwood, Washington |

Head coach

- Joe Callero (Central Washington)

Assistant coach(es)

- Pawel Mrozik (Polish Open)
- Sam Kirby (Seattle)
- Mitch Reaves (Washington State)

Legend

- (C) Team captain
- (S) Suspended
- (I) Ineligible
- (W) Walk-on
- Injured
- Current redshirt

Roster

== Schedule and results ==
| Date time, TV | Rank^{#} | Opponent^{#} | Result | Record | High points | High rebounds | High assists | Site (attendance) city, state |
Non-conference regular season
| 11/11/2016*; 7:00 pm | | at Pepperdine | L 68–77 | 0–1 | 17 – Tied | 21 – Martin | 6 – Shead | Firestone Fieldhouse (1,320); Malibu, CA |
| 11/13/2016*; 6:00 pm, P12N | | at Arizona State | L 74–96 | 0–2 | 21 – Toth | 7 – Martin | 7 – Shead | Wells Fargo Arena (4,155); Tempe, AZ |
| 11/17/2016*; 7:00 pm | | Cal State Dominguez Hills | W 75–64 | 1–2 | 16 – Martin | 6 – Martin | 6 – Martin | Mott Athletic Center (824); San Luis Obispo, CA |
| 11/19/2016*; 2:00 pm | | Bethesda | W 69–52 | 2–2 | 15 – Fields | 10 – Meikle | 6 – Shead | Mott Athletic Center (1,342); San Luis Obispo, CA |
| 11/23/2016*; 5:00 pm | | at Northern Illinois; NIU Thanksgiving Classic | W 68–64 | 3–2 | 19 – Joseph | 4 – 3 Tied | 6 – Shead | Convocation Center (844); DeKalb, IL |
| 11/25/2016*; 1:30 pm | | vs. UIC; NIU Thanksgiving Classic | L 71–84 | 3–3 | 24 – Dixson | 6 – 3 Tied | 3 – Tied | Convocation Center; DeKalb, IL |
| 11/26/2016*; 11:00 am | | vs. Elon; NIU Thanksgiving Classic | L 66–72 | 3–4 | 23 – Joseph | 8 – Shead | 7 – Shead | Convocation Center; DeKalb, IL |
| 12/01/2016*; 8:00 pm | | UTSA | W 59–47 | 4–4 | 18 – Toth | 5 – 3 Tied | 7 – Shead | Mott Athletic Center (1,050); San Luis Obispo, CA |
| 12/03/2016*; 7:00 pm | | Texas A&M–Corpus Christi | W 82–70 | 5–4 | 19 – Joseph | 8 – Hollingsworth | 7 – Shipley | Mott Athletic Center (1,347); San Luis Obispo, CA |
| 12/10/2016*; 4:00 pm | | at Fresno State | L 59–73 | 5–5 | 17 – Fields | 6 – Shead | 5 – Shipley | Save Mart Center (7,250); Fresno, CA |
| 12/17/2016*; 5:00 pm, P12N | | at California | L 55–81 | 5–6 | 14 – Toth | 16 – Abrams | 2 – Meikle | Haas Pavilion (9.698); Berkeley, CA |
| 12/20/2016*; 8:00 pm, P12N | | at Washington | L 61–77 | 5–7 | 14 – Shipley | 7 – Gordon | 6 – Shipley | Alaska Airlines Arena (7,175); Seattle, WA |
| 12/28/2016*; 6:00 pm, ESPN3 | | at Grand Canyon | L 64–71 | 5–8 | 22 – Meikle | 9 – Abrams | 5 – Toth | GCU Arena (6,757); Phoenix, AZ |
| 12/31/2016*; 10:00 am | | at Princeton | L 52–81 | 5–9 | 8 – Toth | 7 – Meikle | 3 – Shipley | Jadwin Gymnasium (2,022); Princeton, NJ |
Big West regular season
| 01/07/2017; 7:00 pm | | at UC Davis | L 64–68 | 5–10 (0–1) | 16 – Meikle | 14 – Gordon | 4 – Toth | The Pavilion (1,733); Davis, CA |
| 01/12/2017; 7:00 pm | | Cal State Fullerton | L 74–87 | 5–11 (0–2) | 15 – Fields | 5 – Abrams | 8 – Shipley | Mott Athletic Center (1,350); San Luis Obispo, CA |
| 01/14/2017; 7:00 pm | | at UC Santa Barbara | L 53–58 | 5–12 (0–3) | 15 – Fields | 5 – Meikle | 4 – Toth | The Thunderdome (3,306); Santa Barbara, CA |
| 01/18/2017; 7:00 pm | | UC Irvine | L 48–70 | 5–13 (0–4) | 11 – Niziol | 12 – Abrams | 1 – Shipley | Mott Athletic Center (1,250); San Luis Obispo, CA |
| 01/21/2017; 7:00 pm, ESPNU | | Long Beach State | L 92–98 ^{OT} | 5–14 (0–5) | 27 – Shipley | 8 – Toth | 4 – Shipley | Mott Athletic Center (3,032); San Luis Obispo, CA |
| 01/26/2017; 7:00 pm, ESPN3 | | at UC Irvine | W 79–66 | 6–14 (1–6) | 22 – Joseph | 6 – Meikle | 3 – Shipley | Bren Events Center (2,107); Irvine, CA |
| 01/28/2017; 6:00 pm, ESPN3 | | at Cal State Fullerton | L 71–81 | 6–15 (1–6) | 22 – Joseph | 5 – Gordon | 5 – Shipley | Titan Gym (1,024); Fullerton, CA |
| 02/02/2017; 8:00 pm | | UC Davis | W 74–70 | 7–15 (2–6) | 20 – Joseph | 5 – Shipley | 6 – Fields | Mott Athletic Center (1,850); San Luis Obispo, CA |
| 02/04/2017; 7:00 pm | | UC Riverside | L 56–67 ^{OT} | 10–18 (5–9) | 22 – Joseph | 12 – Gordon | 4 – Shipley | Mott Athletic Center (2,150); San Luis Obispo, CA |
| 02/09/2017; 10:00 pm | | at Hawaii | L 65–74 | 7–17 (2–8) | 19 – Shipley | 9 – Gordon | 2 – Joseph | Stan Sheriff Center (5,596); Honolulu, HI |
| 02/15/2017; 7:00 pm, ESPN3 | | at Cal State Northridge | W 85–71 | 8–17 (3–8) | 23 – Fields | 8 – Niziol | 4 – Fields | Matadome (405); Northridge, CA |
| 02/18/2017; 7:00 pm | | Hawaii | L 61–82 | 8–18 (3–9) | 16 – Shipley | 6 – Meikle | 2 – Toth | Mott Athletic Center (2,317); San Luis Obispo, CA |
| 02/23/2017; 7:00 pm, ESPN3 | | at Long Beach State | W 78–71 | 9–18 (4–9) | 17 – Shipley | 11 – Meikle | 6 – Shipley | Walter Pyramid (3,164); Long Beach, CA |
| 02/25/2017; 5:00 pm, Prime Ticket | | at UC Riverside | W 84–77 ^{OT} | 10–18 (5–9) | 26 – Joseph | 11 – Gordon | 8 – Shipley | SRC Center (555); Riverside, CA |
| 03/02/2017; 7:00 pm | | Cal State Northridge | W 76–70 | 11–18 (6–9) | 17 – Shipley | 8 – Gordon | 4 – Shipley | Mott Athletic Center (1,280); San Luis Obispo, CA |
| 03/04/2017; 7:00 pm | | UC Santa Barbara | L 44–57 | 11–19 (6–10) | 10 – Fields | 9 – Gordon | 3 – Fields | Mott Athletic Center (2,950); San Luis Obispo, CA |
Big West tournament
| 03/09/2017; 12:00 pm | (7) | vs. (2) UC Davis; Quarterfinals | L 55–66 | 11–20 | 19 – Shipley | 12 – Gordon | 3 – Fields | Honda Center; Anaheim, CA |
*Non-conference game. ^{#}Rankings from AP Poll. (#) Tournament seedings in parentheses. All times are in Pacific Time.

== See also ==
- 2016–17 Cal Poly Mustangs women's basketball team
