= Carl Rodwell =

Australian basketball player

Personal information
- Born: 12 May 1944 (age 82) Cowra, Australia
- Listed height: 6 ft 8 in (2.03 m)
- Listed weight: 200 lb (91 kg)

Career information
- College: UC Riverside (1965–1969)
- NBA draft: 1969: 20th round, 217th overall pick
- Drafted by: Atlanta Hawks
- Position: Forward
- Stats at Basketball Reference

Clifford Carl Rodwell (born 12 May 1944) is an Australian former basketball player. He competed in the men's tournament at the 1964 Summer Olympics.

Rodwell played college basketball for the UC Riverside Highlanders from 1965 to 1969. He was selected in the 20th round of the 1969 NBA draft by the Atlanta Hawks.
