= 2016–17 UC Riverside Highlanders men's basketball team =

American college basketball season

2016–17 UC Riverside Highlanders men's basketball
- Conference: Big West Conference
- Record: 7–21 (5–11 Big West)
- Head coach: Dennis Cutts (4th season)
- Assistant coaches: Justin Bell; Keith Wilkinson; Will Kimble
- Home arena: Student Recreation Center Arena

2016–17 Big West men's basketball standings
| | Conf. | | | | Overall |
| Team | W | | L | PCT | W | | L | PCT |
|---|---|---|---|---|---|---|---|---|
| UC Irvine | 12 | – | 4 | .750 | 21 | – | 15 | .583 |
| UC Davis † | 11 | – | 5 | .688 | 23 | – | 13 | .639 |
| Cal State Fullerton | 10 | – | 6 | .625 | 17 | – | 15 | .531 |
| Long Beach State | 9 | – | 7 | .563 | 15 | – | 19 | .441 |
| Hawai'i | 8 | – | 8 | .500 | 14 | – | 16 | .467 |
| Cal State Northridge | 7 | – | 9 | .438 | 11 | – | 19 | .367 |
| Cal Poly | 6 | – | 10 | .375 | 11 | – | 20 | .355 |
| UC Riverside | 5 | – | 11 | .313 | 7 | – | 21 | .250 |
| UC Santa Barbara | 4 | – | 12 | .250 | 6 | – | 22 | .214 |
† 2017 Big West tournament winner

The 2016–17 UC Riverside Highlanders men's basketball team represented the University of California, Riverside during the 2016–17 NCAA Division I men's basketball season. The Highlanders were led by fourth year head coach Dennis Cutts and played their home games at the Student Recreation Center Arena as members of the Big West Conference. They finished the season 7–21, 5–11 in Big West play to finish in eighth place. They lost in the quarterfinals of the Big West tournament to UC Irvine.

== Previous season ==
The Highlanders the season 14–19, 5–11 in Big West play to finish in a tie for sixth place. They lost in the first round of the Big West tournament to Long Beach State.

== Departures ==
| Name | Number | Pos. | Height | Weight | Year | Hometown | Notes |
|---|---|---|---|---|---|---|---|
| Jaylen Bland | 1 | G | 6'3" | 205 | Senior | Saginaw, MI | Graduated |
| Taylor Johns | 5 | F | 6'7" | 220 | Senior | San Francisco, CA | Graduated |
| Steven Jones | 10 | G | 6'0" | 175 | Senior | Northridge, CA | Graduated |
| Robert Boezeman | 12 | F | 6'7" | 220 | Sophomore | Dordrecht, Netherlands | Retired from basketball due to an elbow injury |
| Brady Anderson | 15 | F | 6'9" | 200 | Sophomore | Sacramento, CA | Walk-on; left the team for personal reasons |
| Primivito Gomez | 31 | F | 6'5" | 210 | Junior | El Monte, CA | Walk-on; graduate transferred to Cal Poly Pomona |

=== Incoming transfers ===
| Name | Number | Pos. | Height | Weight | Year | Hometown | Notes |
|---|---|---|---|---|---|---|---|
| Idy Diallo | 4 | F | 6'11" | 253 | RS Sophomore | Los Angeles, CA | Transferred from Boston College. Under NCAA transfer rules, Diallo will have to sit out for the 2016–17 season. Will have three years of remaining eligibility. |

== 2016 incoming recruits ==
College recruiting information
| Name | Hometown | School | Height | Weight | Commit date |
|---|---|---|---|---|---|
| Dikymbe Martin #69 PG | Riverside, CA | John W. North High School | 5 ft 11 in (1.80 m) | 160 lb (73 kg) | |
| Dikymbe Martin #69 PG | Recruit ratings: Scout: Rivals: (65) | | | | |
Overall recruit ranking:
Note: In many cases, Scout, Rivals, 247Sports, On3, and ESPN may conflict in their listings of height and weight.; In these cases, the average was taken. ESPN grades are on a 100-point scale.; Sources: "2016 Team Ranking". Rivals.

== Roster ==
2016–17 UC Riverside Highlanders men's basketball team
Players
Coaches

| Pos. | # | Name | Height | Weight | Year | Previous school | Hometown |
|---|---|---|---|---|---|---|---|
| G | 0 | Gentrey Thomas | 6 ft 4 in (1.93 m) | 195 lb (88 kg) | Sr | Orangeville HS | East Preston, NS |
| G | 1 | DJ Sylvester | 6 ft 3 in (1.91 m) | 175 lb (79 kg) | So | Morse HS | Victorville, CA |
| G | 3 | Chance Murray | 6 ft 3 in (1.91 m) | 195 lb (88 kg) | RS Jr | Price HS; Arizona State | Los Angeles, CA |
| G | 4 | Marcus Berkley | 6 ft 4 in (1.93 m) | 170 lb (77 kg) | Fr | Middlebrooks Academy | Garden Grove, CA |
| G | 11 | Malik Thames | 6 ft 2 in (1.88 m) | 165 lb (75 kg) | Sr | Pleasant Grove; Central Arizona | Sacramento, CA |
| C | 12 | Idy Diallo (I) (redshirt) | 6 ft 10 in (2.08 m) | 250 lb (113 kg) | RS So | Cathedral HS; Boston College | Los Angeles, CA |
| F | 13 | Eric Rhahwire | 6 ft 5 in (1.96 m) | 210 lb (95 kg) | So | Saddleback Valley Christian | Toronto, ON |
| F | 14 | Brandon Rosser | 6 ft 7 in (2.01 m) | 220 lb (100 kg) | RS Jr | Temecula Valley HS; Central Arizona College | Temecula, CA |
| G | 15 | Dcymbe Martin | 6 ft 1 in (1.85 m) | 165 lb (75 kg) | Fr | JW North HS | Riverside, CA |
| F | 20 | Secean Johnson | 6 ft 5 in (1.96 m) | 215 lb (98 kg) | Sr | Penn Wood HS | Philadelphia, PA |
| F | 21 | Alex Larrson | 6 ft 10 in (2.08 m) | 250 lb (113 kg) | Jr | Södertälje Knights Club Team | Södertälje, Sweden |
| G | 24 | Koh Flippin (W) | 6 ft 2 in (1.88 m) | 165 lb (75 kg) | So | North Torrance HS | Torrance, CA |
| C | 32 | Menno Dijkstra | 7 ft 0 in (2.13 m) | 225 lb (102 kg) | So | Canarias Basketball Academy | Standdaarbuiten, Netherlands |
| F | 40 | James Jackson | 6 ft 8 in (2.03 m) | 240 lb (109 kg) | Jr | Monte Vista HS; NW Kansas Tech College/Cuyamaca College | Spring Valley, CA |

Head coach

- Dennis Cutts (Albany)

Assistant coach(es)

- Justin Bell (UC Riverside)
- Keith Wilkinson (USC)
- Will Kimble (UTEP)

Legend

- (C) Team captain
- (S) Suspended
- (I) Ineligible
- (W) Walk-on
- Injured
- Current redshirt

Roster

== Schedule and results ==
| Date time, TV | Rank^{#} | Opponent^{#} | Result | Record | Site (attendance) city, state |
Non-conference regular season
| 11/11/2016*; 7:00 pm | | at Portland | L 55–71 | 0–1 | Chiles Center (2,601); Portland, OR |
| 11/16/2016*; 7:00 pm | | at UNLV | L 62–74 | 0–2 | Thomas & Mack Center (8,711); Paradise, NV |
| 11/19/2016*; 4:00 pm | | Fresno Pacific | W 98–50 | 1–2 | SRC Arena (2,115); Riverside, CA |
| 11/25/2016*; 6:00 pm, P12N | | at Utah | L 67–85 | 1–3 | Jon M. Huntsman Center (11,324); Salt Lake City, UT |
| 11/30/2016*; 8:00 pm, P12N | | at No. 11 UCLA | L 56–98 | 1–4 | Pauley Pavilion (6,328); Los Angeles, CA |
| 12/13/2016*; 7:00 pm | | at Santa Clara | L 53–77 | 1–5 | Leavey Center (1,066); Santa Clara, CA |
| 12/17/2016*; 5:00 pm | | Montana | L 63–71 | 1–6 | SRC Arena (299); Riverside, CA |
| 12/20/2016*; 5:00 pm | | at Northern Colorado | L 61–77 | 1–7 | Bank of Colorado Arena (1,232); Greeley, CO |
| 12/22/2016*; 6:00 pm | | at Denver | L 55–73 | 1–8 | Magness Arena (1,149); Denver, CO |
| 12/28/2016*; 7:00 pm | | Utah Valley | L 64–73 | 1–9 | SRC Arena (495); Riverside, CA |
| 12/31/2016*; 2:00 pm | | Grand Canyon | W 76–56 | 2–9 | SRC Arena (470); Riverside, CA |
Big West Conference regular season
| 01/04/2017; 7:00 pm | | at Cal State Northridge | L 76–82 | 2–10 (0–1) | Matadome (497); Northridge, CA |
| 01/07/2017; 4:00 pm, ESPN3 | | at Long Beach State | L 64–70 | 2–11 (0–2) | Walter Pyramid (2,906); Long Beach, CA |
| 01/12/2017; 8:00 pm, ESPN3 | | UC Davis | W 61–55 | 3–11 (1–2) | SRC Arena (897); Riverside, CA |
| 01/18/2017; 7:00 pm, ESPN3 | | at Cal State Fullerton | W 71–63 | 4–11 (2–2) | Titan Gym (703); Fullerton, CA |
| 01/21/2017; 4:00 pm, ESPN3 | | UC Santa Barbara | W 65–55 | 5–11 (3–2) | SRC Arena (674); Riverside, CA |
| 01/25/2017; 9:00 pm | | at Hawaii | W 70–64 | 6–11 (4–2) | Stan Sheriff Center (5,465); Honolulu, HI |
| 01/28/2017; 5:00 pm | | Cal State Northridge | L 59–63 | 6–12 (4–3) | SRC Arena (677); Riverside, CA |
| 02/02/2017; 8:00 pm, ESPN3 | | Hawaii | L 63–72 | 6–13 (4–4) | SRC Arena (1,252); Riverside, CA |
| 02/04/2017; 7:00 pm | | at Cal Poly | W 67–56 | 7–13 (5–4) | Mott Athletic Center (2,150); San Luis Obispo, CA |
| 02/09/2017; 7:00 pm, ESPN3 | | Long Beach State | L 71–78 | 7–14 (5–5) | SRC Arena (695); Riverside, CA |
| 02/11/2017; 5:00 pm | | at UC Davis | L 63–77 | 7–15 (5–6) | The Pavilion (2,607); Davis, CA |
| 02/16/2017; 8:00 pm | | Cal State Fullerton | L 55–56 | 7–16 (5–7) | SRC Arena (738); Riverside, CA |
| 02/18/2017; 9:00 pm, ESPNU | | at UC Irvine | L 60–79 | 7–17 (5–8) | Bren Events Center (1,860); Irvine, CA |
| 02/23/2017; 7:00 pm | | at UC Santa Barbara | L 61–68 | 7–18 (5–9) | The Thunderdome (1,618); Santa Barbara, CA |
| 02/25/2017; 5:00 pm, Prime Ticket | | Cal Poly | L 77–84 ^{OT} | 7–19 (5–10) | SRC Arena (555); Riverside, CA |
| 03/01/2017; 7:00 pm, ESPN3 | | UC Irvine | L 56–68 | 7–20 (5–11) | SRC Arena (781); Riverside, CA |
Big West tournament
| 03/09/2017; 6:00 pm, Prime Ticket | (8) | vs. (1) UC Irvine; Quarterfinals | L 67–76 | 7–21 | Honda Center (3,486); Anaheim, CA |
*Non-conference game. ^{#}Rankings from AP Poll. (#) Tournament seedings in parentheses. All times are in Pacific Time (#) Tournament seedings in parentheses..
