= Arkim Robertson =

Grenadian basketball player

Arkim Martin Robertson
No. 9 – Union Neuchâtel
- Position: Center
- League: Swiss Basketball League

Personal information
- Born: 2 July 1994 (age 32) Saint John Parish, Grenada
- Listed height: 2.06 m (6 ft 9 in)
- Listed weight: 240 lb (109 kg)

Career information
- College: Western Oklahoma State (2014–2016); Cal State Fullerton (2016–2018)
- Playing career: 2018–present

Career history
- 2018: Club del Progreso
- 2019: Pato Basquete
- 2019: AB Temuco
- 2019–2021: KK Adria Oil Škrljevo
- 2021–2022: Lugano Tigers
- 2022–present: Union Neuchâtel

Arkim Martin Robertson (born 2 July 1994) is a Grenadian professional basketball player.

== College career ==
Robertson's talent for basketball was discovered by a college coach who went to the Caribbean to scout an Antiguan player who suited up against Robertson's Grenadan Saint John High School.

== Professional career ==
From 2019 to 2021, he played for KK Adria Oil Škrljevo of the international Alpe Adria Cup and the national Croatian League.
